= Vincent Paterson =

American director and choreographer (born 1950)

- Born: May 4, 1950 (age 76); Upland, Pennsylvania, U.S.
- Occupations: Director, choreographer, dancer
- Years active: 1979–present
- Spouse: Rene Lamontagne (m. 2014)

Vincent Paterson (born May 4, 1950) is an American director and choreographer who has had an expansive career in many parts of the entertainment industry including film, Broadway, concert tours, opera, music videos, television and commercials. He has achieved success worldwide as a director and choreographer.

== Career ==
=== Music ===
Paterson collaborated with Michael Jackson, George Harrison and Madonna on various projects, including directing and choreographing Madonna's Blond Ambition Tour, the centerpiece for the documentary Madonna: Truth or Dare (also known as In Bed with Madonna outside of North America). He created Madonna's "Marie Antoinette/Vogue" performance for the MTV Awards and her appearance on the Academy Awards. He also choreographed Madonna in the film Evita (1996). For Michael Jackson, he is one of the two fighter dancers in "Beat It" videoclip, and was assistant choreographer and a zombie dancer in "Thriller". He co-directed and co-choreographed Jackson's Bad World Tour as well as co-choreographing Jackson music videos "Smooth Criminal", "The Way You Make Me Feel", "Dirty Diana", "Speed Demon", "Black or White" and live performances for the Super Bowl XXVII Halftime show, the Grammys, and the MTV 10th Anniversary. He also co-directed and co-choreographed the music video for Jackson's hit "Blood on the Dance Floor".

=== Films ===
Paterson directed (with one hundred cameras) and choreographed the musical sequences in Lars Von Trier's film Dancer in the Dark, which was awarded the Palme d'Or at the Cannes Film Festival. He has choreographed several films, including The Birdcage and Closer for director Mike Nichols and Evita for Alan Parker. Threnody, his 2002 short dance-film reflection on September 11, won the Gold Jury Award at the Houston Cinema Arts Festival. He also choreographed the videos "Hot for Teacher" for Van Halen and "California Girls" for David Lee Roth as well as videos for George Harrison, Donna Summer, Sheena Easton, Paul McCartney and Julie Brown. His initiation into the opera world was his direction of the TV program Anna Netrebko: The Woman, The Voice. The DVD is the top selling classical DVD in European history. He directed the television film In Search of Dr. Seuss, which received seven Emmy Award nominations. He choreographed ABC's South Pacific starring Glenn Close and has served as choreographer for several Academy and Grammy Award programs. As a cinematic tribute to his direction and choreography in an array of electronic media, The Lincoln Center Film Society presented an evening entitled "Vincent Paterson, Master of the Media." A similar evening was previously held at Paris' Cinematheque Francais.

Paterson has choreographed sections of films such as Ruby, Hook, The Mighty Quinn, and Mannequin.

=== Commercials ===
Paterson has choreographed over two hundred and fifty commercials including commercial campaigns for Pepsi, GE, Rubbermaid and Nike, directed commercial campaigns for Payless ShoeSource and El Pollo Loco, for the television series Dharma & Greg and a documentary for Project Angel Food.

As a dancer in his early career, he danced for Shirley MacLaine and was Barbara Mandrell's partner on her TV series for two years. He appeared in many TV specials with Lynda Carter, Cheryl Ladd, the Osmonds, among others. He partnered both Olivia Newton-John and Diana Ross in music videos.

Paterson is featured in the Smithsonian publication, "Masters of Movement: Portraits of America's Greatest Choreographers." He has also served as a judge on Bravo's dance reality series Step It Up and Dance along with fellow choreographer Nancy O'Meara and actress and dancer Elizabeth Berkley. The highly acclaimed documentary about Paterson's life, "The Man Behind the Throne," has been shown nationally and internationally and has garnered numerous awards for Swedish director Kersti Grunditz. He was made a Fellow at Dickinson College, Carlisle, Pennsylvania.

=== Broadway ===
Paterson's direction of the play Gangsta Love, set in a boxing club, earned him a Los Angeles Drama-Logue award for outstanding director. He also directed Prague's National BlackLight Theater in Gulliver's Travels.

Paterson has a Tony nomination for his work as choreographer on Kiss of the Spiderwoman, starring Chita Rivera on Broadway.

He choreographed London's West End production of Lenny for director Sir Peter Hall and Los Angeles Opera's Grand Duchess for director Garry Marshall.

Paterson directed the opera Manon for both the Los Angeles Opera and the Berlin Staatsoper which was conducted in Los Angeles by Plácido Domingo and starred soprano Anna Netrebko and Rolando Villazon.

In 2009, he directed and wrote Cirque du Soleil's Viva Elvis presented at Las Vegas' CityCenter.

In 2012, Paterson directed Loving the Silent Tears, a Broadway-style musical, based on Supreme Master Ching Hai’s poetry collection, Silent Tears.

2004 he directed and choreographed in Berlin the Kander & Ebb musical Cabaret. Originally at Bar jeder Vernunft and now at TIPI am Kanzleramt. It is the longest running show in Berlin's history. In 2016, he directed and choreographed Lloyd Webber's musical, Evita, for the Ronacher Theater in Vienna. The successful run was extended for 5 months.
