= The Butler's in Love =

2008 film by David Arquette

- Directed by: David Arquette
- Written by: Curtis Reynolds
- Produced by: David Arquette; Courteney Cox
- Starring: Elizabeth Berkley; Thomas Jane; Richmond Arquette
- Cinematography: Peter Anderson
- Edited by: Tara Timpone
- Production companies: Le Tourment Vert; Bischoff/Hervey Entertainment; Coquette Productions
- Distributed by: Coquette Productions
- Release date: June 23, 2008
- Running time: 12 minutes
- Country: United States
- Language: English

The Butler's in Love is a short film directed by David Arquette and starring Elizabeth Berkley and Thomas Jane. The film is based on a painting by Mark Stock which hangs in Bix, the San Francisco restaurant where Arquette and his wife Courteney Cox held their rehearsal dinner the night before their wedding.

The work shows a butler holding up a glass which is smudged with lipstick and a bottle of absinthe on a side table. "We didn't have any absinthe at our wedding," said Arquette with a laugh. "But I never forgot about the painting. I think of the romance behind it."

The film was shot in 3D on location in San Francisco and premiered June 23, 2008. at Mann's Chinese Theatre in Los Angeles, California. The rest of the Arquette siblings attended the screening, as well as his wife Cox and stars Elizabeth Berkley and Thomas Jane.

The Butler's in Love is the first of many short films from the full-service film production company Tourmented Films. French absinthe brand Le Tourment Vert, in cooperation with Converge Entertainment, announced on June 23, 2008, the launch of their newest venture, Tourmented Films. Established to create edgy short films that carry the look and feel of the absinthe genre, it was officially launched with The Butler's in Love..

== Plot ==
The plot is based on the Mark Stock painting The Butler's in Love. It concerns the romance between a butler and the wife of the host of a fancy dress party in 1912.

== Cast ==
- Thomas Jane as The Butler
- Elizabeth Berkley as The Wife
- Richmond Arquette as The Husband
- Mark Stock as The Magician
- Jenny Scheinman as The Singer
- Celia de Blas as Dinner Party Guest
- Kyle Scudiere as Patron
- Bert van Aalsburg as Dinner Party Guest

== 3D capture ==
This was the first production use of KernerFX's Kernercam stereoscopic 3D camera rig. When the project was brought to Kerner Studios, Kerner requested that a number of features previously considered 'tricky' for 3D capture be included in the film including fire, crystal glass, and motion.

The Butler's in Love was lensed by Peter Anderson, a 3D cinematographer who had originally designed the Kerner 3D rig for his filming of Godzilla 3-D.
