= Los Luchadores =

Canadian-American television series

- Created by: Shawn Williamson
- Developed by: Brad Markowitz
- Starring: Maximo Morrone; Levi James; Sarah Carter; Arthur Burghardt
- Voices of: Gary Lam
- Theme music composer: Paul Gordon; Ron Kenan; Shuki Levy; Kussa Mahchi
- Countries of origin: Canada; United States
- Original languages: English; French; Spanish
- No. of episodes: 16

Production
- Executive producers: Brad Markowitz; Lance H. Robbins; James Shavick; Abbie Charette
- Running time: 22 mins
- Production companies: Fox Family Worldwide; Saban Entertainment; Shavick Entertainment; Rainmaker Digital Pictures (Special Effects)

Original release
- Network: YTV (Canada); Fox Kids (United States)
- Release: February 1 – July 1, 2001

Los Luchadores is a live-action children's television series that aired on Fox Kids in 2001 produced by Saban Entertainment and Shavick Entertainment. Ownership of the series passed to Disney in that year when Disney acquired Fox Kids Worldwide, which also includes Saban Entertainment.

== Plot ==
The series is about a group of lucha libre-style masked wrestlers led by Lobo Fuerte who, along with Turbine, Maria Valentine, and Laurent, operate as vigilantes fighting to protect Union City from a slew of different enemies like the Whelp and the bumbling antics of Mayor Potts. The series title is translated as "The Wrestlers" or "The Fighters" from Spanish.

== Characters ==
=== Main ===
- Lobo Fuerte (portrayed by Maximo Morrone) is the greatest masked wrestler in Union City who leads the Los Luchadores into fighting against evil in Union City. His headquarters is in the Wolf's Lair on top of the Lobo Tower.
- Turbine (portrayed by Levi James) is one of Lobo Fuerte's sidekicks. He rides a motorcycle.
- Maria Valentine (portrayed by Sarah Carter) is one of Lobo Fuerte's sidekicks.
- Laurent (portrayed by Arthur Burghardt) is the Jamaican trainer and tech support of the Los Luchadores.

=== Villains ===
- The Whelp (portrayed by Cuervo, performed by Paul Jarrett and Bill Terezakis, voiced by Gary Lam, understudied by Lee Tockar in "The Whelp Strikes Back") is the main antagonist of the series. Cesar is the pet Chihuahua of Dr. Jacob Mueller. He becomes an evil genius through a freak accident during Los Luchadores' fight with Mueller's former assistant Douglas Slade that resulted in some of Slade's evil being transferred into him. The Whelp has metal covering his left ear and eye and wears a special translator collar so that his minions can understand him. In addition, the Whelp rides a robotic suit when fighting Lobo Fuerte.
  - Whelpettes (portrayed by Anita Brown and Sonya Salomaa) are two females who are servants of the Whelp.
  - Bone Warriors are the skull-masked minions of The Whelp.

=== Other characters ===
- Mayor Potts (portrayed by Dave Hurtubise) is the bumbling mayor of Union City.
- Gertrude (portrayed by Nancy Robertson) is Mayor Potts' aide.

== Episodes ==
1. Ay, Chihuahua: Series pilot. Douglas Slade (played by Alex Zahara), the crippled former assistant of a scientist named Jacob Mueller (played by Russell Roberts), escapes from prison. With the aid of his henchman Hard Case, he abducts Mueller and some security guards in his building. Slade forces Mueller to turn him into a hybrid monstrosity that involves the injection of cheetah and lizard DNA as a way to make him whole again. After becoming Freakshow, Slade transforms the captive security guards into animal hybrids like himself and plans to induct Lobo Fuerte into his entourage so that they can have a warrior's spirit among them.
2. Bad to the Bone: Following Los Luchadores' fight with Freakshow, which transferred some of his evil into him, the Whelp makes himself known to Lobo and Turbine when he plans to resurrect the long dead pirate Louie Andre LaFeet, who was said to have allied with dark forces.
3. Confrontation in the Constellation: Lobo is captured by aliens (played by Andrew Jackson, Scott McNeil, Rick Faraci, and Alex Doduk) to fight in an intergalactic wrestling tournament.
4. The Pyramid of Doom: The trio must save campers from becoming meals for aliens. They find an ally in a deaf girl that was immune to their sonic device.
5. Anxiety Attacks: When a group of dwarves pull pranks on the city, trying to cause fear, Turbine is frozen in place, leaving Lobo to fight the dwarves alone to stop them from causing a chaos storm. Things are further complicated when Sophia, a foreign princess (played by Natassia Malthe; credited as Lina Teal) arrives in the city for a business deal with the mayor and avoiding the company of her overprotective bodyguard (played by Christopher Gaze). Thankfully, Maria Valentine is able to look out for her.
6. The Whelp Strikes Back: As Maria goes on a date with Dirk Layden (played by G. Patrick Currie), she learns that he is working for the Whelp who sends a robotic double to infiltrate Lobo Tower and prepare it for the Whelp's plan to unleash his shrinking cannon.
7. Along Came A Spider: Doris Crabowski (played by Jeanette Sousa), assistant to Dr. Shax (played by Linden Banks), is a devoted fan of Lobo Fuerte who has often had credit for her work taken by her superiors. Due to the negligence of her boss, she ends up unknowingly ingesting experimental spider venom, which turns her into a half-spider mutant. Taking the name of Spiderella, Doris desires to claim Lobo as a mate in order to start a new reign of arachnids in Union City.
8. Lobo Limbo: It's Maria's birthday and everyone is ready to celebrate meanwhile, Lobo and Turbine must stop a firing tiki god and save the descendants of the tiki god including Maria.
9. The Mask of Diablo Azul: A thief (played by John DeSantis) steals a cursed mask that was worn by the ancient necromancer Diablo Azul which compels him to raise the dead. After Lobo and Turbine manage to defeat him, Turbine becomes possessed by the spirit instead. It becomes a race against time for Lobo to free his friend and stop the dead rising with the aid of the mask's former guardian (played by Marcus Hondro).
10. The Brain Drain: Lobo Fuerte's old friend Dr. Maxine Harris (played by Rebecca Reichert) has invented the Ion Particle Stabilizer, which would become a destabilizer if it overheats. The invention would help in stabilizing the ozone. Unfortunately, the Ion Particle Stabilizer attracts the attention of the Whelp who uses an invention to switch minds with Lobo Fuerte so that he can use his body to get past the security system guarding the stabilizer.
11. It's a Mud, Mud, Mud, Mud World: A scientist (played by Robin Mossley) accidentally creates a mutant mud monster that intends to flood the city.
12. Here Comes the Sludge: Mud Man returns and attacks Alfred Shrub (played by Zook Matthews), an environmental activist. However, Lobo and Turbine find out that (this time) Mud Man is on the side of good when Shrub reveals himself to be an eco-terrorist who intends to turn Union City into a forest and ingests a tree growth hormone to grant himself plant manipulation powers as well as turning himself into a half-plant mutant.
13. A Good Whelp is Hard to Find:
14. Puppy Love: Union City is opening its new water treatment plant. The Whelp has developed a chemical that causes anyone exposed to it into mutant Bone Warriors, having tested it on cheating tag-team wrestlers Motley and Gnarly, as well as the wrestler Hog (played by Eric Alex Gelinas). With the Whelp's plan to infect the water treatment plant with it, Lobo Fuerte must thwart him before Mayor Potts activates the plant.
15. World Without Lobo:
16. The Champ:
