= The Shipment (film) =

2001 film by Alex Wright

- Directed by: Alex Wright
- Written by: Richard Steen
- Produced by: David Bixler; Greg Malcolm; Vicki Sotheran; Christopher Webster
- Starring: Matthew Modine; Elizabeth Berkley; Nicholas Turturro
- Cinematography: Russ Lyster
- Edited by: Louis F. Cioffi
- Music by: Richard Tuttobene
- Production companies: Promark Entertainment Group; Videal GmbH
- Distributed by: DEJ Productions (via its Two Left Shoes Films label)
- Release date: 2001
- Running time: 92 minutes
- Country: Canada
- Language: English
- Budget: $5,500,000 (estimated)

The Shipment is a 2001 film about a mob enforcer who is hired to recover a shipment of Viagra gone awry. Directed by Alex Wright, it stars Matthew Modine, Elizabeth Berkley, Nicholas Turturro, and Robert Loggia.

== Cast ==
=== Main cast ===
- Matthew Modine as Mitch Garrett
- Elizabeth Berkley as Candy Colucci
- Nicholas Turturro as Eddie Colucci
- Robert Loggia as Frank Colucci
- Joseph Cortese as Vincent Florio
- Paul Rodriguez as Jose Garcia
- Garry Chalk as Dale Dixer
- Philip Granger as Jack

=== Supporting cast ===
- Rob deLeeuw as Danny (Credited as Robert deLeeuw)
- G. Michael Gray as Lester Tritt
- Steve Bacic as Jimmy
- Rob Daly as Luis
- Michael Sicoly as Mike
- Craig Veroni as Pancho
- Jay Brazeau as Marty
- Michael Roberds as Bubba
- Wren Roberts as Cowboy Pete (Credited as Wren Robertz)
- Carmen Aguirre as Mexican Hooker #1
- Alexandra Castillo as Mexican Hooker #2 (Credited as Alex Castillo)
- Colin Naples as Small Mexican Cop
- Karen Robertson as Bikini Girl #1
- Laura Hargreaves as Bikini Girl #2
