= John DeSantis =

Canadian actor (born 1973)

- Born: November 13, 1973 (age 52); Nanaimo, British Columbia, Canada
- Occupation: Actor
- Years active: 1998–present

John DeSantis, sometimes credited as John De Santis or John Desantis, (born November 13, 1973) is a Canadian character actor, best known as Lurch on the Fox Family show The New Addams Family. His other work includes a principal role in Disney's Touchstone Pictures film The 13th Warrior, in which he played a Viking warrior named Ragnar the Dour. He has also appeared in television series Police Academy and Supernatural.

== Filmography ==
=== Film ===
Year	Title	Role	Notes
1999	The 13th Warrior	Ragnar - Dour	
2001	Thirteen Ghosts	Horace "Breaker" Mahoney, The Juggernaut	
2002	Ballistic: Ecks vs. Sever	Bus Guard #2	
2003	Master and Commander: The Far Side of the World	Padeen, Loblolly Boy	
2005	The Long Weekend	Cellmate	
2005	Barbie and the Magic of Pegasus 3-D	Ollie the Giant	Direct-to-video (voice role)
2006	Little Man	Bruno	
2007	Aliens vs. Predator: Requiem	—N/a	Stunts
2008	The Auburn Hills Breakdown	Junior	Short film
2009	Ratko: The Dictator's Son	Skender	
2009	The Hole	Monster Dad	
2009	Stan Helsing	Frankenstein's Monster	
2010	30 Days of Night: Dark Days	Gunther	Direct-to-video
2014	Mutant World	Giant Mutant	
2014	Seventh Son	Tusk	
2016	Viking	Berserk	
2023	Peter Pan & Wendy	Bill Jukes	

=== Television ===
Year	Title	Role	Notes
1998	Police Academy: The Series	Thug	Episode: "Karate Cops"
1998–1999	The New Addams Family	Lurch	Main cast
2000	Harsh Realm	Big Tracker	Episode: "Reunion"
2001	Stargate SG-1	Jaffa #1	Episode: "Double Jeopardy"
2001	Voyage of the Unicorn	Cratch	TV movie
2001	Los Luchadores	Hugo Furst	Episode: "The Mask of Diablo Azul"
2001	Dead Last	Evil Ghost	Episode: "Pilot"
2001	Dark Angel	Miller, the Mangler	Episode: "Proof of Purchase"
2001	Andromeda	Stalin Kuleshov	Episode: "Fear and Loathing in the Milky Way"
2001	Andromeda	Hsigo	Episode: "Last Call at the Broken Hammer"
2002	Snow Queen	Satan	TV movie
2003	Smallville	The Traveller	Episode: "Slumber"
2004	Behind the Camera: The Unauthorized Story of Charlie's Angels	Bigfoot (Note: DeSantis appears in a recreation of a sequence from an unidentified episode of The Six Million Dollar Man; two actors played the character in the series, but it's not indicated if DeSantis is depicting Andre the Giant or Ted Cassidy.)	TV movie
2004	Dead Like Me	Tiny	Episode: "Ghost Story"
2005	Earthsea	Kargide Soldier #1	Miniseries
2005	Andromeda	Behemoth	Episode: "One More Day's Light"
2005	Bloodsuckers	Ble-Ka	TV movie
2005	Masters of Horror	Moonface	Episode: "Incident On and Off a Mountain Road"
2006	Blade: The Series	Thorne	Recurring
2007	Painkiller Jane	Henry Perkins	Episode: "Breakdown"
2007	Flash Gordon	Night Hunter	Episode: "Alliances"
2007	Flash Gordon	Strake	Episode: "Random Access"
2007	The Dresden Files	Demon	Episode: "Storm Front"
2008	The Dresden Files	Demon Akiahacaric	Episode: "Pilot: Storm Front"
2008	Supernatural	Freeman Daggett	Episode: "Ghostfacers"
2008	Sanctuary	—N/a	Stunt player; Episode: "Warriors"
2009	Knights of Bloodsteel	Goblin Strongarm	Miniseries
2009	The Gambler, the Girl and the Gunslinger	Mule	TV movie
2009	Eureka	Big Ed	Episode: "It's Not Easy Being Green"
2009	The Troop	Mr. Toofgib	1 episode
2010	Psych	Seven Foot Tall Man	Episode: "Dual Spires"
2011	Smallville	Male Phantom Zone Inhabitant	Episode: "Dominion"
2011	Smallville	Solomon Grundy	Episode: "Prophecy"
2012	Once Upon A Time	Dove	Episode: "Skin Deep"
2012	Big Time Movie	Maxwell	TV movie
2012	Level Up	Blundergore the Giant	Episode: "You Don't Know Jack"
2013	Supernatural	The Golem	Episode: "Everybody Hates Hitler"
2013–2014	Hell on Wheels	Irish Worker	3 episodes
2014	Supernatural	Scarecrow	Uncredited; Episode: "Fan Fiction"
2014–2015	Falling Skies	Shaq	Recurring (season 4–5)
2015	Olympus	Cyclops	Episode: "The Temple of Gaia"
2015	Olympus	Chronos	Recurring
2016	The 100	Servant / Gideon	2 episodes
2016	The X-Files	Band-Aid Nose Man	Episode: "Home Again"
2016	Supergirl	Draaga	Episode: "Survivors"
2016–2017	Mech-X4	Davage	Recurring
2016–2017	Van Helsing	Gustov	Recurring (season 1)
2017	Van Helsing	Skinner #1	Episode: "A Home"
2017	Supernatural	Moloch	Episode: "The Memory Remains"
2017	Escape from Mr. Lemoncello's Library	Frankenstein's Monster	TV movie
2017–2019	A Series of Unfortunate Events	Bald Man	Recurring
2018	Arrow	Grim Reaper	2 episodes
2019	Legends of Tomorrow	Ogre	2 episodes

=== Video games ===
Year	Title	Role
2016	Dead Rising 4	Evos
