= Michael Roberds =

Canadian actor (1964–2016)

- Born: January 18, 1964; Vancouver, British Columbia, Canada
- Died: May 15, 2016 (aged 52); Langley, British Columbia, Canada
- Occupation: Actor
- Years active: 1969–2016

Michael Roberds (January 18, 1964 – May 15, 2016) was a Canadian actor who starred in YTV's The New Addams Family as Uncle Fester.

== Early life ==
Roberds began reading by the age of three. He performed the role of Big Bird in the school play "Christmas on Sesame Street" at age five. He entertained his neighbours by reading them jokes at parties and quickly grew to enjoy the attention. Throughout his school career, he was active in theater productions and began acting professionally in 1987 when he did his first television commercial for GM.

== Career ==
He wrote and performed sketches for David Chalk's Computer Show, in addition to roles on the mystery drama series Strange Luck and in Ernest Goes to School starring Jim Varney. He starred on Fox Family's The New Addams Family as Uncle Fester. His television guest appearances include Da Vinci's City Hall, Supernatural, and Police Academy. Roberds was also a member of the comedy troupe "Almost Midnight".

== Personal life ==
Roberds died after a brief illness on May 15, 2016.

== Filmography ==
=== Film ===
Year	Title	Role	Notes
1991	Ultimate Desires	Policeman	
1994	Ernest Goes to School	Server	
1996	Happy Gilmore	Shirtless 'H' Fan	Uncredited
1997	Horsey	Manfred Fireburn	
2000	How to Kill Your Neighbor's Dog	Fry Cook	
2001	Saving Silverman	Doctor	
2001	L.A.P.D.: To Protect and to Serve	Bud Meyerling	
2001	The Shipment	Bubba	
2002	The Stick Up	Deputy Hatcher	
2002	Try Seventeen	Clerk	
2003	Elf	Disgruntled Cobbler Elf	
2004	Connie and Carla	Frank	
2005	Bob the Butler	Barber	
2006	Civic Duty	Post Office Clerk	
2006	Hell Hath No Fury	Mr. Edwards	
2008	Blonde and Blonder	Film Director	
2008	Sharp as Marbles	Mr. Wilson	
2008	Christmas Town	N. P. Guard	
2009	Alien Trespass	Bubba	
2010	Hot Tub Time Machine	Manager	
2011	Bong of the Dead	Baby Eating Zombie	
2013	Mop King	Pigeon Man	

=== Television ===
Year	Title	Role	Notes
1991	The Commish	Bartender	Episode: "Two Confessions"
1993	Northwood	Delivery Driver	Episode: "Who's Sorry Now"
1994	Roommates	Millard	Television film
1994	Madison	Billy Bob	Episode: "True Colours"
1995	University Hospital	Luke	Episode: "Life and Death"
1995	Beauty's Revenge	Bartender Hal	Television film
1995	The Surrogate	Newspaper Delivery Man	Television film
1995	Strange Luck	Gordie	Episode: "The Box"
1996	Doctor Who	Hospital Security Guard	Television film
1996	Two	George Stedman	Episode: "Reunion"
1997	The Adventures of Shirley Holmes	Butch	Episode: "The Case of the Singer's Secret"
1997	Millennium	Al	Episode: "Beware of the Dog"
1997	Super Dave's All Stars	Tell it like it is contestant	Episode #1.1
1997	Unwed Father	Restaurant Supervisor	Television film
1997–1998	Police Academy: The Series	Various roles	3 episodes
1998	Dead Man's Gun	Matthew Hammond	Episode: "The Resurrection of Joe Wheeler"
1998–1999	The New Addams Family	Various roles	65 episodes
2000	Nothing Too Good for a Cowboy	Ned Bartley	Episode: "No Bull"
2000	Honey, I Shrunk the Kids: The TV Show	Hugo	Episode: "Honey, I'm Spooked"
2000	The Inspectors 2: A Shred of Evidence	Irate Man	Television film
2000	Ratz	Yard Sale Man	Television film
2000	Special Delivery	Bus Driver	Television film
2000	Call of the Wild	Crewman	Episode: "Molly Brown"
2001	Bratty Babies	Wendell	Television film
2001	Off Season	Customer	Television film
2001, 2002	Cold Squad	Cage's Lawyer / Hank Ranger	2 episodes
2001, 2003	Da Vinci's Inquest	Levy / Robbie	2 episodes
2003	Impromptu: The Audition	Producer	Television film
2003	Jake 2.0	Tow Truck Driver	Episode: "The Good, the Bad, and the Geeky"
2004	Commander's Log	Dr. Patsey	Television film
2004	The Dead Zone	Fitch	Episode: "Total Awareness"
2004	Dead Like Me	Rusty	Episode: "The Ledger"
2005	The Collector	Ronnie	Episode: "The Comic"
2005	Tru Calling	Cabbie	Episode: "In the Dark"
2005–2006	Da Vinci's City Hall	Councillor Ben Solomon	6 episodes
2005–2006	Robson Arms	Brent the Shopping Cart Guy	5 episodes
2006	Psych	Manager	Episode: "Pilot"
2006	Alice, I Think	Ryan	Episode: "Smitten in Smithers"
2006	Intelligence	Pete Molloy	Episode: "Where Good Men Die Like Dogs"
2007	Painkiller Jane	Ralf Beetle	Episode: "Trial by Fire"
2007	Psychic Investigators	David Lowe	Episode: "Bad Company"
2008	Supernatural	Mark Hutchins	Episode: "Yellow Fever"
2008	The Most Wonderful Time of the Year	Chet Wojorski	Television film
2011	Time after Time	Will Howard	Television film
2011	The Killing	Store Owner	Episode: "What You Have Left"
2012	Once Upon a Time	Donkey Driver	Episode: "The Return"
2012	Mr. Young	Alien 1	Episode: "Mr. Sci-Fi"
2012	Finding Mrs. Claus	Dumb Santa	Television film
2013	One Foot in Hell	Mr. Sugarman	Television film
2013	Fatal Performance	Cab Driver	Television film
2015	All of My Heart	Deli Owner	Television film
2015	Some Assembly Required	King Mel	Episode: "Flurf"
2015	Adventures in Babysitting	Head Chef	Television film
