= Breaker High =

Teen comedy-drama series

- Genre: Comedy drama
- Created by: Cori Stern
- Directed by: John Bell; George Erschbamer; Arvi Liimatainen; Don McCutcheon; Ron Oliver; David Winning
- Starring: Kyle Alisharan; Terri Conn; Ryan Gosling; Wendi Kenya; Tyler Labine; Scott Vickaryous; Persia White; Rachel Wilson
- Composers: Shuki Levy; Kussa Mahchi; Jeremy Sweet; Michael Whittaker
- Countries of origin: Canada; United States
- Original language: English
- No. of seasons: 1
- No. of episodes: 44

Production
- Executive producers: Lance H. Robbins; Haim Saban; James Shavick
- Producer: Victoria Woods
- Cinematography: Larry Lynn
- Camera setup: Single-camera
- Running time: 22–24 minutes
- Production companies: Shavick Entertainment; Saban Entertainment

Original release
- Network: YTV (Canada); UPN (United States)
- Release: September 15, 1997 – March 30, 1998

Breaker High is a teen comedy-drama series that ran from September 15, 1997 to March 30, 1998, airing on YTV in Canada and on UPN's weekday "Kids" block in the United States. The series was created by Cori Stern, while David Winning directed the pilot and seven episodes of the series.

Ownership of the series passed to Disney in 2001 when Disney acquired Fox Kids Worldwide, which also includes Saban Entertainment.

== Synopsis ==
The series is set at a high school located on a cruise ship (equivalent to the real Semester at Sea program), allowing the episodes to be set in different exotic locations, although the series was, in fact, filmed entirely in Vancouver, British Columbia. Like most series of its kind, it featured events such as dating, finances, and friendship, although as a daytime series, it tended to steer away from the "tougher" situations (pregnancy, sexuality, etc.) outlined in other primetime teen dramas at the time.

== Cast and characters ==
- Rachel Wilson as Tamira Goldstein
- Ryan Gosling as Sean Stanley Hanlon
- Terri Conn as Ashley Dupree
- Tyler Labine as Jimmy Mortimor Farrell
- Scott Vickaryous as Max Ballard
- Persia White as Denise Williams
- Wendi Kenya as Cassidy Cartwright
- Kyle Alisharan as Alex Pineda
- Bernard Cuffling as Nigel Mumford, the cook
- Andrew Airlie as Captain Ballard, the captain of the ship, school principal and Max's father
- Richard Ian Cox as Tony Gifford, the student activities counselor
- Anne Openshaw as Ana Mitchell, the kids' teacher

== Episode list ==
1. "Sun Also Rises"
2. "Pranks for the Memories"
3. "Mayhem on the Orient Distress"
4. "Don't Get Curried Away"
5. "Kenya Dig It?"
6. "Tomb with a View"
7. "Radio Daze"
8. "Beware of Geeks Baring Their Gifts"
9. "Belly of the Beast"
10. "Rooming Violations"
11. "Chateau L'Feet J'mae"
12. "Out with the Old, In with the Shrew"
13. "Tamira is Another Day"
14. "For Pizza's Sake"
15. "Kissin' Cousins"
16. "The Caber Guy"
17. "When In Rome..."
18. "Silence of the Lamborghini"
19. "All Seeing Bull's Eye"
20. "Squall's Well that Ends Well"
21. "That Lip-Synching Feeling"
22. "Yoo Hoo, Mr. Palace Lifeguard"
23. "Two Seans Don't Make a Right"
24. "Tamira Has Two Faces"
25. "Swiss You Were Here"
26. "A Funny Thing Happened on the Way to the Post Office"
27. "Some You Win, Some You Luge"
28. "Stowing Pains"
29. "Moon Over Tamira"
30. "He Shoots, He Scores"
31. "Jimmy Behaving Badly"
32. "Regret Me Nots"
33. "New Kids on the Deck"
34. "Six Degrees of Humiliation" (Part 1)
35. "Don't Go Breakin' My Art" (Part 2)
36. "Worth Their Waste in Gold"
37. "The Deck's Files"
38. "Rasta La Vista"
39. "Max-He-Can Hat Dance"
40. "Kiss of the Shy-er Woman"
41. "Lord of the Butterflies"
42. "Chile Dog"
43. "Heartbreaker High"
44. "To Kill a Mocking Nerd"

== Syndication ==
The series formerly aired on MTV and MTV2, and currently on OutTV (Canadian TV channel) in Canada.
