= The New Addams Family =

- Promotional poster
- Genre: Gothic sitcom
- Written by: Peggy Nicoll, Rich Hosek, Arnold Rudnick
- Starring: Glenn Taranto; Ellie Harvie; Brody Smith; Nicole Fugere; Betty Phillips; Michael Roberds; John DeSantis; Steven Fox
- Composers: Barron Abramovitch; Jeremy Sweet; Michael Whittaker
- Countries of origin: United States; Canada
- Original language: English
- No. of seasons: 1
- No. of episodes: 65

Production
- Executive producers: Lance H. Robbins; James Shavick
- Producer: Victoria Woods
- Camera setup: Single-camera
- Running time: 22–24 minutes
- Production companies: Film Incentive B.C. Fox Family Worldwide; Shavick Entertainment; Saban Entertainment

Original release
- Network: YTV (Canada); Fox Family Channel (United States)
- Release: October 19, 1998 – August 28, 1999

Related
- The Addams Family

The New Addams Family is a Gothic sitcom that aired from October 1998 to August 1999 on YTV in Canada, Fox Family in the United States, and CITV in the United Kingdom on weekends. It was produced by Shavick Entertainment and Saban Entertainment as a revival of the 1960s series The Addams Family. The series was shot in Vancouver, British Columbia, Canada.

== Plot ==
The Addams Family consists of husband and wife, Gomez and Morticia Addams, their children, Wednesday and Pugsley, as well as Grandmama, Uncle Fester, and their butler, Lurch. The Addams' are a close-knit extended family with decidedly macabre interests and supernatural abilities. No explanation for their powers is explicitly given in the series. Some of the episodes in this series are remakes of the original TV series' episodes with some episodes being exclusive to this show.

Later episodes introduce Grandpapa Addams, Gomez's grandfather, who had similar traits to Gomez. Grandpapa Addams was played by John Astin, who had played Gomez in the original series.

== Cast ==
=== Main cast ===
- Glenn Taranto as Gomez Addams
- Ellie Harvie as Morticia Addams
- Brody Smith as Pugsley Addams
- Nicole Fugere as Wednesday Addams. Fugere was the only member of the Addams Family Reunion cast to return for the series.
- Betty Phillips as Eudora "Grandmama" Addams
- Michael Roberds as Uncle Fester
- John DeSantis as Lurch
- Steven Fox's Hand as Thing

=== Guest cast ===
- John Astin as Grandpapa Addams
- David Mylrea as Cousin Itt
  - Paul Dobson as voice of Cousin Itt
- Tabitha St. Germain as Melancholia
- Demetri Goritsas as Simon
- Meredith Bain Woodward as Granny Frump
- Lisa Calder as Ophelia Frump
- Shoshoni as Kitty Kat

== Production ==
=== Development ===
The series – shot in Vancouver – featured a new cast; Gomez Addams was played by Glenn Taranto, and Morticia by Ellie Harvie. The show reworked several storylines from the original series while incorporating modern elements, jokes, and references to episodes from the original series. John Astin, who played Gomez in the original series, appeared in a recurring role as Grandpapa Addams; Taranto – who was a fan of the original show – patterned his performance after Astin's original version of Gomez.

=== Writing ===
One of the notable differences between the original show and the new series was that Wednesday and Pugsley (Nicole Fugere and Brody Smith respectively – the former reprising her role from Addams Family Reunion) were given expanded roles that highlighted their violent and sadistic personalities, made popular by The Addams Family film. Another element carried over from the films was Fester being Gomez's brother, whereas in the original show he had been Morticia's uncle.

=== Theme music ===
The new theme music, performed by the cast, was a departure from the familiar tune that had served most previous and subsequent adaptations of the series. The familiar finger-snapping was present, albeit at a faster pace, accompanied by two different characters (first Lurch, then Gomez) saying the word "snap" twice in rapid succession to match the beat. It was written by Barron Abramovitch, Jeremy Sweet, and Michael Whittaker.

== Episodes ==
No.	Title	Directed by	Written by	Original release date
1	"Halloween with the Addams Family"	Mark Jean	Story by : Keith Fowler & Phil Leslie; Teleplay by : Robert Baird & Kelly Senecal	October 19, 1998
Mistaking two robbers for trick-or-treaters, the Addams Family takes them in for a Halloween celebration. Meanwhile, Wednesday and Pugsley go trick-or-treating as Siskel and Ebert.
2	"Deadbeat Relatives"	Ron Oliver	Robert Baird & Kelly Senecal	October 20, 1998
At the time when the Addams Family are moonbathing, Wednesday recites an incantation that brings Cousin Vlad back to life. He wants to kill Gomez and marry Morticia.
3	"The Addams Family Goes to School"	Ron Oliver	Story by : Seaman Jacobs & Ed James; Teleplay by : Peggy Nicoll	October 21, 1998
The school board finds out that Wednesday and Pugsley have never been to school due to Grandmama being the one who educated them and sends a written order to Gomez and Morticia to enroll them at once. Gomez later gets a reaction when he hears that Grimm's Fairy Tales has a dragon getting killed. Family mentioned: Cousin Imar (who has three arms; Morticia knits a sweater for him where the purple brings out the color in his eye).
4	"Fester's Punctured Romance"	Harvey Frost	Story by : Jameson Brewer; Teleplay by : Peggy Nicoll	October 22, 1998
Uncle Fester's prison girlfriend Cruella breaks up with him upon making parole. Uncle Fester uses a dating service catalogue to hook up with a hateful woman named Lucretia. Uncle Fester mistakes a woman named Melinda Carver for her. Wednesday secretly administers a prick that contains a love potion called Love Potion 666 that Grandmama brewed which works too well. When Gomez and Morticia find out, they instruct Grandmama to make an antidote at once. Family mentioned: Grandpa Squid and Aunt Vendetta (who are in the attic as Gomez goes to check if they are still alive), Great-Uncle Zee (who was affected by Love Potion 666 and kept digging up Cassandra).
5	"New Neighbors Meet the Addams Family"	Randy Bradshaw	Story by : Hannibal Coons & Harry Winkler; Teleplay by : Peggy Nicoll	October 23, 1998
Newleyweds Hubert and Amanda Patterson move into the neighborhood and learn that the Addams Family are their next door neighbors and landlords. Gomez is more than willing to let the Pattersons out of their contract if they change their minds, but the realtor he hired to manage the house lies to both parties out of greed (as Gomez pays well); he claims the Petersons like the house, while lying Gomez will not let them out of the contract. After days of putting up with the Addams' unwanted visits, the Petersons head into WITSEC to get away; turns out this was the fourth time it's happened. Family mentioned: Aunt Blemish, Cousin Farouk (whose leg is sticking out of the shark on the Addams Family's wall).
6	"Grandpapa Addams Comes to Visit"	George Erschbamer	Story by : Byron Twiggs; Teleplay by : Peggy Nicoll	October 26, 1998
While his neighborhood is being rebuilt, Gomez' grandfather Grandpapa Addams comes to visit the family and live with them for awhile. While Grandpapa Addams still misses his late wife Delilah, Gomez and Morticia arrange for him to be sent to Club Dead, a senior's resort. Grandpapa fears that they are going to send him to a retirement home. His attempts to convince them of his sanity backfire, so they send him anyway. Grandpapa falls for woman at the home, who burned the place down; she oddly resembles Moritica. Family mentioned: Cousin Winkle (who often gets out of his coffin and sleepwalks; A parody of Rip Van Winkle with R.I.P. as an unspoken joke).
7	"Gomez, the Reluctant Lover"	Peter Rowe	Story by : Charles Marion; Teleplay by : Peggy Nicoll	October 27, 1998
Puglsey has developed a crush on his teacher and copies one of Gomez' love letters to Morticia. This causes her to think that Gomez wrote the letter.
8	"Morticia the Matchmaker"	Gary Harvey	Story by : Maury Geraghty & Hannibal Coons & Harry Winkler; Teleplay by : Peggy Nicoll	October 28, 1998
Cousin Melancholia's fiancé ran off and she shows up at the Addams Family Mansion in a despondent state. Morticia hooks her up with a law firm owner named Ralph Harvey when nobody else wanted the job. Family mentioned: Cousin Tracheal (who can smoke through her neck).
9	"The Addams Family Tree"	Harvey Frost	Story by : Lou Huston & Hannibal Coons & Harry Winkler; Teleplay by : Peggy Nicoll	October 29, 1998
After Wednesday gives Harold Pomeroy a black eye, his smug father Cecil shows up at the Addams Family mansion demanding an apology. Both Harold and Cecil have their different ooky experiences with the Addams Family members. Meanwhile, Professor Simms is hired to help research the Addams Family tree when they get interested in their genealogy. Family mentioned: Uncle Slackjaw (who is buried in the cemetery, though even Gomez is unsure if he is dead or not), Great-Grandpa Sludge (who had eight toes), Cousin Odd (whose photograph is next to Cousin Itt's photograph), Aunt Blemish (who Morticia mistook as a barn in an old photograph), Grandpa Slurp (who had a bucktooth on one head and a receding chin on another), Great-Uncle Matthews (who was the white sheep of the family for working as an accountant), the Nesbitt branch of the Addams Family who started a revolution and were beheaded.
10	"Cousin Itt Visits the Addams Family"	Don Shebib	Story by : Tony Bilson; Teleplay by : Peggy Nicoll	October 30, 1998
Cousin Itt stays at the Addams Family after his girlfriend Contessa found out about his other girlfriends Eudora, Simone, and Lucinda and that he is now broke. After attempts at different jobs, he gets one at the zoo...as an exhibit.
11	"Art and the Addams Family"	Harvey Frost	Story by : Harry Winkler & Hannibal Coons; Teleplay by : Peggy Nicoll	October 30, 1998
Wednesday comes back from school after getting an F for painting a black rainbow. Her teacher, Miss Crank, says she may fail art if she doesn't use color. Gomez tries to hire the world famous artist Leopold DaMinci as an art tutor, but gets Leo DaMinci, an Italian pizza delivery man instead. Meanwhile, Mama falls in love with the postman, and Fester helps her try to trap him.
12	"Thing is Missing"	Don Shebib	Story by : Lorraine Edwards; Teleplay by : Peggy Nicoll	November 2, 1998
It's Thing's birthday. Thing opens Fester's mail and Fester and the family yell at him for releasing Fester's bees and none of them remember his birthday, so Thing runs away. The stress of fighting with Thing causes Fester to start growing hair on his head. Note: The episode is based on a teleplay of the same name by Bill Lutz, which was written by Lorraine Edwards to The Addams Family. Family mentioned: Aunt Hatchet (who the state ordered to have confined to her room).
13	"Fester Goes on a Diet"	Gary Harvey	Story by : Harry Winkler & Hannibal Coons; Teleplay by : Lisa A. Bannick	November 3, 1998
Uncle Fester's internet girlfriend Yvette is coming to town. Feeling out of shape, Uncle Fester enlists the family into helping him lose weight. Meanwhile, Wednesday finds a magic kit owned by Uncle Ripper and plans to use Pugsley as her "magic assistant". Family mentioned: Uncle Ripper (who was a great magician), Cousin Phlegm (a deceased relative that was cremated and who Morticia spent weeks sweeping up after the urn was knocked down during a raid by the National Guard).
14	"Morticia's Romance: Part 1"	Ed Anders	Story by : Harry Winkler & Hannibal Coons; Teleplay by : Peggy Nicoll	November 4, 1998
On their 13th anniversary, Gomez and Morticia tell the kids about the time when Grandmama and Granny Frump wanted Gomez to marry Morticia's sister Ophelia while Morticia was to be married to Cousin Vlad. Family mentioned: Cousins Otis and Redding (Conjoined twins whose portraits are on the wall of the Addams Family mansion; they fought like cats and dogs where Otis wanted to work on his tan and Redding would only go outside when it is raining).
15	"Morticia's Romance: Part 2"	Ed Anders	Story by : Harry Winkler & Hannibal Coons; Teleplay by : Peggy Nicoll	November 5, 1998
Continuing with the story, Morticia, Gomez, and Uncle Fester summon Cousin Itt to woo Ophelia. After Cousin Itt gets cold feet upon being married, the wedding is back on where Morticia's wedding is rendered moot when Cousin Vlad dies from choking on a toothpick.
16	"Wednesday Leaves Home"	Harvey Frost	Story by : Harry Winkler, Hannibal Coons & Peggy Nicoll; Teleplay by : Peggy Nicoll	November 6, 1998
Wednesday gets in trouble with her parents for unleashing starving baby alligators into the sewer causing them to send Lurch to remedy to situation. Upon being grounded for animal cruelty where she is not allowed to play with her weapons, start any fires, and torture her brother, Wednesday runs away from home. When the family notices that she is missing, they enlist the police to help find her. Family mentioned: Grandpa Skank (Uncle Fester had a hard time finding where he buried him so that he can give him his medicine).
17	"My Fair Cousin Itt"	Ed Anders	Story by : Phil Leslie; Teleplay by : Peggy Nicoll	November 9, 1998
Upon hearing that Cousin Itt didn't get a part in Hamlet, Gomez dusts off an old play that he wrote where he casts Cousin Itt in the lead while hiring a director
18	"The Winning of Morticia Addams"	George Eschbaumer	Story by : Charles Marion; Teleplay by : Ron Burla	November 10, 1998
Uncle Fester reads an article that was written by Dr. Pierre LeBlanc that talks about "The Dangers of a Happy Marriage". It talks about how fighting would be necessary for a great marriage. He leads the rest of the family into getting Gomez and Morticia to fight each other. Family mentioned: Uncle Milo and Cousin Henrietta (Gomez suggested moving Uncle Milo on top of Cousin Henrietta due to the cemetery getting full)
19	"Uncle Fester's Toupee"	Peter Rowe	Story by : Harry Winkler & Hannibal Coons; Teleplay by : Ron Burla	November 11, 1998
Uncle Fester learns that a prisoner he's been emailing named Ginger (Diane Delano) is getting out and Fester has been claiming to her that he resembled George Clooney. With help from his family, Uncle Fester enlists a toupee salesman as he tries on each one including the ones that are left behind when the toupee salesman is scared off by Kitty Kat. Family mentioned: Cousins Otis and Redding (Gomez fired a rifle shot which ricocheted off their picture), Cousin Yorick (Morticia keeps his skull with an axe on it in her bedroom)
20	"Lurch Learns to Dance"	Gary Harvey	Story by : Jay Dratler; Teleplay by : Jay Dratler, Jerry Seelen, Charles Marion & Peggy Nicoll	November 12, 1998
Lurch has been invited to the Annual Butlers' Ball which is reluctant to go to because he can't dance. To help out Lurch, Morticia hires a dance instructor which does not go well for the dance instructor. On the night of the Annual Butler's Ball where Lurch goes dressed as Zorro, the dance instructor secretly advises everyone not to dance with him. Thing sees this happens and informs Morticia who infiltrates the ball dressed as a belly dancer. Family mentioned: Great-Uncle Madoc (he once sent Morticia a postcard where Gomez was pleased with his choice of crayon)
21	"Morticia and the Psychiatrist"	Ron Oliver	Story by : Hannibal Coons & Harry Winkler; Teleplay by : Peggy Nicoll	November 13, 1998
When Pugsley joins the Junior Troupers, he gives the house a thorough cleaning and throws out Uncle Fester's stockpile which leaves the family horrified. Morticia calls a psychiatrist about this and claims that Pugsley wants their attention. Family mentioned: Odin Adims (Wednesday digs into his grave)
22	"Melancholia Finds Romance"	George Erschbamer	Story by : Harry Winkler & Hannibal Coons; Teleplay by : Peggy Nicoll	November 16, 1998
Cousin Melancholia arrives with her latest fiancé Digby as Uncle Fester gets suspicious with him to the point where he thinks that he is a gold digger.
23	"Morticia's Favorite Charity"	Otta Hanus	Story by : Jameson Brewer & Elroy Schwartz; Teleplay by : Ron Burla & Elroy Schwartz	November 17, 1998
The Addams Family are going through stuff to donate to the charity auction. Gomez donates Pugsly's tiger-headed alarm clock when the charity won't accept Gomez' time machine causing Pugsly to sulk on top of the chimney. Now Gomez and Morticia must work to win the tiger-headed alarm clock back. Family mentioned: Aunt Gretch (she once gave Gomez and Morticia a crystal vase for a wedding gift which Gomez shattered claiming "Her gift should at least have some value"), Rulen the Ruthless Addams (an ancestor in the Dark Ages who Gomez met with his time machine)
24	"Morticia Joins the Ladies League"	Randy Bradshaw	Story by : Phil Leslie & Randy Bradshaw; Teleplay by : Peggy Nicoll	November 18, 1998
At the time when Morticia invites the PTA to her house, Pugsly is wanting to go to the circus to see Gorgo the Flying Gorilla. While concerned at first, Gomez does take Pugsly since to the circus since it is owned by his old friend Oscar Wilder. After becoming fast friends with Pugsley, Gorgo escapes from his cage to see Pugsley and starts to do Lurch's job.
25	"Morticia the Breadwinner"	Don McCutcheon	Story by : Phil Leslie; Teleplay by : Peggy Nicoll	November 23, 1998
26	"Morticia's Dilemma"	Ed Anders	Story by : Jerry Gottler & John Bradford; Teleplay by : Jerry Gottler, John Bradford & Nancylee Myatt	November 30, 1998
27	"Christmas with the Addams Family"	George Erschbamer	Story by : Hannibal Coons and Harry Winkler; Teleplay by : Ron Burla	December 7, 1998
Contrary to what would be believed, the Addams do celebrate Christmas, with slightly normal decor.
28	"Crisis in the Addams Family"	Ed Anders	Story by : Preston Wood; Teleplay by : Dan Gerson	January 4, 1999
29	"Gomez, the Cat Burglar"	Ed Anders	Story by : Phil Leslie; Teleplay by : Lisa A. Bannick	January 8, 1999
30	"Uncle Fester's Illness"	George Erschbamer	Story by : Bill Lutz; Teleplay by : Arnold Rudnick & Rich Hosek	January 11, 1999
31	"Green-Eyed Gomez"	Ed Anders	Story by : Keith Fowler & Phil Leslie; Teleplay by : Peggy Nicoll	January 15, 1999
32	"Thing's Romance"	Ed Anders	Story by : Leo Rifkin; Teleplay by : Peggy Nicoll	January 18, 1999
33	"Morticia, the Decorator"	Richard Martin	Story by : Alan Kent; Teleplay by : Peggy Nicoll	January 22, 1999
34	"Close Encounters of the Addams Kind"	George Erschbamer	Rich Hosek & Arnold Rudnick	January 25, 1999
35	"Amnesia in the Addams Family"	George Erschbamer	Story by : Phil Leslie & Keith Fowler; Teleplay by : Peter Elwell	February 1, 1999
36	"Wednesday's Crush"	Ed Anders	Story by : Jack Raymond; Teleplay by : Peggy Nicoll	February 8, 1999
37	"Morticia, the Sculptress"	George Erschbamer	Story by : Harry Winkler & Hannibal Coons; Teleplay by : Ron Burla	February 15, 1999
38	"Gomez, the People's Choice"	Ed Anders	Story by : Marvin W. Kaplan & Joseph Vogel; Teleplay by : Arnold Rudnick & Rich Hosek	February 22, 1999
39	"Lurch, the Teen-Age Idol"	Richard Martin	Story by : Caron Henning, Ed Ring & Mitch Persons; Teleplay by : Dan Kopelman	March 1, 1999
40	"Fester and Granny vs. Grandpapa Addams"	George Erschbamer	Story by : Lila Garrett & Bernie Kahn; Teleplay by : Sloan Nibley, Preston Wood, Rich Hosek & Arnold Rudnick	March 8, 1999
41	"Saving Private Addams"	Ron Oliver	Story by : Arnold Rudnick & Rich Hosek; Teleplay by : Sloan Nibley & Bill Lutz	March 15, 1999
42	"My Son, the Chimp"	Richard Martin	Story by : Don Quinn; Teleplay by : Henry Sharp, Arnold Rudnick & Rich Hosek	March 22, 1999
43	"Horseplay"	Ed Anders	Peggy Nicoll	March 29, 1999
44	"Lurch's Grand Romance"	George Erschbamer	Peggy Nicoll	April 5, 1999
45	"Fester Joins the Global Mercenaries"	Ed Anders	Peggy Nicoll	April 9, 1999
46	"Catastrophia's Career"	Richard Martin	Lisa A. Bannick	April 12, 1999
The Addams are visited by their perpetually unlucky cousin, Catastrophia (whom they never realize caused misfortune with her mere presence) after she loses another job.
47	"Addams Family in Court"	Nicholas Kendall	Story by : Hannibal Coons & Harry Winkler; Teleplay by : Lisa A. Bannick	April 19, 1999
48	"Cousin Itt's Problem"	George Erschbamer	Arnold Rudnick & Rich Hosek	May 7, 1999
Cousin Itt is going bald.
49	"Morticia, the Playwright"	George Erschbamer	Story by : Harry Winkler, Hannibal Koons, Rich Hosek & Arnold Rudnick; Teleplay by : Rich Hosek & Arnold Rudnick	May 14, 1999
50	"Lurch, Man of Leisure"	George Erschbamer	Rich Hosek & Arnold Rudnick	May 21, 1999
Lurch lied to his long-distance girlfriend that he was a millionaire. Impressed, Gomez and Morticia agree to play the part of his servants along with Uncle Fester and Grandmama. However, the woman turns out to be a golddigger, whom leaves once the ruse falls apart.
51	"Progress in the Addams Family"	Otta Hanus	Jill Boniske	May 28, 1999
52	"The Undercover Man"	Nicholas Kendall	Dan Kopelman	May 29, 1999
53	"Lurch and His Piano"	John Bell	Hilary Friedman & Sara Jane Sluke	May 31, 1999
Lurch tries to find a new instrument to play after his piano breaks.
54	"Fester the Marriage Counselor"	George Erschbamer	Steve Chivers & Curt Shepard	June 4, 1999
Fester tries his hand at helping couples fix their marriages.
55	"Cleopatra, Green of the Nile"	George Erschbamer	Rick Hosek & Arnold Rudnick	June 11, 1999
56	"Granny, the Happy Medium"	Ed Anders	Arnold Rudnick & Rich Hosek	June 18, 1999
57	"Lurch's Little Helper"	George Erschbamer	Dan Kopelman	June 25, 1999
58	"Addams Family Feud"	Jimmy Kaufman	Arnold Rudnick & Rich Hosek	July 10, 1999
The Addams Family's hillbilly cousins called the McAddams (consisting of Pa McAddams, Ma McAddams, Peewee McAddams, and Geezer McAddams) show up to settle the score of an old feud. Things go well until Uncle Fester takes Pa McAddams hunting and a gold nugget is discovered. The Addams are more than willing to give the nugget to their cousins, but have trouble doing so thanks to the McAddams being stubborn and poorly educated.
59	"Fester, the Tycoon"	George Erschbamer	Rich Hosek & Arnold Rudnick	July 17, 1999
60	"Lights, Camera, Addams!"	Jimmy Kaufman	Arnold Rudnick & Rich Hosek	July 24, 1999
61	"The Addams Policy"	Ed Anders	Rich Hosek & Arnold Rudnick	July 31, 1999
62	"Fester, World Leader"	Nicholas Kendall	Arnold Rudnick & Rich Hosek	August 7, 1999
63	"The Tale of Long John Addams"	George Erschbamer	Rich Hosek and Arnold Rudnick	August 14, 1999
64	"Keeping Up with the Joneses"	Mark Jean	Rob Baird & Kelly Senegal	August 21, 1999
65	"Death Visits the Addams Family"	George Erschbamer	Arnold Rudnick & Rich Hosek	August 28, 1999
Death comes to collect Gomez, despite his good health. The Addams have to outwit Death to keep the family together.

== Home media ==
As with many other Saban Entertainment series, the only major English-language DVD release is by Czech distributor North Video, featuring both Czech and English audio and original video (with English-language text) in the original production order. The first 39 episodes were released on 12 volumes, from February 15 to May 3, 2010.

== Reception ==
=== Awards and nominations ===
- Leo Awards for Best Overall Sound in a Dramatic Series – Tony Gronick (Nominated)
- Leo Award for Best Production Design in a Dramatic Series – Cathy Robertson (Nominated)
- Leo Award for Best Lead Performance by a Female in a Dramatic Series – Ellie Harvie (1999) (Nominated)
- Canadian Comedy Awards for Television – Performance – Female – Ellie Harvie (2000) (Nominated)
- Leo Award for Best Editing – Picture of a Music, Comedy or Variety Program or Series – Michele Conroy For episode "Tale of Long John Addams" (Won)
- Leo Award for Best Overall Sound in a Music, Comedy or Variety Program or Series – Rick Bal, Chester Biolowas, Vince Renaud, and Jo Rossi (Won)
- Leo Award for Best Screenwriter of a Music, Comedy or Variety Program or Series – Rich Hosek and Arnold Rudnick For episode "Tale Of Long John Addams" (Won)
- Leo Award for Best Performance or Host in a Music, Comedy or Variety Program or Series – Ellie Harvie (Won)
- Leo Award for Best Sound – Greg Stewart (Won)

== Video games ==
7th Sense developed a Game Boy Color game based on the series, which was released in 2001 by Microids exclusively in Europe. Titus Interactive was going to release the game in America with the title The New Addams Family, but the American version was cancelled. Nova Productions released an electric shock machine based on the series in 1999, which was distributed by H. Betti Industries in America.
