= Random Encounter (film) =

- Directed by: Douglas Jackson
- Written by: Matt Dorff
- Starring: Elizabeth Berkley
- Release date: September 18, 1998
- Country: Canada
- Language: English

Random Encounter is a 1998 movie directed by Douglas Jackson and written by Matt Dorff. It stars Elizabeth Berkley as a young and rising public relations executive who meets a strange man after a cocktail party, and is framed for murder.

== Reception ==
TV Guide said, "while such trashy cautionary tales can be hugely entertaining (take NO STRINGS ATTACHED, for example), this threadbare thriller is undermined by truly appalling performances."
