= Horsey (film) =

- Original movie poster
- Directed by: Kirsten Clarkson
- Written by: Kirsten Clarkson
- Produced by: Michele Sands
- Starring: Holly Ferguson] Todd Kerns
- Cinematography: Glen Winter
- Edited by: Melinda Friedman
- Music by: Hellenkeller
- Production company: Pyramid
- Release date: 1997
- Running time: 89 minutes
- Country: Canada
- Language: English

Horsey is a 1997 Canadian independent film starring Holly Ferguson and Todd Kerns that was directed by Kirsten Clarkson. Described in its tagline as "A Gritty Tale of Love, Ambition, and Addiction", the film was the first film for actors Kerns and Ferguson, as well as for director and writer Kirsten Clarkson. Although Ferguson would go on to act in several other films and TV series (including 2005's Dark Water), neither Kerns nor Clarkson would work on another film (as of 2007).

== Plot ==
The film features Kerns, a Canadian rock musician famous for his work with Age of Electric, as a heroin-addicted artist and rocker named Ryland Yale. Delilah Miller (Ferguson) is looking for an anchor in her life, and turns to Ryland as a stabilizing force. However, she soon finds that he is possessive and undependable. The film portrays the life and death struggles that ensue as Kerns faces addiction and Miller, a bisexual, tries to distance herself from Yale while also exploring her own emotional hangups.

== Cast ==
- Holly Ferguson as Delilah Miller
- Todd Kerns as Ryland Yale
- Ryan Robbins as Simon Leigh
- Victoria Deschanel as Lily Hiroshima
- Madeleine Kipling as Steffi Yale
- Tamara Rambaran as Carol Muldoon
- Michael Roberds as Manfred Fireburn
- Russ Hamilton as Jamie Alyosha
- Tara Lea as Mrs. Black
- Laura Arcangeli as Jane Yale

== Notes ==
The film, which was a rookie effort by nearly all involved, received widespread distribution throughout Canada through Rogers Video, but received little critical acclaim. The film is primarily of sentimental interest to fans of Kerns' or Ferguson's other work, because it was the first major acting performance by both of them.
