= Jordi Caballero =

Actor, dancer, choreographer, writer, and producer for stage

Jordi Caballero (born February 5, 1965) is a Spanish actor, dancer, pianist, reality show personality, choreographer, writer, and producer for stage, film, and television. He is a member of the Producers Guild of America, SAG-AFTRA, Actors' Equity Association, and ASCAP. Caballero received a Best Supporting Actor nomination at the 2003 Method Fest Independent Film Festival for his role as Captain Madrid in the film I Witness co-starring James Spader and Jeff Daniels. He has also been a two-time American Choreography Award nominee. As an actor, Caballero is known for portraying characters of Spanish, Italian and Euro-Mediterranean descent. Most recently he played Eugenio Martínez in the limited television series Gaslit starring Julia Roberts and Sean Penn.

== Early career ==
Caballero’s love for the American way led him to the U.S. to pursue a career in acting and the performing arts. He earned a BFA in acting at New York University, Tisch School of the Arts. During this period, he also cultivated his evolving interests in dance/performance art including theatrical and Latin styles. It was not long after that Caballero’s multiple talents as an actor, dancer, and choreographer brought him work in television, film and stage venues.

== Acting career ==
One of Caballero’s first major television appearances was as a love interest to the character of Carrie Bradshaw on the HBO show Sex & The City. Several roles followed on shows such as Alias, Scrubs, CSI: Miami, The Unit, Nip/Tuck, The Shield, Entourage, Brothers & Sisters, Rules of Engagement and Justified.

The romantic comedy Snow Days starring Bernadette Peters marked the beginning of Caballero’s film career. He has brought his combination of acting and movement talents to bear in such high-profile films as Alex & Emma, Rent, and Pirates of the Caribbean: The Curse of the Black Pearl.

In 2007, he was an associate producer and co-star of Valentina’s Tango, opposite celebrated tango master Guillermina Quiroga.

In 2022, he appeared in 4 episodes of the limited television series Gaslit starring Julia Roberts and Sean Penn. Caballero plays Eugenio Martínez, one of the five men recruited to execute the Watergate burglary.

== Dance and choreography ==
Caballero has worked for musical artists such as Cher, Madonna, Usher, Tony Bennett, Macy Gray and Jane’s Addiction among many others. In 2008 he choreographed for the Return of the Spice Girls tour. In 2018 and 2019 Caballero toured as a guest artist with Andrea Bocelli.

In 2021, Caballero danced as Camila Cabello's father in the music video for Don't Go Yet, choreographed the latin segment of Ed Sheeran's music video Shivers, and performed as a conductor who dances at his music stand in a widely-aired commercial for Toyota.

Several television shows have called on Caballero’s talents. In 2006 he performed for The 78th Annual Academy Awards. In 2006 and then 2009 he performed on Dancing with the Stars. He has also appeared as a choreographer and guest judge on Bravo’s Step It Up and Dance in 2008, and worked on Dirty Dancing: The Time of Your Life for UK television. In 2019 he was the Supervising Choreographer for the season premiere of Dancing with the Stars.

== Writing ==
Caballero has lent his writing talents to several projects, including Tinder Tango, the World Choreography Awards, and the documentary El último hit analógico: Macarena.

His play Ghost Town was a finalist in the 2022 Brisk Festival L.A.

== Producing ==
Over the past several years Caballero has emerged as a producer of original entertainment, including Tango Shalom, Tango Mania, A Perfect Vintage, The Last Analog Hit: Macarena, La Carga, After the Rain, Dancing For My Havana, and the World Choreography Awards.

== Composing ==
Trained in the classical music arts and piano at the age of 8 at the Municipal conservatory of Barcelona, Caballero has produced, composed, and licensed his music for several TV shows and films, including Step It Up and Dance.

His original music includes such compositions as The Music Box, Soledad y Esperanza, Lagrimas, and Conversaciones.

== Filmography ==
=== Film ===
Year(s)	Title	Role	Notes
1995	Let It Be Me	Competitor	
1999	Snow Days	Jean-Claude	
1999	The Stranger	Chief of Police	
2002	Kid Bang	Flamenco Stud	
2003	I Witness	Captain Madrid	
2003	Pirates of the Caribbean: The Curse of the Black Pearl	Pirate	Uncredited
2003	Alex & Emma	Flamenco Dancer #3	
2005	Rent	Dancer	Uncredited
2005	America 101	El Coyote	
2006	Poseidon	Ballroom Dancer	Uncredited
2006	Hell Hath Blue Skies	Speed	
2007	Valentina's Tango	Eduardo	
2007	Sublime	Friar Lazaro Mate	
2008	Dark Streets	Slim	
2008	Yes	Nollie	Short
2008	Reservations	Gustavo	
2013	2 Dead 2 Kill	Salvatore Anigo Mander	
2013	Desperate Acts of Magic	Arnie Deal	
2015	Broken Horses	Mario Vargos Garza	
2016	True Memoirs of an International Assassin	Choreographer / Dance Double Masovich	
2016	The Load	Fernando Hidalgo de la Rocha	
2017	Trust Fund	Marcello	
2017	Ferdinand	Balloon Vendor (voice), Additional Voices	
2021	Tango Shalom	Jose Hernandez	

=== Television ===
Year(s)	Title	Role	Notes
1993	Another World	Pedro	5 episodes
1994	As the World Turns	Marco	
1998	Sex and the City	Mario	
1998	All My Children	Leonardo	
1999	Los Beltrán	Senor Sabelotodo	
2000	The Geena Davis Show	Victor	
2002	My Wife and Kids	Joe	
2003	The Bold and the Beautiful	Toro	5 episodes
2003–2009	General Hospital	Mo Verde / Roberto	4 episodes
2004	Scrubs	Massimo	
2004	Alias	Technician / The Plumber	2 episodes
2005	Nip/Tuck	Quentin - Dance Double	
2005	CSI: Miami	Julio Elias	
2005	The Tonight Show with Jay Leno	Jay Leno Impersonator	
2006	Passions	Large Man #3	7 episodes
2006–2007	The Shield	Aldo Melchor	2 episodes
2007	Brothers & Sisters	Mario	
2007	Viva Laughlin	Marino	
2007	Heartland	August Pena	
2007	Entourage	Police Chief	
2008	The Unit	Octavio Sr.	
2008	Days of Our Lives	Claude	2 episodes
2008	Out of Jimmy's Head	Mexican Newscaster	Episode: "Stunts"
2008	Step It Up and Dance	Himself as a judge	Episode: "Perfect Partners"
2009	Rules of Engagement	Mr. Vargas	
2010–2011	Justified	Gio Reyes	2 episodes
2011	Human Target	Hector Lopez	2 episodes
2012	Grimm	Soledad Marquesa	Episode: "Three Coins in a Fuchsbau"
2015	The Crossroads of History	Rodrigo	Episode: "Columbus"
2016	Gilmore Girls: A Year in the Life	Tanguero	Episode: "Fall"
2016–2019	Tango Mania	Destino/Tanguero	4 episodes
2018	Disjointed	Stiff Narrator	Episode: "4/20 Fantasy"
2021	The Ellen DeGeneres Show	Giorgio Giovanni Fabrizio Fabioli	Episode 3, Season 19
2021	Jimmy Kimmel Live!	Self	Episode: "Ben Affleck/Jay Ellis/The Record Company"
2022	Gaslit	Eugenio Martínez	4 episodes
2023	What If...?	Additional Voices	

=== Videogames ===
Year(s)	Title	Role
2004	Syphon Filter: The Omega Strain	Italian Thug A / Italian Thug B
2004	Grand Theft Auto: San Andreas	Pedestrian
2007	Spider-Man 3	Additional Voices
2010	Red Dead Redemption	The Local Population
2016	Uncharted 4: A Thief's End	Additional Voices
2016	Mafia III	Nino Santangelo
2020	Mafia: Definitive Edition	Salvatore
