= Cover Story (2002 film) =

2002 film directed by Eric Weston

- Directed by: Eric Weston
- Written by: Ron Base
- Produced by: Michael Frislev; Chad Oakes
- Production companies: Cover Story Films; Aladdin Entertainment
- Release date: 2002
- Running time: 100 minutes
- Country: Canada
- Language: English
- Budget: $2.5 million

Cover Story is a 2002 Canadian thriller film starring Elizabeth Berkley, Costas Mandylor, and Jason Priestley. Berkley plays a high-profile fashion magazine editor who is framed for murder while investigating a billionaire. It was directed by Eric Weston and produced by Nomadic Pictures. It was filmed in Calgary on a $2.5 million budget. It was released on DVD in 2005.
