= Kerner Optical =

American practical visual effects company

- Company type: Private
- Industry: Visual effects, Film production
- Founded: August 2006
- Defunct: August 2011
- Fate: Bankruptcy
- Headquarters: Kerner Blvd, San Rafael, California, United States
- Key people: Eric Edmeades

Kerner Optical was an American practical visual effects company based in San Rafael, California.

Originally the practical effects division of Industrial Light & Magic (ILM), it was spun off as an autonomous company in 2006. After five years of operating independently, Kerner declared bankruptcy and ceased operations in 2011.

== History ==
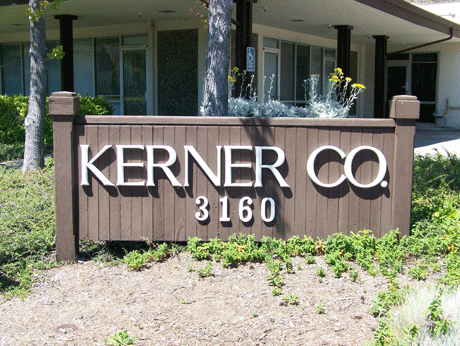
The Kerner Co. sign

Kerner's history dates to George Lucas's founding of Industrial Light and Magic. In the late 1970s, ILM moved to facilities in San Rafael, California, on Kerner Boulevard; the sign outside the building identified it as the Kerner Company. The company hid in plain sight and was known to locals, industry insiders, clients and suppliers as Kerner. George Lucas explained that the name Kerner was a "deception designed to keep kids from rummaging through garbage bins".

In 2006, the practical effects department was, like Pixar in 1986, spun off from Industrial Light & Magic. When George Lucas moved the computer graphics team to the Presidio of San Francisco in 2006, he sold five physical effects divisions of ILM in a management-led buyout that resulted in the creation of a new company that took on the name Kerner Optical as a tribute to the long history shared with ILM. Kerner continued to operate in the same property, in San Rafael, from which they had operated for over 30 years and the original "Kerner Co." sign is still displayed in front of the building.

In the three years after it left the Lucasfilm family, Kerner continued to provide practical special effects to major film productions

In addition to films, Kerner was selected in 2007 to build a three-dimensional scale model of the Disneyland Park in Anaheim, California for the Walt Disney Family Museum. Named the "Disneyland of Walt's Imagination," the model is displayed at Gallery 9 of the museum, which is located in the Presidio, not far from the extant ILM headquarters.

Kerner also continued several years of significant research and development in the areas of 3D camera rigs and consumer products. Kerner's creature shop manufactured lifelike, servo-controlled dummies with simulated injuries used for training military medics.

In August 2009, entrepreneur Eric Edmeades acquired a controlling interest in the business and became CEO of the group. In February 2011, Kerner filed for Chapter 11 bankruptcy protection in San Francisco. Despite record profitability during reorganization, investor and previous owner Kevin Duncan of Duncan Oil appealed to the courts to have Eric Edmeades replaced by a trustee, alleging mismanagement. Duncan was also an owner and member of the management team for each of the first three loss-making years during which the company incurred millions of dollars in debt. Duncan's petition forced the company to turn away at least two ILM contracts and ultimately, despite Edmeades having enough creditor votes to approve his reorganization plan, led to the closure of the company seven months after the original Chapter 11 filing. After refiling their bankruptcy under Chapter 7, the court ordered liquidation of their assets.

== Milestones ==
As Kerner Optical

- 2006: Kerner's solutions shop, Kernerworks, developed specialized hidden cameras designed to look like rocks to help capture the footage for The Cove.
- 2009: Kerner completes a 2-year project to build a detailed model, the centerpiece of the Disney Museum, that shows Disney the way Walt Disney saw it.
- 2009: Kerner and Emily Carr University of Art and Design established a stereoscopic Center of Excellence for the development of education and training for stereopgraphers.
- 2010:Kerner Group under new CEO Edmeades plans restructuring to aim 3D production
- 2011: Filed for Chapter 11 Bankruptcy
- 2011: Closed business.
- 2011, October 21–27: Court-ordered liquidation auctioning of equipment

== Selected filmography (as Kerner Optical) ==
Year	Notable films
2006	Pirates of the Caribbean: Dead Man's Chest
2007	Pirates of the Caribbean: At World's End; Evan Almighty; Transformers; Harry Potter and the Order of the Phoenix
2008	Iron Man; Indiana Jones and the Kingdom of the Crystal Skull; WALL-E (visual effects for live-action sequences); Pig Hunt; The Butler's in Love
2009	Star Trek; Transformers: Revenge of the Fallen; Terminator Salvation
2010	Killers

Kerner Optical worked on Transformers: Revenge of the Fallen, providing miniatures and pyrotechnics for the aircraft carrier crash, the bridge destruction, and various building collapse sequences, among others.v

Kerner Optical worked on Terminator Salvation, providing miniatures and pyrotechnics for the Very Large Array, the dilapidated building collapse, various aircraft explosions, and Serena's Tower, among others.

Kerner Optical also worked on the J. J. Abrams film Star Trek and the Ashton Kutcher film Killers.

== Notable employees ==
- Adam Savage
- Grant Imahara
- Tory Belleci
