= Shavick Entertainment =

Canadian film and television production company

- Industry: Film production; Television production
- Founded: 1993; 33 years ago
- Headquarters: Vancouver, British Columbia, Canada
- Owner: James Shavick; Joy MacPhail
- Subsidiaries: OUTtv
- Website: shavickentertainment.com

Shavick Entertainment is a Canadian film and television production company, owned and operated in Vancouver, British Columbia by James Shavick and his wife, former British Columbia politician Joy MacPhail. The company has primarily produced television films, most notably the Donald Strachey mystery series starring Chad Allen, as well as a few theatrical films and a number of television series, including The New Addams Family, Los Luchadores, Young Blades and Breaker High.

The company also owns a majority interest in the Canadian specialty channel OUTtv. Prior to 2012, Pink Triangle Press and Peace Point Entertainment were also minority partners in the channel, but Shavick bought out their shares in 2012.

The firm was established in 1993, after Shavick returned to Canada from a stint as a producer with RKO Pictures.
