= Step It Up and Dance =

- Genre: Reality
- Country of origin: United States
- Original language: English
- No. of seasons: 1
- No. of episodes: 10

Production
- Running time: 44 minutes

Original release
- Network: Bravo
- Release: April 3 – June 8, 2008

Step It Up and Dance is an American reality television competition series where contestants are supposed to "learn what it takes to make it big in the cutthroat dance industry". Actress and dancer Elizabeth Berkley serves as host, and director and choreographer Jerry Mitchell mentors the 12 dancers chosen from around the country as they learn a variety of dance styles. Director and choreographer Vincent Paterson and choreographer Nancy O'Meara serve as judges for the competition.

The show premiered on April 3, 2008, on Bravo.

== Contestants ==
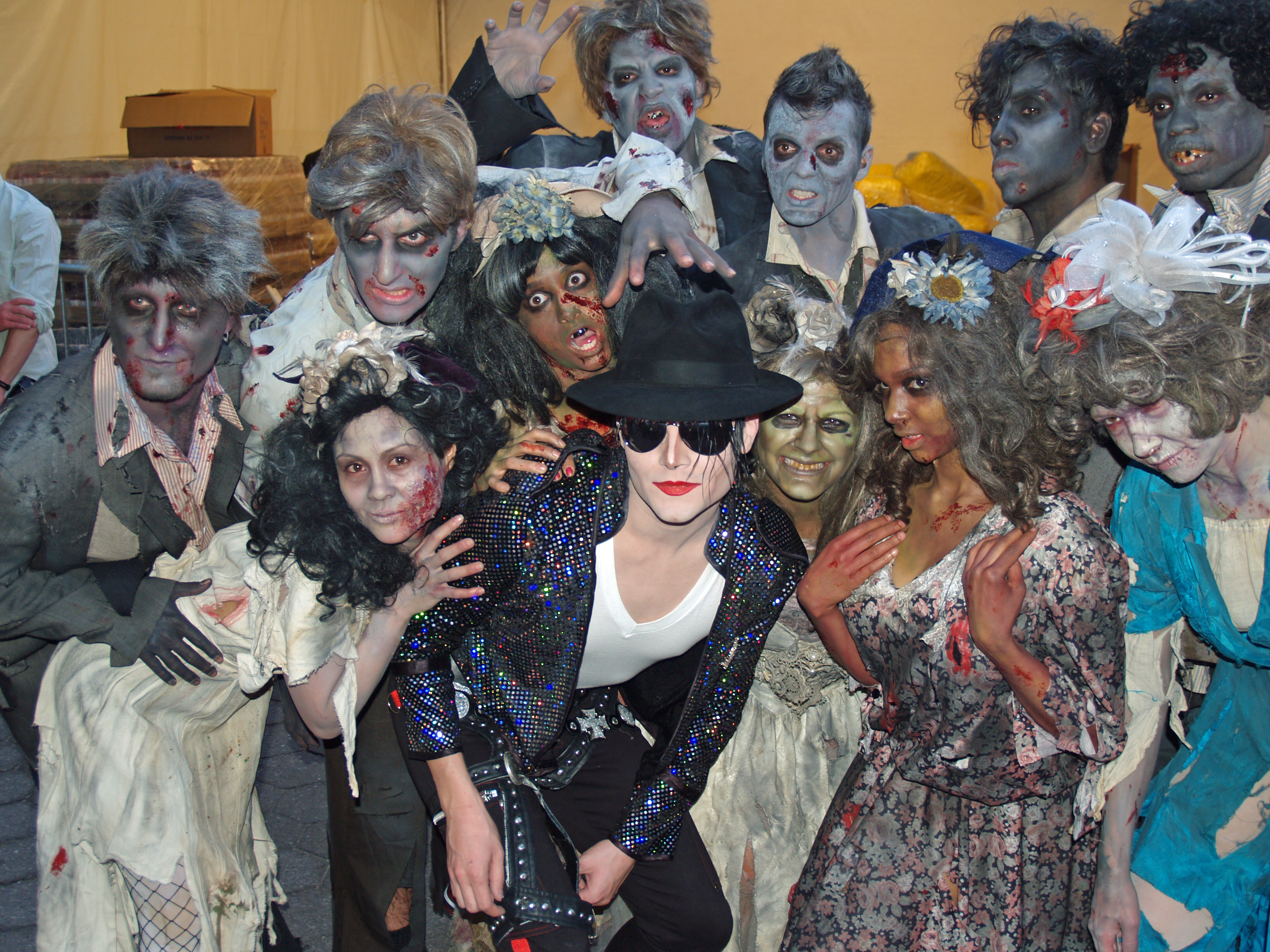
Contestants dressed as zombies perform for the 25th anniversary of the album Thriller at the 2008 Tribeca Film Festival (with a Michael Jackson impersonator.

(in order of elimination)

- Nicole Berrong, 29, from Farmington Hills, MI - Withdrew
- Adriana Falcon, 25, from Shrewsbury, MA
- James Alsop, 23, from Charlotte, NC
- Jessica Feltman, 22, from San Luis Obispo, CA - Withdrew
- Tovah Collins, 21, from Chicago, IL
- Michael Silas, 24, from Houston, TX
- Oscar Campisi, 31 from Bologna, Italy
- Janelle Ginestra, 18, from Modesto, CA
- Miguel Zarate, 24, from Delano, CA
- Nick Drago, 26, from Houston, TX
- Michelle "Mochi" Camaya, 30, from San Diego, CA
- Cody Green, 27, from Surrey, Canada - Winner

== Eliminations ==
Dancer Elimination Progress
	1	2	3	4	5	6	7	8	9	10		Episode
Cody	SAFE (-)	HIGH (+)	SAFE (-)	SAFE (+)	WIN (+)	WIN	LOW	SAFE	LOW	SAFE	WIN	10 - Finale (Part 2)
Michelle	SAFE (+)	SAFE (+)	LOW (-)	SAFE (+)	HIGH (+)	SAFE	WIN	HIGH	HIGH	WIN^{6}	OUT	10 - Finale (Part 2)
Miguel	SAFE (+)	LOW (-)	SAFE (-)	WIN (+)	SAFE (-)	HIGH	HIGH	SAFE	LOW	SAFE	OUT	10 - Finale (Part 2)
Nick	SAFE (-)	SAFE (+)	LOW (-)	SAFE (-)	SAFE (+)	SAFE	HIGH	WIN	WIN	SAFE	OUT	10 - Finale (Part 2)
Janelle	WIN (+)	SAFE (-)^{2}	WIN (+)	SAFE (-)	SAFE (+)	LOW	LOW	LOW	OUT			9 - Finale (Part 1)
Oscar	LOW (-)	WIN (+)	SAFE (-)^{3}	LOW (-)	OUT (-)		WIN^{4}	OUT				5 - Major League Broadway; 8 - Dancing In The Rain
Michael	SAFE (+)	LOW (-)	HIGH (+)	HIGH (+)	LOW (-)	OUT						6 - Modern Meltdown
Tovah	LOW (-)	SAFE (+)	HIGH (+)	OUT (-)			OUT					4 - Gotta Have Rhythm
Jessica	SAFE (+)^{1}	SAFE (-)	OUT (-)				WD^{5}					3 - Battle Zone
James	HIGH (+)	OUT (-)					OUT					2 - Baring It All
Adriana	OUT (-)						OUT					1 - A Scary Surprise
Nicole	WD (-)											1 - A Scary Surprise

- ^Note 1: The judges told Jessica that she would have been going home due to her performance had she had not been in the winning group.
- ^Note 2: The judges told Janelle that she would have been going home due to her performance had she not won immunity from the prior challenge.
- ^Note 3: The judges told Oscar that he would have been going home due to his performance had he not won immunity from the prior challenge.
- ^Note 4: For this challenge, Oscar won the right to return to the competition. Also, the judges found it unfair to eliminate someone else after bringing back Oscar. Therefore, no one else was eliminated.
- ^Note 5: Jessica and the other eliminated dancers were brought back for a shot to come back in this challenge. However, she dropped out due to an inner ear infection, which meant Miguel danced as a solo.
- ^Note 6: Michelle's win is referred to the first performance to Fergie's song.

Blue background and WIN means the dancer won that challenge.
Red background and OUT means the dancer lost and was out of the competition.
Light blue background and HIGH means the dancer had one of the highest ratings for that challenge.
Pink background and LOW means the dancer had one of the lowest ratings and was in the bottom three for that challenge.
Orange background and LOW means the dancer was in the bottom two for that challenge.
Yellow background and WD means the dancer withdrew from the competition.

== Episodes ==
=== Episode 1: A Scary Surprise ===
The dancers arrive in Los Angeles and unknowingly begin the competition by dancing in a nightclub. Based on their performance in the nightclub, the dancers are divided into a winning group and losing group. Both groups perform in front of the judges, with one member of the winning group winning immunity for the next week and one member of the losing team going home. Both teams performed to the Spice Girls song, "Spice Up Your Life". Notable events include Jessica running off the stage during the winning group's performance, Adriana getting eliminated, and Nicole leaving the show due to an injury. Jessica was told that if she weren't on the winning team, she would be immediately eliminated.

- PARTNERS:
  - Adriana and Cody
  - Janelle and James
  - Jessica and Michael
  - Michelle and Miguel
  - Nicole and Nick
  - Tovah and Oscar
- Judges: Elizabeth Berkley, Vincent Paterson, Nancy O'Meara
- Guest Judges: Jamie King & Mel B
- WINNER: Janelle
- OUT: Adriana
- WITHDRAWN: Nicole (due to an injury)
- First aired April 3, 2008

=== Episode 2: Baring It All ===
The dancers perform the French Apache. To separate the dancers into winning and losing groups, they had to demonstrate their skills with a partner while displaying the drama and character the dance requires. Notable highlights include Jessica redeeming herself, Janelle being told that immunity was the only thing that saved her elimination, and Michael is unanimously voted as the weakest link of the losing team but he still manages to make it through to the next challenge. At this point, Michelle is the only dancer to have been in the winning group both times.

- PARTNERS:
  - Janelle and James
  - Michelle and Miguel
  - Janelle and Michael
  - Michelle and Oscar
  - Tovah and Nick
  - Jessica and Cody
- Judges: Elizabeth Berkley, Vincent Paterson, Nancy O'Meara
- Guest Judges: Cati Jean, Carolina Cerisola
- WINNER: Oscar
- OUT: James
- First aired April 10, 2008

=== Episode 3: Battle Zone ===
The dancers are taught hip-hop techniques. After performing, guest judge Dave Scott selected three crew leaders based on their performance. After learning a routine, each team faced off against each other. After the face-offs, Red Everest was voted as the winning group, while Breakin Blues and BT Slam were the elimination groups.

- PARTNERS:
  - Red Everest: Janelle, Michael, Tovah
  - Breakin Blues: Cody, Michelle, Jessica
  - BT Slam: Miguel, Nick, Oscar
- Judges: Elizabeth Berkley, Vincent Paterson, Nancy O'Meara
- Guest Judges: Dave Scott & Robert Hoffman
- WINNER: Janelle
- OUT: Jessica
- First aired April 17, 2008

=== Episode 4: Gotta Have Rhythm ===
The dancers learned stomp techniques from Luke Cresswell. The winning team performed a stomp routine with trash cans and the elimination team performed a stomp routine with brooms.

- Judges: Elizabeth Berkley, Vincent Paterson, Nancy O'Meara
- Guest Judges: Luke Cresswell
- WINNER: Miguel
- OUT: Tovah
- First aired April 24, 2008

=== Episode 5: Major League Broadway ===
- PARTNERS:
  - Janelle and Michael
  - Michelle and Miguel
  - Nick and Cody
- Judges: Elizabeth Berkley, Vincent Paterson, Nancy O'Meara
- Guest Judges: Jason Alexander, Lee Martino
- WINNER: Cody
- OUT: Oscar
- First aired May 1, 2008

=== Episode 6: Modern Meltdown ===
Winning teams and elimination teams are no more as everyone is eligible for the win and the elimination. In the audition, two teams of three were formed. The first team consisted of Cody, Michelle, and Nick. The second team consisted of Janelle, Michael, and Miguel. For the callback performance, the two teams had to create their own dance to Gwen Stefani's "The Sweet Escape".

- Judges: Elizabeth Berkley, Vincent Paterson, Nancy O'Meara
- Guest Judges: Jacques Heim
- WINNER: Cody
- OUT: Michael
- First aired May 8, 2008
- Cody is the First person to win 2 challenges in a row.

=== Episode 7: Perfect Partners ===
The eliminated competitors return to compete with those remaining in a Latin-themed dance. As an added challenge, the judges inform the contestants that one of the eliminated dancers will have a chance to return to the show, potentially knocking someone else out of the competition. Notable highlights include Oscar returning, Jessica had to go to the hospital because she had a surgery, and no one being eliminated.

- Judges: Elizabeth Berkley, Vincent Paterson, Nancy O'Meara
- Guest Judges: Jordi Caballero
- WINNER: Michelle
- First aired May 15, 2008

=== Episode 8: Dancing in the Rain ===
The dancers have a lesson in music video choreography under the watchful eye of guest judge Tina Landon. In the audition, contestants have to learn Landon's choreography for Rihanna's song "Umbrella". For the callback performance, two teams (under the leadership of audition winners Nick and Cody) have to choreograph their own dance segments to coordinate with the dance they learned earlier.

- Judges: Elizabeth Berkley, Vincent Paterson, Nancy O'Meara
- Guest Judges: Tina Landon
- WINNER: Nick
- OUT: Oscar (again)
- First aired May 22, 2008

=== Episode 9: Finale, Part 1 ===
The dancers are challenged to choreograph Michael Jackson's "Man in the Mirror".

- Judges: Elizabeth Berkley, Vincent Paterson, Nancy O'Meara
- Guest Judges:
- WINNER: Nick
- OUT: Janelle
- First aired 2008-05-29
- Nick is the 2nd person to win 2 challenges in a row behind Cody also from season 1.

=== Episode 10: Finale, Part 2 ===
The dancers take part in a final challenge and perform their solos for the judges.

Challenge

- Judges: Elizabeth Berkley, Vincent Paterson, Nancy O'Meara
- Guest Judge: Akon
- WINNER: Michelle

Group Song: "Labels Or Love" by Fergie

Finale

- Judges: Elizabeth Berkley, Vincent Paterson, Nancy O'Meara
- OVERALL WINNER: Cody

Solo Song: "It's Over" by TJ Moss

- First aired 2008-06-05

== Reception ==
The series premiere was Bravo's highest-rated in the 10PM time slot ever, with 826,000 viewers, among whom 574,000 were aged 18 to 49. The show continued to perform well throughout its run, averaging 756,000 viewers each week - of whom 522,000 were aged 18 to 49 - and helped contribute to Bravo's highest-rated April ever.

There has been no talk of a second season of the show - despite it performing well in the ratings - and its page has been removed from Bravo's website. The series was officially canceled on April 14.
