= NYPD Blue season 7 =

Season of television series

NYPD Blue
- Season 7
- Season 7 U.S. DVD cover
- No. of episodes: 22

Release
- Original network: ABC
- Original release: January 11 – May 23, 2000

Season chronology
- ← Previous; Season 6 Next → Season 8

The seventh season of NYPD Blue premiered on ABC on January 11, 2000, and concluded on May 23, 2000.

== Cast ==
Actor	Character	Main cast	Recurring cast
Dennis Franz	Andy Sipowicz	entire season	—N/a
Rick Schroder	Danny Sorenson	entire season	—N/a
James McDaniel	Arthur Fancy	entire season	—N/a
Kim Delaney	Diane Russell	entire season	—N/a
Gordon Clapp	Greg Medavoy	entire season	—N/a
Nicholas Turturro	James Martinez	episodes 1–6	—N/a
Andrea Thompson	Jill Kirkendall	entire season	—N/a
Bill Brochtrup	John Irvin	entire season	—N/a
Henry Simmons	Baldwin Jones	episodes 7–22	—N/a

Actor	Character	Main cast	Recurring cast
Sheeri Rappaport	Officer Mary Franco	—N/a	episodes 1–5, 8, 10, 14–16
John F. O'Donohue	Eddie Gibson	—N/a	episodes 3 & 9
Erich Anderson	Don Kirkendall	—N/a	episodes 1–2, 4, 6
Scott Cohen	Det. Harry Denby	—N/a	episodes 5–6
Debra Monk	Katie Sipowicz	—N/a	episodes 3, 9, 16
James Pickens Jr.	Lt. Joe Abner	—N/a	episodes 7, 9–10
Frank Vincent	Dino Ferrera	—N/a	episodes 11, 17
Elizabeth Berkley	Nicole Graf	—N/a	episodes 17, 19

== Episodes ==
No. overall	No. in season	Title	Directed by	Written by	Original release date	Prod. code	U.S. viewers (millions)
133	1	"Loogie Nights"	Mark Tinker	Story by : David Milch & Bill Clark; Teleplay by : Matt Olmstead	January 11, 2000	0E01/5701	19.13
Sipowicz and Sorenson are disgusted by two cops who may have beaten a man to death and expect investigators to cover for them when their stories don't pan out. A grieving Sipowicz and his young son, Theo, struggle to adjust to life at home without Sylvia. Despite her better judgment, Detective Jill Kirkendall contemplates a reunion with her ex-husband Don. Danny meets a uniformed officer named Mary Franco and they hook up in a limited, awkward fashion. Notes: Kevin Dillon guest stars as Officer Neil Baker
134	2	"A Hole in Juan"	Steven DePaul	Story by : David Milch & Bill Clark; Teleplay by : Jody Worth	January 18, 2000	0E02/5702	16.87
Russell discloses important information about Don's criminal activities to Kirkendall which strains their relationship, while they try to solve the death of a hooker's baby, and Jill gives Don an ultimatum. Sipowicz and Sorenson take pity on a recent parolee who has a fatalistic attitude when one of his friends turns up murdered. Notes: Tawny Cypress guest stars as Rosana Booth.; The fact that ABC decided to begin the season in January rather than October or November is reflected by a line here about a witness standing around "in the hot sun", because the series always began its seasons with episodes set during the brutal New York City summertime.
135	3	"The Man With Two Right Shoes"	Mark Tinker	Story by : David Milch & Bill Clark; Teleplay by : Meredith Stiehm	January 25, 2000	0E03/5703	17.90
Russell, Kirkendall and Martinez sense that a young boy is being exploited by his adult teacher. Sipowicz, Sorenson and Medavoy investigate the vicious murder and castration of an out-of-towner who hired male prostitutes on his frequent trips to New York City, while Andy and PAA John Irvin find an effective way to deal with some firefighters who might have taken more than evidence from the crime scene. Notes: First appearance of John F. O'Donohue as Eddie Gibson. He earlier appeared as Court Clerk in episodes 2.1 & 2.2.; Dana Wheeler-Nicholson guest stars as Jenny Peters, the teacher exploiting her student.; Sam Lloyd guest stars as Larry.
136	4	"The Naked Are the Dead"	Bob Doherty	Story by : David Milch & Bill Clark; Teleplay by : Leonard Gardner	February 1, 2000	0E04/5704	16.72
In the aftermath of a particularly horrific crime — even by NYPD standards — seven young men are found naked and murdered in one room, and a profiler is sent to the precinct to help with the investigation. Sipowicz struggles not to let his contempt for the profiler get in the way of their job and has to deal with an incompetent younger cop, but the explanation for the mass murder turns out to be pathetic and pedestrian. Don makes a stupid mistake that could threaten Jill's career, and Lt. Fancy convinces the idiot that he either plays ball and stops threatening Jill's career or he spends 20 years in prison no matter what he says, and Greg and James investigate a warehouse theft that ended with a kid dead from a broken neck and leads to his dumber-than-Don brother.
137	5	"These Shoots Are Made for Joaquin"	Jeff McCracken	Story by : Bill Clark & Lee Hubbard; Teleplay by : Lee Hubbard	February 8, 2000	0E05/5705	13.85
Sipowicz and Sorenson investigate the murder of a man who was shot in front of his wife and whose brother appears to be the hero for trying to catch the shooter. Diane meets with Det. Denby, who is running the drug case that Don is involved in, and finds out he's as disgusting as Don is. James learns that he passed the Sergeant's exam and shares the news with a supportive but saddened Greg. Notes: David Zayas guest stars as Joaquin
138	6	"Brothers Under Arms"	Jake Paltrow	Story by : David Milch & Bill Clark; Teleplay by : Matt Olmstead	February 15, 2000	0E06/5706	14.35
Sipowicz and Sorenson trace the path of a young man's gun which was used in a homicide and now threatens to destroy his own family, and Andy once again tries very hard to show he's no longer racist in the face of disapproval from the suspect's mom; Kirkendall faces a showdown with Don that ends with theft and Don being killed and burned beyond recognition; and the fraternity of the 15th Precinct promises to remain intact even as Detective James Martinez bids farewell. Note: Last appearance of Nicholas Turturro as James Martinez.; Tina Lifford guest stars as Lorraine Wiggins, the suspect's mother.
139	7	"Along Came Jones"	Farrel Jane Levy	Story by : David Milch & Bill Clark; Teleplay by : Jody Worth	February 22, 2000	0E07/5707	15.91
Sipowicz and Sorenson investigate the murder of a cop whose extramarital affair with his partner may have led to his seemingly random murder. Diane indirectly lets Jill know what happened to Don. Baldwin Jones arrives and quickly impresses the other cops with his strength and smarts, and begins his partnership with Greg. Lt. Fancy spars with Baldwin's former boss, Lt. Abner. Notes: First appearance of Henry Simmons as Baldwin Jones.; Amy Carlson guest stars as Lisa Marantz.; James Pickens Jr. stars as Lt. Abner, he had previously appeared on the first season episode titled "Personal Foul" playing a postal worker named Nathan Foster.
140	8	"Everybody Plays the Mule"	Mark Tinker	Story by : David Milch & Bill Clark; Teleplay by : Meredith Stiehm	February 23, 2000	0E08/5708	12.40
Medavoy and his new partner, Detective Baldwin Jones, join Sipowicz and Sorenson as they investigate the peculiar disappearance of two young boys on a trail that leads them to a racist, deranged Russian man. But Sipowicz is a bit skeptical of Jones, the new guy, and doesn't try to hide it. Danny treats Mary Franco dismissively and seems more interested in Diane. Diane and Jill investigate a girl who died as a drug mule and gets a suspect to incriminate himself. Notes: Episode aired on Wednesday; Raymond Cruz guest stars as Rico. He earlier appeared as Raoul in the episode "Heavin’ Can Wait" (1995); Pasha D. Lychnikoff guest stars as racist John Shenkov. He earlier appeared as Dimitri in the episode "Burnin' Love" (1996); Silas Weir Mitchell guest stars as Luke. He earlier appeared as Tony in the episode "Remembrance of Humps Past" (1997)
141	9	"Jackass"	Steven DePaul	Story by : David Milch & Bill Clark; Teleplay by : Matt Olmstead	February 29, 2000	0E09/5709	15.38
A young boy is suspected of killing his mother's abusive boyfriend; and Fancy tries to neutralize the ongoing tension from Lt. Abner but comes to realize that Abner is seriously depressed and wonders whether he should call an NYPD intervention unit. Sipowicz is asked by an old friend named Eddie Gibson to take out Gibson's niece, triggering worries for Andy (who hasn't dated since Sylvia's death) and resentment from his ex-wife Katie.
142	10	"Who Murders Sleep"	Karen Gaviola	Story by : David Milch & Bill Clark & W.K. Scott Meyer; Teleplay by : W.K. Scott Meyer	March 7, 2000	0E10/5710	15.50
Sipowicz and Sorenson reopen an unsolved case involving a missing little girl when a small body is discovered buried in a wall. But they hit a snag when they find the detective who worked the case eight years ago, and now retired, slowly sliding into senility. Andy offers emotional support when a troubled Sorenson is plagued by persistent nightmares but it's Diane whom he ultimately confides in. Medavoy and Jones resort to a bit of theatrics when their slam-dunk shooting case is hampered by a pet owner who refuses to let them retrieve a bullet from her dog's nose that's needed as evidence.
143	11	"Little Abner"	Bob Doherty	Story by : David Milch & Bill Clark; Teleplay by : Jody Worth	March 14, 2000	0E11/5711	15.10
Lieutenant Fancy tries to rebuild his relationship with Lt. Abner, but is left devastated when he runs out of time, while a concerned Detective Jones offers his support. Sipowicz and Sorenson investigate the murder of a club owner who had quite a way with the ladies, and Andy helps out a married man who snapped when the lothario had an affair with his wife. Jones takes out his frustration on a creep who a woman claimed raped and beat her, but is going to walk free because a video shows she was lying about the rape and that means no prosecution. Notes: Peter Jurasik guest stars as club owner Dave Lorinz. Jurasik previously worked closely with Dennis Franz as "Sid the Snitch" on both Hill Street Blues and its short-lived sequel Beverly Hills Buntz.; Regina Hall guest stars as Sharice Warner; Frank Vincent guest stars as Dino 'The Rat' Ferrera
144	12	"Welcome to New York"	Peter Markle	Story by : David Milch & Bill Clark; Teleplay by : Meredith Stiehm	March 21, 2000	0E12/5712	15.14
Administrative aide John Irvin uses intuition to point Sipowicz and Sorenson in the right direction as they investigate a possible love triangle homicide. Kirkendall and Russell help a fragile young woman recount her horrific gang rape and deal with her overprotective parents.: Misha Collins guest stars as Blake DeWitt
145	13	"The Irvin Files"	Dennis M. White	Story by : David Milch & Bill Clark; Teleplay by : Leonard Gardner	March 28, 2000	0E13/5713	15.16
Sipowicz and Sorenson nearly lose their sense of humor as they investigate the theft of very expensive art and are forced to match wits with Noel Beller (Stanley Kamel), the snotty, eccentric and well-to-do owner of the missing works. Medavoy and Jones pursue the trail of a missing woman and are perplexed by the behavior of her 'distraught' husband.: Tuc Watkins guest stars as Derrick
146	14	"Sleep Over"	Matthew Penn	Story by : David Milch & Bill Clark; Teleplay by : Matt Olmstead	April 4, 2000	0E14/5714	15.48
As Sipowicz and Sorenson investigate the home invasion robbery of an elderly couple, they are annoyed by the interference of the couple's abrasive daughter and a subservient retired cop who does more harm than good. Medavoy and Jones get the case of a wealthy woman who has a vendetta against her former maid. And Sorenson's frequent informant, J.B., seems headed for disaster, so Danny intervenes at the expense of his relationship with Mary.
147	15	"Stressed for Success"	Donna Deitch	Story by : David Milch & Bill Clark; Teleplay by : Kim Newton	April 11, 2000	0E15/5715	15.56
JB's sad fate leads Danny Sorenson to an emotional crisis which impacts him deeply, and he seeks comfort from Diane after blowing off Mary Franco. Kirkendall tries to help a young mother who steals for her unemployed abusive husband; the case ends in tragedy when an overzealous anti-crime officer, Laughlin, gets involved. And John Irvin lends his assistance on a case involving stolen vintage clothing.: Mos Def guest stars as Leslie Peach
148	16	"Goodbye Charlie"	Mark Tinker	Story by : David Milch & Bill Clark; Teleplay by : Jody Worth	April 18, 2000	0E16/5716	15.24
A young man and his girlfriend show up at the squad to report the murder of his parents, and the who!e squad heads out to investigate. Medavoy is visited by Charlie (Keone Young), an old friend who fears trouble with the Chinese mafia. Danny seems to rebound from his personal problems and restarts his relationship with Mary Franco.: A.J. Buckley guest stars as Roger Lundquist; Angell Conwell guest stars as Sugar Griffin
149	17	"Roll Out the Barrel"	James McDaniel	Story by : David Milch & Bill Clark; Teleplay by : Matt Olmstead	April 25, 2000	0E17/5717	13.10
A dismembered body is found in a barrel in the basement of a brownstone. The detectives' trail leads them to a notorious mobster who has a long list of enemies, but they soon learn the mobster is connected to a different murder case. Andy has to deal with a hostile ME whose anger at Andy is not personal. And Detective Jones helps an attractive radio reporter break a big story and receives clear signals in return. Note: Elizabeth Berkley guest stars as Nicole Graf; Marc Vann guest stars as Harry Forsic; Frank Vincent guest stars as Dino 'The Rat' Ferrera; M. Emmet Walsh guest stars as Dr. Joe Kroft; Pat Crawford Brown guest stars as Old Woman at the crime scene
150	18	"Lucky Luciano"	Clark Johnson	Story by : David Milch & Bill Clark; Teleplay by : Hugh Levick	May 2, 2000	0E18/5718	15.79
A panic-stricken young woman tries to convince Kirkendall and Russell that her twin sister has become the victim of foul play; and Sipowicz and Sorenson investigate an Italian immigrant's possible involvement in the murder of his wealthy but unpopular wife. Anthony (Mario Bosco), a 27-year-old apparent teenager, comes to their aid when they are unable to prove conspiracy charges about the immigrant. Notes: Alimi Ballard guest stars as Marcus Potter; Richard Libertini guest stars as Luciano Baca; Amy Aquino guest stars as Anna
151	19	"Tea and Sympathy"	Joe Ann Fogle	Story by : David Milch & Bill Clark; Teleplay by : Ami Canaan Mann	May 9, 2000	0E19/5719	14.11
The detectives welcome the assistance of a pair of British detectives in the stakeout of a sadistic rapist-murderer; and Detective Jones gets up close and personal with the grateful reporter he helped on a previous homicide. Notes: Elizabeth Berkley guest stars as Nicole Graf; John Standing guest stars as Jimmy Cheatham
152	20	"This Old Spouse"	Bob Doherty	Story by : David Milch & Bill Clark & Ted Shuttleworth; Teleplay by : Ted Shuttleworth	May 16, 2000	0E20/5720	14.02
Once again, Diane Russell reluctantly finds herself in a dangerous standoff with undercover narcotics agent Harry Denby, who may know the truth about Kirkendall's ex-husband. Sipowicz and Sorenson investigate a husband's claims about his wife and the ex-con they're housing, and Diane and Jill uncover a home-repair scam.: Alley Mills guest stars as Sonya Morrow, the crack-head wife who house and partake in robberies with the ex-con.
153	21	"Bats Off to Larry"	Steven DePaul	Story by : David Milch & Bill Clark; Teleplay by : Leonard Gardner	May 23, 2000	0E21/5721	16.69
Sipowicz endures every parent's nightmare as young Theo's visit to the doctor reveals a problem; the subject of Kirkendall's ex-husband strains Jill and Diane's partnership, but they work together to solve the brutal murder of a rapist. Danny and Andy consider some horrible options related to Don's return and Jill's actions regarding her ex. A father and son don't have wonderful motives for taking revenge on someone who wronged a family member.
154	22	"The Last Round Up"	Mark Tinker	Story by : David Milch & Bill Clark; Teleplay by : David Milch	May 23, 2000	0E22/5722	16.69
Lt. Fancy tells Diane that the NYPD is ready to close in on Jill for her relationship with Don. Diane lets an angry Jill know the truth, and Jill tells Diane why Don has leverage over her. The squad comes together to deal with the Don situation once and for all. Andy stays by Theo's side as his son goes through tests to see whether or not he has cancer. An interdepartmental shakeup leads to permanent change. Note: This was Andrea Thompson's last appearance as Jill Kirkendall.
