= Nancy O'Meara =

American actress

- Born: Boston, Massachusetts, U.S.
- Occupations: Dancer, choreographer, actress
- Years active: 1994-present
- Website: nancyomeara.com

Nancy O'Meara is an American dancer, choreographer and occasional actress.

O'Meara was born and raised in Boston, Massachusetts, and was trained in multiple forms of dance.

O'Meara has worked with Paula Abdul, and many other performers in TV, films, and music. She worked on the choreography for High School Musical: The Concert. O'Meara choreographed the 2004 tour for Puerto Rican singer Chayanne.

She was a judge on Bravo's dance reality series Step It Up and Dance in 2008.

In 2025, O'Meara was part of the KAR’s Pro:tégé Performer Program in 2025.

== Selected Filmography ==
- Showgirls (1995)
- Infinity (1996)
- Boys and Girls (2000)
- From Justin to Kelly (2003)
- 13 Going on 30 (2004)
- Clerks II (2006)
