= Elizabeth Berkley =

American actress

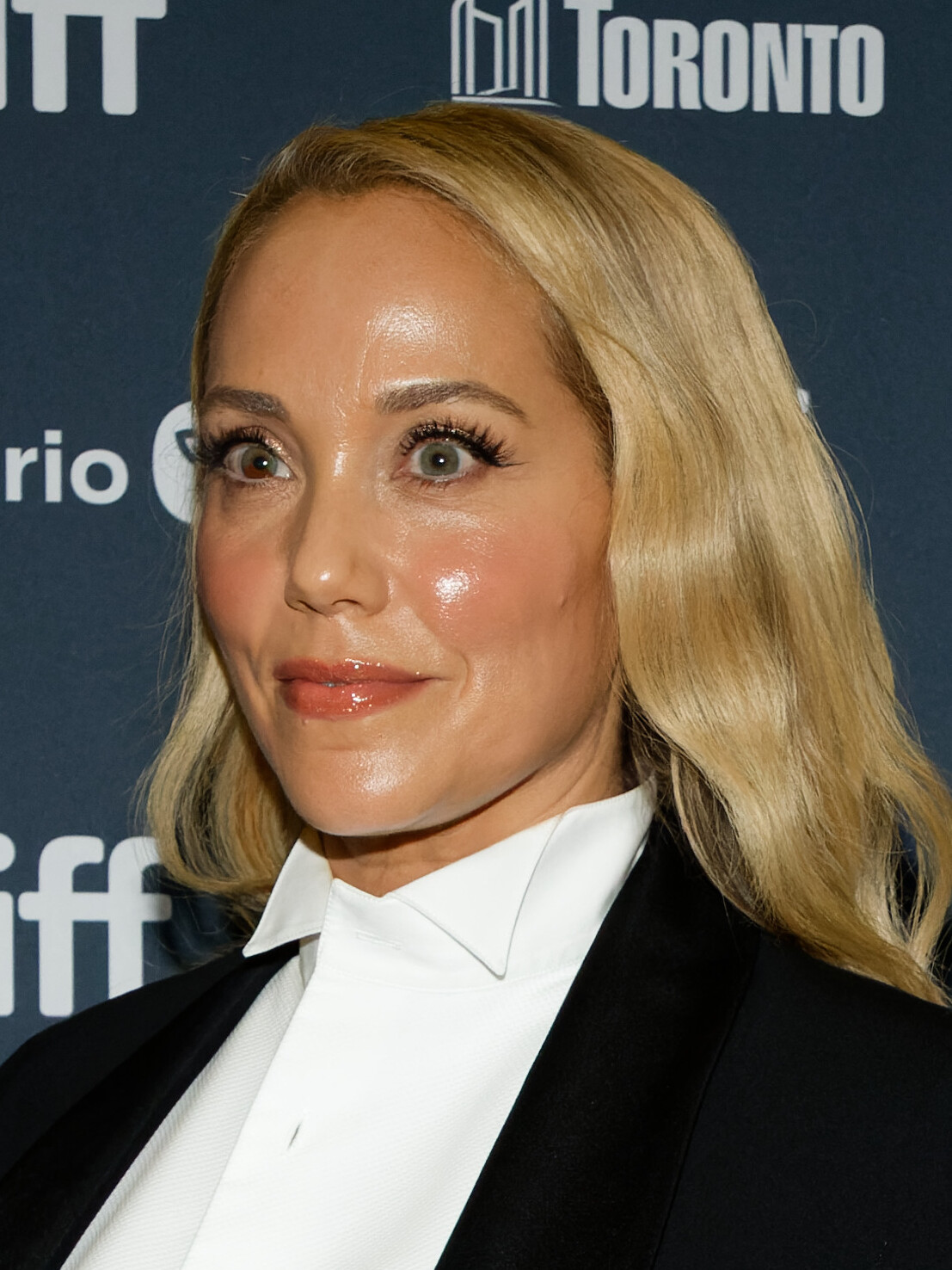
- Berkley in 2024
- Born: Farmington Hills, Michigan, U.S.
- Other name: Elizabeth Berkley Lauren
- Occupations: Actress; producer; former model
- Years active: 1986–present
- Spouse: Greg Lauren (m. 2003)
- Children: 1
- Awards: NBR Award for Best Cast; 1996 The First Wives Club

Elizabeth Berkley (/ˈbɜːrkli/ BURK-lee) is an American actress. She is best known for playing Jessie Spano in the Saved by the Bell television franchise and Nomi Malone in the controversial 1995 film Showgirls. She had supporting roles in the box office hits The First Wives Club and Any Given Sunday, as well as in The Curse of the Jade Scorpion and Roger Dodger.

On television, she played Julia Winston in CSI: Miami (2008–2009), Kelly Wentworth in The L Word (2009), Shannon Titus in Titus (2001–2002) and in 2020 she reprised the role of Jessie Spano in the Saved by the Bell reboot on Peacock, for which she also served as a producer. In theatre, she appeared opposite Eddie Izzard in Peter Hall's West End production of Lenny and also in the Broadway comedic play Sly Fox and the Off-Broadway production of Hurlyburly, for which she received critical acclaim. She also hosted Bravo's talent show Step It Up and Dance and in 2011 she published the New York Times best-seller Ask-Elizabeth, a self-help book for adolescent girls, which drew from the workshops she conducted for her Ask-Elizabeth program.

For Saved by the Bell she earned four Young Artist Award nominations and in 1996 she received a National Board of Review award for the ensemble acting in First Wives Club.

== Early life ==
Elizabeth Berkley was born in Farmington Hills, Michigan, to Jere and Fred Berkley. Her mother was a gift-basket business owner and her father was a lawyer. She has an older brother, Jason. Her family is Jewish and she was raised in a Conservative Jewish household, celebrating her bat mitzvah at Beth Abraham Hillel Moses in West Bloomfield. She was born with heterochromia iridis: her right eye is half green and half brown, while her left eye is green.

At age four, Berkley began taking jazz and tap lessons with Barbara Fink of Miss Barbara's Dance Center in Detroit and later took ballet classes with the professional company Dance Detroit. She would also practice at home in a room her parents set up for her in the basement. She danced Swan Lake with principals from the American Ballet Theatre and for five years she performed in the New York City Ballet holiday production of The Nutcracker in Detroit. Her dance recital song-and-tap number Hey Look Me Over eventually convinced her she wanted to be an actress.

== Career ==
=== Theatre and early film and TV roles ===
While attending Cranbook Kingswood in Bloomfield Hills, she enrolled in acting and singing classes, making her theatrical debut as Snoopy in a Cranbrook Theatre production of You're a Good Man, Charlie Brown. She continued her training with the Detroit-based company Actors Alliance and starred in two plays, Twain by the Tale and Raft of the Medusa. Professional stage roles soon followed in regional theatre, earning her an Actors Equity card when she was still in middle school. She played Baby June in the musical Gypsy (Village Players, Birmingham) and Echo in Lee Blessing's Eleemosynary at the Ann Arbor Repertory theatre. In 1980, she auditioned for the film version of Annie but was turned down because she was too tall.

She also ventured into modeling, initially doing print work for Hudson's and other regional outlets and later appearing in TV commercials for department stores in Atlanta, Milwaukee and Canada. She would use her modeling income to commute to Los Angeles and New York to train with professionals, including dancer and choreographer Joe Tremaine, vocal coach Seth Riggs and Broadway Dance Center's Frank Hatchett.

After writing a personal letter to TV producer Norman Lear asking him to make her a star, she received a reply from Lear's assistant, who encouraged her to reach out whenever she was in Los Angeles. Three years later, during a family vacation in California, she contacted his office and Lear helped her setting up with talent agent Judy Savage, of The Savage Agency. That led to her television debut in one episode of Gimme a Break! and her film debut in the critically acclaimed short film Platinum Blonde, both filmed in 1986. Berkley commuted to Los Angeles on every school break and summer vacation, taking acting classes with Diana Hill and Nora Eckstein of the recently established Young Actors Space and landing roles in Silver Spoons and the WonderWorks TV film Frog.

Still a teenager, she joined the New Faces division of Elite Model Management in New York (alongside other up-and-coming models like Cameron Diaz) after placing as a finalist in their Look of the Year contest. In the fall of 1988, her family eventually relocated to Los Angeles when she was still attending North Farmington High School. She signed with Elite's LA division, appeared in YM magazine's November issue as a finalist in the Cover Girl contest and guest starred in episodes of Day by Day and TV 101.

=== Saved by the Bell and TV fame (1989–1994) ===
After losing the leading role of Rennie in Friday the 13th Part VIII: Jason Takes Manhattan, she auditioned for a regular role in the NBC Saturday-morning sitcom Saved by the Bell. During the final callback, the producers of the show could not decide whether to cast Tiffani-Amber Thiessen or her for the part of Kelly Kapowski. In the end, Thiessen landed the role but Berkley's audition was so impressive that she was ultimately given another leading character, Jessie Spano, a civil-minded student with strong feminist views. The show debuted in August 1989 and aired on prime-time for three weeks, before relocating to its designated timeslot on Saturday morning. It quickly turned into a fan-favorite among young audiences, and its six teenage leads became television stars, appearing in teen magazines and on mall tours all around the country.

During the show's breaks over the years, Berkley landed guest starring roles in other popular shows like Life Goes On, Married People and The Hogan Family. In 1991 she even appeared in Kathryn Bigelow's Point Break but her small role as a surf shop countergirl was later cut. Soon after graduating from Calabasas High School, she began training with acting coach Roy London and left Saved by the Bell ahead of time during its fourth and final season, along with co-star Tiffani Amber Thiessen, to focus mainly on feature films. The transition from small to big screen turned out to be a difficult one, though, and Berkley worked mainly for television for the following two years, landing roles in Baywatch, Step by Step, Raven, Diagnosis: Murder, Burke's Law and Crossroads. She also starred in the straight-to-video film Molly & Gina and in the TV movies Saved by the Bell: Hawaiian Style and Bandit Goes Country. In January 1993 she was featured in the Crystal Pepsi commercial that debuted during the Super Bowl XXVII. During this time, she enrolled at UCLA to study English Literature.

=== Showgirls backlash and the beginning of film career (1995) ===
In the spring of 1994, Carolco Pictures opened the casting for the leads in Paul Verhoeven's new film Showgirls, the script of which Berkley had retrieved months earlier while the movie was still in development. Feeling a strong connection to the main character, she conducted thorough research, visiting strip clubs in Los Angeles, Las Vegas and New York, and interviewing strippers at venues such as Stringfellow's, Palomino and Scores. Despite resistance from her agent at Metropolitan Talent Agency, Berkley personally called Showgirls producer Charles Evans, introducing herself as Nomi. At her first audition with Paul Verhoeven she told him he might as well stop looking for other actresses because there was no one else who could play that role. During the extensive casting process, which saw many A-listers auditioning, Berkley briefly reprised the role of Jessie Spano in Saved by the Bell – Wedding in Las Vegas before heading to Idaho to film the Disney Channel adventure movie White Wolves II: Legend of the Wild. While on location at Yellowstone National Park, she received the call that she had booked the lead in Showgirls. Verhoeven later remarked: "We didn't have any more hesitation when we met again Elizabeth Berkley.”

Once the casting announcement was official, Berkley signed with Creative Artists Agency and began an intensive 12-week rehearsal period with choreographer Marguerite Derricks and the dance ensemble hired for the film. During this preparation phase, she ran into Demi Moore at one of the clubs in Los Angeles, where Moore was conducting research for her role in Striptease. Shooting for Showgirls commenced in Nevada in October 1994 and lasted four and a half months, concluding in March 1995. During this time, Berkley reportedly often danced for up to 16 hours a day, seven days a week, never requiring a body double.

In May 1995, Berkley and Paul Verhoeven attended the Cannes Film Festival to present an 8-minute preview of the film. "I was introduced at Cannes to the world as a movie actress and that was something that was very special," she recalled. The movie was given a previously agreed-upon NC-17 rating in the United States (the first big-budget film to do so) and was released to 1,388 theaters in North America on September 22, 1995. Despite the massive marketing campaign, Showgirls was a box-office bomb during its original theatrical run and was widely panned by critics, garnering a level of controversy and hostile criticism rarely seen in recent cinema. Berkley's performance was particularly targeted: Todd McCarthy described it in Variety as "harsh, graceless and quickly tiresome", and Barbara Shulgasser of the San Francisco Examiner, after comparing her to a Barbie doll, added: "That Berkley cannot act is indisputable". Only a few critics appreciated Berkley's work: Roger Ebert in The Chicago Sun Times wrote that her "fierce energy [was] always interesting", and Entertainment Weekly remarked that "the electricity of her anger" made her "a true, leonine presence".

The storm of criticism that followed quickly turned into personal vilification, with reviewers labelling her a "meat puppet on a stick" or, as critic Gene Siskel stated on national television, "not sexy, not particularly appealing and not attractive". Janet Maslin of The New York Times wrote that Berkley displayed "the open-mouthed, vacant-eyed look of an inflatable party doll". and the Chicago Tribune opined that she was "quite convincing when asked to play a girl who is not too bright". Berkley was later awarded two Razzie Awards as Worst Actress of the Year and Worst New Star. A journalist, whose name Berkley never revealed, began his interview asking her: “How does it feel to be a failure?”

Reflecting on the Showgirls backlash, Berkley later commented: "There was so much cruelty around it. I was bullied. And I didn't understand why I was being blamed. The job as an actor is to fulfill the vision of the director. And I did everything I was supposed to do. No one associated with the film spoke up on my behalf to protect me. I was left out in the cold and I was a pariah in the industry I had worked so hard for." Verhoeven often took responsibility for the way Berkley's performance was perceived and criticized. Soon after the release of the film, he stated: "Certainly I am partly, or in large degree, responsible. I asked her to do it that way." In an interview with Rolling Stone in 2015, he again made it explicit that he felt as if he was to blame for Berkley's performance: "People have, of course, criticized her for being over-the-top in her performance. Most of that comes from me. I pushed it in that direction. Good or not good, I was the one who asked her to exaggerate everything — every move — because that was the element of style that I thought would work for the movie." Film producer Scott Rudin publicly defended her, declaring: "I was impressed with her and her professional attitude about her job. I think what she's been through must be about as hard as I can imagine anything being for an actress". In the wake of the film's negative fallout, Berkley made a reportedly "tempestuous" exit from Creative Artists Agency, and spent the following week meeting with ICM, William Morris Agency, and United Talent Agency, ultimately signing with the latter. Willing to rehabilitate her image, she embarked alone on an international promotional tour across major territories, including Spain, Italy, Germany, Australia, Taiwan and Hong Kong.

=== Resurgence, independent cinema and London's West End (1996–1999) ===
After the controversial release of Showgirls, Berkley was met with total resistance from most filmmakers and casting directors, many of whom wouldn't even agree to meet with her. Only a handful of prominent directors stepped up, expressing interest in testing her for leading roles in their upcoming films. Among them were Milos Forman (for The People vs. Larry Flynt), Oliver Stone (for U-Turn), Luc Besson (for The Fifth Element) and Michael Bay (for Armageddon). "It was inspiring, actually comforting to have them trust me and support me and embrace my work," she shared. In her quest to find a follow-up project, the actress returned to acting classes with coach Howard Fine, starting again from level 1. She also trained under Uta Hagen.

In December 1995, Sherry Lansing, chairwoman at Paramount Pictures, asked Berkley to test for a supporting role in The First Wives Club, a comedy starring Diane Keaton, Goldie Hawn, and Bette Midler. After several auditions, Berkley eventually booked the part, the first one after the Showgirls backlash. The First Wives Club was released in September 1996 and was a surprise hit, grossing over $100m at the box office. Berkley's small role as naive actress Phoebe LaVelle earned her positive reviews, and the entire cast won the National Board of Review for "Best Ensemble Performance". A more substantial supporting role followed in Tom DiCillo's independent film The Real Blonde. Although DiCillo initially wanted her for the lead role of Sahara, the supermodel airhead eventually played by Bridgette Wilson, Berkley expressed her desire to play Tina, a dark-haired Madonna body-double. The movie premiered at the Sundance Film Festival before getting a limited theatrical release on February 27, 1998.

She briefly returned to television when she starred in the HBO thriller Random Encounter and in one episode of the anthology series Perversions of Science. She was also tapped as a regular cast member for the unaired ABC pilot L.A. Med and voiced the title character in the animated sci-fi film Armitage III – Polymatrix. For her supporting role as a Russian girl living in Brighton Beach in Avi Nesher's independent drama Taxman, she studied with a dialogue coach at Berlitz for two months. Reviews were favorable: The Hollywood Reporter appreciated the "nicely understated Elizabeth Berkley, sporting a credible Russian accent" and The San Francisco Examiner acknowledged, "Berkley, who is called on to deliver lines in Russian, seems to be out to prove that she really can act. She can". According to Variety, "the beautiful Berkley added a few moments of relief" and Box Office admired the "convincing, well-chosen cast". Berkley then starred in the psychological drama Last Call, by Chilean director Christine Lucas and in Malcolm Ingram's road movie Tail Lights Fade, but neither film was able to find theatrical distribution in the U.S.

In the fall of 1998, she landed a role in Oliver Stone's football drama Any Given Sunday as Mandy, Al Pacino's high-priced call girl. The movie received mixed reviews but it was a financial success, earning $100 million worldwide. In May 1999, Sir Peter Hall cast her as Lenny Bruce's wife in his London West End production of Lenny, starring Eddie Izzard. The play debuted at Queen's Theatre in July 1999 and had a limited 12-weeks run, due to Izzard's previous commitments. Berkley's portrayal of Honey Harlow (renamed Rusty Blaine in the play) impressed the critics. The Times dubbed her performance "a convincingly vulnerable portrayal" and the Evening Standard described Rusty as a "dejected stripper whom Elizabeth Berkley endows with lovely erotic languor and a true dancing talent." According to The Guardian, co-stars "David Ryall, Elizabeth Berkley and James Hayes lend good support" and The Independent described Berkley's performance as "impressive."

=== Critical affirmation and Broadway (2000–2007) ===
After a recurring role in the seventh season of NYPD Blue and a co-starring part in the E! original comedy Becoming Dick, Berkley booked a supporting role in Woody Allen's period-comedy The Curse of the Jade Scorpion, which debuted at the Venice Film Festival in 2001. That same year, it was announced that she would take on the role of Roxie Hart in the Broadway musical Chicago but it ultimately didn't happen for undisclosed reasons. She managed to exhibit her musical talents anyway, by taking part in the 2001 Divas Simply Singing annual benefit concert at the Wilshire Ebell Theatre in Los Angeles, where she sang a rendition of the song "Fever".

After playing Shannon Titus in three episodes of the sitcom Titus, she co-starred in the independent black comedy Roger Dodger, opposite Campbell Scott and a debuting Jesse Eisenberg. The movie won the inaugual Tribeca Film Festival and the Best First Film prize at the Venice Film Festival, before opening in selected theatres to rave reviews. Berkley's performance was unanimously praised. Edward Guthmann of the San Francisco Chronicle wrote: “Berkley registers here with an affecting, natural performance. She is the big revelation. See for yourself: She's very, very good.” Both USA Today and Richard Roeper of Ebert & Roeper called her performance “terrific”, the New York Times appreciated her “sharp supporting turn”, US magazine applauded her “pitch perfect supporting turn”, Time Out New York described her performance as “lively and nuanced” and Lou Lumenick of the New York Post wrote that she was “excellent”.

Other well-reviewed roles came afterwards in the Lifetime original drama Student Seduction and the Canadian dramedy Moving Malcolm, which got a Special Mention from the First Film Jury at the Montreal World Film Festival. In October 2004, she landed a role in her first Broadway show, the comedy Sly Fox. Directed by Arthur Penn and starring Richard Dreyfuss and Eric Stoltz, the production opened in Broadway in April 2004, after an out-of-town tryout at the Shubert Theatre in Boston and 22 previews at the Ethel Barrymore Theatre in New York.

The following year, she replaced Catherine Kellner as Bonnie in the 2005 off-Broadway production of David Rabe's Hurlyburly, appearing with Ethan Hawke, Parker Posey, and Bobby Cannavale. Berkley had three days to learn the part and received praise for her performance, with Charles Isherwood of The New York Times even going as far as publicly apologizing to her for his past criticisms of her ability, stating that the fact she held "her own among this skilled company of scene-stealers is a testament to how much her talent has grown." Between 2004 and 2007, she lined up some high-profile guest starring roles in the shows Without a Trace, Threshold and Law & Order: Criminal Intent and played a black widow in the TV movie Dark Beauty.

In 2005 and in 2006, she appeared in the annual 24 Hour Plays in Broadway, in which six writers, six directors and 24 actors have 24 hours to write, direct, and perform six 10-minute plays. Both her comedic stints impressed critics: among them, Jason Zinoman of The New York Times ("an appealingly daffy Elizabeth Berkley Lauren" in an "excellent all-star cast"), Roger Friedman of Fox News (“she held her own live on stage with Tony-winner Cady Huffman, Andrew McCarthy and Cheyenne Jackson. She's ready for SNL!”), the New York Daily News (“Berkley did a Meryl Streep-worthy Spanish accent in the hilarious Toccata and Fugue”) and Theatre Mania (“Among the evening's top acting efforts, a ridiculously Spanish-accented Elizabeth Berkley”).

In 2006, she also starred in Douglas Carter Beane's critically acclaimed The Cartells: A Prime-Time Soap Opera, Live at Comix, opposite Joanna Gleason, Brian d’Arcy James, Pedro Pascal and David Rakoff.

=== Prime time success and hiatus (2008–2019) ===
In 2008, Berkley signed on to appear in a multi-episode arc in the sixth season of CSI: Miami, portraying Julia Winston, Horatio Caine's ex-lover and mother of his teenage son. All the episodes featuring Berkley ranked in the top 10 of the Nielsen ratings chart and Berkley's role ended appearing in four episodes, including the season finale, before being confirmed for the following season. Commenting on the high ratings during Berkley's appearances, TV Guide noted: "CSI: Miami, it should be reminded, returned to boffo ratings these past two weeks, and in this past Tuesday's special airing gave CBS its best numbers in that 10 o'clock slot in some five years. Do not underestimate the power of the Jessie Spano fan."

Due to the 2007-08 Writers Guild of America strike, which halted all scripted productions (including CSI: Miami), Berkley took on hosting duties for Bravo's reality series Step It Up and Dance, a competition featuring ten aspiring dancers competing for a cash prize of $100,000 and the opportunity to work with and perform for some of the country's top choreographers. The show, shot in late 2007 in Los Angeles, premiered in April 2008 and came out as Bravo's strongest ever in its time slot (10/11 C) with 826,000 viewers. The show continued to perform well throughout its run, averaging 756,000 viewers each week (of whom 522,000 were aged 18 to 49) and contributed to Bravo's highest-rated April ever.

During the hiatus of CSI: Miami, Berkley starred alongside David Arquette and Thomas Jane in Arquette's 3D short film The Butler's in Love, which premiered at Mann's Chinese Theatre in Los Angeles in June 2008 and opened the sixth annual HollyShorts Film Festival. She also made a cameo appearance in the independent comedy Women in Trouble and starred in the direct-to-video film S. Darko (the sequel to the cult hit Donnie Darko), where she played Trudy, a born-again Christian woman who becomes infatuated with her pastor. Following her successful nine-episode stint on CSI: Miami, Berkley starred in a multi-episode arc on the Showtime series The L Word during its sixth and final season. She played Kelly Wentworth, a straight woman who had a romantic relationship with Jennifer Beals' character Bette Porter, during college.

In August 2009, her appearance on the cover of People magazine alongside Mark-Paul Gosselaar, Mario Lopez, Lark Voorhies and Tiffani Thiessen, marked the first Saved by the Bell official reunion after the show's conclusion in 1994. In 2011, shortly after completing her national tour to promote her first book Ask-Elizabeth, Berkley played the lead role in the Hallmark Channel original film Lucky Christmas, about a struggling mother who wins the lottery but must recover her ticket from the glove compartment of her stolen car. The film premiered on November 12, 2011, and opened Hallmarks’ Countdown to Christmas for that year. Recognizing the material's wholesome nature, The New York Times nonetheless stated: “Besides the irrational plotting, Ms. Berkley and Mr. Gray-Stanford turn out to be a surprisingly believable, appealing couple-in-the-making.” The television movie marked Berkley's last project before taking a hiatus from full-time acting, as she announced her pregnancy in early 2012. Berkley and her husband, Greg Lauren, welcomed their first child, a boy, in July 2012.

In September 2013, Berkley accepted an offer to participate as a contestant in the 17th season of Dancing with the Stars, where she partnered with Valentin Chmerkovskiy. Despite receiving several perfect scores from the judges, the couple was eliminated in the 9th week of competition, finishing in 6th place.

During this period, Berkley still lined up a few comedic roles in episodic television: she played a rather unorthodox couple therapist in ABC Family's Melissa & Joey (opposite Melissa Joan Hart and Joey Lawrence) and Zooey Deschanel's irresponsible and lazy boss in the Fox sitcom New Girl. She also played the title role in Greg Lauren's short film The Fashion Designer, part of Six01 Studio's installation The Blackout, depicting New York archetypes. The installation was shown in Bryant Park in January 2014. Additionally, she reunited once again with Mark-Paul Gosselaar, Mario Lopez and Tiffani Thiessen on The Tonight Show Starring Jimmy Fallon, where they participated in a Saved by the Bell sketch with Fallon and Dennis Haskins.

=== Saved by the Bell reboot and comeback (2020–present) ===
In September 2019, The Hollywood Reporter announced that NBCUniversal's upcoming streaming service, Peacock was teaming with Berkley and Mario Lopez for a Saved by the Bell sequel series. Both actors were set to star and also produce the new show. Saved by the Bell, originally set for a summer release, faced several delays in production caused by the COVID-19 pandemic in the United States and wrapped filming in September 2020. On November 25, the day the show premiered, Berkley and Lopez, alongside Mark-Paul Gosselaar and Tiffani Thiessen appeared as guests on The Tonight Show Starring Jimmy Fallon. The show was renewed for a second season, released in November 2021, but despite the strong reviews and the Outstanding Comedy Series award won at the 33rd GLAAD Media Awards, it was cancelled in May 2022.

On November 22, 2021, Berkley joined Abel "The Weeknd" Tesfaye, Lily-Rose Depp, Suzanna Son, Steve Zissis, Anne Heche, Juliebeth Gonzalez and Troye Sivan in Sam Levinson's upcoming HBO series The Idol. Directed by Amy Seimetz, the show began production in Los Angeles in November. Berkley played a pivotal supporting role but on April 25, 2022, with roughly 80% of the series already filmed, Variety reported that the show was set to undergo a major overhaul, with "drastic" changes in the cast and creative directions. It was later announced that most of the main and supporting cast members, including Berkley, Heche, Gonzalez and Zissis were no longer part of the project, which was quickly re-written, re-cast and re-shot, with Levinson's taking over directing duties from Seimetz. The series was widely panned upon release and was canceled after one season in August 2023.

In 2024 Berkley returned to the big screen, playing the opening victim in Max Minghella's Shell, which premiered at the Toronto International Film Festival. The same year, she received three standing ovations when she introduced a sold-out, 35-mm special screening of Showgirls at the Academy Museum of Motion Pictures. During her speech, the actress acknowledged the importance of the queer audience: “I'm so grateful that the film has found its way not only in your hearts but especially the LGBTQ community. You stood by the film. You always believed”.

In June 2024, the producers of Cobra Kai (reportedly fans of Berkley from their childhood) offered her the role of Moon Taylor's mom Winnie, a character that had been referenced several times over the course of the seasons, but had never been shown. Berkley filmed her scenes on the final day of production for both Ralph Macchio and Courtney Henggeler in Atlanta. The show's co-lead William Zabka directed the episode.

In September 2024, she booked a guest starring role in Ryan Murphy's Hulu legal drama All's Fair.

== Ask-Elizabeth ==
In 2006, Berkley began facilitating small interactive self-esteem workshops with teen girls all around the United States. She would guide the group in order to create a safe space for the girls and let them open up about any problem they wanted to discuss, from body image issues, dating to goals and dreams. The first workshop was held in New York City but the program's popularity quickly grew. A non-profit organization was formed and a dedicated, interactive website was launched in 2007.

Ask-Elizabeth was also the working title of a reality series focusing on the program's success and its continued efforts to help girls throughout the country. Produced by MTV in collaboration with Berkley's newly created company 5–6–7–8 Productions, the show featured Berkley traveling around the US, examining issues and topics most important to teenaged girls. Amy Bailey, vice president of development in MTV's News and Documentaries division, said Berkley approached MTV with the idea. "She does these workshops around the country with teen girls and gets them to really open up about self-esteem and body issues", said Bailey. "We had been looking for a program that tackled the same issues, so it seemed like a perfect match." Originally expected to premiere in late 2008, the series never materialized.

However, in 2011, Berkley put together the 15 most frequently asked questions from the workshops and published Ask-Elizabeth through the Penguin Group. Designed by Berkley and her artist husband Greg Lauren to look like a personal diary, the book was a huge success and quickly became a New York Times Bestseller.

== Personal life ==
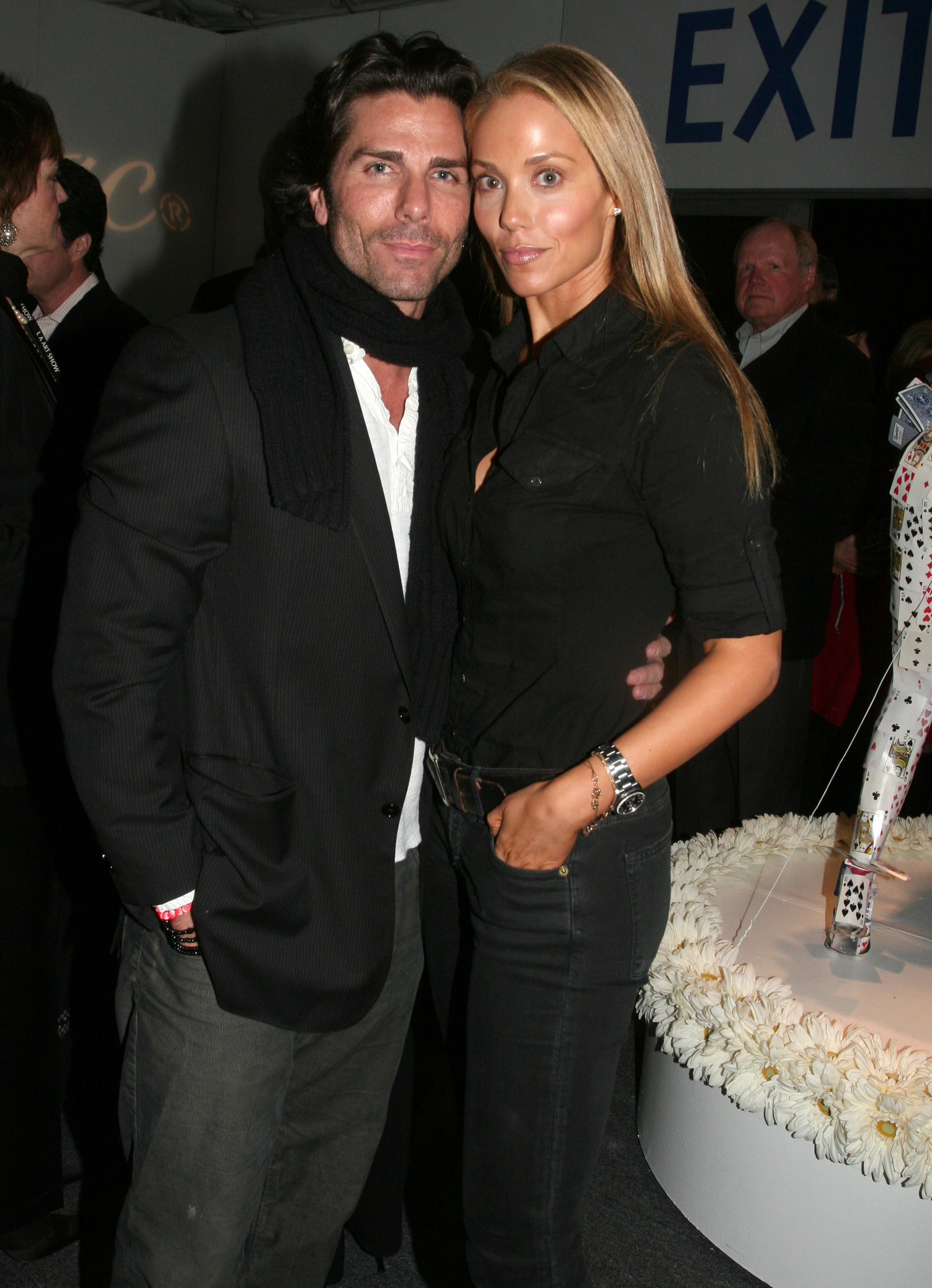
Berkley and her husband Greg Lauren at the 2008 Los Angeles Art Show

Berkley is married to former actor, artist and fashion designer Greg Lauren, nephew of Ralph Lauren and son of Jerry Lauren, at the time executive vice president of men's design at Polo Ralph Lauren. The couple met in 2000 during a dance class and were introduced by a mutual friend. They were engaged in 2002 and were married on November 1, 2003, at the Esperanza Hotel in Cabo San Lucas. Berkley's dress, a silk sheath with pearled spaghetti straps, was the first wedding gown designed by Ralph Lauren.

She formally changed her name to Elizabeth Berkley Lauren, and often uses it professionally. The couple welcomed a son in July 2012.

Berkley dated actor and screenwriter Roger Wilson from 1997 to 1999. She is good friends with actresses Ele Keats, Jennifer Beals and Carla Gugino.

Berkley is a vegetarian, and neither smokes nor drinks alcohol.

== Activism ==
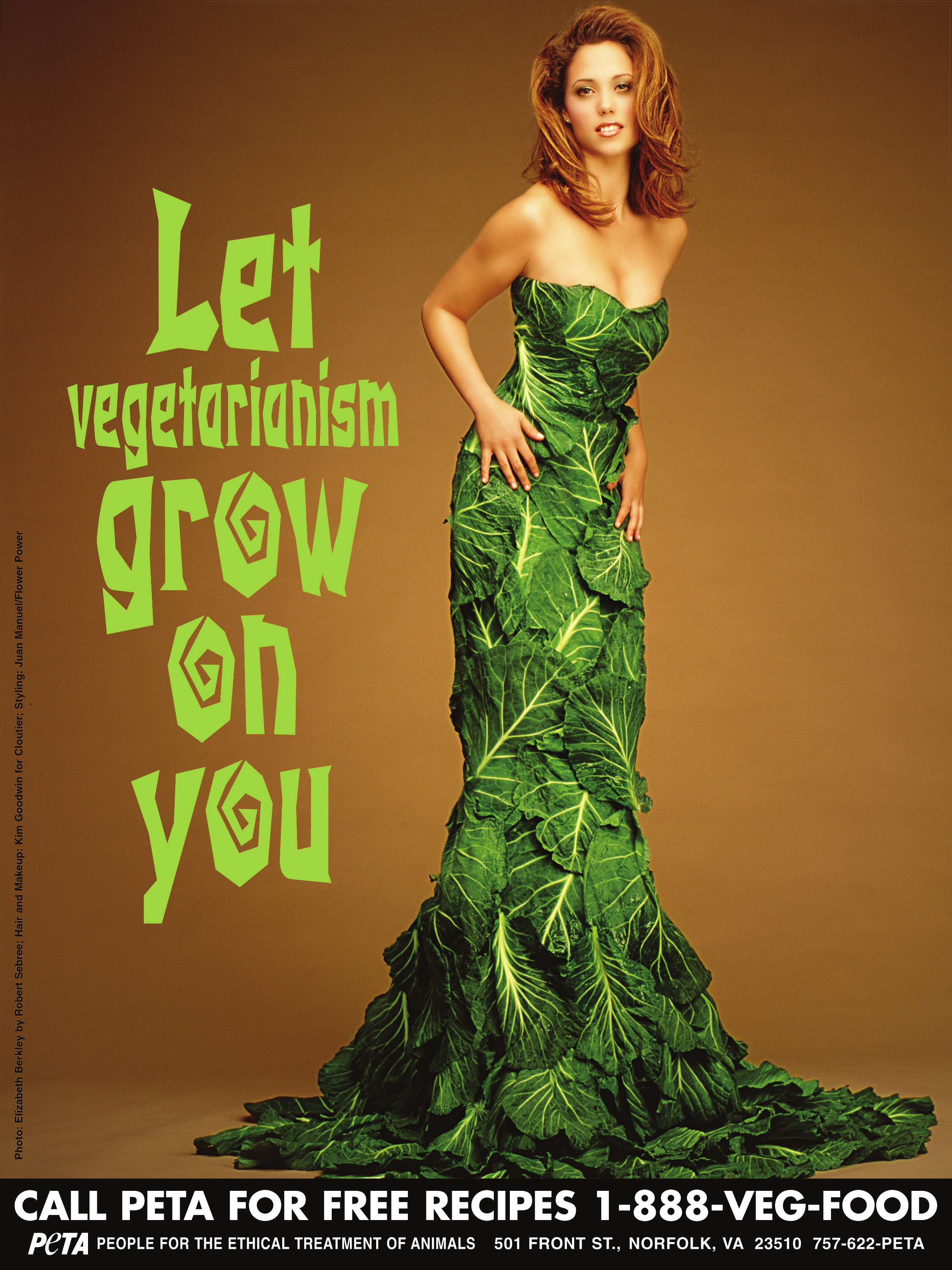
Berkley in an advertisement for PETA

Over the years, Berkley has been an active supporter of several organizations dedicated to environmental protection, the promotion of vegetarianism, and the health of younger and older people. According to the eighth annual Sesame Place Kids Poll conducted at Sesame Place (Philadelphia) in September 1993, Elizabeth was voted second-best public person to encourage recycling, partially due to the activism of her Saved by the Bell character Jessie Spano. Basketball superstar Michael Jordan outpolled her with 33% of votes (Elizabeth was favored by 22 percent). Next came Chelsea Clinton and Vice President Al Gore.

In 1997, she appeared in the Lettuce Be Lean campaign sponsored by People for the Ethical Treatment of Animals (PETA) to promote a larger range of vegetarian options in restaurants. For the campaign, she donned a $600 form-fitting gown made entirely of collard greens. She later took part in other charity events by the organization.

In May 1996, she was a guest model, along with Naomi Campbell, Janice Dickinson and other female celebrities, at Todd Oldham's LA Fashion Show. The event raised $600,000 for the AIDS Project Los Angeles.

In June 2009, she joined actress Thandiwe Newton in Henley on Klip, South Africa to lead workshops at Oprah Winfrey's Leadership Academy for Girls. At the time, she was also running a monthly column for teen girls in Oprah's website.

In October 2010, Berkley, along with Alec Baldwin, Slash, Nigel Barker, Bill Maher, Patrick McDonnell became supporters of the Shark-Free Marina Initiative to help combat sharks' disappearances from world's oceans. Sponsored by the Guy Harvey Ocean Foundation and the Humane Society of the United States, the initiative reached out marinas across the world asking them to get involved by prohibiting sharks from being landed at their dock.

== Filmography ==
=== Film ===
Year	Title	Role	Notes
1988	Platinum Blonde	–	Short film
1991	Point Break	Macrame Girl	Scene deleted
1994	Molly & Gina	Kimberly Sweeny	Direct to video
1995	Showgirls	Nomi Malone	
1996	The First Wives Club	Phoebe LaVelle	
1997	The Real Blonde	Tina	
1997	Armitage III: Poly-Matrix	Naomi Armitage (voice)	Animated film / direct to video
1999	Taxman	Nadia Rubakov	
1999	Last Call	Helena	
1999	Tail Lights Fade	Eve	
1999	Any Given Sunday	Mandy Murphy	
1999	Africa	Barbara Craig	
2001	The Curse of the Jade Scorpion	Jill	
2001	The Shipment	Candy Colucci	Direct to video
2002	Roger Dodger	Andrea	
2003	Detonator	Jane Dreyer	Direct to video
2003	Moving Malcolm	Liz Woodward	
2004	Meet Market	Linda	
2004	Cover Story	Samantha Noble	
2008	The Butler's in Love	Angelique	Short film
2009	Women in Trouble	Tracy	
2009	S. Darko	Trudy	Direct to video
2014	The Fashion Designer	The Fashion Designer	Short film (segment of The Blackout)
2024	Shell	Jenna Janero	

=== Television ===
Year	Title	Role	Notes
1986	Gimme a Break!	Kid	Episode: "Getting to Know You"
1986	Silver Spoons	Melissa	Episode: "Rick Moves Out"
1987	Frog	Kathy	Television film
1988	Day by Day	Lisabeth	Episode: "Girl Wars"
1989–93	Saved by the Bell	Jessica 'Jessie' Myrtle Spano	Main cast
1990	The Hogan Family	Ashley	Episode: "California Dreamin': Parts 1 & 2"
1990	Married People	Isabel	Episode: "Once More with Passion"
1990	Life Goes On	Selena	Episode: "La Dolce Becca"
1992	Raven	Deborah	Episode: "The Death of Sheila"
1992	Step by Step	Lisa Morgan	Episode: "J.T.'s World"
1992	Baywatch	Courtney Bremmer	Recurring cast (season 3)
1992	Saved by the Bell: Hawaiian Style	Jessie Spano	Television film
1993	Crossroads	Jen	Episode: "Paradise Found"
1994	Burke's Law	Heather Charles	Episode: "Who Killed the Beauty Queen?"
1994	Diagnosis: Murder	Shannon Thatcher	Episode: "Flashdance with Death"
1994	Bandit Goes Country	Beth	Television movie
1994	Saved by the Bell: Wedding in Las Vegas	Jessie Spano	Television movie
1996	White Wolves II: Legend of the Wild	Crystal	Television movie
1997	Perversions of Science	Ruth	Episode: "Planely Possible"
1998	Random Encounter	Alicia 'Allie' Brayman	Television film
1999	Brother's Keeper	Amy	Episode: "You Are Me"
2000	Jack & Jill	Gabi	Episode: "Under Pressure"
2000	NYPD Blue	Nicole Graf	Recurring cast (season 7)
2001	The Elevator	Celeste	Television film
2001–02	Titus	Shannon	Recurring cast (season 3)
2002	Cover Story	Samantha Noble	Television film
2002	The Twilight Zone	Marisa Sanborn	Episode: "Sanctuary"
2003	Control Factor	Karen Bishop	Television film
2003	Student Seduction	Christie Dawson	Television film
2003	CSI: Crime Scene Investigation	Renée, Foam Dancer	Episode: "Lady Heather's Box"
2004	Without a Trace	Post-Makeover Lynette Shaw	Episode: "American Goddess"
2005	Threshold	Christine Polchek	Episode: "Progeny"
2006	Law & Order: Criminal Intent	Danielle Quinn	Episode: "Dollhouse"
2007	Black Widow	Olivia Whitfield/Grace Miller	Television film
2008	Step It Up and Dance	Herself/Host	Main Host
2008–09	CSI: Miami	Julia Winston	Recurring cast (season 6–7)
2009	The L Word	Kelly Wentworth	Recurring cast (season 6)
2011	Lucky Christmas	Holly Ceroni	Television film
2013	Dancing with the Stars	Herself/Contestant	Main contestant (season 17)
2014	Melissa & Joey	Dr. Kathryn Miller	Episode: "Couples Therapy"
2015
2015	The Tonight Show Starring Jimmy Fallon	Jessie Spano	Episode: "Episode #2.91"
2016	New Girl	Becky Cavatappi	Episode: "The Apartment"
2020–21	Saved by the Bell	Jessie Spano	Main cast
2023	The Idol	–	Recurring role / original, unreleased version
2025	Cobra Kai	Winnie Taylor	Episode: "Rattled"
2025	All's Fair	Deandre Barber	Episode: "When We Were Young"

== Awards and nominations ==
Year	Award	Category	Work	Result
1990	Young Artist Awards	Outstanding Young Ensemble Cast	Saved by the Bell	Nominated
1992	Young Artist Awards	Best Young Actress in an Off-Primetime Series or Cable Series	Saved by the Bell	Nominated
1992	Young Artist Awards	Outstanding Young Ensemble Cast in a television series	Saved by the Bell	Nominated
1993	Young Artist Awards	Best Young Actress in an Off-Primetime Series	Saved by the Bell	Nominated
1995	Stinkers Bad Movie Awards	Worst Actress	Showgirls	Nominated
1995	Golden Raspberry Awards	Worst Actress	Showgirls	Won
1995	Golden Raspberry Awards	Worst New Star	Showgirls	Won
1995	National Board of Review	Best Acting by an Ensemble	The First Wives Club	Won
1999	Golden Raspberry Awards	Worst Actress of the Century	Showgirls	Nominated
1999	Golden Raspberry Awards	Worst New Star of the Decade	Showgirls	Nominated

Awards and achievements
Preceded by Stephen Baldwin, Gabriel Byrne, Benicio del Toro, Kevin Pollak, Kevin Spacey, Chazz Palminteri, Pete Postlethwaite, Suzy Amis, Giancarlo Esposito for The Usual Suspects	National Board of Review Award for Best Acting by an Ensemble; Shared with Bette Midler, Goldie Hawn, Diane Keaton, Maggie Smith, Dan Hedaya, Sarah Jessica Parker, Stockard Channing, Victor Garber, Stephen Collins, Marcia Gay Harden, Bronson Pinchot, Jennifer Dundas, Eileen Heckart, Philip Bosco, Rob Reiner, James Naughton, Ari Greenberg, Aida Linares for The First Wives Club; 1996	Succeeded by Ian Holm, Caerthan Banks, Sarah Polley, Tom McCamus, Gabrielle Rose, Alberta Watson, Maury Chaykin, Stephanie Morgenstern for The Sweet Hereafter
