= James Shavick =

Canadian film and television producer (born 1950)

- Born: 1950 (age 75–76); Montreal, Quebec, Canada
- Occupation: Film/television producer
- Spouse: Joy MacPhail

James Shavick (born 1950) is a Canadian film and television producer, currently the CEO of Shavick Entertainment.

His films include Two of Hearts and Two Solitudes, while his television series have included The New Addams Family and Breaker High.

== Personal life ==
He was born in Montreal to Lenard Shavick, a former president of Holt Renfrew.

He is married to Joy MacPhail, a partner in Shavick Entertainment and a former leader of the British Columbia New Democratic Party.

== Honours ==
He was awarded an honorary doctorate from Capilano University in 2015 and also from Concordia University in June 2016.
