= Mark Stock =

American painter

Mark Stock (August 4, 1951 – March 26, 2014) was an American painter. He was born in Frankfurt, Germany, in 1951. The son of an Army officer, Stock lived in many states across America before settling in St. Petersburg, Florida. He received his Bachelor of Arts degree from the University of South Florida in Tampa, where he studied under Theo Wujcik. Upon graduating in 1976, Stock was hired to work at Gemini G.E.L. in Los Angeles as a lithographer. While there, he printed for notable artists such as Jasper Johns, David Hockney, Robert Rauschenberg, and Roy Lichtenstein before leaving to paint full-time.

== Ballet and modern dance ==
In 1977, Stock began studying ballet and modern dance. His work expanded to include designing sets for various Los Angeles-based dance companies. He started to paint the figure in 1983 and has become widely known for his narrative paintings.

== Paintings ==
Stock's works can be found in the permanent collections of Brooklyn Museum, Museum of Modern Art (New York and San Francisco), The Library of Congress and The National Gallery of Art. His paintings were prominently featured as part of the storyline in the erotic thriller Fleshtone (1994).

== Musician ==
Besides painting, Mark Stock was a jazz drummer whose trio performed regularly. He was also an accomplished magician and a champion golfer. He resided in Oakland, California.

== Magician ==
An avid amateur magician, Stock was known for performing his floating dollar bill trick.

== Death ==
On March 26, 2014, Stock died due to an enlarged heart at Alta Bates Summit Medical Center in Oakland, California; He was 62 years old.

Stock's final resting place is at the Mountain View Cemetery in Altadena, California. His tombstone depicts an image that he drew in 1977 of a tombstone in a wagon.
