= The Addams Family (1973 TV series) =

- Genre: Animated sitcom; Comedy horror
- Created by: Charles Addams
- Developed by: David Levy
- Directed by: Charles A. Nichols
- Voices of: Ted Cassidy; Jackie Coogan; Jodie Foster; Cindy Henderson; John Stephenson; Janet Waldo; Lennie Weinrib
- Country of origin: United States
- Original language: English
- No. of seasons: 1
- No. of episodes: 16

Production
- Executive producers: William Hanna; Joseph Barbera
- Producer: Iwao Takamoto
- Running time: 30 min.
- Production company: Hanna-Barbera Productions

Original release
- Network: NBC
- Release: September 8 – December 22, 1973

Related
- The Addams Family; Halloween with the New Addams Family; The New Scooby-Doo Movies

The Addams Family is an American animated sitcom adaptation of the Charles Addams single-panel comic for The New Yorker. The show was produced by Hanna-Barbera Productions for Saturday mornings in 1973, and was later rebroadcast the following season. Jackie Coogan and Ted Cassidy, who played Uncle Fester and Lurch, respectively, in the 1960s television series, returned in voice-over roles. The cast also included 10-year-old Jodie Foster, who performed the voice of Pugsley Addams. The show's theme music was completely different and had no lyrics or finger snapping, but retained a recognizable part of the four-note score from the live-action series.

== Plot ==
The Addams Family consists of husband and wife Gomez and Morticia Addams, their children Wednesday and Pugsley, as well as Grandmama, Uncle Fester, Thing, Cousin Itt, and their butler, Lurch. The Addamses are a close-knit extended family with decidedly macabre interests and supernatural abilities. No explanation for their powers is explicitly given in the series.

This series depicts the Addamses on a cross-country road trip, exploring the United States in their Victorian-style creepy camper that resembles their mansion. Along the way, they stop off at various locations and venues. They inadvertently cause mayhem wherever they go due to their unusual interests and mannerisms, their willingness to trust those who probably shouldn't be trusted (although they do occasionally aid others who genuinely need help), and their getting swept up in criminal schemes or problems without their knowledge.

== Voice cast ==
- Lennie Weinrib – Gomez
- Janet Waldo – Morticia, Grandmama
- Jackie Coogan – Uncle Fester
- Cindy Henderson – Wednesday
- Jodie Foster – Pugsley
- Ted Cassidy – Lurch
- John Stephenson – Cousin Itt

== Development ==
=== Scooby-Doo appearance ===
The Addams Family's first animated appearance was on the third episode of Hanna-Barbera's The New Scooby-Doo Movies, "Scooby-Doo Meets the Addams Family" (a.k.a. "Wednesday is Missing"), which first aired on CBS Saturday morning on September 23, 1972. John Astin, Carolyn Jones, Jackie Coogan, and Ted Cassidy provided the voices for their respective Addams Family characters while voice actors were used to voice Grandmama, Wednesday, Pugsley, and Cousin Itt. The episode details the Addams Family in a mystery with the Scooby-Doo gang. The Addams Family characters were drawn to the specifications of the original Charles Addams comics.

=== The Addams Family gets its own cartoon ===
The first animated series ran on Saturday mornings from 1973 to 1975 on NBC. In a departure from the original series, this series took the Addamses on the road in a Victorian-style recreational vehicle (RV) that resembles their house. This series followed the relationships of the original Addams comics in that Fester is Gomez's brother, and Grandmama is Morticia's mother. Many cast members from the original series and the Scooby-Doo episode reprise their roles in the series, with the exceptions of John Astin and Carolyn Jones whose characters were voiced by Lennie Weinrib and Janet Waldo. Ted Cassidy was a frequent voice actor for Hanna-Barbera television productions at the time, and had previously voiced Lurch for New Scooby Doo Movies. The show also introduces the Addams Family's animal companions Ali the alligator, Ocho the octopus and Mr. V the vulture, who are often seen with their fellow pet Kitty Kat the lion.

== Episodes ==
No.	Title	Original release date
1	"The Addams Family in New York"	September 8, 1973
The Addams Family are offered a bargain: New York City's Central Park. To help them clean it up, they free animals from the zoo, but the police come and the Addamses are about to be arrested when Gomez produces unexpected proof that he is in fact the rightful owner of Central Park. The park was bequeathed to an ancestor, Van Dyke Addams, and a deed confirms that it is to be passed on to his heirs. But the cops still have a hard time with Gomez's story.
2	"Left in the Lurch"	September 15, 1973
The Addams Family goes to Nashville in search of dinosaur bones, but find themselves caught up in a rock festival instead. Lurch is anxious about meeting his pen pal. He becomes a lead guitarist and vocalist for the group Freddy and the Frogs.
3	"Boola Boola"	September 22, 1973
The rare Boola-Boola is said to be found in the Black Lake and the Addams Family have an exciting time when they join in on the search. But they have more to look for than the Boola-Boola when Ocho the octopus is kidnapped.
4	"The Fastest Creepy Camper in the West"	September 29, 1973
In Indianapolis, petroleum shortage promises to be a thing of the past via Uncle Fester's new invention — "Festerine" — but the Addamses are caught up outwitting Count Evil and the Race Ace. When they succeed at this task, they win a million dollars for Gomez's favorite charity: Vulture Culture at The Ghoul School at Dracula University.
5	"The Mardi Gras Story"	October 6, 1973
The Addams Family enjoy all the fun and gaiety of Mardi Gras in New Orleans, but it is difficult to recognize them in their funny masks. Tensions mount when a couple of crooks masquerade as Fester and Gomez.
6	"Follow That Loaf of Bread"	October 13, 1973
Thing finds himself in trouble when Morticia is baking Eerie Egg Bread and he falls into the mixture. The loaves of bread win the national bake-off contest in Chicago before the Addamses figure out what is going on. Then, they embark on a desperate search for the loaf of bread containing Thing.
7	"Aloha, Hoolamagoola"	October 20, 1973
The Addams Family experience an exciting Hawaiian adventure in which they are mistaken for a Stone Age tribe: the lost Hoolamagoola. Also, Ocho the octopus discovers an underwater cave.
8	"The Reluctant Astronauts' Trip to the Moon"	October 27, 1973
The Addams Family arrives at Cape Kennedy and receive a trip to the moon from two crooks. Preparations arise for a visit to inspect their new possession, and their rocket blasts off with a little help from Uncle Fester. Then comes the problem of trying to find a place to land.
9	"The Great Balloon Race"	November 3, 1973
A balloon race is attracting a lot of attention, but Professor Orville Byrd's balloon is sabotaged during its entire route from New York City to Los Angeles by the Nasty Brothers. The Addams Family decide to lend a helping hand to the imperiled professor.
10	"Ghost Town"	November 10, 1973
Spooks are scaring everyone away from the Old Prospector's land and they try to scare off the Addams Family as well when they arrive, to no avail. The spooks manage to scare Wednesday and Pugsley but the Addamses' pets manage to scare the spooks.
11	"The Circus Story"	November 17, 1973
The Addams Family visit a circus which they discover is "The Worst Show On Earth". They decide to help when Honest John tells them of its troubles with a rival circus stealing its workers.
12	"The Addams Family at Sea"	November 24, 1973
The Addams Family take their first ocean voyage, but the sight of Ali the alligator and Ocho the octopus dancing has every passenger aboard spooked; so much so that they jump overboard. The crooks Lefty and Joe promptly steal all the valuables aboard as a result, but the Addamses are soon in hot pursuit of the thieves as they attempt a getaway in a speedboat.
13	"The Voodoo Story"	December 1, 1973
Madame Hoodoo finds all her curses and spells fail miserably to frighten the Addams Family and things digress from bad to worse for her when her love potion backfires and Granny puts a blessing on her. She decides to go back to Haiti for advanced voodoo lessons.
14	"The Roller Derby Story"	December 8, 1973
Wednesday Addams chooses to visit the Roller Derby for her thirteenth birthday celebration, and the Addams Family are soon involved between the bitter rivalry of the Angels and the Demons, resulting in the Addams Family playing for the Angels.
15	"The Addams Family Goes West"	December 15, 1973
Following the trail of the great pioneers, the Addams Family goes to the wide open spaces of the West and find themselves outsmarting such characters as Wyatt Burp, Silly the Kid, Wild Bill Hiccup and Badmouth Ben.
16	"The Addams Family at the Kentucky Derby"	December 22, 1973
Pugsley Addams wants a horse for his birthday celebration, so the Addams Family go to Kentucky to buy one. They choose a worn-out old nag named Bones, but Granny's cooking does him so much good that he becomes a fast runner again and is ridden by Pugsley to victory at the Kentucky Derby. So in the end, after sacrificing their good name, the Addamses sadly give Bones back to the Kellys, as he is now a winner, leaving Pugsley disappointed and heartbroken.

=== Public service announcements ===
Concurrently with their series, the animated Addams characters appeared in public service announcements for the Boy Scouts of America (featuring Pugsley as a Scout), the four nutritious food groups then promoted by the USDA, and forest fire prevention for the United States Forest Service.

== Broadcast history ==
Telecast: NBC Saturday Morning September 8, 1973 – August 30, 1975

Sept. – Dec. 1973, NBC Saturday 9:00–9:30 AM (EDT)
Jan. – Aug. 1974, NBC Saturday 8:30–9:00 AM (EDT)
Sept. 1974 – Aug. 1975, NBC Saturday 8:00–8:30 AM (EDT)

Beginning in 2024, the show debuted on MeTV Toons; after initially airing seasonally during the network's Spooktacular Sunday lineup during the 2024 and 2025 Halloween seasons, it would join the lineup full-time on September 27, 2026.

== Home media ==
In 1991 at least 2 VHS tapes with 4 episodes each were released.

In October 2010, Warner Archive released the complete series on DVD.

== Comic book series ==
From October 1974 to April 1975, Gold Key Comics produced a comic book series in connection with the show, but it only lasted three issues. Each issue was adapted from a TV episode, starting with "In Search of the Boola-Boola" (October 1974).

== See also ==
- The Addams Family (1992 animated series)
