= Lurch (The Addams Family) =

Character in The Addams Family

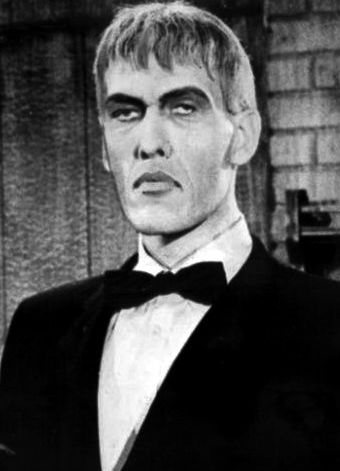
- Ted Cassidy as Lurch
- First appearance: The New Yorker (1938)
- Created by: Charles Addams
- Portrayed by: Ted Cassidy (1964–1966, 1977); Carel Struycken (1991–1998); John DeSantis (1998–1999); Zachary James (2011); George Burcea (2022); Joonas Suotamo (2025)
- Voiced by: Ted Cassidy (1972); Jim Cummings (1992–1993); Conrad Vernon (2019, 2021)

In-universe information
- Species: Human
- Gender: Male
- Occupation: Butler; Chauffeur; Cook
- Nationality: American

Lurch (whose full name is unknown) is a fictional character created by American cartoonist Charles Addams as a butler to the Addams Family. In the original television series, Lurch was played by Ted Cassidy.

== Cartoons ==
In Charles Addams's original cartoons, Lurch is often seen accompanying the rest of the family, sometimes carrying a feather duster. In a couple of illustrations, the Family is seen decorating Lurch as they would a Christmas tree.

== Characterization ==
Lurch is a tall, shambling, gloomy butler. In the original Addams Family television series, Lurch has a deep and resonant voice. Although fully capable of normal speech, Lurch often communicates via simple inarticulate moans, which, much like the dialogue of Cousin Itt, his employers have no trouble understanding. In the book The Addams Family: An Evilution, Charles Addams states:

This towering mute has been shambling around the house forever. He is not a very good butler, but a faithful one. He is often sent on local errands to pick the awful herbs from the garden, for instance, but will often forget the most important ingredient of all, say Eye of Newt. He is shamefaced about his oversight and the object of good-natured ridicule from the family. The children are his favorites and [he] guards them against good influences at all times. One eye is opaque; the scanty hair is damply clinging to his narrow, flat head. He will gladly undertake to dump the boiling oil on the carol singers, but, generally, the family treats him as something of a joke.

Like any butler, Lurch tries to help around the house, but occasionally his great size and strength cause trouble. He clearly takes pride in his work and is willing to do even the most arduous task. In the ending of "Lurch's Little Helper" while patting a crowbar meaningfully, he declares that his putative robot helper (portrayed by Robby the Robot) has "Retired."

His character often demonstrates signs of frustration towards his employers; however, his continued presence also suggests loyalty. As a result, he appears to be one of the family.

The family summons him with an ever-present bell pull (in the form of a hangman's noose). When pulled, it produces a loud gong noise that shakes the house, to which Lurch instantly appears and responds, "You... rang?", even if wide-angle shots reveal that he was clearly nowhere in the vicinity before; on a few occasions Lurch arrives even before the bell pull is tugged.

Lurch largely shares the family's macabre standards, although he occasionally looks disapproving or suspicious of some of their activities. He has a similar attitude toward visitors – almost a sixth sense. When a plainclothes police officer named Mr. Hollister (portrayed by George N. Neise) visits in "The Addams Family Meets the Undercover Man", Lurch pats him down and removes his service revolver from inside his suit coat. Although Lurch groans disapprovingly at the idea of someone bringing a weapon into the house, he returns the gun after Hollister shows his badge.

Different adaptions had Lurch also working as a chauffeur and a cook.

== Backstory ==
Much of Lurch's history, including his first name and the nature of his relationship to any other Addamses, was originally unspecified. "Lurch" was revealed during the original TV series to be a surname, as there was a "Mother Lurch" who appeared in one episode (portrayed by Ellen Corby). She addressed Lurch as "Sonny", which could either be a parental nickname or his actual first name.

As for his father, he was mentioned twice, once in the second animated series. In an apparent reference to his similar appearance to Frankenstein's monster, Lurch said smiling "He put me together" as his picture shows him as a blue-skinned scientist with a similar appearance. Another time in the original series, Lurch mentions his father wanted him to be a jockey (typically short and light people) instead of a butler.

It was stated in Addams Family Reunion that Lurch is "part Addams," playing into his being a creation similar to Frankenstein's monster. The only definite body part that is from an Addams is his heart. Lurch's mother appears to be a physically normal, elderly woman, although she does not see anything unusual about the Addams family or their home, with the exception of Thing.

In The New Addams Family episode "Morticia and the Lady's League", a woman comments to Morticia about Lurch by asking "Where did you dig him up?" Morticia responds by stating "Funny, I can't remember which cemetery it was". Lurch is also referenced as having "two left feet" which, in the context of the series, could be taken literally or as a reference to his apparent inability to dance (though he tries in the original series).

In the 2019 animated film, Lurch was an escaped mental patient from an abandoned haunted house (now, the Addams Mansion) and met Gomez, Morticia, and Thing whereupon they immediately hired him as their loyal butler.

== Influence ==
On October 30, 1965, a song and dance based on Lurch, entitled "The Lurch", were introduced on the ABC music program Shindig!. This mirrored an earlier episode of the Addams Family television series, entitled "Lurch, the Teenage Idol" (which was remade in 1999 for The New Addams Family). In it, Lurch records a song on his harpsichord and becomes a pop sensation. In real life, actor Ted Cassidy released a single of "The Lurch" and performed it on the Shindig! episode in character as Lurch (in the same instalment, Cassidy, out of character this time, also performed a ballad).

During the 2018–2019 NBA season, analyst and former player Shaquille O'Neal began using Lurch's catchphrase "You rang?" to refer to Philadelphia 76ers backup center Boban Marjanovic, due to a perceived physical resemblance between Marjanovic and Lurch.

== Adaptations ==
=== Live-action TV series ===
Lurch appears in The Addams Family, portrayed by Ted Cassidy. He is physically imposing and plays a harpsichord that was originally in Cousin Crimp's family for 400 years.

Cassidy made a cameo appearance as Lurch in the Batman episode "The Penguin's Nest". As Batman and Robin are climbing the wall of Penguin's restaurant, the Addams Family theme is heard in the background. Lurch pops his head out of the window, sees Batman and Robin, and comments that they gave him quite a start. Batman tells Lurch that he can return to his harpsichord as Robin states that they are on official business.

Lurch appears in The New Addams Family portrayed by John DeSantis.

In the 2022 series Wednesday, Lurch appears briefly and is performed by Romanian actor George Burcea in season one and by Joonas Suotamo in season two. Additionally, the line "you rang?" is referenced by Tyler when Wednesday rings a bell to summon him at the coffee shop. Lurch drove the Addams Family to Nevermore Academy upon Wednesday being enrolled there. He was also present during Parents' Day. Following the death of Headmistress Larissa Weems and the arrest of Laurel Gates, Lurch helped Wednesday pack when Nevermore Academy is shut down for the rest of the semester. In season two, Lurch was with the Addams Family when Weems' successor Barry Dort persuades Morticia and Gomez to linger around to help with Nevermore Academy's fundraiser.

=== Animated TV series ===
Ted Cassidy, who at the time was a regular voice actor for Hanna-Barbera Productions, reprised his role of Lurch in 1972 for HB's The New Scooby-Doo Movies episode "Wednesday Is Missing". He is the one who finds Mystery Inc.'s Mystery Machine stuck in the mud outside the Addams Family house and takes them inside where Gomez and Morticia hire them to be the housekeepers while they are away at the Okefenokee Swamp. By the end of the episode, Lurch helps the Mystery Machine out of the mud.

Ted Cassidy later reprised his role of Lurch in the 1973 cartoon adaptation of The Addams Family, which was also produced by Hanna-Barbera.

Lurch appears in the 1990s adaptation of The Addams Family voiced by Jim Cummings. In this version, he is shown to have blue skin. The episode "Girlfriendstein" gives Lurch's shoe size as 27QQQQ.

=== Films ===
Carel Struycken as Lurch in The Addams Family film (1991).

Lurch appears in the 1991 film adaptation of The Addams Family portrayed by Carel Struycken. He never speaks audibly, but groans recurrently. He is seen assisting Morticia by going through the wardrobe of the late Uncle Knick-Knack. Lurch was present when loan shark Abigail Craven brings her son Gordon disguised as the long-lost Uncle Fester to the Addams Family mansion. When Tully Alford persuades Judge George Womack to grant the ownership of the house to Uncle Fester and have a restraining order that causes the rest of the family to be evicted, Lurch joins the rest of the family in moving in to a hotel. Seven months later after Craven and Alford are defeated, Lurch answers the door on Halloween where he unintentionally scares away the trick or treaters. At the end of the film, he joins the Addams Family in playing "Wake the Dead" where they work to awaken the zombies of the dead relatives.

Lurch appears in the sequel Addams Family Values portrayed again by Struycken. He was present at the hospital when Morticia gives birth to Pubert Addams. In one of Wednesday and Pugsley's plots to dispose of Pubert, they drop him and a cannonball off the roof where Pubert falls into Gomez' arms and the cannonball hits Lurch on the head while he was doing some spraying outside, which did not faze him. When Debbie Jellinsky plans to kill the family, Lurch was among those strapped to the electric chair. At the end of the movie, Lurch plays "Happy Birthday" on the harpsichord for Pubert's first birthday party.

Lurch appears in Addams Family Reunion portrayed again by Struycken, who was the only cast member from the first two films to return for the third.

Lurch appears in the animated film adaptation of The Addams Family (2019), voiced by Conrad Vernon. This version is a patient from the abandoned State Asylum for the Criminally Insane who Gomez, Morticia, and Thing hit with their car after relocating to New Jersey. As Lurch recovers, Gomez and Morticia take him in as their butler. The abandoned asylum becomes the Addams Family's home. Lurch sings "Everybody Hurts" with the singing voice provided by Fuzz Finnegan.

Lurch appears in The Addams Family 2 portrayed again by Vernon while his singing voice was provided by Dominic Lewis. He accompanies the Addams Family on a road trip while Grandmama keeps an eye on the house. Lurch later finds out that Wednesday is planning to meet with Cyrus Strange after Cyrus' lawyer Mr. Mustela claims that Wednesday is Cyrus' daughter. He and Wednesday were able to get a ride to Cyrus' house with help from some bikers who were impressed with Lurch's performance of Gloria Gaynor's "I Will Survive". During the conflict with Cyrus Strange, it is revealed that Lurch knew Cyrus and Mustela's minion Pongo who was also in the same asylum with Lurch. Thanks to some gestures from Lurch, Pongo is persuaded to turn against Cyrus. After Cyrus was defeated, Lurch returns home with the Addams Family as Gomez makes plans for a trip around the world.

=== Musical ===
Lurch appears in the stage musical adaptation of The Addams Family portrayed by Zachary James in the original Broadway production, Tom Corbeil in the US National Tour production, and Laughlin Grace in other tour productions. He is present during a gathering of the Addams Family and their relatives. Lurch later ushers the Beinekes into the Addams Family mansion. By the end of the musical, Lurch surprises everyone by singing out loud for the first time.

== Portrayals of Lurch ==
Live-action adaptations
Actor	Source	Medium
Ted Cassidy	The Addams Family (1964-1966)	Television
Carel Struycken	The Addams Family (1991)	Film
John DeSantis	The New Addams Family (1998)	Television
Zachary James	The Addams Family (2010)	Broadway production
George Burcea	Wednesday (2022, Season 1)	Television
Joonas Suotamo	Wednesday (2025, Season 2)	Television
