= Jerry Butler (actor) =

American pornographic film actor (1959–2018)

- Born: Paul David Siederman; May 13, 1959; Brooklyn, New York, U.S.
- Died: January 27, 2018 (aged 58); Brooklyn, New York, U.S.
- Other names: Paul David Seiderman; Arthur West; Jerry Rillios
- Occupation: Pornographic film actor
- Height: 6 ft 0 in (1.83 m)
- Spouse: Lisa Loring (m. 1987; div. 1992)

Jerry Butler (born Paul David Siederman; May 13, 1959 – January 27, 2018) was an American pornographic film actor. His career lasted from 1981 to 1993, and included more than 500 films.

== Biography ==
Butler was born Paul David Siederman in Brooklyn to a Jewish father and a mother of half German/Irish and half Cherokee descent. His paternal grandfather, Sam Siederman, was reportedly the half-brother of Russian communist leader Leon Trotsky.

Butler initially tried his luck at mainstream acting, performing in a variety of off-Broadway plays. He also had a few walk-on appearances on the soap opera One Life to Live in 1978 and made an uncredited appearance in Frank Henenlotter's 1982 horror film Basket Case. He was generally unhappy with the constant pressure to sleep with men in exchange for parts, and began to slowly grow tired of the wasted effort.

He first got into hardcore pornography in 1981, after answering an advertisement in Backstage Magazine looking for hardcore actors. He auditioned for a non-sex role and, after a little persuading, ended up with a hardcore sex role in the 1981 film Young, Wild and Wonderful.

His stage name was inspired by the Jerry Butler song "Only the Strong Survive." Butler was touted as the most talented male actor in his day, with turns in Chuck Vincent's bigger budget adult efforts Roommates (1981) and In Love (1983), the latter winning him Hustler's "Best Actor Award".

During his adult film career, Butler made appearances in three more mainstream films, playing a comedic role in Preppies (1984), the dramatic lead in psychological thriller Deranged (1987), which were both directed by Chuck Vincent, and in the horror film Evils of the Night (1985).

According to the Internet Adult Film Database, Butler acted in 656 adult films during his lifetime.

== Personal life ==
In 1987, Butler married former child actress Lisa Loring, who was best known for playing Wednesday Addams on The Addams Family television show in the 1960s. They met on the set of the adult film Traci's Big Trick (1987), where Loring was working as a make-up artist.

In an interview with NBC's Dateline in the 1990s Butler described himself as "addicted to the lifestyle", ashamed of his clandestine behavior and its effect on his marriage. The couple later appeared on the Sally Jessy Raphael Show, again discussing the damage Butler's porn career was causing to their marriage. Butler and Loring divorced in 1992.

Butler released an autobiography in 1989, as told to Robert Rimmer and Catherine Tavel, called Raw Talent. The book gave an insider's account of the porn industry. He was forthcoming in the book, giving very intimate details of some of his co-workers in the business, and citing the existence of widespread drug abuse in the industry.

Butler re-surfaced in 2003 in a non-sex role in a porn film titled Sexy Sluts: Been There, Done That, released that year, which was directed by underground rapper Necro. Butler was also a featured guest on Necro's album The Sexorcist (2005).

=== Illness and death ===
Butler was diagnosed with a tumor which was removed in an operation, but a subsequent check-up following a cycling accident revealed the cancer had spread throughout his body and was inoperable. On January 27, 2018, he died in Brooklyn, New York, at the age of 58.

== Awards ==
- 1985 AFAA Best Actor for Snake Eyes
- 1985 X-Rated Critics Organization (XRCO) Best Actor for Snake Eyes
- AVN Hall of Fame

== Filmography (non-pornographic) ==
- Basket Case (1982, uncredited) as Casey Greeter No. 1
- Preppies (1984, as Paul Sutton) as Dick Foster
- Evils of the Night (1985, as Paul Siederman) as Eddie
- Deranged (1987, as Paul Siederman) as Frank
- Electric Blue 53 (1987) as Dr. Lamarr

== Television ==
- One Life to Live — Multiple uncredited appearances, 1978
- The Morton Downey Jr. Show — playing "Himself", September 1988
- Frontline — playing "Himself" in episode: "Death of a Porn Queen", 1987
- The Sally Jessy Raphael Show — interviewed alongside his then-wife Lisa Loring, 1989
- The Joan Rivers Show — January 16, 1990
- Geraldo — interviewed alongside his then-wife Lisa Loring, 1992
