= Halloween with the New Addams Family =

1977 television film

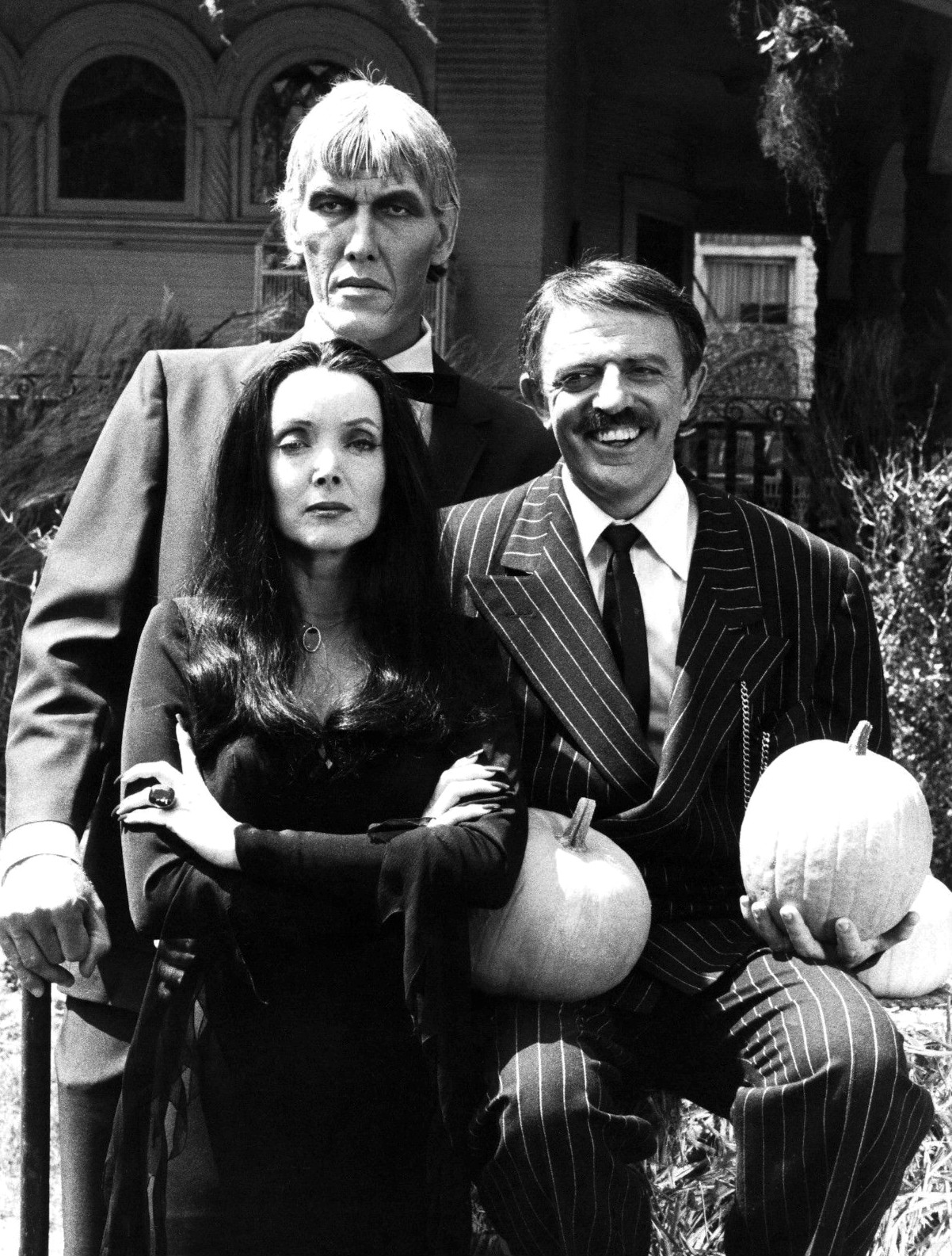
- Ted Cassidy, Carolyn Jones and John Astin in a publicity photo for the special.
- Genre: Halloween television movie
- Written by: Charles Addams (characters; uncredited); George Tibbles
- Directed by: Dennis Steinmetz
- Starring: Carolyn Jones; John Astin; Ted Cassidy; Jackie Coogan; Henry Darrow; Jane Rose; Ken Weatherwax; Elvia Allman
- Theme music composer: Vic Mizzy
- Country of origin: United States
- Original language: English

Production
- Executive producer: Charles W. Fries
- Producer: David Levy
- Cinematography: Jacques R. Marquette
- Editor: Ken Baker
- Running time: 74 minutes
- Production company: Charles Fries Productions

Original release
- Network: NBC
- Release: October 30, 1977

Related
- The Addams Family (1973 series); The Addams Family (1992 series)

Halloween with the New Addams Family is a 1977 American made-for-television comedy horror film based on the 1964–1966 sitcom The Addams Family. The film premiered on NBC on October 30, 1977. In contrast to the "new" in the title, most of the original series regulars reprised their roles, including John Astin, Carolyn Jones (billed as a "special guest star"), Jackie Coogan, Ted Cassidy, Lisa Loring, Ken Weatherwax and Felix Silla. Eleven years after the cancellation of the 1960s TV series, it was the only presentation that brought together most of the original cast in a color production, shot on videotape.

== Plot ==
Gomez's brother Pancho is staying with the family while Gomez must travel to Tombstone, Arizona. While Gomez believes he is traveling to a lodge convention, in reality he has been lured off by crooks who have bugged the house in order to steal the family fortune. Halloween is nigh and Pancho tells the legend of Cousin Shy, who distributes gifts and carves pumpkins.

The lead crook "Bones" Lafferty sends henchman Mikey to investigate the home. Wednesday (Senior) is home from music academy, where she studies the piccolo, which she uses to break glass with. Pugsley (Senior) is home from Nairobi medical school, where he is training to be a witch doctor. Mikey panics and flees after treading on Kitty Kat's (the family's pet lion) tail.

The crooks enlist doppelgangers of Gomez and Morticia to further their plans, along with two strong-arm goons, Hercules and Atlas. Gomez returns home for the Halloween party and trimming of the scarecrow.

Lafferty poses as Quincy Addams (from Boston) to get in. He has his men tie up Gomez and Morticia and his doubles take their places, confusing Pancho, who's still infatuated with Morticia.

While Lurch scares off the thugs, Fester puts Lafferty on the rack, in an attempt to "be nice". Lafferty tries to escape through a secret passage, but comes faces to face with Kitty Kat's tail, resulting in him fleeing.

Shortly after, the police arrive at the house, responding to a noise complaint. Upon their arrival, Lafferty and his gang surrender.

The Addams family are then free to celebrate Halloween happily, ending the night by singing together in welcome for Cousin Shy.

== Cast ==
- Carolyn Jones as Morticia Addams / Ophelia Frump
- John Astin as Gomez Addams
- Ted Cassidy as Lurch
- Jackie Coogan as Uncle Fester
- Jane Rose as Grandmama Eudora Addams
- Lisa Loring as Wednesday Addams (senior)
- Ken Weatherwax as Pugsley Addams (senior)
- Felix Silla as Cousin Itt
- Elvia Allman as Granny Hester Frump
- Henry Darrow as Pancho Addams
- Jennifer Surprenant as Wednesday Addams (junior)
- Ken Marquis as Pugsley Addams (junior)
- Parley Baer as Bones Lafferty
- Patrick Campbell as Louie the Lord
- Vito Scotti as Mikey
- Dean Sothern as Fake Gomez
- Terry Miller as Fake Morticia
- David B. Johns as Hercules
- Clinton Beyerle as Atlas
- George Ranito Jordan as First Cop
- Suzanne Krazna as Countess Dracula

== Production ==
Barbara Colyton (aka Estelle Barbara Barb), acquired some of the rights to her husband Charles Addams' Addams Family cartoons, after their divorce in the mid’60s. In 1977, Colyton approached David Levy who created the 1960s TV series about utilizing the characters on TV. After unsuccessfully pitching the revival to all three television networks, Levy successfully sold the pitch to producer Charles Fries who through his contract with NBC would produce a TV movie. Upon securing the rights, Fries believed they had secured all rights to The Addams Family but a week and a half before production was slated to begin they learned that certain elements developed for the TV series belong to series rights holder Filmways and were not part of the rights under control by Colyton and Levy.

Blossom Rock, who had originally portrayed Grandmama, was ill at the time of the production (she died in January 1978, nearly three months after this special aired), causing her role to be given to Jane Rose. Margaret Hamilton, who had portrayed Mother Frump, declined to appear in the film; her role was played by Elvia Allman. Character actors Parley Baer and Vito Scotti, who both had recurring roles in the original series, also appeared in the film, but as different characters than those they had portrayed originally.

The film was shot over the course of 12 days and often needed to work around John Astin's schedule as he was also shooting Operation Petticoat at the time. The house in which the movie was shot had previously been used to shoot Ben.

== Home media ==
In 1989, GoodTimes Home Video released Halloween with the New Addams Family on VHS.

== See also ==
- List of films set around Halloween
