= Wednesday (given name) =

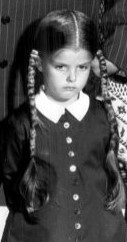
- Lisa Loring portrayed Wednesday Addams on the 1964 television sitcom The Addams Family.
- Gender: Female
- Language: English

Origin
- Meaning: Wednesday

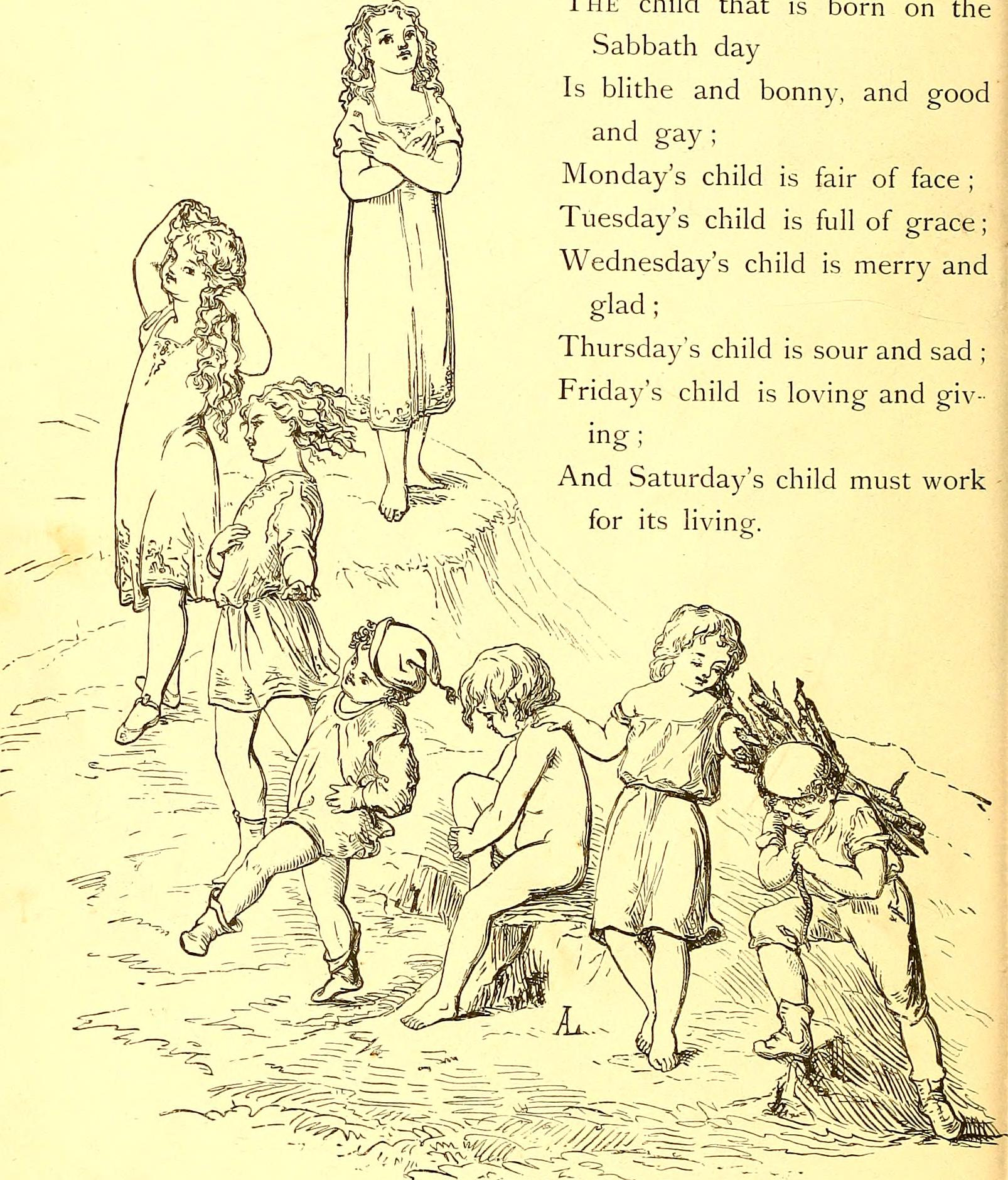
The name of Wednesday Addams was inspired by the nursery rhyme Monday's Child

Wednesday is a usually feminine given name, taken from the day of the week. It came into greater use after Charles Addams chose the name for Wednesday Addams on the 1964 television sitcom The Addams Family, which was based on the cartoons he originally published in The New Yorker magazine beginning in 1938. Addams based the name of the character on the line "Wednesday's child is full of woe" from the nursery rhyme Monday's Child. Fifteen newborn American girls were given the name Wednesday in 1965, the year after the show first aired, and at least five American girls have been given the name in each of the years since 1965. Usage of the name has increased in the United States since 2006, prompted by revivals of the Wednesday Addams character, most recently in the 2022 Netflix streaming series Wednesday. Actors Rupert Grint and Georgia Groome were inspired by Wednesday Addams when they named their daughter in 2020, a choice which drew media attention. In an interview, Grint predicted the name would continue to increase in popularity due to the Netflix series.

Notable people and characters with the name include:

== Nickname ==
- Wendy "Wednesday" Martin (born circa 1965), American author and cultural critic

== Stage name ==
- Wednesday Mourning, American actress and model

== Fictional characters ==
- Wednesday Addams, from the Addams Family multimedia franchise
