= Carel Struycken =

Dutch actor

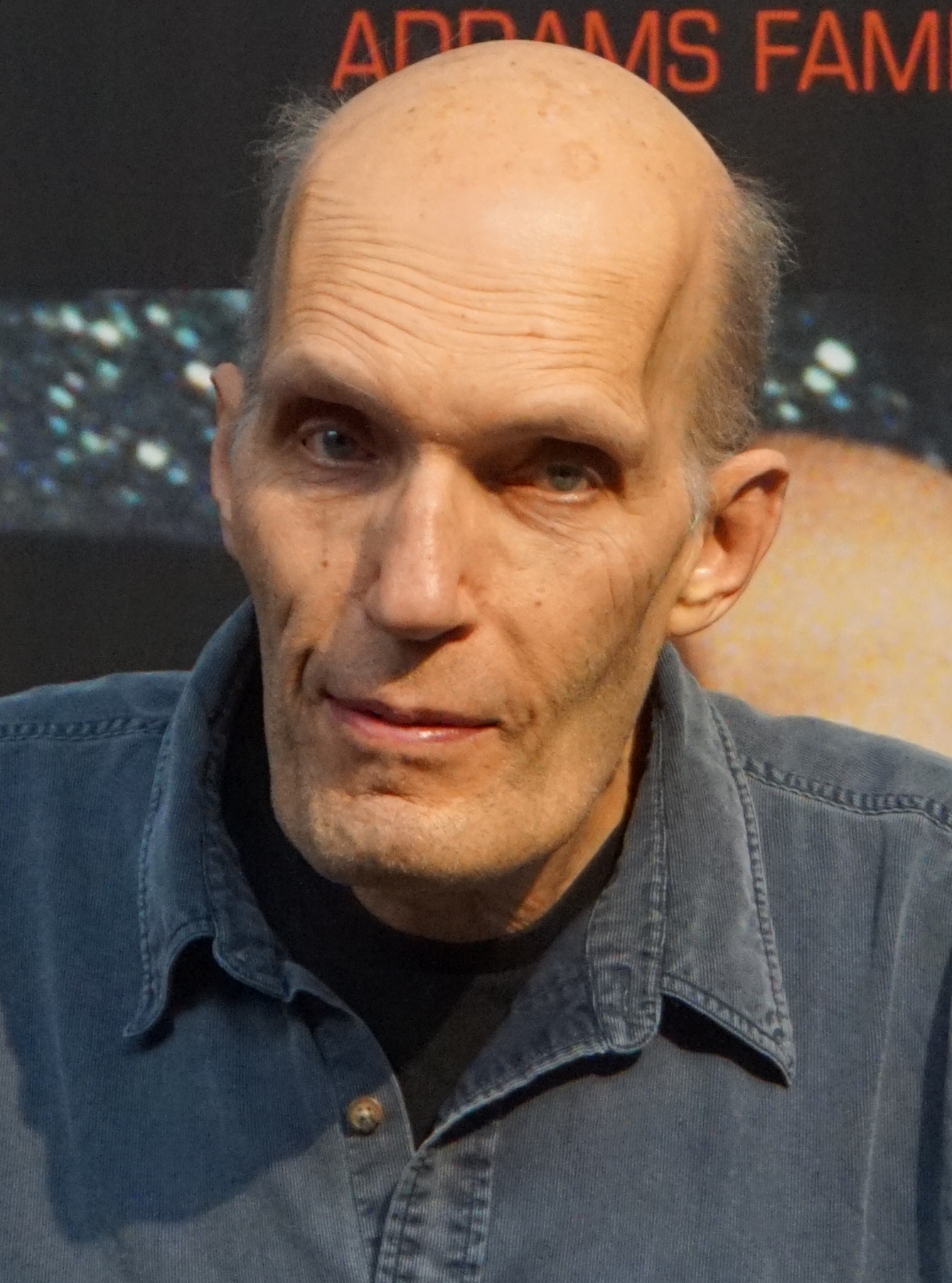
- Struycken at the 2016 Brussels Comic-Con
- Born: 30 July 1948 (age 78); The Hague, Netherlands
- Occupation: Actor
- Years active: 1978–present
- Height: 2.13 m (7 ft 0 in)
- Children: 2
- Relatives: Peter Struycken (brother)
- Website: carelstruycken.com

Carel Struycken (Dutch pronunciation: [ˈkaːrəl ˈstrœykə(n)]) (born 30 July, 1948) is a Dutch actor. He is known for playing the Giant/Fireman in the television series Twin Peaks (1990–1991, 2017), the occasional guest role of Mr. Homn in Star Trek: The Next Generation (1987–1992), and the household butler Lurch in the Addams Family films of 1991, 1993 and 1998. He also appeared in the films Men in Black (1997), Gerald's Game (2017) and Doctor Sleep (2019).

== Early life ==
Struycken was born in The Hague. When he was 4 years old, his family moved to Curaçao in the Netherlands Antilles. There, at age 15, he composed several Caribbean waltzes. At 16, he returned to his home country, where he finished secondary school. He graduated from the directing program at the film school in Amsterdam. After that, he spent a year at the American Film Institute, in Los Angeles.

== Career ==
In 1978, Struycken was discovered as an actor at the corner of Hollywood and Vine in Los Angeles by a woman who had abandoned her car in the middle of the street, calling after him: "We need you for a movie!". The film was Sgt. Pepper's Lonely Hearts Club Band.

Struycken played Terak in the 1985 TV film Ewoks: The Battle for Endor, a spin-off to the original Star Wars trilogy.

Struycken appeared as Fidel, Jack Nicholson's manservant, in the 1987 film The Witches of Eastwick. That same year, he appeared as Mr. Homn in "Haven", an episode of the television series Star Trek: The Next Generation, a role he would reprise in four more episodes until 1992.

In 1991, he starred as butler Lurch in the feature film The Addams Family. He reprised the role in the 1993 sequel, Addams Family Values, and the TV film Addams Family Reunion. Director Barry Sonnenfeld also picked Struycken for a small role in Men in Black.

He portrayed the mystical guide-character "The Giant" in David Lynch and Mark Frost's hit 1990–91 ABC television series Twin Peaks. He also appears in the 2017 sequel series, Twin Peaks: The Return. He appears as the "Moonlight Man" in the 2017 film Gerald's Game and "Grandpa Flick" in Doctor Sleep, the 2019 sequel to Stephen King's The Shining.

Struycken collaborated on several projects with writer and director Rene Daalder, including the 1986 punk rock musical Population: 1, which featured Tomata du Plenty, of The Screamers, and which was released on DVD in October 2008.

== Personal life ==
At age 20, he was diagnosed with acromegaly, which explains his tall height of 2.13 m (7 feet) and distinctive facial features.

Struycken is an avid photographer. He maintains a website devoted to his spherical panoramas and shares a photography blog with Josh Korwin.

He and his wife have two children. They reside in the Los Angeles area.

His brother Peter Struycken won the 2012 Heineken Prize for Arts of the Royal Netherlands Academy of Arts and Sciences.

In January 2025, his home was destroyed by the Eaton Fire.

== Filmography ==
=== Film ===
Year	Title	Role	Notes
1978	Sgt. Pepper's Lonely Hearts Club Band	The Brute	
1978	Tarzana	Mr. Mona	Short film, credited as Karyl Struycken
1980	Die Laughing	Gregor, The Giant	
1980	Go West, Young Man	Dr. Struycken	Also co-screenwriter
1984	The Prey	The Monster	
1985	Ewoks: The Battle for Endor	Terak	(TV movie)
1987	The Witches of Eastwick	Fidel	
1988	Night of the Kickfighters	Ponti	
1990	Framed	Jinx	(TV movie)
1991	Servants of Twilight	Kyle Barlow	
1991	The Addams Family	Lurch	
1993	Journey to the Center of the Earth	Dallas	(TV movie)
1993	Addams Family Values	Lurch	
1994	Oblivion	Mr. Gaunt	
1995	Under the Hula Moon	Clyde	
1995	Out There	Mr. Burke	(TV movie)
1996	Oblivion 2: Backlash	Mr. Gaunt	
1997	Men in Black	Arquillian	
1998	I Woke Up Early The Day I Died	The Undertaker	
1998	Addams Family Reunion	Lurch	(TV movie)
1999	Enemy Action	"Eyepatch"	
2000	Tinnef	Kran	(Video short)
2001	The Vampire Hunters Club	Host Vampire	(Video short)
2002	Science Fiction	Strange Man	
2002	Fatal Kiss	The Mortician	(TV movie)
2003	The War of the Starfighters	(voice)	
2004	Agavé	J.C / Cowboy	
2005	The Fallen Ones	High Priest No. 1	(TV movie)
2008	Sinterklaas en het Geheim van het Grote Boek	Dr. Ferdinand	
2014	Trophy Heads	Brother Humphrey	
2016	Another Brick in the Wall	Roy	
2017	Gerald's Game	Moonlight Man	
2019	Doctor Sleep	Grampa Flick	

=== Television ===
Year	Title	Role	Notes
1987	Hunter	Occult Store Owner	Season 4, Episodes "City of Passion: Part 1' "City of Passion: Part 2"
1988	St. Elsewhere	The Giant	Season 6, Episode "Fairytale Theater"
1990–1991	Twin Peaks	The Giant	5 episodes
1987–1992	Star Trek: The Next Generation	Mr. Homn	5 episodes
1994	Babylon 5	Trader	Season 2, Episode "Soul Mates"
1996	Star Trek: Voyager	Spectre	Season 2, Episode "The Thaw"
2002	Charmed	Tall Man	Season 4, Episode "Womb Raider"
2006	My Name Is Earl	Paul	Season 2, Episode "Sticks & Stones"
2010	Cold Case	Lester "Gargantuan" Smith	Season 7, Episode 14 "Metamorphisis"
2014	The Blacklist	Matthew Kincaid	Season 2, Episode 6 "The Mombasa Cartel (No. 114)"
2017	Twin Peaks: The Return	The Fireman	4 episodes

== Music videos ==
- 1983 "Mexican Radio" by Wall of Voodoo
- 1996 "A.D.I.D.A.S." by Korn
