= Grandmama (The Addams Family) =

Fictional character in the Addams family fiction

- The Addams Family character
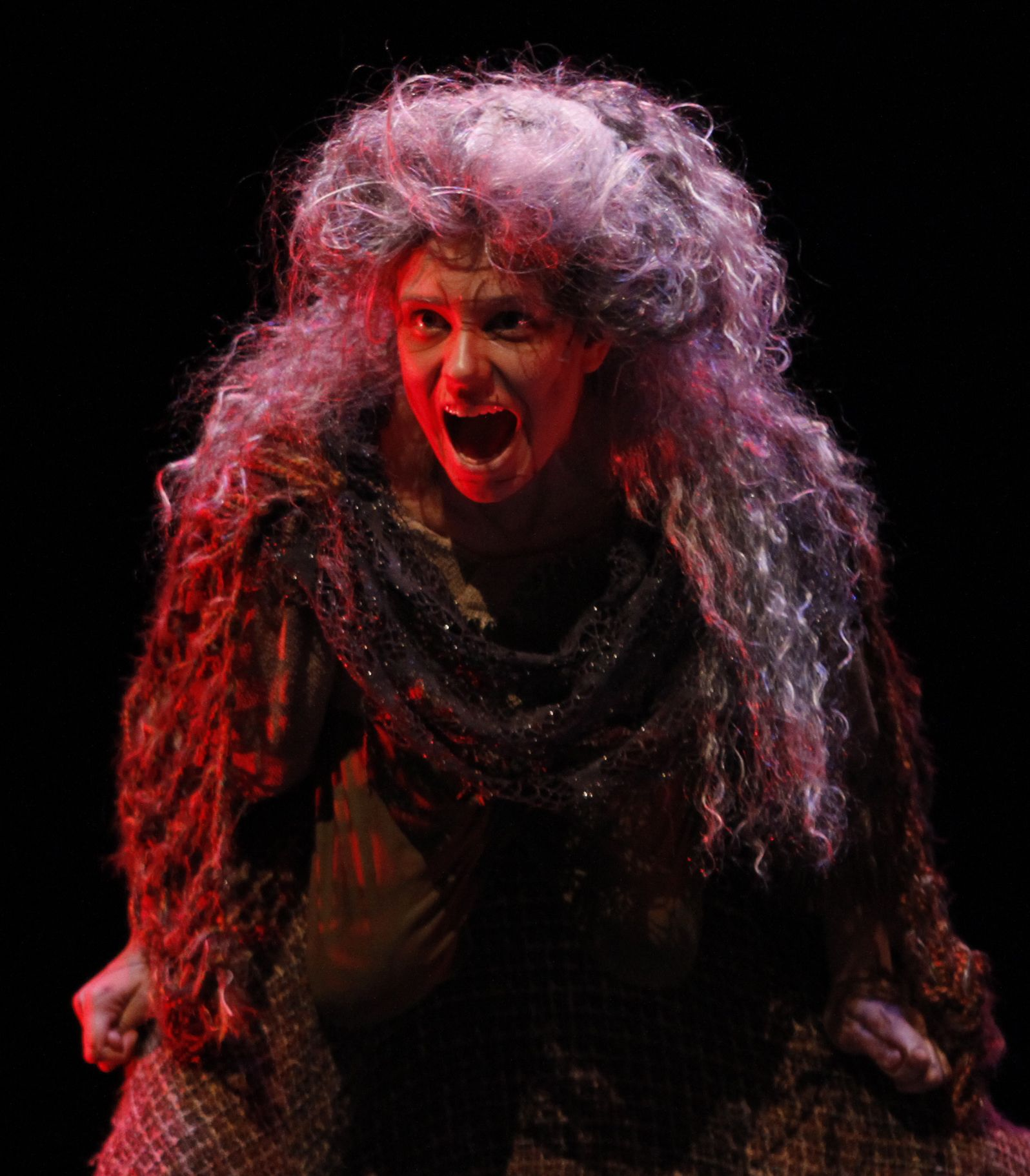
- Auber Tully, as Grandmama
- First appearance: The New Yorker (1938)
- Created by: Charles Addams
- Portrayed by: Blossom Rock (1964–1966); Jane Rose (1977); Judith Malina (1991); Carol Kane (1993); Alice Ghostley (1998); Betty Phillips (1998–1999); Jackie Hoffman (2010); Joanna Lumley (2025)
- Voiced by: Janet Waldo (1973); Carol Channing (1992–1993); Bette Midler (2019, 2021)

In-universe information
- Full name: Eudora Addams (in The New Addams Family); Hester Frump (in Wednesday)
- Species: Human
- Gender: Female
- Occupation: Witch
- Spouses: Father Addams (husband; 1991 film; deceased)
- Children: Gomez (son); Fester (originally brother-in-law in the 1964 TV series, son in later media); Pancho (younger son, Halloween with the New Addams Family)
- Relatives: Morticia (daughter-in-law); Wednesday (granddaughter); Pugsley (older grandson); Pubert (younger grandson, Addams Family Values); Wednesday Jr. (younger granddaughter, Halloween with the New Addams Family); Pugsley Jr. (youngest grandson, Halloween with the New Addams Family); Itt (cousin); Granny Frump (sister-in-law); Ophelia Frump (daughter-in-law); Debbie Addams (née Jellinsky) (daughter-in-law, Addams Family Values; deceased)

Grandmama is a fictional character in The Addams Family franchise, created by cartoonist Charles Addams and first appearing in his The New Yorker cartoons in 1938. She is the grandmother of Wednesday Addams and Pugsley Addams. Across various adaptations, her exact familial relationship shifts, as she is sometimes portrayed as the mother of Gomez Addams and at other times that of Morticia Addams. The role has been played or voiced by numerous performers, including Blossom Rock, Judith Malina, Carol Kane, Bette Midler and Joanna Lumley.

== Character background ==
"This disrespectful old hag is the mother of Gomez (husband of Morticia). She willingly helps with the dishes, cheats at solitaire and is thoroughly dishonest. She, too, is a favorite with the children and will make them cookies in the shape of bats, skulls and bones. Good humored about all and can be garrulous. The complexion is dark, the hair is white and frizzy and uncombed. She has a light beard and a large mole. She wears a shawl on all occasions, thick socks and fleece slippers under a bombazine skirt." — Charles Addams

Grandmama Addams is an aged witch who concocts potions and spells, and dabbles in fortune telling and knife throwing. She is the grandmother of the Addams children, Pugsley and Wednesday, although her relationship to the other family members is less consistent. Grandmama first appeared along with the then-unnamed Addams family in Charles Addams' original cartoons published in The New Yorker, in which she was regularly illustrated with shoulder-length frizzy hair and a fringed shawl.

=== Grandmama and Granny Frump ===
When asked to name his characters for the then upcoming 1964 TV adaptation, Charles Addams, creator of the original The New Yorker cartoon strips, first named the household's grandmother as Granny Frump and described her as Gomez's mother, thus making her Morticia's mother-in-law and Wednesday and Pugsley's paternal grandmother. But when the show was being made, the characters were instead given the surname of Addams after their creator, yet Grandmama remains Gomez's mother and "Frump" became Morticia's maiden name instead. A different Granny Frump appears in three episodes of the show, Grandmama's best friend Hester Frump and the mother of sisters Morticia Addams and Ophelia Frump (Hester is, probably, Fester's sister too). These versions of the characters were also used in the TV movie Halloween with the New Addams Family.

However, due to Charles Addams originally naming the character Granny Frump, both the feature films and animated television series had retconned her as being Morticia's mother and Wednesday and Pugsley's maternal grandmother instead. In the first film, Morticia and Fester discuss how "Mother and Father Addams" were killed by an angry mob. In the third film, Grandmama is named Esmeralda and is again Morticia's mother. The character is simply referred to as Granny Frump in the two animated series. In the 1992 series, Grandmama is of Morticia's side of the family, when she introduces herself with the line "the name's Granny Frump".

In the 1998-99 television series The New Addams Family, Grandmama is again Gomez's mother and, for the first time, Fester's mother. A separate Granny Frump also appears, once again as Morticia and Ophelia's mother. Here, Grandmama's full name is Eudora Addams, while Morticia's mother was renamed Griselda Frump.

In the Broadway musical The Addams Family, Morticia refers to Grandmama as Gomez and Uncle Fester's mother, to which Gomez reacts with surprise and says that he thought she was Morticia's mother. Morticia later says that Grandmama "may not even be part of this family".

In the animated film and its sequel, she is again Gomez and Fester's mother while Granny Frump is long dead.

In the Netflix show Wednesday, Grandmama Hester Frump is featured in season two as the mother of Morticia and her sister Ophelia.

== Appearances ==
=== Television and film ===
- The character was named "Grandmama" for the 1960s television series in order to avoid confusion with Granny from The Beverly Hillbillies. She was played by Blossom Rock, who won the role over actresses such as Minerva Urecal and Marjorie Bennett, while Alice Pearce had been rejected after the producers deemed her too young for the part. She is depicted as being good friends with Morticia's mother Granny Hester Frump (portrayed by Margaret Hamilton).
- Granny Frump appears in The New Scooby-Doo Movies episode "Wednesday is Missing" voiced by Janet Waldo.
- Janet Waldo also voiced Granny Frump in the 1973 animated series.
- Due to illness, Rock was the one regular cast member from the show who did not return for the 1977 reunion film Halloween with the New Addams Family, and she was replaced as Grandmama by Jane Rose. Granny Frump was also present helping with the Addams Family's Halloween party where she was portrayed by Elvia Allman.
- Carol Channing provided Granny Frump's voice for the 1992 animated series. In this show, she is shown to run a psychic hotline.
- Three different actresses played Granny in the three Addams Family feature films. Judith Malina, who played her in the 1991 film The Addams Family, was ostracized by others working on the movie after making an anti-war joke about burning the American flag, and was replaced by Carol Kane for the 1993 sequel Addams Family Values. For the 1998 direct-to-video picture Addams Family Reunion, Granny Frump was played by Alice Ghostley.
- Grandmama was played by Betty Phillips in the 1998-99 television series The New Addams Family. Like the original series, Grandmama is good friends with Granny Frump (portrayed by Meredith Bain Woodward).
- Bette Midler voiced the character in the 2019 animated film. She is shown to be Gomez's and Fester's mother. When she arrives at the Addams Family house before the Saber Mazurka following her robbery in Spain, she treats Pugsley to the candy that is on her feet. At one point, Grandmama called Lurch by the name of "Fabio". Grandmama is also revealed to have a dwarfish sister named Sloom (voiced by Jenifer Lewis) who oversees Pugsley's Saber Mazurka and had an argument with her which Grandmama claimed that she won.
  - Granny Frump is also in the film voiced by Catherine O'Hara. She and her husband Grandpa Frump (voiced by Martin Short) are long dead and Morticia holds a séance in the family cemetery to speak to them. It is also shown at the beginning of the film that Morticia possesses urns containing their ashes. When Morticia brings up Wednesday's friendship with Parker Needler, Granny and Grandpa Frump offer their advice to her and also bring up the time when Morticia ran away to join the girl scouts and learned that they roasted marshmallows and not girl scouts. At one point, Grandpa Frump forgot when he died to which Granny Frump stated that he died 20 years ago.
- Grandmama Addams appears in The Addams Family 2 voiced again by Bette Midler. While most of the Addams Family went on a cross-country road trip, Grandmama kept an eye on the house and threw a house party. When it got out of control, Grandmama called Cousin Itt to help get it back under control. By the time the Addams Family returned to their house, Grandmama and Cousin Itt had restored the house back to what it was before the party.
- Granny Frump appears in the second season of the Netflix series Wednesday, portrayed by Joanna Lumley. This version has become a mortuary mogul and successful businesswoman where her relationship with Morticia was strained following an incident regarding Ophelia, but she shares a strong bond with Wednesday. Contrasting with her previous hag-like portrayals, Hester is a wealthy patrician woman and served by a female butler/chauffeur named Varicose (portrayed by Liv Spencer). Hester is also a psychic like her daughters and granddaughter.

=== Miscellaneous ===
- In the 1989 Nintendo Entertainment System game Fester's Quest, the instruction booklet says Grandmama's psychic powers foretold the alien invasion that would come and abduct all the people in the city, so she invokes a curse on the family mansion. As a result, when extraterrestrial scouts scan the Addams residence for life forms they find none, thanks to Grandmama's curse.
- Grandmama was played by Jackie Hoffman in the 2010 Broadway musical, in which her relation to the family in the storyline is ambiguous. In Act Two, Morticia tells Gomez that "[his] mother came to our home and now she's here forever" to which he replies "wait, I thought she was your mother", referencing Grandmama's ever changing relation to the family in the franchise. Morticia later says that Grandmama "may not even be part of this family".

== Relationships ==
=== Family tree ===
Addams family tree

Grandmama (Note: In the Broadway musical The Addams Family, Morticia refers to Grandmama as Gomez and Uncle Fester's mother, to which Gomez reacts with surprise and says that he had thought she was Morticia's mother. Morticia later says that Grandmama "may not even be part of this family", referencing Grandmama's ever-changing relation to the family.)
Debbie Jellinsky (Note: Established in the 1993 film Addams Family Values.)	Uncle Fester	Cousin Itt	Margaret Alford	Tully Alford
Mal Beineke (Note: Established in the Broadway musical The Addams Family.)	Alice Beineke	Gomez Addams	Morticia Addams (née Frump)	Rupert Styx (Note: Established in the 1964 episode "Halloween with the Addams Family".)
Lucas Beineke	Wednesday Addams	Pugsley Addams	Pubert Addams
Wednesday Addams Jr. (Note: Established in the 1977 film Halloween with the New Addams Family.)	Pugsley Addams Jr.
