= Addams Family Reunion =

1998 film directed by Dave Payne

- Official VHS cover
- Directed by: Dave Payne
- Written by: Rob Kerchner; Scott Sandin
- Based on: The Addams Family by Charles Addams
- Produced by: Mike Elliott
- Starring: Daryl Hannah; Tim Curry
- Cinematography: Christian Sebaldt
- Edited by: J. J. Jackson
- Music by: Amotz Plessner
- Production company: Saban Entertainment
- Distributed by: Warner Home Video
- Release date: September 22, 1998
- Running time: 91 minutes
- Country: United States
- Language: English

Addams Family Reunion is a 1998 American comedy film based on the characters from the cartoon created by cartoonist Charles Addams. Directed by Dave Payne, the film was intended to serve as a pilot for a new proposed television series produced by Saban. The film stars Daryl Hannah and Tim Curry as Morticia and Gomez Addams respectively, while Carel Struycken and Christopher Hart are the only ones to reprise their roles from the last two films. The film's plot focuses on the eccentric, macabre aristocratic Addams family mistakenly arriving at the wrong family reunion and encountering a man (Ed Begley Jr.) who seeks to commit murder in order to inherit a fortune.

Payne had intended to give the film a dark, edgy tone. However, Saban had interfered with the development, insisting that the story be aimed solely at entertaining children, and lack much of the black comedy and satire of the previous films. Saban also wanted Payne to imitate aspects of Paramount Pictures' films, and the 1964 TV series, and rejected any original idea developed by Payne and the film's screenwriters. As a result, the film was poorly received by critics, who criticized the film's screenplay, special effects, production design, and much of its acting, while singling out Tim Curry's performance for praise.

== Plot ==
Discovering that his grandparents have developed "Waltzheimer's disease", a disease that is slowly turning them "normal", Gomez plans a family reunion, hoping that some branch of his enormous family tree will find a cure. However, Gomez sends a card written in blood, which damages the machines of the company organizing the reunion and results in the Addamses receiving the wrong invitation.

Gomez, Morticia, Fester, Lurch, and the grandparents drive to a luxury resort for the family reunion. Gomez meets psychiatrist Dr. Philip Adams and his sister Katherine Adams, who plan to poison their wealthy father Walter Adams to get their inheritance and frame their younger brother. Gomez hopes that Dr. Adams can cure his grandparents.

Philip and Katherine's younger brother and his wife, who are headed to the reunion, are given the wrong address and end up in the Addams family mansion, where Granny and Cousin Itt are staying. They stay there as guests, but are increasingly abused by their hosts. Granny learns that the wife is vegetarian, so she feeds her with a plant: deadly nightshade. Cousin Itt plays poker with the husband, and wins over most of the man's fortune.

Pugsley falls in love with Gina Adams, Katherine's bespectacled, bug obsessed daughter. Wednesday antagonizes two of her new snobby "cousins", children of Philip. Lurch saves Katherine from drowning in the swimming pool. He falls in love with the woman, while she is disgusted with him. Walter Adams expresses his hatred for his son and most of his family. Fester and Thing do their best to capture Butcher, Fester's mutated puppy who feeds on human hair.

Philip initially refuses to help Gomez in any way, but agrees to a bet. If he beats Gomez in a game, he will earn thousands of dollars. If Gomez wins, Philip will offer his services to him. Philip is overconfident, as he is a champion in many games. But Gomez easily defeats him in successive challenges, in the games of darts, table tennis, and tennis. Philip is publicly humiliated in the process.

Instead of offering his services as previously agreed, an enraged Philip attacks Gomez in public. They have a knife fight, which Gomez eventually wins. While Gomez holds his knife to Philip's throat, the police arrive. Gomez and Morticia are arrested for attempted murder, Pugsley and Wednesday are arrested for digging open the grave of the resort's founders. Fester is considered insane and becomes a mental patient, while Butcher and Thing are captured by a sadistic dog catcher. Lurch has been buried alive by Wednesday and is unable to escape.

Pugsley and Wednesday are taken in by child services, Katherine secretly called child services to get rid of the Addams so no one can stand in her and Philip's way of getting wealthy, and placed in foster care with Philip's wife. Meanwhile, Philip gains custody over Fester and tortures him with an electric chair. He has previously used this chair to torture other patients. The dog-catcher plans to feed Thing to one of his dogs. Gomez and Morticia are unable to escape a police cell.

Walter Adams has taken a liking to Gomez, and posts bail for him and Morticia. He helps them rescue Lurch, who then helps rescue the rest of the family. Pugsley and Wednesday were in the process of torturing their foster family, but are happily reunited with their parents. The Addams Family strap Philip in his own electric chair, and have him tortured by his patients.

The Addams Family eventually return to their mansion, and leave their increasingly "normal" grandparents in the care of Philip's wife. Walter Adams bids farewell to the Addams and leaves for California and cutting ties to his Adams family. Wednesday amuses herself with lighting fireworks, while Pugsley seems melancholic. Gomez asks him if he misses Gina, but Pugsley is instead sad because he forgot his "Siberian firecracker" back at the foster family's house.

At this point, the "firecracker" is revealed to have been a nuclear weapon and the Addams Family witness a distant nuclear explosion apparently caused by it. Morticia comments that a nuclear winter is swiftly approaching and that she feels gloomy. Gomez and Morticia kiss, finishing the film.

== Cast ==
- Tim Curry as Gomez Addams
- Daryl Hannah as Morticia Addams
- Nicole Fugere as Wednesday Addams
- Jerry Messing as Pugsley Addams
- Patrick Thomas as Uncle Fester Addams
- Carel Struycken as Lurch
- Christopher Hart's hand as Thing
- Alice Ghostley as Grandmama Addams
- Kevin McCarthy as Great-grandfather Mortimer Addams
- Estelle Harris as Great-grandmother Delilah Addams
- Haylie Duff as Gina Adams
- Phil Fondacaro as Cousin Itt
- Ed Begley Jr. as Dr. Philip Adams
- Ray Walston as Walter Adams
- Diane Delano as Dolores Adams
- Heidi Noelle Lenhart as Melinda Adams
- Hilary Shepard Turner as Katherine Adams
- Rodger Halston as Geoff Adams
- Clint Howard as Dogcatcher (uncredited)
- Conrad Janis as Hotel Bar Patron (uncredited)
- Leigh Taylor-Young as Patrice (uncredited)

== Production ==
=== Pre-production ===
Following the success of the theatrically released films The Addams Family, released in 1991 and its 1993 sequel, Addams Family Values, Saban negotiated to purchase the home video production rights to the Addams Family brand in order to take advantage of the direct-to-video market. Because of the underwhelming commercial performance of Addams Family Values, as well as the death of Raúl Juliá, who had played Gomez Addams, Paramount Pictures ultimately decided not to produce a third film, resulting in Saban deciding to reboot the series.

Addams Family Reunion was co-produced by Saban with Warner Bros. The two studios planned to produce a new series called The New Addams Family, and intended to produce a two-hour pilot film for the series, which eventually became Addams Family Reunion; Saban planned to premiere the film on a cable network owned by the company before releasing it on video, and to follow the film with a television series if the film did well.

Addams Family Reunion was scripted by Rob Kerchner, who had experience writing numerous direct-to-video sequels, and Scott Sandin; Saban wanted the script to be aimed only for children, with little attempt made to engage an adult audience. Dave Payne, whose directorial experience came from making direct-to-video low-budget horror films for Roger Corman, was hired to direct.

According to Payne, Saban had purchased the rights from Charles Addams' estate, and he felt he could start fresh and create a dark fantasy film, comparing the approach he wanted to take as director to the Coen brothers. However, Payne says, Saban wanted him to imitate Barry Sonnenfeld's films and the 1964 TV show, and any original idea proposed by Payne and the screenwriters was rejected. In addition to the film lacking the previous entries' black comedy, Nathan Rabin also said that Addams Family Reunion has little of the anarchic satire of the Sonnenfeld films; according to Rabin, the only satirical aspect of the film is that the "normal" Adams family, whose reunion the Addamses mistakenly attend, "turns out to be far more devious, conniving, and evil than the morbid but basically good Addams clan".

=== Casting ===
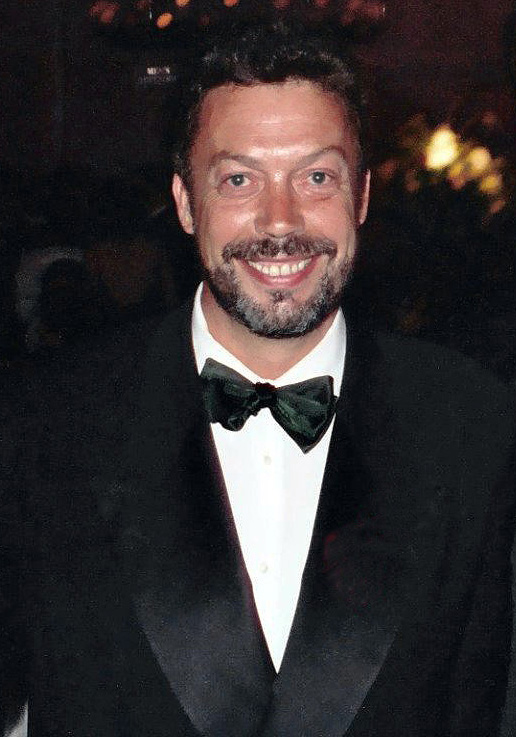
Tim Curry was singled out for praise in his performance as Gomez Addams. While the film was otherwise poorly reviewed, reviewers called Curry's performance the best part of the film.

The producers wanted to bridge the gap in continuity between the Paramount films and the new series, and reached out to Anjelica Huston and Christopher Lloyd to reprise their roles as Morticia Addams and Uncle Fester, but both declined out of respect for Raul Julia, who played Gomez in the Paramount films and had died in 1994. Christina Ricci and Jimmy Workman were too old to reprise their roles as Wednesday and Pugsley Addams. The only actors to reprise their roles from the Paramount films were Carel Struycken as Lurch, and Christopher Hart as Thing.

Recast as Gomez and Morticia Addams were Tim Curry and Daryl Hannah, with Pat Thomas as Fester and Nicole Fugere as Wednesday, a role she would later reprise for The New Addams Family TV series, the only member of the film's cast to do so. According to Payne, he and Curry both felt that Gomez should be played "weird", in contrast to the Latin lothario Raúl Juliá had created for the Paramount duo of films. Much of the film's cast, including Alice Ghostley, Ray Walston, Clint Howard, and Ed Begley Jr., had appeared in numerous direct-to-video films.

=== Filming ===
Addams Family Reunion was shot in Los Angeles, California on a 30-day schedule. Ed Begley Jr. arrived on set unprepared for his first day of filming as a tennis pro, explaining that he had no idea how to play tennis, resulting in the director shooting around Begley's inability to play the sport, and the actor was also difficult to costume, because, as a dedicated environmentalist, Begley would not wear any animal-based clothing such as leather.

== Music ==
The show's famous theme song was performed in a doo-wop rendition by the group Strate Vocalz, which Yahoo! described as being "terrible". According to Payne, he had developed a "dark and edgy" opening sequence with appropriate music by the film's composer, but Saban, without his knowledge, had replaced his original opening title sequence and the original music with "some boy band, in bright fluorescent-colored shirts".

== Release and reception ==
Addams Family Reunion was released on September 22, 1998 straight-to-video to coincide with the 60th anniversary of the first Addams Family cartoon.

The film was poorly received by critics, being compared unfavorably to the Paramount films, which reviewers felt Saban and Warner Bros. had tried, unsuccessfully, to imitate. Nathan Rabin wrote that "the dialogue is awful, the acting sitcom-broad [...] [and] the direction [is] unremarkable". Other points of criticism made in negative reviews included poor CGI and cheap-looking production design. However, Bloody Disgusting, Den of Geek and Nathan Rabin praised Tim Curry's performance as Gomez Addams.
