= Pugsley Addams =

Fictional character

- The Addams Family character
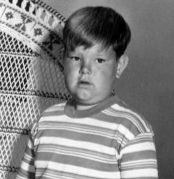
- Ken Weatherwax as Pugsley in The Addams Family television series
- First appearance: The New Yorker (1938)
- Created by: Charles Addams
- Portrayed by: Ken Weatherwax (1964–1966, 1977); Jimmy Workman (1991–1993); Jerry Messing (1998); Brody Smith (1998); Adam Riegler (2010); Isaac Ordonez (2022–present)
- Voiced by: Jodie Foster (1973); Jeannie Elias (1992–1993); Finn Wolfhard (2019); Javon Walton (2021)
- Age: 8 (original 1964 series); 11 (in later adaptations)

In-universe information
- Gender: Male
- Family: Gomez (father) Morticia (mother) Wednesday (sister) Pubert Addams (younger brother, Addams Family Values) Wednesday Jr. (younger sister, Halloween with the New Addams Family) Pugsley Jr. (youngest brother, Halloween with the New Addams Family) Fester (originally maternal great-uncle in the 1964 series, paternal uncle from then on) Pancho (paternal uncle, Halloween with the New Addams Family) Debbie Jellinsky Addams (paternal aunt via marriage to Fester, Addams Family Values; deceased) Vasco Addams (father's paternal uncle) Cousin Itt (father's cousin) Margaret Addams (Cousin Itt's wife) What Addams (Cousin Itt and Margaret Addams's son) Grandmama Addams (paternal grandmother) Hester Frump (maternal grandmother) Ophelia Frump (maternal aunt) Goody Addams (ancestor; Wednesday)

Pugsley Pubert Addams is a member of the fictional Addams Family, created by American cartoonist Charles Addams.

== Cartoons ==
Pugsley is depicted as a brilliant, but devious, young boy in Charles Addams's original cartoons. He is often shown releasing sailboats in the park with other children, except his boats were macabre in nature.

== Depictions and characteristics ==
Pugsley was represented as being the oldest child of Morticia and Gomez Addams in the original series: he is a young boy (his age is given as 8 years old in the pilot episode, The Addams Family Goes to School, but is changed to 10 years old in the second episode) who is almost always seen wearing a striped T-shirt and shorts. Originally unnamed (as were all of the family members), the character who was apparently the prototype for Pugsley first appeared in the Charles Addams cartoons in The New Yorker during the 1930s. In this first incarnation, he was portrayed as a deviant child with a vicious nature, shown committing deplorable acts with his sister. In all incarnations, he is overweight. In the original series, Pugsley is 4'7" tall and weighs 112 pounds. He usually eats over six pieces of cake at birthday parties.

An energetic monster of a boy… blond red hair, popped blue eyes and a dedicated troublemaker, in other words, the kid next door… genius in his own way, he makes toy guillotines, full size racks, threatens to poison his sister, can turn himself into a Mr. Hyde with an ordinary chemical set… his voice is hoarse… [he] is sometimes allowed an occasional cigar.

— Charles Addams

When the characters were given names for the television series, he was originally going to be called "Pubert" (a derivation of the word puberty, possibly a reflection of his age, which has consistently remained either 12, 13, or 14, making him a young teenager) but it was rejected as it sounded too sexual, and the name Pugsley was chosen instead. The name Pubert was later used when Gomez and Morticia have a third child in the film Addams Family Values. The Lurch Files' Addams Family Tree lists Pugsley's middle name as Pubert, probably as an homage to Charles Addams' original suggestion.

In the 1960s television series, Pugsley is played by child actor Ken Weatherwax. This incarnation of the character is more jovial and inventive; he displays outlandish engineering skills, including the invention of a disintegrator gun, an anti-gravity gun, and other devices. He and Gomez created a computer named Whizzo and a robot named Smiley (played by Robby the Robot) together. Pugsley and his younger sister Wednesday often play together, rarely exhibiting signs of sibling rivalry; they share an interest in spiders, dynamite, guillotines, and other dangerous "toys" and often play with them together. At Wednesday's request, Pugsley often guillotines Wednesday's beloved Marie Antoinette doll.

In an early episode, "Morticia and the Psychiatrist", the rest of the family is concerned that Pugsley is engaging in behavior they consider "odd": wearing a Boy Scout uniform, playing with a puppy, etc. When sent to a psychiatrist, Pugsley tells of boyhood incidents involving hangings, machine guns, and grenades, with no clue that others might find these accounts unusual. However, no other episodes portray him this way, and he remains more interested in the dark and disturbing side of inventions and science.

In most incarnations of the character, Pugsley had an unusual hobby of stealing road signs, which he used to adorn the walls and door of his bedroom. This may have evolved from an original Addams cartoon in which, rather than road signs, he would steal and decorate his room with cautionary signs, such as high voltage and shallow water signs, thus leading others into danger. He also has a pet octopus named Aristotle; in the animated 2019 film and 2020 sequel, Aristotle has a half-sibling named Socrates, who is Wednesday's pet squid. He also has retained his penchant for using guillotines, and owns a miniature guillotine in the 1991 film, which he uses to chop fruits.

In the 1970s, in the animated series about the family, Pugsley was voiced by actress Jodie Foster. Foster voiced that same character in an episode of The New Scooby-Doo Movies. In the second animated series, Pugsley was voiced by Jeannie Elias. These depictions remain more faithful to the originals.

In the 1977 TV movie Halloween with the New Addams Family, Ken Weatherwax played a grown-up Pugsley, who is now studying at a medical school in Nairobi to become a witch-doctor. In the interval between the original TV series and this movie, his parents have had two more children, who look just like the original Pugsley and Wednesday, and as such are called Pugsley Jr. and Wednesday Jr., respectively. In all incarnations, he generally has a close relationship with his father and Uncle Fester, who wants to help him get girls in some versions. He is known as Pericles Addams in Latin American Spanish-speaking countries and in Brazilian Portuguese as Feioso (meaning "Ugly").

In the 1998 series The New Addams Family, Pugsley is played by Vancouver native Brody Smith in a very similar portrayal to the 1960s incarnation, although he is stated to be younger than Wednesday.

In the films The Addams Family and its sequel Addams Family Values, released in 1991 and 1993 respectively, he is still the inventor of the family, often creating dangerous inventions, but while he is smart when it comes to science and creating inventions he is slightly dense, believing almost everything his sister says, being unable to realize that his way of playing with his younger brother may harm him, and is younger than Wednesday. He is depicted as being violent, shooting a bird with an arrow while at camp, afraid of wholesome Disney movies (when forced to watch them, Wednesday's friend Joel asserts that he is 'only a child' and should not have to suffer through watching them), and his relationship with Wednesday is generally darker; although they care for each other, she often tries to torture him and perform science experiments on him, and he returns the favor on occasion, though they are both shown to enjoy the pain, with Pugsley being unhappy when Morticia objects to Wednesday electrocuting him.

In the animated films, he is shown to be a very messy boy, and he prefers to not use plates while eating, and eats with his hands, and also plays in the mud, which causes him to be very dirty and unkempt, usually sporting dirt on his shirt. In the first film, he is chided by his father for not using the Addams men's typical swords in battle and using bombs instead, and he ends up failing a ritual in which Addams men disarm other members of the family with their swords, but ends up teaching his family that using other weapons is acceptable too. In the second film, he plays a more minor role, but as he has in many other portrayals he tries to attract women and ends up dating a human briefly turned into a pig called Ophelia; in the earlier scenes of the film he is seen following his Uncle Fester's questionable dating advice, to chaotic consequences.

Isaac Ordonez portrays Pugsley in Netflix series Wednesday. He is younger than Wednesday, and his hair is now black instead of blonde. He is shown to be often bullied at school as well, which Wednesday protects him from, stating that she is the only one allowed to torture Pugsley. He is more explicitly close to Wednesday, and is nervous about his father being accused of a crime; is also stated to enjoy fishing, though he throws a bomb into water to kill fish instead of using a typical bait. In the second season of the series, Pugsley is shown to be electrogentic/electrokinetic and able to project electricity, much like his uncle Fester. He also begins attending Nevermore Academy, a boarding school for people with supernatural abilities, along with his sister, where he becomes friends and roommates with Eugene Ottinger, one of Wednesday's friends. After hearing a story about the rise and fall of a former student, Pugsley accidentally reanimates the student as a zombie while trying to become popular and keeps the zombie as a pet, naming him "Slurp". The zombie is later revealed to be Gomez's former friend Isaac Night, who had tricked him into powering a machine intended to save his sister, Françoise—an experiment that would have killed Gomez if Morticia had not intervened. After regenerating his body, Isaac kidnaps Pugsley and attempts to sacrifice him using the same method he had previously intended for Gomez to save Françoise, but Wednesday rescues him.

== Film versions ==
Wednesday (left) and Pugsley in The Addams Family film (1991)

In the film The Addams Family and its sequel, Addams Family Values, Pugsley is played by Jimmy Workman. He acts as an unwitting accomplice to his older sister, Wednesday, who makes attempts to inflict lethal harm upon him – although he has returned the favor on occasion.

In The Addams Family, Pugsley and Wednesday open a lemonade stand, but their drinks are toxic, and cause Lurch to spit flames when he tries it.

In Addams Family Values, Wednesday and Pugsley are sent to Camp Chippewa, a summer camp, where they are forced to participate in a Thanksgiving-themed play entitled A Turkey Called Brotherhood. Pugsley is cast as a dancing turkey, and leads the children in a chorus of "Eat Me"; He is later seen assisting Wednesday in overthrowing the camp counselors and setting fire to the grounds.

In the film Addams Family Reunion, Pugsley (now played by Jerry Messing) behaves (for the most part) similarly to his previous two film incarnations. At the Addams Family's family reunion he falls for a young girl named Gina (played by Haylie Duff). According to Pugsley, his name means "stomach pump" in Bulgarian.

In the Broadway musical The Addams Family, Pugsley is played by Adam Riegler as the younger sibling, around eleven years old, seven years younger than 18-year-old Wednesday (played by Krysta Rodriguez).

In the national tour (2011–2012), Pugsley was played by Patrick D. Kennedy (u.s. Jason Testa). Ethan Wexler replaced Jason Testa in March 2012.

Finn Wolfhard voices Pugsley in the 2019 animated movie. Javon "Wanna" Walton replaces Wolfhard as the voice of Pugsley in the 2021 sequel, which was released on October 1, 2021.

== Relationships ==
=== Family tree ===
Addams family tree

Grandmama (Note: In the Broadway musical The Addams Family, Morticia refers to Grandmama as Gomez and Uncle Fester's mother, to which Gomez reacts with surprise and says that he had thought she was Morticia's mother. Morticia later says that Grandmama "may not even be part of this family", referencing Grandmama's ever-changing relation to the family.)
Debbie Jellinsky (Note: Established in the 1993 film Addams Family Values.)	Uncle Fester	Cousin Itt	Margaret Alford	Tully Alford
Mal Beineke (Note: Established in the Broadway musical The Addams Family.)	Alice Beineke	Gomez Addams	Morticia Addams (née Frump)	Rupert Styx (Note: Established in the 1964 episode "Halloween with the Addams Family".)
Lucas Beineke	Wednesday Addams	Pugsley Addams	Pubert Addams
Wednesday Addams Jr. (Note: Established in the 1977 film Halloween with the New Addams Family.)	Pugsley Addams Jr.
