= Felix Silla =

Italian actor (1937–2021)

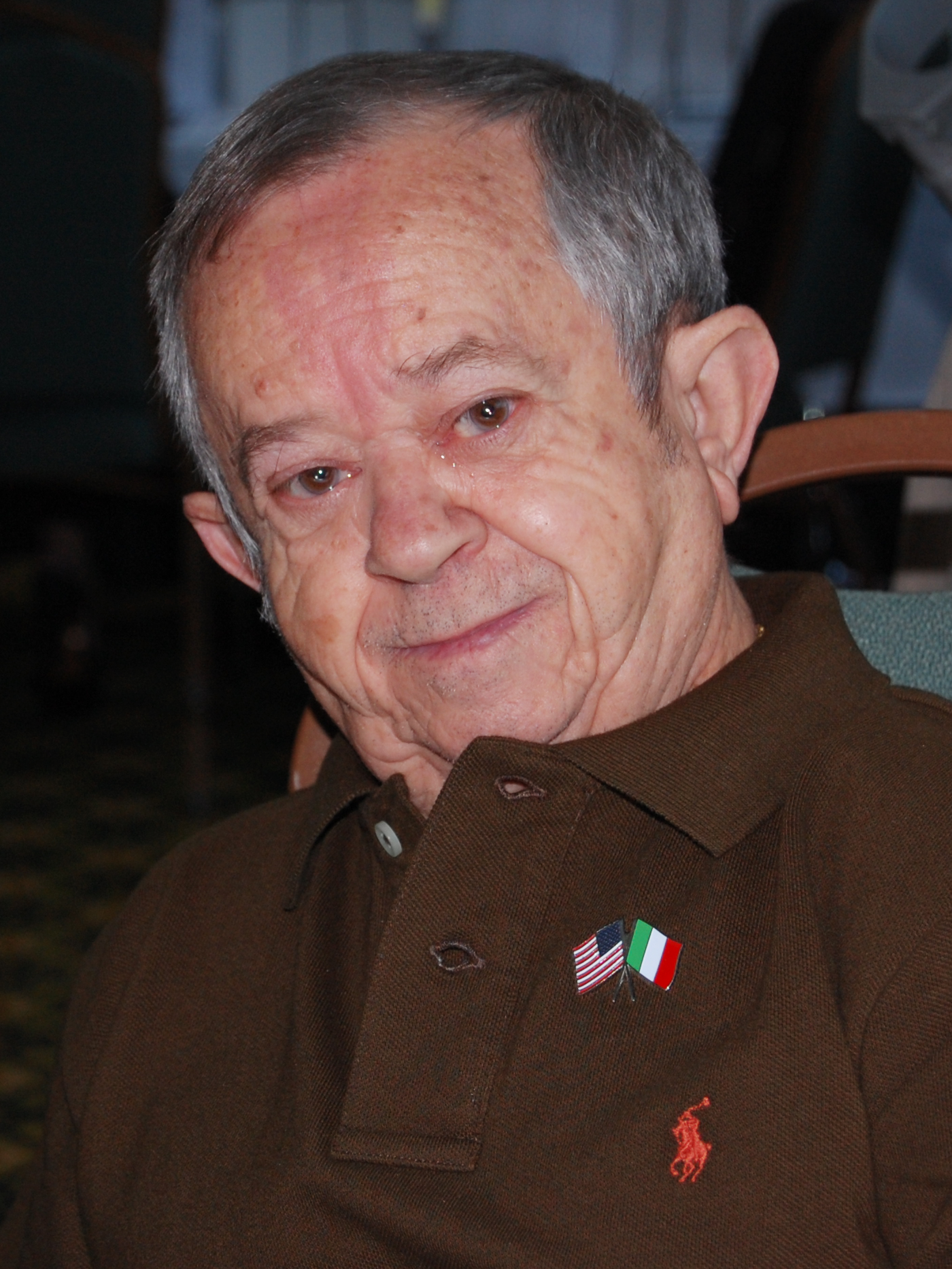
- Silla in 2007
- Born: Felice Anthony Silla; January 11, 1937; Roccacasale, Abruzzo, Kingdom of Italy
- Died: April 16, 2021 (aged 84); Las Vegas, Nevada, U.S.
- Occupations: Actor; stuntman
- Years active: 1955–2021
- Spouse: Sue Silla (m. 1965)
- Children: 4

Felix Anthony Silla (January 11, 1937 – April 16, 2021), also credited as Felix Cilla, was an Italian character actor, circus performer, voice artist and movie stuntman, best known for his career in Hollywood in TV and film.

Silla started his career in the circus, but is best known from television's The Addams Family as Cousin Itt, a costumed character. Itt was only in one of Charles Addams original comics and his demeanor was created for the show. The character's voice was provided by series director Nat Perrin and Anthony Magro.

Silla featured in the Star Wars film Return of the Jedi as one of the hang glider Ewoks.

He was also a voice artist on The Sims 2 video game.

== Biography ==
=== Early life and circus career ===
Felix Silla was born on January 11, 1937, in the small village of Roccacasale, Abruzzo, Italy. He trained as a circus performer and came to the United States aged 18, in 1955, touring with the Ringling Bros. and Barnum & Bailey Circus. His multiple talents as a bareback horse rider, trapeze artist, and tumbler brought him to Hollywood, where he became a stuntman, appearing in the film, A Ticklish Affair.

=== Film and television ===
His best-known roles include Litvak, the maniacal, miniature Hitler who menaces George Segal in film The Black Bird (his favorite role). He was also responsible for the physical performance of the robot Twiki in the TV series Buck Rogers in the 25th Century, a role for which the voice was supplied by Mel Blanc or Bob Elyea.

In part due to his short stature of 1.19 m (3 ft 11 in), he often doubled for children in such movies as The Towering Inferno, The Hindenburg, and Battlestar Galactica as well as Meatballs 2 as the alien. Between movies, he frequently appeared in Las Vegas and Reno, Nevada, night clubs with his own musical combo, The Original Harmonica Band.

=== Voice-art work ===
Silla provided his voice for the character Mortimer Goth in the 2004 video game The Sims 2.

== Famous characters ==
=== The Addams Family: Cousin Itt ===
Silla became famous however as the recurring costumed character of Cousin Itt on television's The Addams Family. The character was only in one of Charles Addams original comics, but his demeanor was created for the original black and white television series by producer David Levy, debuting in the 1965 first-season episode "Cousin Itt Visits the Addams Family", and appearing in a total of 19 episodes, 17 of which featured Silla and Roger Arroyo, over the course of the show's two seasons. The character's voice was usually provided by studio sound engineer Anthony Magro (1923–2004). The character became so popular it was carried over to subsequent licensed media including film, stage and video games.

=== Star Wars: Ewoks ===
He played one of the hang glider Ewoks in the film Star Wars Return of the Jedi in 1983.

== Death ==
Felix Silla died on April 16, 2021, from pancreatic cancer at the age of 84, in Las Vegas, Nevada.

== Filmography (as actor) ==
Name	Year	Role
Bonanza (TV series)	1963	Sean
Grimdl (TV series)	1963	Flaged
Petticoat Junction (TV series)	1965	Baron Munchin
The Addams Family (original TV series)	1965–1966 (17 episodes)	Cousin Itt. (costumed character)
Star Trek (TV series)	Talosian (uncredited)	
The Girl from U.N.C.L.E. (TV series)	1966	Circus Performer
The Monkees (TV series)	1967	Willy the Midget in S1:E22, "Monkees at the Circus"
She Freak (film)	1967	Shorty
Point Blank (film)	1967	Bellhop
Planet of the Apes (film)	1968	Child Gorilla
The April Fools (film)	1969	Waiter at Safari Club
Justine	1969	Child Prostitute
H.R. Pufnstuf (TV series)	1969–1970	Polka Dotted Horse - Various Characters
Pufnstuf (film version, based on above)	1970	Polka Dotted Horse
Bewitched (TV series)	1967/1970	Goblin/Troll
Night Gallery (TV series)	1971	Baby New Year (uncredited)
Lidsville (TV series)	1971–1972	Colonel Poom
Little Cigars (film)	1973	Frankie
Sssssss (film)	1973	Sam Lee the Seal Boy
Don't Be Afraid of the Dark (TV movie)	1973	Creature
Lincoln (TV miniseries)	1974	General Tom Thumb
The Black Bird (film)	1975	Litvak
Mastermind	1975	Scahatzi
Black Samurai (film)	1976	Little Hitman Reinhardt
Mary Hartman, Mary Hartman (TV series)	1977	Chuck
Demon Seed (film)	1977	Baby
The Kentucky Fried Movie (film)	1977	Crazed Clown
Halloween with the New Addams Family (TV movie)	1977	Cousin Itt.
The Manitou	1978	Misquamacus
The Lord of the Rings (voice)	1979	Character actor
Battlestar Galactica (TV series)	1978–1979	
Buck Rogers in the 25th Century	1979–1981	Twiki (body)
Under the Rainbow (film)	1981	Hotel Rainbow Guest
Mork and Mindy (TV series)	1981	Orkan Porter
The Sting II (film)	1983	Ringside man taking bets
Star Wars: Episode VI - Return of the Jedi (film)	1983	Ewok
Meatballs Part II	1984	Meathead the Alien
The Dungeonmaster(credited here as 'Felix Cilla	1984	Desert Bandit
The Dukes of Hazzard (TV series)	1985	The Visitor
House	1985	Little Critter
Spaceballs	1987	Dink
Ghostbusters II (film)	1989	Courtroom Spectator
Married... with Children	1990	Alien
Batman Returns (film)	1992	Emperor Penguin
The Legend of Galgameth	1996	Little Galgy
Characterz	2016	Don Cluff
Meet Slate (TV miniseries)	2018	Bitcoin
