= Uncle Fester =

Character in The Addams Family

Uncle Fester Addams
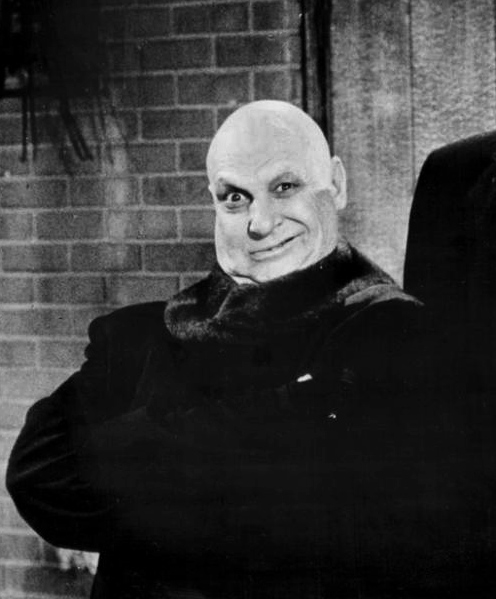
- Jackie Coogan as Uncle Fester
- First appearance: The New Yorker (March 23, 1946)
- Created by: Charles Addams
- Portrayed by: Jackie Coogan (1964–1966, 1977); Christopher Lloyd (1991–1993); Patrick Thomas (1998); Michael Roberds (1998–1999); Kevin Chamberlin (2009–2011); Brad Oscar (2011); Russell Dykstra (2013); Les Dennis (2017); Fred Armisen (2022–present)
- Voiced by: Jackie Coogan (1973); Rip Taylor (1992–1993); Nick Kroll (2019, 2021)

In-universe information
- Alias: Gordon Craven (1991 film)
- Species: Human
- Gender: Male
- Family: Morticia (originally niece, sister-in-law in later media); Gomez (originally nephew-in-law, younger brother in later media); Wednesday (niece, originally great-niece); Pugsley (nephew, originally great-nephew); Wednesday Jr. (great-niece, Halloween with the New Addams Family); Pugsley Jr. (great-nephew, Halloween with the New Addams Family); Pubert Addams (nephew, Addams Family Values); Grandmama Addams (originally sister-in-law, mother in several later media); Granny Frump (originally sister, mother-in-law in later media); Ophelia Frump (originally niece, sister-in-law in The New Addams Family); Itt (cousin); Goody Addams (ancestor; Wednesday)
- Spouses: Debbie Jellinsky Addams (Addams Family Values; deceased)

Uncle Fester Addams is a member of the fictional Addams Family and has been played by numerous actors, beginning with Jackie Coogan in the television series The Addams Family (1964–1966).

== Character ==
Uncle Fester is incorrigible and, except for the good nature of the family and the ignorance of the police, would ordinarily be under lock and key. The complexion, like [that of] Morticia, is dead white, the eyes are pig-like and deeply imbedded, circled unhealthily in black—no teeth and absolutely hairless. He likes to fish but usually employs dynamite or any other unfair means. He keeps falcons on the roof which he uses for hunting. His one costume is a black greatcoat with an enormous collar—summer and winter. He is fat with pudgy little hands and feet.

— Charles Addams

Uncle Fester is a completely hairless, hunched, and barrel-shaped man with dark, sunken eyes and often a deranged smile. He always wears a heavy, full-length greatcoat. Fester was derived from a character drawn by Charles Addams for a series of cartoons featuring a grotesque family, though Addams never gave the characters names. Nevertheless, the character is recognizable in a number of cartoons, both by his appearance (bald, stooping, sunken eyes) and eerie behavior (turning the shower to a special "scalding" setting, feeding his garden plants blood plasma, and releasing an eagle to attack the neighbor's homing pigeons). While he is occasionally seen with the rest of the family, particularly on anthology covers, he is also seen on his own more often than the others. It is sometimes indicated that he lives in a small shack surrounded by a wrought-iron fence.

Fester has a strange ability to generate electricity. In the film The Addams Family, he loses his memory and regains it after being struck by lightning, leading to him gaining that power, though in other adaptations it is never stated how he got that power. He often demonstrates it by putting a light bulb in his mouth, which illuminates, accompanied by a loud, crackling noise. He claims to possess 110 volts of power in one episode of the sitcom, while in another episode he demonstrated his "magnetic" quality by levitating a metal paperweight up to his hand. In the 2022 Netflix series, Wednesday, he shoots lightning directly from his hands and uses it to revive a near-dead Thing. That ability is also believed to give him resistance to lightning, as well as blunt force trauma. When struck directly on the head by a fired cannonball, he appears only mildly dazed, while the cannonball bounces off his head.

Uncle Fester has severe migraines at times but appears to enjoy them. He relieves the migraines by placing his head in a large screw press and tightening it to levels that normal people would not be able to withstand. At times, he puts his head in the screw press simply for enjoyment.

Despite Uncle Fester's menacing look and bizarre behavior, he is known to be gentle and caring. He shows great respect for Gomez and Morticia, and always exhibits love and concern for his niece and nephews, despite their frequent naughtiness.

Uncle Fester smiling, enjoying a movie, while the rest of the audience weeps.

In the original 1960s sitcom, Fester is said to be Morticia's maternal uncle (his name rhymes with that of Morticia's mother, Hester). However, from the 1970s onward, he is Gomez's brother. Despite being very close, he admits to sometimes "despising" Gomez and can be jealous of his relationship with Morticia, often trying to find love, with chaotic consequences. In all adaptations, he is either uncle or grand-uncle to Wednesday and Pugsley. He is known as "Tío Fétido" in Spain, "Tío Lucas" in other Spanish-speaking countries, and "Fétide" in France. In Brazil, he has two names: "Tio Chico" (in most adaptations) and "Tio Funéreo" (Broadway musical and live-action movies).

In the series Wednesday, Fester still possesses his electric powers and a great affection for his niece, but is portrayed as more roguish, appearing at Nevermore Academy looking for a place to hide out from the law, saying that he used to keep Gomez on his toes by dropping "from the ceiling, with a dagger clutched between my teeth".

== Live action TV series ==
In the 1964 television series, Fester (portrayed by Jackie Coogan) is an uncle to Morticia Addams. In one episode, he became perplexed when asked his last name, suggesting he has somehow forgotten it. In several episodes, Fester refers to the Addams lineage as if it were his own, possibly implying some degree of intertwined consanguinity in both their family lines, but the flashbacks in the episodes "Morticia's Romance, Parts 1 and 2," clearly establish him as Morticia's uncle, brother of her mother, Hester Frump, a.k.a. Granny Frump (portrayed by Margaret Hamilton), whose maiden name was similarly unrevealed (indicating a third family, similar to the Addamses and the Frumps). In various episodes, he was a partner in typical sitcom schemes with Gomez, Morticia, or Grandmama Addams, indicating no real preference for any family member over others.

Fester's known ancestry dates back to his Great-Grandfather Blob (not to be confused with Gomez's Cousin Blob, a two-headed ghost), who received the gift of a sacred ruby after he had pried it from the head of a Hindu (to whom it was giving a terrible headache). The ruby remained in the family until Fester unthinkingly used his slingshot to hurl it at a yowling stray cat. "Well, it was the only rock in the house!" he said in his defense.

Per the 1960s sitcom, little is known of Fester's childhood, save that his father (Morticia's maternal grandfather) was an excruciatingly strict man who severely disciplined him, paddling him even when he was good and paying him to stay out of public (Fester considered this to be experienced in "public relations"). He refused to allow Fester to even touch a battleaxe (a treasured toy among people with the Addams's macabre tastes) until he was eight. As an adult, Fester defended his father's strictness, pointing to his own character as proof of its effectiveness: "I didn't become what I am by accident! I had an upbringing like no other!" Sometime prior to Morticia's marriage to Gomez, Fester worked as a newspaper columnist, writing advice for the lovelorn, but left that job because people kept suing him.

Fester has also offered contradictory information about his educational background. In the sitcom's first episode, he notes that he never went to school ("And look how [well] I turned out!"), but he later claims to have failed recess three times. As an adult, Fester took correspondence courses in various subjects, and his educational endeavors occasionally formed an episode's main plot. It may be from one such course that he obtained his fraternity paddle, which he once threatened to use on Wednesday in imitation of his father's punishment style; however, like many an uncle, Fester proved to have more bark than bite in dealing with the children. When he suspects someone of maligning, cheating, or otherwise mistreating anyone in the family, Fester is ever ready with his blunderbuss "Genevieve", eager to "shoot 'em in the back!" However, he is far less eager in meeting a malefactor in a face-to-face duel; he was briefly enthusiastic about a pistol duel with an enemy until he asked, somewhat timidly, "Does he get one too?...Loaded?"

Another prized possession was his cannon, "Old Reliable", which he normally kept in his bedroom. Fester maintained a treehouse in the Addams yard and frequently retreated to his closet to think. After receiving the gift of a motorcycle in the episode "The Addams Family Meets a Beatnik", Fester often drove it through the living room, inevitably crashing in the conservatory (several episodes used identical recycled footage of this scenario). Fester also collects three-dollar bills.

The 1998 live-action series continues the tradition of having Fester (portrayed by Canadian actor Michael Roberds) as Gomez's biological brother, yet between this version and the 1960s series, this is the only visible difference. In furtherance on the original series running gag of Uncle Fester being able to store electricity, one episode has Uncle Fester nearly abducted by aliens so as to be used to power their spaceship; the Aliens leave Uncle Fester behind-but only after "cloning" him for their spaceship journey home.

In the Netflix show Wednesday, Uncle Fester is played by Fred Armisen. He wanted to be like the versions of Fester played by Jackie Coogan and Christopher Lloyd rather than reinventing the character. Every morning, Armisen's head was buzzed smooth, makeup and powder were applied to make him look paler, and dark circles were added around his eyes. The wardrobe covered much of Armisen, so little else needed to be done. Fester helped Wednesday on solving her mysteries of the town of Jericho and Nevermore Academy by revealing to Wednesday that the mystery monster she encountered was a Hyde. Because of his hobby with electricity, he can now project lightning from his own hands. It was also mentioned that Uncle Fester didn't attend Nevermore, but snuck in to visit Gomez on occasion. Wednesday had to use Eugene Ottinger's bee house for Uncle Fester to hide out in after he robbed a bank and is advised by her not to eat any of Eugene's bees.

In December 2023, it was announced that Netflix is developing a Wednesday spin-off series titled Fester that focuses on Uncle Fester.

== Animated TV series ==
In the first animated series by Hanna-Barbera, Jackie Coogan reprised his role as Fester. He also voiced that same character on an episode of The New Scooby-Doo Movies.

In the second animated series by Hanna-Barbera, Fester was voiced by Rip Taylor. In this series, Fester is perhaps the most loving of self-inflicted injury. He would allow other members (usually Lurch) to harm him any way they can, but his greatest fondness was blowing himself up. As a running gag, Fester would never believe Granny's predictions until she predicts something that causes him great harm (or in his case, great joy). Fester also is very fond of the Addamses' next-door neighbor, Norman Normanmayer, a boring person controlling an underwear empire who hates Fester (and the whole Addams family) for his strangeness (on an occasion, Fester comes on a visit through the sewer pipes). Fester seems quite oblivious of the fact that Norman hates him and, possibly due to the Addams family nature, thinks that all the angry and aggressive outbreaks are a sign of affection. This Fester also introduces himself, through his self-made comic books, as "Festerman", a gothic hero with a weakness to chimneys, who gives his flying cape to enemies upon request—so as to fall and would bring villains to their knees...simply by enjoying all the harm they would give him to the point of wearing them out. During this series, he is given a musical-type episode about the "Fester Way", his own, strange way of life. Fester enjoys blowing himself up.

== Films ==
In the 1991 film The Addams Family, Fester (played by Christopher Lloyd) is the long-lost older brother of Gomez Addams. He was believed to have been lost in the Bermuda Triangle for 25 years. A loan shark named Abigail Craven (portrayed by Elizabeth Wilson) conspires to steal the Addams fortune using her son Gordon, who displays an eerie resemblance to the missing Fester. On the night that the Addamses hold an annual séance to contact Fester's spirit, Gordon shows up at their door, posing as Fester. Although he is baffled and horrified by the Addamses at first, Gordon begins to take a liking to the family and their strange ways, feeling more at home with them and increasingly conflicted over Abigail's manipulations. He ultimately rebels against her and saves the family, but sustains a lightning strike while doing so. It is revealed that he actually is Fester; his disappearance left him suffering from amnesia, and Abigail duped him into believing he was her son until the lightning restored his memories. The strike also gives Fester the ability to conduct electricity and make a light bulb glow by putting it in his mouth. In Gomez's childhood home movies, Fester is shown to be hairless as a child (although, as Gordon, he first appears with brown, curly hair, and is later shown shaving his head).

Fester, again played by Lloyd, appears in the 1993 sequel Addams Family Values. He becomes attracted to Debbie Jellinsky (portrayed by Joan Cusack), whom Gomez and Morticia have hired as a nanny to care for their children. Debbie marries Fester with the intent of killing him and inheriting his share of the Addams fortune, but he survives each attempt on his life. After she inadvertently electrocutes herself while trying to kill the entire family, Fester mourns her death. Some time later, Fester becomes attracted to Dementia (portrayed by Carol Hankins), a nanny whom Cousin Itt and his wife have hired to look after their baby.

Fester again appears in the direct-to-video film Addams Family Reunion, portrayed by Patrick Thomas. He is portrayed as a mad scientist reminiscent of old Grade-B horror films. He creates a dog named "Butcher" as a birthday present for Pugsley—a dog that mutates into a hair-devouring brute whenever someone says "good boy." In the end, Butcher attacks Cousin Itt—who is, understandably, quite nervous around him.

Fester is voiced by Nick Kroll in the 2019 animated adaptation of The Addams Family and its sequel where he has a Gilbert Gottfried-type voice. In the first film, he is seen evacuating Gomez and Morticia when an angry mob crashed their wedding. He later shows up to help Gomez train Pugsley for the Saber Mazurka. In the second film, Uncle Fester was used in Wednesday's experiment that involved injecting him with the DNA of her pet octopus Socrates.

== Musical ==
In the musical, Uncle Fester was played by Kevin Chamberlin in the original broadway cast. Chamberlin received a Tony nomination for the role. He was later played by Brad Oscar, Blake Hammond, Russell Dykstra, and Shaun Rice. This incarnation of Fester serves as the musical's narrator and is in love with the moon. The subject of love is apparently his "specialty", and he is able to play the ukulele when he sings a love song to the moon. He also seems to communicate with the ancestors throughout the show more than the other characters.

== Video games ==
Uncle Fester has appeared in several Addams Family video games as a playable character. He is the protagonist of Fester's Quest, a NES game, and the main playable character in the Addams Family Values SNES game. He is also the main character in "Electrifying" arcade machine, where simulated "electrical shocks" are passed through the player as they hold on to two handles.

== Relationships ==
=== Family tree ===
Addams family tree

Grandmama (Note: In the Broadway musical The Addams Family, Morticia refers to Grandmama as Gomez and Uncle Fester's mother, to which Gomez reacts with surprise and says that he had thought she was Morticia's mother. Morticia later says that Grandmama "may not even be part of this family", referencing Grandmama's ever-changing relation to the family.)
Debbie Jellinsky (Note: Established in the 1993 film Addams Family Values.)	Uncle Fester	Cousin Itt	Margaret Alford	Tully Alford
Mal Beineke (Note: Established in the Broadway musical The Addams Family.)	Alice Beineke	Gomez Addams	Morticia Addams (née Frump)	Rupert Styx (Note: Established in the 1964 episode "Halloween with the Addams Family".)
Lucas Beineke	Wednesday Addams	Pugsley Addams	Pubert Addams
Wednesday Addams Jr. (Note: Established in the 1977 film Halloween with the New Addams Family.)	Pugsley Addams Jr.
