= Lisa Loring =

American actress (1958–2023)

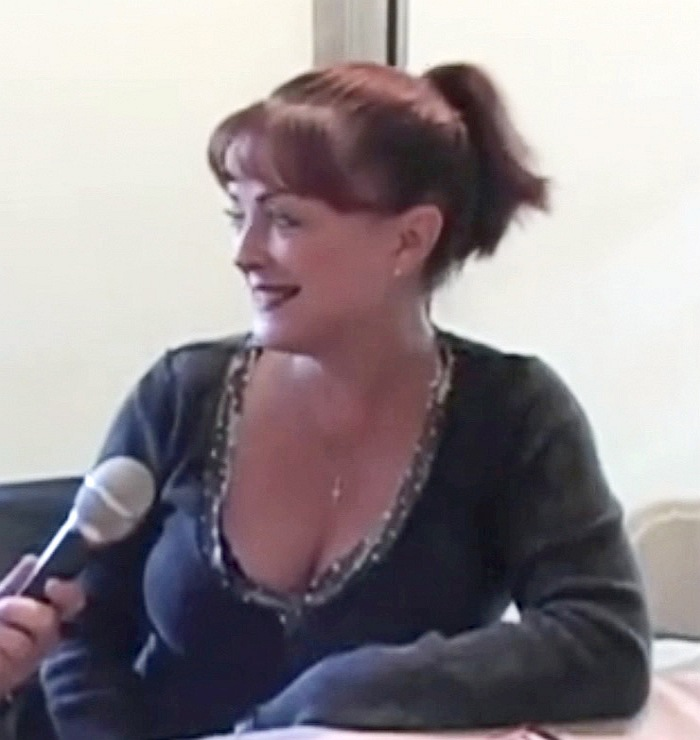
- Loring interviewed in 2009 for Count Gore de Vol
- Born: Lisa Ann DeCinces; February 16, 1958; Kwajalein Atoll, Trust Territory of the Pacific Islands (now Marshall Islands)
- Died: January 28, 2023 (aged 64); Burbank, California, U.S.
- Resting place: Hollywood Forever Cemetery
- Years active: 1964–2002
- Known for: Wednesday Addams on The Addams Family
- Spouses: Farrell Foumberg (m. 1973; div. 1974) Doug Stevenson (m. 1981; div. 1983) Jerry Butler (m. 1987; div. 1992) Graham Rich (m. 2003; div. 2014)
- Children: 2

Lisa Loring (born Lisa Ann DeCinces; February 16, 1958 – January 28, 2023) was an American actress. She was best known for her work as a child actress from age six playing Wednesday Addams on the 1964–1966 sitcom The Addams Family.

== Early life and career ==
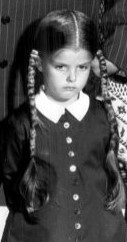
6-year-old Loring as Wednesday Addams in 1964

Loring was born on Kwajalein Atoll, Marshall Islands, a United Nations Trust Territory at the time, which had been administered by the United States. Her parents, Judith Ann (Callies) and James P. DeCinces, both served in the United States Navy, and divorced shortly after her birth. She grew up in Hawaii and later moved to Los Angeles with her mother. She began modeling at age three and appeared in an episode of Dr. Kildare, which aired in 1964. Her mother died of alcoholism in 1974 at age 34.

Loring was best known for her role portraying Wednesday Addams in the sitcom The Addams Family (1964–1966). She was one of the longer-surviving members of the show's main cast. She later reprised the role for the TV movie Halloween with the New Addams Family which aired in October 1977. In 1966, she joined the cast of the ABC sitcom The Pruitts of Southampton. From 1980 to 1983, she played the character Cricket Montgomery on the CBS soap opera As the World Turns. She also appeared in three B-grade slasher films: Blood Frenzy and Savage Harbor (1987); and Iced (1988).

== Personal life ==
Loring married Farrell Foumberg in 1973 when she was 15, and had a daughter. The marriage ended a year later. Loring married her second husband, actor Doug Stevenson, in 1981. He was a contract performer on another CBS/Procter & Gamble soap opera, Search for Tomorrow. Loring had a second daughter with Stevenson and their marriage ended in 1983.

In 1987, Loring married adult film actor Jerry Butler. They met on the set of the 1987 adult film Traci's Big Trick, on which Loring worked as a make-up artist and uncredited writer. In the ensuing years of their marriage, Loring voiced her dissatisfaction with Butler's continued involvement in pornography, and eventually Butler began to secretly participate in porn shoots without her knowledge. In an interview with Dateline NBC in the 1990s, Butler described himself as "addicted to the lifestyle,” ashamed of his clandestine behavior and its effect on his marriage. The couple later appeared on the Sally Jessy Raphael Show, again discussing the damage Butler's porn career was causing to their marriage. Butler and Loring divorced in 1992, which was also the year he began to exit the hardcore pornography industry, and, by choice, virtually disappeared from the public eye for many years.

Loring was married for a fourth time in 2003 to Graham Rich. The couple separated in 2008 and divorced in 2014.

== Death ==
Loring died of a stroke, caused by hypertension, at Providence Saint Joseph Medical Center in Burbank, California, on January 28, 2023, at age 64. She was cremated, and three years after her death her ashes were interred at Hollywood Forever Cemetery.
