= Gomez Addams =

Character of The Addams Family

- The Addams Family character
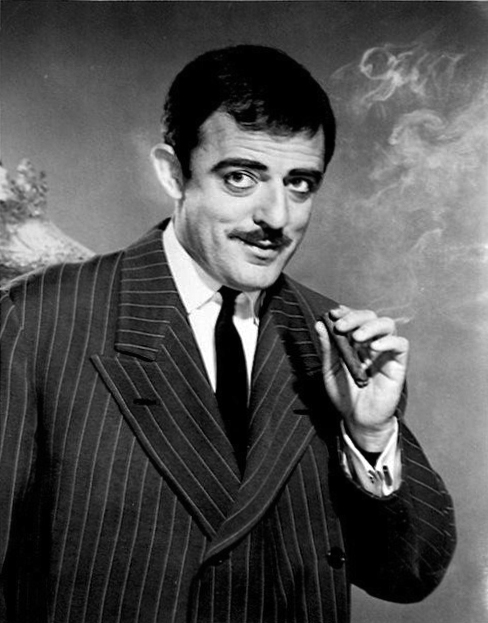
- John Astin as Gomez in The Addams Family television series
- First appearance: The New Yorker (1942)
- Created by: Charles Addams
- Portrayed by: John Astin (1964–1966, 1977); Raul Julia (1991–1993); Tim Curry (1998); Glenn Taranto (1998); Nathan Lane (2010); Roger Rees (2010); Douglas Sills (2011); Cameron Blakely (2017); Luis Guzmán (2022–present)
- Voiced by: John Astin (1972, 1992–1993); Lennie Weinrib (1973); Oscar Isaac (2019, 2021)

In-universe information
- Nicknames: Bubele (by Morticia; Yiddish for "darling")
- Species: Human
- Gender: Male
- Occupation: Lawyer, business tycoon, playboy
- Family: Fester (originally uncle-in-law in the original TV series, older brother in recent movies and TV series); Grandmama (mother); Hester Frump (mother-in-law); Ophelia Frump (sister-in-law); Cousin Itt (cousin); Margaret Addams (Cousin Itt's wife); What Addams(Cousin Itt's son); Cosimo Addams (brother); Pancho Addams (brother, Halloween with the New Addams Family); Debbie Jellinsky-Addams (sister-in-law, Addams Family Values; deceased); Vasco Addams (paternal uncle); Goody Addams (ancestor)
- Spouse: Morticia (wife)
- Children: Wednesday (daughter); Pugsley (older son); Pubert (younger son, Addams Family Values); Wednesday Jr. (younger daughter, Halloween with the New Addams Family); Pugsley Jr. (youngest son, Halloween with the New Addams Family)
- Nationality: American

Gomez Addams is the patriarch of the fictional Addams Family, created by cartoonist Charles Addams for The New Yorker magazine in the 1940s and subsequently portrayed on television, in film, and on the stage.

== Cartoons ==
"Husband of Morticia (if indeed they are married at all), a crafty schemer, but also a jolly man in his own way. Tries hard to be father and teacher to the children, though sometimes misguided— we can depend on Morticia to straighten him out. Sentimental and often puckish—optimistic, he is full of enthusiasm for his dreadful plots. He is dressed in a tight double-breasted striped suit and is sometimes seen in a rather formal dressing gown. The only one who smokes—though Pugsley can be allowed an occasional cigar." — Charles Addams

In Charles Addams's original cartoons, Gomez was the nameless patriarch of the family. He had a somewhat grotesque appearance, with a tubby body, a snub nose, a crooked tooth, and a receding chin. He was often depicted reading in the den or lounging on the windowsill.

== Origin of the name ==
In the Charles Addams cartoons, Gomez—as with all of the members of the family—had no given name. When The Addams Family television series was being developed, Charles Addams suggested naming the character either Repelli or Gomez. Addams left the final choice up to portrayer John Astin, who chose Gomez.

Because "Gómez" is usually a surname in Spanish, the character's name was changed to "Homero" ("Homer") in Latin American Spanish adaptations, though in European Spanish adaptations, he is still called Gómez.

== Personality ==
Like the other members of the family, Gomez's personality became largely codified by the television series. He is depicted as being of Castilian extraction and Spanish ancestry, which was first brought up in "Art and the Addams Family" on December 18, 1964; in the episode, Gomez says his "ancestral land" is Spain and Morticia refers to him as a "mad Castilian."

John Astin had long sessions with Addams and series producer David Levy, who gave him free rein in developing the character. Enlarging on Addams's description of Gomez as a Latin lover type, Astin suggested the eye-rolling, pencil moustache, and ardent devotion to Morticia. Whenever he hears Morticia speak French, Gomez reacts with a frenzied display of affection by repeatedly kissing her on the arm.

In the Addams cartoons and the television shows, Gomez wore a necktie to his chalk-stripe suit, though in the films, Gomez wears a bow tie and a wide variety of extravagant clothing. He spends $1000 per month on cigars, and he is an accomplished juggler and knife thrower. He loves crashing toy trains and diving for crabs on Halloween. When he wishes to know the time, he will pull a pocket watch from the breast pocket of his jacket (the chain is attached to the lapel) while simultaneously checking a wristwatch.

Gomez is an athletic, acrobatic, and eccentric multibillionaire. Though an extremely successful businessman, having acquired much of his wealth through inheritance and investments, he has little regard for money and will casually spend thousands of dollars on any whimsical endeavor. Gomez's investments are guided more by whimsy than strategy, yet rarely fail him. Gomez owns businesses around the world, including a swamp, bought for "scenic value", a crocodile farm, a buzzard farm, a salt mine, a tombstone factory, a uranium mine, and many others. In Forbes 2007 "Fictional 15" list of the richest fictional characters, he was ranked number 12 with a net worth of $2.5 billion.

As a young man, Gomez was, per flashback in "Morticia's Romance", a perennially sickly youth, gaining perfect health only after meeting Morticia. He nevertheless studied law (voted "Most Likely Never to Pass the Bar") and is quite proud his law class voted him "Least Likely to Succeed"; and although he rarely practices, he takes an absurd delight in losing cases, boasting of having put many criminals behind bars while acting as their defense attorney, claiming that he "never sent an innocent man to jail"; this is somewhat contradicted in the episode "The Addams Family Goes to Court," which noted that while Gomez has never won a case, he has never lost one either. This backstory, while not mentioned directly, is recalled in The Addams Family (1991), when Gomez announces he will serve as his own attorney, only to lose the case. In The New Addams Family, Gomez had also studied medicine.

Gomez has offered contradictory views on work; in one episode, he claims that although his family was wealthy even in his childhood, he nonetheless performed odd jobs and "scrimped and saved [his] kopeks," which he considered character building. When his son Pugsley decided to find a job, however, Gomez was horrified, claiming, "No Addams has worked in 300 years!" In the 1991 animated series, Gomez deliberately tried to fail at something, anything, only to realize in the end of the episode that he is only a failure in failure. This is additionally contradicted in "New Neighbors Meet the Addams Family" (season one, episode 9, 1964). He specifically states that Thing always beats him at bridge.

== Portrayals ==
Raul Julia (left) as Gomez in the 1991 live-action film

In the 1960s television series, Gomez was portrayed by John Astin. Astin also voiced the character in an episode of The New Scooby-Doo Movies, which featured the family. In the first animated series by Hanna-Barbera, Gomez was voiced by Lennie Weinrib. In the second animated series, also by Hanna-Barbera, Gomez's voice was again performed by John Astin.

Gomez was played by Raul Julia in The Addams Family (1991) and Addams Family Values (1993). After Julia died in 1994, Tim Curry took up the role in the television film Addams Family Reunion in 1998, and in 1999, Gomez was played by Glenn Taranto in the TV series The New Addams Family, where he returned to the madcap attitude of his original 1960s incarnation with Astin guest-starring as Gomez's grandfather. In the Broadway musical, Gomez was initially played by Nathan Lane and later by Roger Rees. In the UK tour of The Addams Family musical in 2017, Gomez was portrayed by Cameron Blakely, who was set to reprise his role in 2021. The films differ from the television series in several ways, most significantly that Fester is Gomez's brother (in the television show, he was Morticia's uncle). The Addams Family notes that Gomez's parents were murdered by an angry mob, though in one scene in the sequel, when Gomez catches Fester with a pornographic magazine, they both look at the centerfold (unseen by the viewer) and fondly say "Mom". In Addams Family Values, Gomez and Morticia have a third child named Pubert, a seemingly indestructible baby with a thin, black moustache like his father.

Oscar Isaac voiced Gomez in the 2019 animated adaptation of The Addams Family and its 2021 sequel. In the latter film, it is revealed that Gomez wears a wig made of Sasquatch fur due to losing his original hair in a napalm accident.

Luis Guzmán portrays Gomez in Netflix series Wednesday. Both he and Morticia first met at Nevermore Academy, a boarding school for supernatural people (also known as "Outcasts"). It is revealed in flashbacks that he and Morticia were involved in the death of a local teenage boy named Garrett Gates, who tried to kill Gomez in a blind rage, due to Gates' own infatuation with Morticia. Sheriff Galpin still believes that Gomez committed the murder and holds a grudge against the Addams' bloodline. After Gomez is re-arrested for Gates' murder, Morticia and Wednesday exhume Gates' body and find evidence that Gates died of accidental nightshade poisoning, clearing Gomez. In season 2, it is revealed that Gomez previously had the power to produce strong electrical charges, as his brother Fester and son Pugsley do, but this power was taken from him by a classmate, Isaac Night, in an experiment which nearly killed Gomez.

== Relationships ==
=== Family tree ===
Addams family tree

Grandmama (Note: In the Broadway musical The Addams Family, Morticia refers to Grandmama as Gomez and Uncle Fester's mother, to which Gomez reacts with surprise and says that he had thought she was Morticia's mother. Morticia later says that Grandmama "may not even be part of this family", referencing Grandmama's ever-changing relation to the family.)
Debbie Jellinsky (Note: Established in the 1993 film Addams Family Values.)	Uncle Fester	Cousin Itt	Margaret Alford	Tully Alford
Mal Beineke (Note: Established in the Broadway musical The Addams Family.)	Alice Beineke	Gomez Addams	Morticia Addams (née Frump)	Rupert Styx (Note: Established in the 1964 episode "Halloween with the Addams Family".)
Lucas Beineke	Wednesday Addams	Pugsley Addams	Pubert Addams
Wednesday Addams Jr. (Note: Established in the 1977 film Halloween with the New Addams Family.)	Pugsley Addams Jr.
