= Wednesday Addams =

Fictional character from The Addams Family

- The Addams Family character
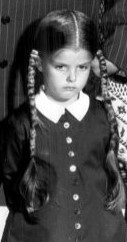
- Lisa Loring as Wednesday in The Addams Family original television series
- First appearance: The New Yorker (August 26, 1944)
- Created by: Charles Addams
- Portrayed by: Lisa Loring (1964–1966, 1977); Christina Ricci (1991, 1993); Nicole Fugere (1998, 1998–1999); Krysta Rodriguez (2009–2011); Rachel Potter (2011); Jenna Ortega (2022–present)
- Voiced by: Cindy Henderson (1972, 1973); Debi Derryberry (1992–1993); Chloë Grace Moretz (2019, 2021)
- Hair color: Black
- Age: 8 (in the 1964 TV series); 12-14 (in later adaptations)

In-universe information
- Full name: Wednesday Friday Addams (Note: Wednesday after Morticia's favourite poem which has the line "Wednesday's child is full of woe", Friday because Wednesday was born on Friday the 13th, and Addams because it is the family's surname.)
- Gender: Female
- Family: Gomez (father) Morticia (mother) Pugsley (brother) Pubert Addams (youngest brother, Addams Family Values) Wednesday Jr. (younger sister, Halloween with the New Addams Family) Pugsley Jr. (youngest brother, Halloween with the New Addams Family) Fester (originally maternal great-uncle in the 1964 series, paternal uncle from then on) Pancho (paternal uncle, Halloween with the New Addams Family) Debbie Jellinsky Addams (paternal aunt via marriage to Fester, Addams Family Values; deceased) Vasco Addams (father's paternal uncle) Cousin Itt (father's cousin) Margaret Addams (Cousin Itt's wife) What Addams (Cousin Itt and Margaret Addams's son) Grandmama Addams (paternal grandmother) Hester Frump (maternal grandmother) Ophelia Frump (maternal aunt) Goody Addams (ancestor; Wednesday)

Wednesday Friday Addams is a character from the Addams Family multimedia franchise created by American cartoonist Charles Addams. She is typically portrayed as a morbid and emotionally reserved child that is fascinated by the macabre, identified by her pale skin and black pigtails.

Wednesday has been portrayed by several actresses in various films and television series, including Lisa Loring in the television series The Addams Family (1964–1966) and in the television film Halloween with the New Addams Family (1977); Christina Ricci in the feature films The Addams Family (1991) and Addams Family Values (1993); Nicole Fugere in the direct-to-video film Addams Family Reunion (1998) and in the television series The New Addams Family (1998–1999); and Jenna Ortega in the streaming television series Wednesday (2022–).

== Origin ==
Addams Family members were unnamed in The New Yorker cartoons that first appeared in 1938. The character that would later be known as Wednesday Addams first appeared in the August 26, 1944, issue of The New Yorker in an illustration captioned, "Well, don't come whining to me. Go tell him you'll poison him right back." When the characters were adapted for the 1964 television series, Charles Addams named Wednesday based on the Monday's Child nursery rhyme line: "Wednesday's child is full of woe." Actress and poetess Joan Blake, an acquaintance of Charles Addams, offered the idea for the name. Wednesday is the only daughter of Gomez and Morticia Addams, and the sister of Pugsley Addams. Earlier adaptations depict her as the younger sibling, while later adaptations depict Wednesday as the elder Addams child.

== Appearance and personality ==
Wednesday Addams is a young girl (in the original series, she is about 6, in the first original movie she is perhaps 8 to 10 years old, and about 13 in its sequel, as seems to be the case in the animated films; in the Netflix series she is 15 and 16) who is obsessed with death and is described as brilliant, with a penchant for doing odd scientific experiments. Wednesday does most of her experiments on her brother Pugsley Addams for "fun" or for punishment. Wednesday has sometimes been shown as caring about Pugsley, but has also often been shown actively carrying out his execution; not that Pugsley typically seems to mind. She enjoys raising spiders and researching the Bermuda Triangle. She has a tendency to startle people due to her gothic appearance and macabre interests.

Wednesday's most notable physical features are her pale skin and her long, dark braided pigtails. In the animated series, she has a tattoo on her upper left arm. It depicts a heart with "Woe" written on a ribbon across it. She seldom expresses her emotions, but is generally bitter, often sporting a withering stare and rarely breaking eye contact. Wednesday usually wears a black dress with a white collar, black stockings, and black shoes. In the original television series, her middle name is "Friday". This is retained in the Netflix series which further clarifies that this is because she was born on Friday the 13th.

In the 1960s series, she is a far more sweet-natured child than the morose and spooky little girl of the original comics, serving as something of a foil to the more legitimately bizarre personas of her parents and brother; although her favorite hobby is raising spiders, she is also a ballerina. She is stated to be six years old in the television series' pilot episode. Wednesday's favorite toy is her Marie Antoinette doll, which her brother guillotines (at her request). She also paints pictures (including a picture of trees with human heads) and writes a poem dedicated to her favorite pet spider, Homer. Wednesday is deceptively strong; she is able to bring her father down with a judo hold. Although she is obsessed with death and the macabre, and enjoys being miserable, she is also good-natured, smiles and dances often, and has a slight distaste for torture. She is called "Miércoles Addams" in Spain (Literal translation for Wednesday Addams), "Merlina Addams" in Latin-American Spanish speaking countries, and "Wandinha" (Meaning "Little Wanda") in Brazilian Portuguese.

In the 1991 film, Wednesday is depicted as having a significantly darker personality than that of the 1960s television series, and a far more malevolent one than that of the original comics. She harbours openly sadistic tendencies, and has a deeply morbid, stoic, and detachedly acerbic personality. She is shown to have a deep fascination with the Bermuda Triangle (a detail which several subsequent incarnations of the character share) amongst other such unusual interests, and a deep admiration for her late great-aunt, Calpurnia Addams, who was burned as a witch in 1706 after she'd danced naked through the streets and having "enslaved a minister". In the 1993 sequel, she was expanded to be even more malicious still; burying a live cat for no discernable reason, trying to execute her baby brother, Pubert, by guillotine, burning down Camp Chippewa (along with the camp's counsellors), and finally scaring her would-be love-interest, Joel.

In the animated series, and in the Canadian television series The New Addams Family from the 1990s, Wednesday's appearance is based upon that of the films and, (as with most later iterations of the character) she retains her more malevolent personality, love of torture, and fascination with the mad and macabre; she is portrayed as having her parents' consent to tie Pugsley to a chair and torture him with a branding iron and ice pick. In the 1990s animated series, no one is allowed to touch Wednesday's pigtails.

In The Addams Family Broadway musical, Wednesday is 18 years old, has short hair rather than the long braids in her other appearances and, uniquely among latter versions of the character, her darker qualities and sociopathic traits have been toned down, bearing little resemblance to other versions of the character. She is shown to be in love with (and even revealed to be engaged to) Lucas Beineke. In the musical, Wednesday is also explicitly stated to be older than Pugsley.

In the web series Adult Wednesday Addams, Wednesday once more has the dark, sociopathic and sadistic nature of the 1991 and 1993 films (although, as with most versions of the character, any particularly brutal or horrific acts are only ever implied and off-camera) and her long braids, connecting with the events and the depiction of the films and the original cartoons. This Wednesday deals with being an adult after moving out of her family home.

In the 2019 animated version of the same title, Wednesday again retains her stoic nature and sadistic tendencies, which include trying to bury Pugsley and tormenting a bully at school. However, despite her gothic appearance and strange demeanour, she's also bored with her macabre and sheltered life, wanting to see the world despite Morticia's objections. This leads to her befriending Parker Needler and the two taking on several of each other's traits, with Wednesday at one point wearing colorful clothes – before ultimately deciding she prefers dressing in darker clothes anyway. In the 2021 sequel, her love of science experiments is again revived. She also often feels disconnected from the rest of her family for her differences, later realizing that being different is "the most Addams-y thing to be" and growing to love her differences, and has a pet squid named Socrates. Her braided pigtails end in nooses in the first film, and weights in the second.

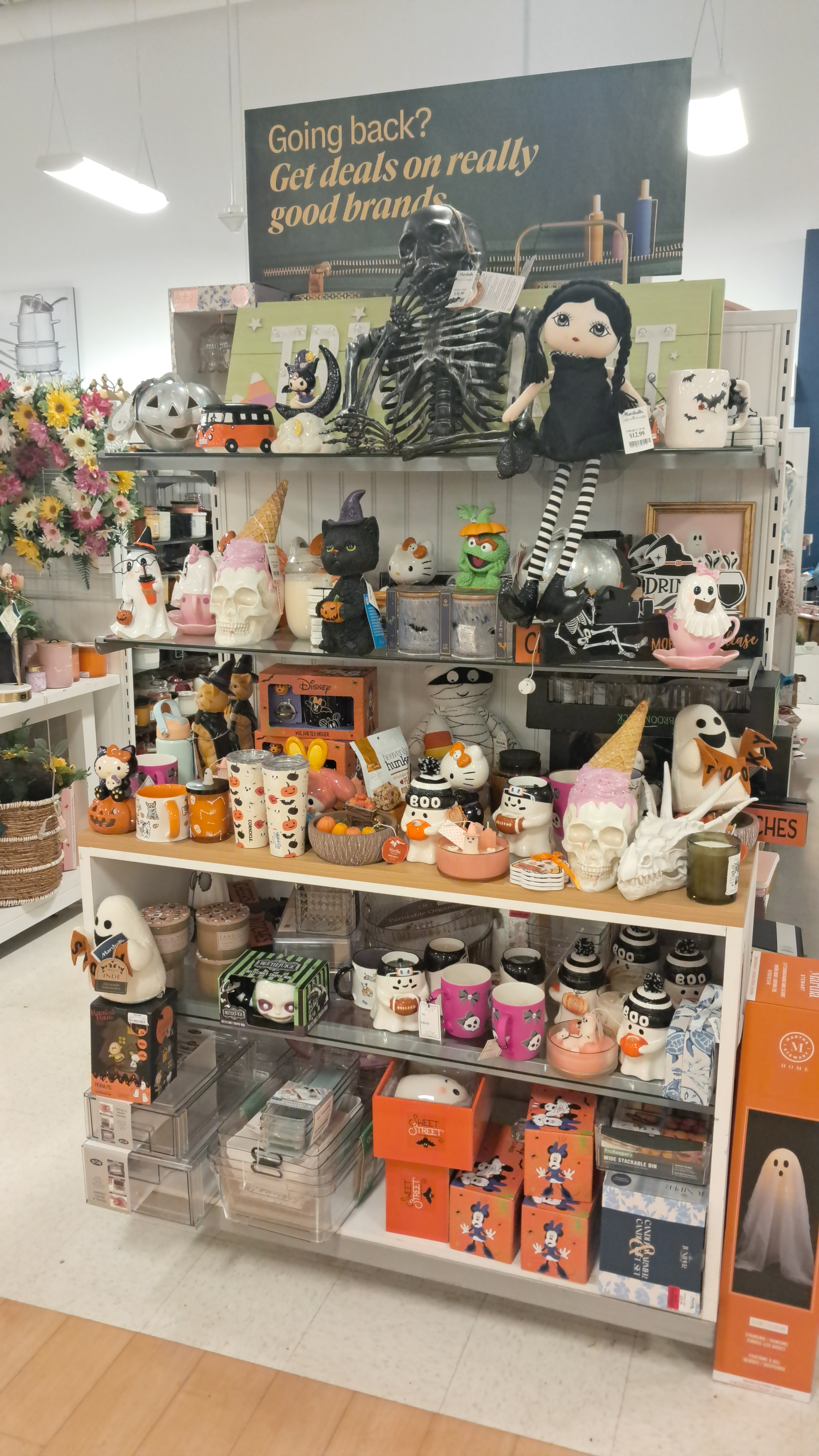
A Wednesday Addams shelf-sitting doll among Halloween decorations at Marshalls.

In the Netflix series Wednesday, the titular character dabbles in detective work and writes gothic mystery novels. She tries to publish her works, but they are seen as far too shocking and macabre. Once again, Wednesday retains the more stoic and malevolent attributes established in the original films of the 1990s, but is shown to be notably softer, and opens up over the course of the series, finding a best friend; the colorfully-clad werewolf Enid, becoming entangled in something of a love triangle, and displaying more overtly affectionate care for her brother, Pugsley. The Wednesday of the series also has psychic abilities, and can foresee important things in a person's past or future through touch. Because of her abilities, Wednesday is termed a "Raven" as her visions are largely negative, which causes her to distance herself from the others, thinking she cannot trust them, though this changes over the course of the first season. Her mother, whom Wednesday has a strained relationship with in the show, possesses similar psychic abilities, telling Wednesday that their visions are based on their own attitude, with Morticia calling herself a "Dove" since her visions are usually comparatively positive. Wednesday also shares a similar appearance to her distant ancestor, Goody Addams, who was a "witch of great strength" and had the same precognitive powers. Beyond her aforementioned interests in writing and investigation, some of Wednesday's other hobbies in the series include playing the cello and, much as in the films, fencing. She is also shown to speak German, Italian and Tagalog. Wednesday also demonstrates a physical allergic reaction to any color other than black, white, or gray (which is to say, any color at all), breaking out in hives once exposed to it.

== Portrayals ==
Christina Ricci in the film The Addams Family (1991)

Wednesday has been portrayed by many actresses in film, television, and on stage:

- Lisa Loring: the television series The Addams Family (1964–1966), the television film Halloween with the New Addams Family (1977),
- Cindy Henderson (voice): the animated television series The New Scooby-Doo Movies (Wednesday Is Missing; 1972), the animated television series The Addams Family (1973),
- Noelle Von Sonn: the pilot of the television show The Addams Family Fun House (1973),
- Christina Ricci: the feature films The Addams Family (1991) and Addams Family Values (1993),
- Debi Derryberry (voice): the animated television series The Addams Family (1992–1993),
- Nicole Fugere: the direct-to-video film Addams Family Reunion (1998), the television series The New Addams Family (1998–1999),
- Krysta Rodriguez: the Broadway musical The Addams Family: A New Musical (2009–2011), original cast,
- Rachel Potter: the Broadway musical The Addams Family: A New Musical (2011), Broadway replacement,
- Cortney Wolfson: the first US tour of the Broadway musical The Addams Family: A New Musical (2011–2012),
- Melissa Hunter: the web series Adult Wednesday Addams (2013–2015),
- Carrie Hope Fletcher: the first UK tour of the Broadway musical The Addams Family: A New Musical (2017),
- Chloë Grace Moretz (voice): the animated feature films The Addams Family (2019) and The Addams Family 2 (2021),
- Jenna Ortega: the streaming television series Wednesday (2022);
- Karina Varadi: the streaming television series Wednesday (2022; a young Wednesday)
- Emily Ring: the streaming television series Wednesday (2025; a young Wednesday).
- Emma Myers: the streaming television series Wednesday (2025; season 2 episode 6)

Wednesday is played by Lisa Loring in the original television series and is far less malevolent than later iterations of the character. In the first animated series from Hanna-Barbera, her voice was provided by Cindy Henderson. Henderson voiced that same character in an episode of The New Scooby-Doo Movies. In the second animated series from Hanna-Barbera, she is voiced by Debi Derryberry.

In the 1977 television holiday-themed special, Halloween with the New Addams Family, Lisa Loring plays a grown-up Wednesday, who mostly entertains their party guests with her flute, and can hear and understand coded help messages by bound-up members of the family, and dispatch help to free them. In the time interval between the original TV series and this television movie, her parents had two more children who look just like the original Pugsley and Wednesday, and they appropriately are called Wednesday Jr and Pugsley Jr, respectively.

The Addams Family (1991) and its sequel Addams Family Values (1993) depict a gloomier Wednesday, more akin to the original comics than the version originated in the 1960s television series. However, the films further develop Wednesday's character, depicting her as a considerably more macabre and sinister individual than the comics had previously established.

In both films, Wednesday is played by Christina Ricci. Wednesday's personality is markedly severe, with a sharp deadpan wit, ominous demeanour, sociopathic overtones, and an intense preoccupation with her desire to severely harm (or even kill) her two brothers, Pugsley and, later, Pubert. All of this, of course, is played to comedic effect, with much of the humour of the character being derived from the sheer absurdity of such a young girl possessing so grave a demeanour, engaging in so many horrific and disturbing pursuits, and all while being arguably the most immoral member of an already considerably amoral family. Consequently, much of Wednesday's personality, as established in the 1991 and 1993 films, has become so synonymous with the character that virtually every iteration since has subsequently been modelled on Ricci's depiction.

In the sequel Addams Family Values (1993), Wednesday and Pugsley are sent against their will to a summer camp for "privileged young adults" called Camp Chippewa. Here they meet Joel Glicker (played by David Krumholtz)—a neurotic, allergy-ridden wallflower camper with an overbearing mother— who quickly develops an infatuation with Wednesday. Unable to leave, Wednesday does her best to avoid participating in the many camp activities being forced upon her - most notably, her camp counselors' Gary and Becky's, incessant attempts to compel her to act in Gary's culturally tone-deaf musical production of the first Thanksgiving. However, despite their efforts to escape, Pugsley, Wednesday, and Joel are ultimately caught, locked in the "Harmony Hut", and forced to watch a seemingly endless progression of upbeat family films to reconditon them out of their antisocial behavior. On finally being released from the hut, Wednesday feigns a cheery new demeanour to fool her captors and finally agrees to play the role of Pocahontas in Gary's play (though her smile mostly ends up frightening the other campers; particularly newfound nemesis - and the star of Gary's horrendous play - Amanda). During the play, Wednesday leads the other social outcasts of the camp—whom the counselors have also all cast in the roles of Native Americans—in a revolt that ultimately results in the capture of Gary, Becky, and Amanda, whom Wednesday has bound, before striking a match and leaving the camp in flames behind her, Pugsley and Joel in tow. Before she heads back for home, Wednesday shares a kiss with Joel, seemingly reciprocating his affections. However, in the midst of a later conversation in which Joel attempts to discuss his feelings with her, and the possibility of a future romantic relationship between them, the tender moment (and the film) is abruptly ended when Wednesday quite literally scares him to death.

Wednesday is portrayed by Nicole Fugere in the straight-to-video movie Addams Family Reunion and Fox Family Channel's television series The New Addams Family, which were both produced in 1998.

Zoe Richardson appeared at the Birmingham Hippodrome as Wednesday Addams in a musical adaptation of The Addams Family on Ice in November 2007.

The Addams Family musical debuted on Broadway in April 2010, with Krysta Rodriguez playing Wednesday. The character is now 18 years old, has "become a woman", and no longer sports her signature pigtails. In March 2011, Krysta Rodriguez was replaced with Rachel Potter as Wednesday in the Broadway cast. The production began its first national tour in September 2011, with Cortney Wolfson cast in the role of Wednesday Addams.

The web series Adult Wednesday Addams (2013–2015) gained media attention with the third episode of Season 2 in which Wednesday punished a pair of catcallers. While this behavior gained attention from early fans, The Tee & Charles Addams Foundation, copyright owners of The Addams Family, flagged the series for copyright violation resulting in the series being temporarily pulled from YouTube, however as of 2016 the series has been reinstated.

Chloë Grace Moretz voices Wednesday in the 2019 animated movie and in the sequel, which was released on October 1, 2021. The whole family is mostly designed to resemble the initial cartoon depictions, with added details; for instance, Wednesday's hair braids end in nooses in the first film, and weights in the second.

Jenna Ortega portrays a teenaged iteration of Wednesday in the 2022 Netflix series of the same name. Largely modelled on the Wednesday of the 1991 original film and its sequel, this version of the character retains much of the caustic wit, precociousness, cold hostility, contemptuousness, and deadpan delivery originated in Ricci's portrayal. However, unlike previous incarnations, this Wednesday is also shown to possess supernatural abilities; with the series as a whole taking on more conventional fantasy elements than previous adaptations. Uniquely, Wednesday's family is also largely absent for much of the series, and in place of the close-knit familial bonds typical of the otherwise asocial character, instead interpersonal focus is placed upon newly formed friendships and a burgeoning love triangle. Ortega's performance in the series received acclaim from critics; she was nominated for a Golden Globe Award for Best Actress – Television Series Musical or Comedy and for an Emmy Award for Outstanding Lead Actress in a Comedy Series. The series aired two seasons and was renewed for a third.

== Family tree ==
Addams family tree

Grandmama (Note: In the Broadway musical The Addams Family, Morticia refers to Grandmama as Gomez and Uncle Fester's mother, to which Gomez reacts with surprise and says that he had thought she was Morticia's mother. Morticia later says that Grandmama "may not even be part of this family", referencing Grandmama's ever-changing relation to the family.)
Debbie Jellinsky (Note: Established in the 1993 film Addams Family Values.)	Uncle Fester	Cousin Itt	Margaret Alford	Tully Alford
Mal Beineke (Note: Established in the Broadway musical The Addams Family.)	Alice Beineke	Gomez Addams	Morticia Addams (née Frump)	Rupert Styx (Note: Established in the 1964 episode "Halloween with the Addams Family".)
Lucas Beineke	Wednesday Addams	Pugsley Addams	Pubert Addams
Wednesday Addams Jr. (Note: Established in the 1977 film Halloween with the New Addams Family.)	Pugsley Addams Jr.

== See also ==
- Wednesday (given name)
