= Cousin Itt =

Fictional character in the television series The Addams Family

- The Addams Family character
- Cousin Itt in The Addams Family (1965)
- First appearance: "Cousin Itt Visits the Addams Family" (1965)
- Created by: David Levy; Charles Addams
- Portrayed by: Felix Silla (1964–1966, 1977); Roger Arroyo (1965, 1966); John Franklin (1991–1993); David Mylrea (1998–1999); Phil Fondacaro (1998)
- Voiced by: Tony Magro (1964–1966); John Stephenson (1972–1973); Pat Fraley (1992–1993); Paul Dobson (1998–1999); Snoop Dogg (2019, 2021)

Cousin Itt is a fictional character in the Addams Family television and film series. He was developed specifically for the 1964 television series and is a regular supporting character in subsequent motion-picture, television and stage adaptations.

== Character background ==
Cousin Itt is a diminutive, hirsute being, his visible form composed entirely of floor-length hair. He is often attired in a bowler hat and round sunglasses, and speaks in a high-pitched gibberish that is understood only by his family. Although the character was developed at the suggestion of producer David Levy for the upcoming live-action television series, Charles Addams actually introduced the creature to the public before the show's 1964 debut. The character first appeared in a single-panel sketch in the October 12, 1963 issue of The New Yorker, which depicted the hair-covered figure answering the telephone with the caption, "This is It speaking." [sic] Illustrations of the character in family-portrait artwork followed later. He drives a Messerschmitt Kabinenroller.

== Appearances ==
=== Television ===
Cousin Itt is introduced in the television series as the cousin of family patriarch Gomez Addams. He is an occasional guest in the Addams home, entering and exiting through the chimney, though he also has his own quarters which are furnished in proportion to his size. He vainly attempts a multitude of professions such as an actor, a singer, a marriage counselor, and a zoo curator, while his physical appearance is the subject of one episode in which he begins to lose his hair.

Cousin Itt appeared in 19 total episodes of the original series and was played by Felix Silla, except for two appearances in which he was played by Roger Arroyo. Silla attended a casting call in Los Angeles and was given the role on the spot without having to audition. The character's heavy costume was first constructed with real hair but later changed to a fire-retardant synthetic, as smoking was common on-set and the real hair was therefore a fire hazard. Silla's instructions were simply to walk around on the set, as Itt's voice (provided by sound engineer Tony Magro) was dubbed in post-production, but he often had difficulty seeing through the costume.

The character appears with the other family members in a September 23, 1972 crossover episode of The New Scooby-Doo Movies, titled "Wednesday Is Missing". His vocal effects were provided by John Stephenson, who returned to the role in the 1973 Hanna-Barbera animated series.

Cousin Itt appears in the 1992 animated series with his vocal effects provided by Pat Fraley. He is depicted as a carefree bachelor who is often seen in the company of female companions and is also a secret agent that is often targeted by the Spy Twins.

Cousin Itt appears in The New Addams Family performed by David Mylrea while his vocal effects are provided by Paul Dobson.

In the Netflix series Wednesday, one of his ancestors appears as one of the portraits of Nevermore Academy, named "Ignatius Itt".

=== Film ===
In the 1991 feature film The Addams Family, Cousin Itt (spelled "It", and performed and voiced by John Franklin) has a minor role in which he becomes infatuated with Margaret Alford (Dana Ivey), the mistreated wife of the Addams' crooked lawyer Tully Alford (Dan Hedaya), when he meets her at a party and asks her to dance. At the end of the film, Margaret and Cousin Itt begin to date, later to marry some time after Tully and the film's main antagonist Abigail Craven (Elizabeth Wilson) are defeated and buried alive.

Cousin Itt appears in Addams Family Values performed again by Franklin. He and Margaret are shown to still be together, and they have a child named "What”, who resembles a miniature version of Itt.

In the 1998 direct-to-video film Addams Family Reunion, Itt (performed by Phil Fondacaro) is pursued by a mutant dog invented by Uncle Fester that feeds on human hair.

Cousin Itt appears in the 2019 animated film (also spelled "It") where he is voiced by Snoop Dogg. He is portrayed as being smaller in this incarnation than in any other, being shorter than Pugsley, the youngest Addams child. Here, Itt also has visibly solid arms not made of hair, unlike previous incarnations, and legs under his hair. He is also notably depicted as a playboy, making him one of the few members of the family to have been truly accepted by society.

Cousin Itt appears in The Addams Family 2 voiced again by Snoop Dogg. While on their cross-country road trip, the Addams Family meets up with Cousin Itt in Miami as he arrives on a jet ski. During a pep talk with Wednesday, Cousin Itt revealed to her that he once shaved his body during his teenage years as he shows her a picture of what he looked like without his extra hair. As Cousin Itt travels with the family, he had to leave them earlier to help Grandmama when her house party at the Addams Family house gets out of control. By the time the Addams Family returns home, Cousin Itt and Grandmama have got the party under control.

== Relationships ==
=== Family tree ===
Addams family tree

Grandmama (Note: In the Broadway musical The Addams Family, Morticia refers to Grandmama as Gomez and Uncle Fester's mother, to which Gomez reacts with surprise and says that he had thought she was Morticia's mother. Morticia later says that Grandmama "may not even be part of this family", referencing Grandmama's ever-changing relation to the family.)
Debbie Jellinsky (Note: Established in the 1993 film Addams Family Values.)	Uncle Fester	Cousin Itt	Margaret Alford	Tully Alford
Mal Beineke (Note: Established in the Broadway musical The Addams Family.)	Alice Beineke	Gomez Addams	Morticia Addams (née Frump)	Rupert Styx (Note: Established in the 1964 episode "Halloween with the Addams Family".)
Lucas Beineke	Wednesday Addams	Pugsley Addams	Pubert Addams
Wednesday Addams Jr. (Note: Established in the 1977 film Halloween with the New Addams Family.)	Pugsley Addams Jr.

== Legacy ==
Two plant species native to eastern Australia, Casuarina glauca and Acacia cognata, have both had cultivars developed called "Cousin Itt" due to their short size and shaggy appearance.
