= The Addams Family =

Fictional family created by Charles Addams

- The Addams Family as originally depicted in The New Yorker. Left to Right: Grandmama, Wednesday, Gomez, Morticia, butler Lurch, Pugsley, Uncle Fester
- Created by: Charles Addams
- Original work: The New Yorker cartoons
- Owners: Amazon MGM Studios (current multimedia rights holder) (Note: In addition, multiple entities hold rights to older Addams Family adaptations. Skydance Corporation under Paramount Pictures and Warner Bros. Entertainment, holds the rights to the 1991 film & its 1993 sequel (the 1991 film in particular is also owned by MGM under Orion Pictures internationally) and both animated TV series, and Walt Disney Studios holds the 1998 film and TV series.); Tee & Charles Addams foundation (merchandise)

Print publications
- Book: The Addams Family strikes back by W F Miksch (1965) The Addams Family: An Evilution (2010)
- Comic strip: See below (1938)

Films and television
- Films: The Addams Family (1991); Addams Family Values (1993); The Addams Family (2019); The Addams Family 2 (2021)
- Short film: The Addams Family Fun-House (1973)
- Television series: The Addams Family (1964–1966); The New Addams Family (1998–1999); Wednesday (2022–present)
- Animated series: The Addams Family (1973); The Addams Family (1992–1993)
- Television specials: The New Scooby-Doo Movies (1972); Halloween with the New Addams Family (1977)
- Direct-to-video: Addams Family Reunion (1998)

Theatrical presentations
- Musical: The Addams Family (2010)

Games
- Video games: List of video games

Audio
- Soundtracks: Addams Family Values: Music from the Motion Picture; Addams Family Values: The Original Orchestral Score; The Addams Family (2019)

The Addams Family is a fictional family and franchise created by American cartoonist Charles Addams. The Addams are an eccentric old-money clan who delight in the macabre and the grotesque and are seemingly unaware or unconcerned that other people find them bizarre or frightening. The family's view in seeing their family life and interests as normal was a basis for the satire and comedy. They originally appeared in a series of 150 standalone single-panel comics, about half of which were originally published in The New Yorker between 1938 and their creator's death in 1988. They have since appeared in other media, such as television, film, video games, comic books, a musical, and merchandise.

The family members were unnamed until the 1960s. Matriarch Morticia and daughter Wednesday received their names when a licensed doll collection was released in 1962; patriarch Gomez and son Pugsley were named when the 1964 television series debuted. The Addams Family consists of Gomez and Morticia Addams, their children, Wednesday and Pugsley, and close family members Uncle Fester (Note: There are canonical differences between the various incarnations of Fester Addams. In the two live-action feature films, both animated series, the 1998 television film, and the 2019 animated film, he is portrayed as Gomez's brother. In the 1964 television series, however, he is portrayed as Morticia's maternal uncle (via her mother, Hester Frump).) and Grandmama, (Note: Just like Fester, there are canonical differences between the various incarnations of Grandmama. In the two live-action feature films, both animated series, and the 1998 television film, Grandmama is portrayed as Morticia's mother. In his notes for the original cartoons, Charles Addams even refers to her as Grandma Frump, rendering her Wednesday's and Pugsley's maternal grandmother. In the 1964 television series and the 2019 animated film, however, she is portrayed as Gomez's mother. Differently still, in the Broadway musical, Morticia refers to Grandmama as Gomez and Uncle Fester's mother, to which Gomez reacts with surprise and says that he thought she was Morticia's mother. Morticia later remarks that Grandmama "may not even be part of this family".) their butler Lurch, and Pugsley's pet octopus, Aristotle. The dimly seen Thing (later a disembodied hand) was introduced in 1954, and Gomez's Cousin Itt, Morticia's pet lion Kitty Kat and Morticia's carnivorous plant Cleopatra in 1964. Pubert Addams, Wednesday and Pugsley's infant brother, was introduced in the 1993 film Addams Family Values. (Note: In Halloween with the New Addams Family, Gomez and Morticia have a second son, Pugsley Jr., and a second daughter, Wednesday Jr. Meanwhile, in Addams Family Values, Gomez and Morticia welcome a third son, Pubert Addams. No released media has featured Pugsley Jr., Wednesday Jr., and Pubert together.)

The live-action television series premiered on ABC on Friday, September 18, 1964, and ran for two seasons. An animated series from Hanna-Barbera aired in 1973 and the characters had cameos in the animated The New Scooby-Doo Movies. The 1960s television show characters and actors returned in a 1977 telefilm titled Halloween with the New Addams Family.

The franchise was revived in the 1990s with a feature film series consisting of The Addams Family (1991) and Addams Family Values (1993). The films inspired a second animated series (1992–1993) which is set in the same fictional universe. The series was rebooted with a 1998 direct-to-video film and a spin-off live-action television series (1998–1999). In 2010, a live musical adaptation featuring Nathan Lane and Bebe Neuwirth opened on Broadway to tepid reviews, but it was nominated for two Tony Awards and eight Drama Desk Awards, winning one Drama Desk Award for Outstanding Set Design. The series was rebooted again in 2019 with the animated film The Addams Family, which led to a sequel in 2021. In 2022, Netflix debuted the original live action series Wednesday, based around the daughter of the family.

The franchise has spawned a video game series, academic books and soundtracks, which are based around its Grammy-nominated theme song. A staple in pop culture for eight decades, The Addams Family has influenced American comics, cinema and television. The goth subculture and its fashion have also been influenced by The Addams Family.

== History ==
=== Origins and The New Yorker cartoons (1933–1964) ===
Charles Addams began as a cartoonist in The New Yorker with a sketch of a window washer that ran on February 6, 1932. Addams first drew the then-unnamed Morticia some years before her first published appearance in The New Yorker. Some sources give a date of 1933, while Addams himself when asked in interview suggested "around 1937". Media speculation at the time often connected Morticia to Charles Addams' first wife Barbara Jean Day, but he had yet to meet her. In an interview in 1981 he acknowledged that Morticia reflected the qualities he was attracted to. Because of this, the women he married later on resembled the character. He described Morticia as "not patterned after anyone in particular, although I've often thought there was a little Gloria Swanson in her".

The first Addams Family cartoon was published in 1938, in a one-panel gag format. Charles Addams became a regular contributor to The New Yorker and drew approximately 1,300 cartoons between then and his death in 1988. 58 of these would feature the Addams Family, almost all of which were published in the 1940s and 1950s. Members of the family were introduced one by one, with Morticia first, Gomez (based on Thomas E. Dewey) joining four years later, Pugsley, and finally Wednesday and Fester shortly after. Addams indicated that Fester resembled himself, "plus a little more hair". A Christmas 1946 strip, showing the family pouring boiling oil on carolers, was well received and was later sold on Christmas cards. Outside of The New Yorker, Addams also published several collections, the most notable being Dear Dead Days: A Family Album in 1959.

In 1946, Addams briefly collaborated with science fiction writer Ray Bradbury, planning out an illustrated book about a supernatural family named The Elliotts, similar to The Addams Family. There was difficulty finding a publisher however, and the two went their separate ways. These stories were eventually anthologized in From the Dust Returned (2001), with a connecting narrative, an explanation of their collaboration, and the artwork Addams had created for the project in 1946.

Beginning in the early 1960s, the development of the television series affected the comics. For one thing, it is claimed that Wednesday was first given her name in reference to the nursery rhyme Monday's Child, where "Wednesday's child is full of woe". Actress and poet Joan Blake offered Charles Addams the idea for the name and the others were eventually named ahead of the series' debut. Some suggestions from series showrunner David Levy were introduced into the last comics of the era, including the addition of Thing and Cousin Itt. Itt was an invention of Levy's, while Thing was an expansion on a disembodied hand that had appeared in a 1954 strip. The comics ceased publication in The New Yorker in 1964, as the editor William Shawn banned the characters. He was concerned about the image of the publication, and did not want it associated with a mainstream sitcom. Smithsonian Magazine called him "snooty" for the decision.

=== TV adaptations and rise to popularity (1964–1977) ===
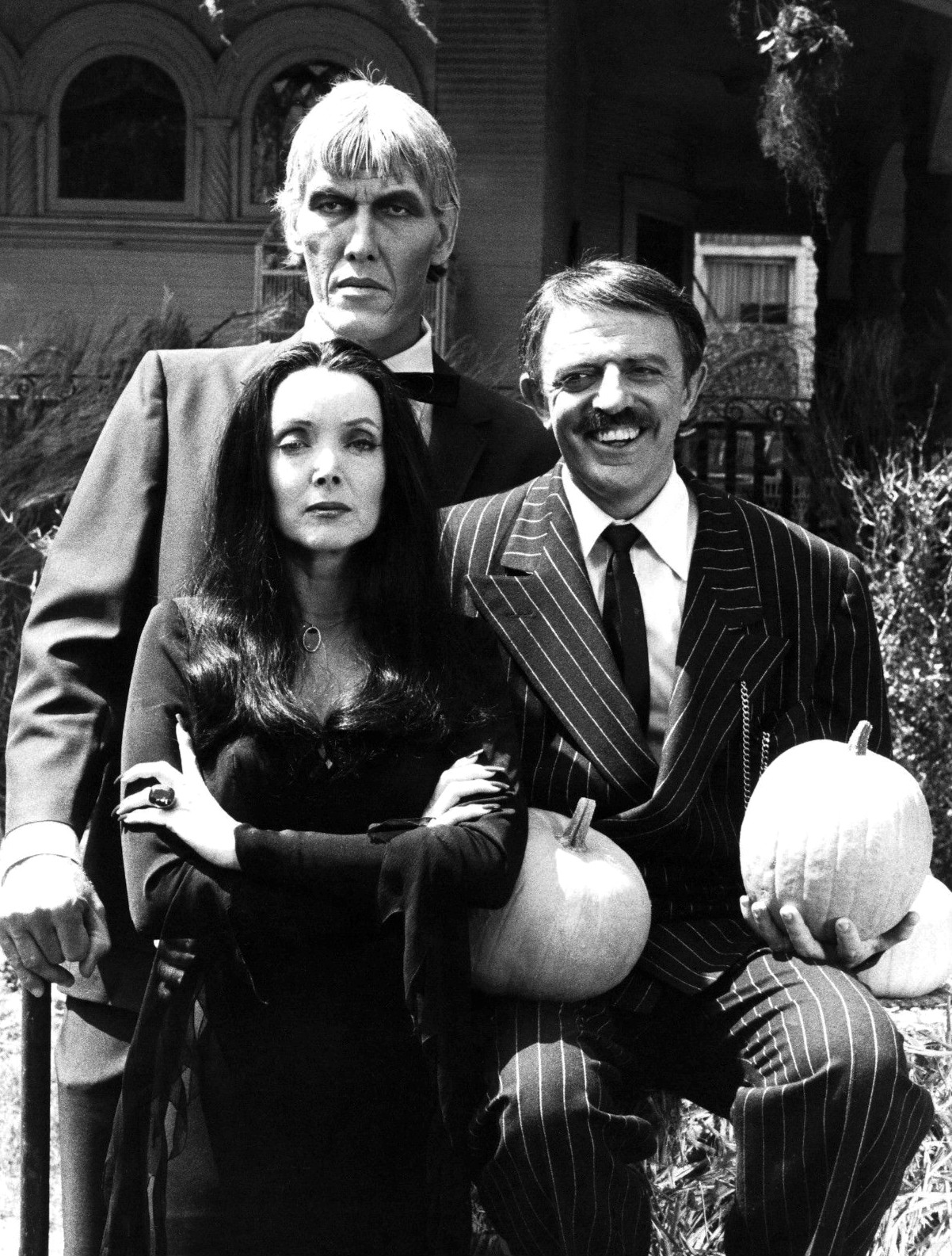
The cast of the 1977 TV film

In the early 1960s, former NBC executive David Levy stumbled across one of Addams' books in a New York bookstore and realized that the tone would be perfect for television. He purchased the book and met with Addams in the Plaza Hotel, and the topic of a television adaptation was raised. Addams had been approached about television adaptations by others in the past, but he was inclined to take Levy up on the offer because of their shared friend in the author John O'Hara. At the next meeting, at Addams' apartment, Levy indicated the characters would need to be named, and Addams came up with a list for the third meeting. According to Levy, Addams had little involvement with the series after those three meetings. He retained the right to veto casting decisions and other choices, but did not make use of the power. Some rights to the franchise were given to Filmways, the production company for the show.

The 1964 television adaptation on ABC brought the series to a much wider audience and was well received publicly. Producer Nat Perrin took a "less evil" approach to the characters and stories than Addams had in the cartoons, emphasizing lighter, more comedic elements. Stephen Cox later described the series as "more zany than spooky". Charles Addams himself was less happy with the series, criticising the characters for being "half as evil" as in the comics.

The popular series, broadcast on the ABC network, ran only two seasons. No official reason was given for the cancellation, though Smithsonian Magazine speculated that it was due to the adoption of color programming on the network the following year. It has also been suggested that competition with Hogan's Heroes in the same time slot on CBS was a factor.

The show’s cancellation in 1966 brought issues for Addams, as he faced a drop in income with the show no longer in production. His second wife Barbara Barb was a practicing lawyer who had engaged in "diabolical legal scheming" during their marriage, and had convinced Addams to sign over the rights to future television and film adaptations, as well as rights to some of his other cartoons. Following their divorce she remained in possession of these rights until 1991, when she sold them to allow development of the Sonnenfeld films. Addams could also no longer publish his comics in The New Yorker as Shawn's ban remained in effect even after the television series concluded. Addams became bitter towards the magazine "for disowning his family". The franchise remained in the popular consciousness even after the series concluded, with the "Lurch" dance move remaining popular through the 1960s. The television series was often re-run through television syndication for years afterward, particularly in Australia.

Hanna-Barbera parodied the show in November 1964 by introducing a family named "The Gruesomes" to The Flintstones, and the Gruesomes appeared occasionally in Flintstones media into the early 1970s. The studio later animated a 1972 Addams Family crossover with Scooby-Doo, which led to a 1973 animated series. The animated incarnation featured a new cast except for Felix Silla, who returned as Cousin Itt. The show had good ratings and spawned a line of children's merchandise, but only aired 16 episodes. A pilot was also produced that year for a new live action series entitled The Addams Family Funhouse, using a different cast. The pilot was aired in 1973 but never picked up for a full series.

A 1977 special, Halloween with the New Addams Family, reunited most of the original cast from the 1964 series, with Blossom Rock absent due to her health. The made-for-TV movie faced issues during production and was poorly received. It was shot using a house set that had been constructed for the horror film Ben, which didn't resemble the original Addams mansion and caused technical issues with lighting. The film was widely criticised for the script, direction, and the performances of some of the actors. Jackie Coogan in particular was recovering from a mild stroke during filming.

=== Wave of interest in Australia (1979–1989) ===
While William Shawn's ban on further Addams Family comics in The New Yorker persisted until 1987, Addams was able to sneak in several of the characters as a cameo in Z Line Subway, a 1979 strip. He married Marilyn Matthews Miller in 1981, in an Addams family themed ceremony conducted in a cemetery. Filmways, the production company of the 1964 series and holder of some franchise rights, was purchased in 1982 by Orion Pictures. The retirement of Shawn in 1987 allowed a brief return of the cartoons to The New Yorker, though Addams died only a year later. While largely inactive in the United States, the franchise did however see a wave of popularity in Australia, brought on by widely watched reruns on TCN-9. New merchandise was released in Australia and a "Morticia Boutique Dress Shop" opened in Melbourne in 1988. A satellite-linked interview with surviving members of the original cast was also aired on Australian television. A fan quoted by Cox credited the tone of the Addams family for its success in 1980s Australia, noting that the characters were "less American" than the Munsters, and that Australians had a different life-style. Astin reprised his role as Gomez for a 1989 episode of Nick at Nite's Sitcom Zone, in which he introduced reruns of shows for a two-hour programming block. A 1989 video game Fester's Quest was developed by Sunsoft, and received mixed reviews. To promote the game some black-and-white advertisements were filmed using the characters.

=== Film series and The New Addams Family (1991–2001) ===
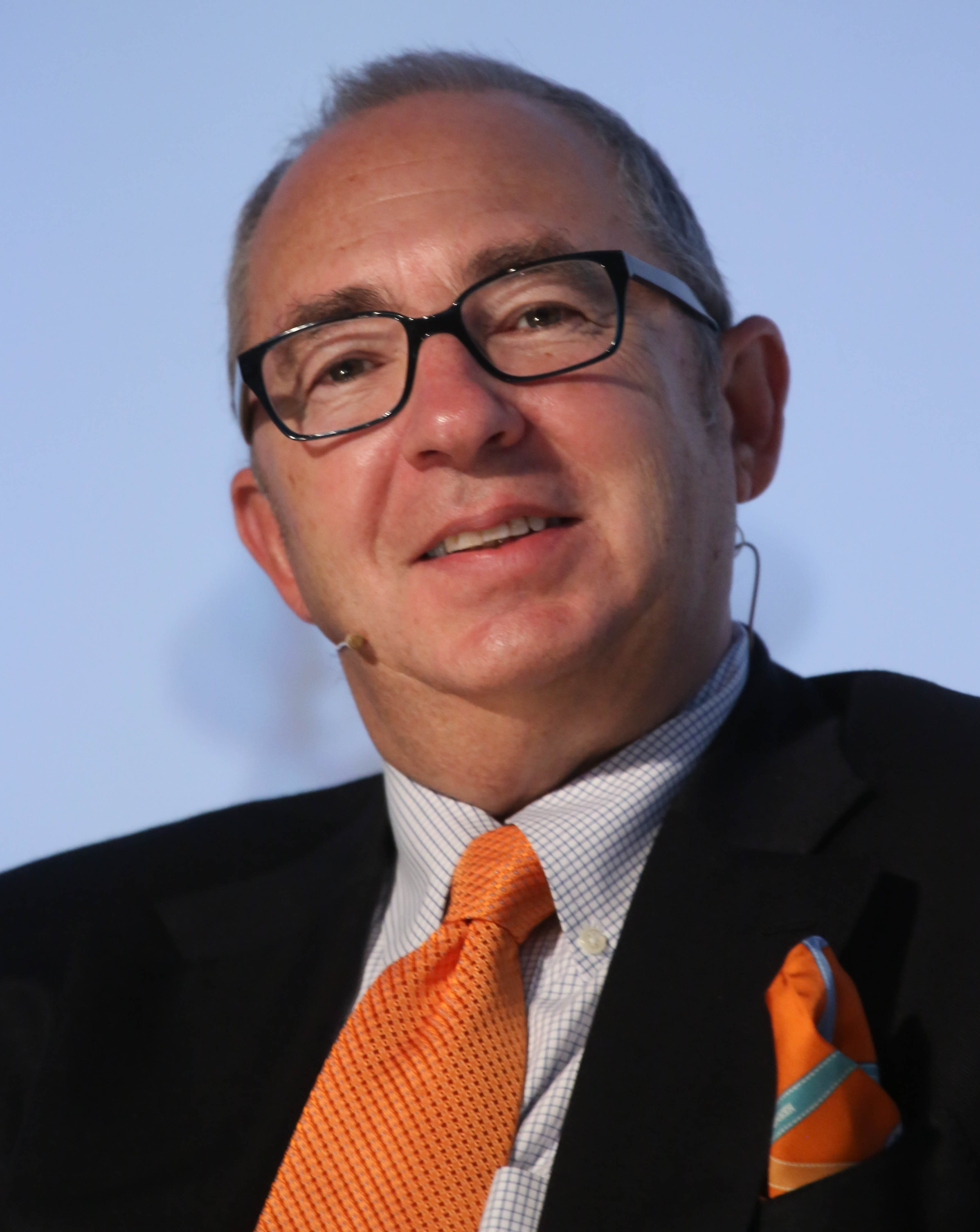
Barry Sonnenfeld (pictured 2012) directed two successful film adaptations in the 1990s.

The head of production at 20th Century Fox, Scott Rudin, pitched an Addams Family film but Fox did not have the rights to the franchise. The rights were at the time split between two parties: The late Addams' second wife Barbara Barb, and Orion Pictures. The latter were in possession of film rights in particular after purchasing Filmways in 1982. Fox attempted to purchase those rights but failed, as Orion had plans for a new TV series. The studio's plans changed however after Barb sold her rights to Orion, and the studio brought Rudin on board to produce a film. Caroline Thompson and Larry Wilson wrote a script, and faced many re-writes early on. Tim Burton was considered for director, but the role ultimately went to Barry Sonnenfeld. The film featured a new cast, Blossom Rock (Grandmama) having died in 1978, Ted Cassidy (Lurch) in 1979, Carolyn Jones (Morticia) in 1983 and Jackie Coogan (Fester) in 1984. Production on the film was troubled, with Sonnenfeld blacking out on set, and a burst blood vessel in Raul Julia's eye further delaying the shoot. Director of photography Owen Roizman quit the production three months from completion, forcing Sonnenfeld to take on the role in addition to his existing responsibilities. Orion faced financial issues and sold the project and Addams family rights to Paramount mid-production- though the deal did not include overseas home media rights, which harmed distribution after release. Orion retained those, and those rights passed to Metro-Goldwyn-Mayer when the studio was bought out in 1997.

While the 1991 film received mixed reviews from critics, it performed reasonably well at the box office despite its production issues. The film triggered a lawsuit from David Levy over its use of Thing and Cousin Itt, as Levy had been the creator of those characters ahead of the launch of the 1964 television series. The case was settled out of court and the resolution is not known publicly. A second film in 1993, Addams Family Values was highly regarded by critics but performed poorly at the box office unexpectedly, and earned less than half the revenue of its predecessor. This, and the sudden death of Julia in 1994, prevented Sonnenfeld from producing further films. Both films received nominations for Academy Awards, BAFTA Awards, and Hugo Awards. For her role as Morticia, Anjelica Huston was twice nominated for the Golden Globe Award for Best Actress, and Raul Julia (as Gomez), Christina Ricci (as Wednesday), Christopher Lloyd (as Fester), and Joan Cusack (as Fester's wife, Debbie Jellinsky, in the sequel) received multiple Saturn Award and American Comedy Award nominations for their portrayals.

Following the wave of interest in the franchise, a 1992 animated television series notably saw John Astin reprise his role as Gomez, almost thirty years after his first appearance in the role in 1964. It was nominated for four Daytime Emmy Awards, including one for Astin. That year, a pinball machine based on the franchise was also released, featuring original voice acting from Julia and Huston as Gomez and Morticia. It went on to become the highest selling pinball machine of all time at over 20,000 units.

A direct-to-video film, Addams Family Reunion produced by Saban Entertainment in 1998, featured the return of Carel Struycken as Lurch and Christopher Hart as Thing, but was otherwise unrelated to the Sonnenfeld films. It was very poorly received. The film was intended as the pilot for a Canadian-produced live-action television series, The New Addams Family, made with a mostly different cast and airing the following year. Astin, then in his late 60s, returned as Grandpapa Addams in the TV series, rather than Gomez, who was played by Glenn Taranto. The show concluded after a single season in 1999. A video game adaptation of The New Addams Family was released in 2001 for the Game Boy Color.

=== Musical and animated adaptations (2007–2021) ===
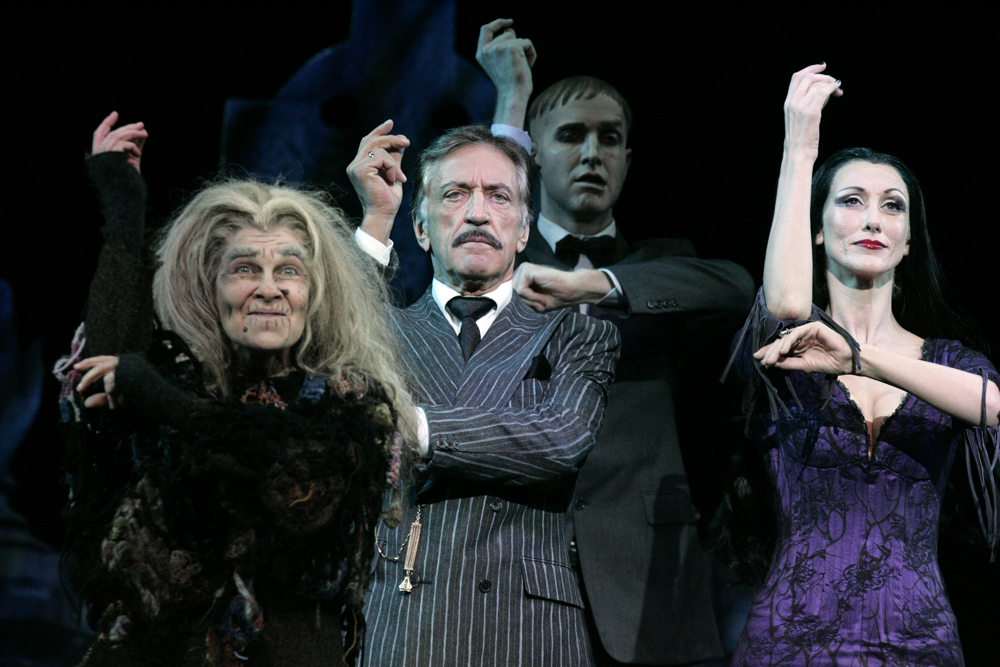
The musical performed in Sydney, 2013

In 2007, Elephant Eye Theatrical announced that they had obtained the rights to a musical adaptation of the comic series, which at that time were held by the Tee and Charles Addams Foundation. After a try-out in Chicago in 2009, the musical was performed on Broadway in 2010, and thereafter in a sequence of international tours until 2021.

The rights to the franchise were purchased by Illumination Entertainment in 2010, and the studio shortly announced a Tim Burton stop-motion led film. However, Burton withdrew from the project in 2013 over a decision to use computer animation rather than stop motion as he had intended. Metro-Goldwyn-Mayer acquired the remaining rights and announced a computer animated film the same year, and entered into production in the late 2010s. Unlike the Burton version, this would use 3D computer animation. The film was eventually released in 2019, to a moderate box-office sales and mixed reception. A sequel, released in 2021 amid the COVID-19 pandemic, was far less successful and poorly received critically.

=== Netflix series (2022–present) ===
Miles Millar and Alfred Gough began work on a live-action spin-off series entitled Wednesday in 2019, financed by MGM. The writers room for the series took place during the start of the COVID-19 pandemic, and so was conducted remotely. The project was formally announced in 2020, with Burton as executive producer. The series premiered with its first season in 2022 to critical acclaim, and a second season followed in 2025. Amazon purchased MGM in 2021, which in turn means that the Addams Family rights now rest with the company.

== Premise and background ==
Gomez and Pugsley are enthusiastic. Morticia is even in disposition, muted, witty, sometimes deadly. Grandma Frump is foolishly good-natured. Wednesday is her mother's daughter. A closely-knit family, the real head being Morticia – although each of the others is a definite character – except for Grandma, who is easily led. Many of the troubles they have as a family are due to Grandma's fumbling, weak character. The house is a wreck, of course, but this is a house-proud family just the same, and every trap door is in good repair. Money is no problem.
— Charles Addams

The family appears to be a branch of an extensive Addams clan, with relatives all over the world. In the original television series they are said to be related to "those one-D Adamses", a fact the family are deeply ashamed of. According to the film version, the family credo is, Sic gorgiamus allos subjectatos nunc (pseudo-Latin: "We gladly feast on those who would subdue us"). Charles Addams was first inspired by his hometown of Westfield, New Jersey, an area full of ornate Victorian mansions and archaic graveyards. In the original comics series they live in a 'gothic' house on Cemetery Ridge. According to the television series, the residence is a gloomy mansion adjacent to a cemetery and a swamp located in an unspecified American town. In the musical (first shown in Chicago in 2009), the house is located in Central Park. In the 2019 film, the Addamses live in an abandoned asylum located in the outskirts of the state of New Jersey which is haunted by a disembodied resident who demands the property remain undisturbed.

Although most of the humor derives from the fact that they share macabre interests, such as putting each other and themselves in the way of bodily harm (none of which seems to have any effect), the television Addamses are not evil. They are a close-knit extended family. Morticia is an exemplary mother, and she and Gomez remain passionate towards each other; as established in the television series: She occasionally fondly calls him bubbeleh, (Note: bubbeleh: "little boy" – Austro-Bavarian / Yiddish) to which he responds by kissing her arms, behavior which Morticia can also provoke by speaking a few words in French (their meanings are not important; any words in French will do). The parents are supportive of their children (except in the 2019 film when Wednesday arrives home wearing a pink dress). The family is friendly and hospitable to visitors; in some cases, it is willing to donate large sums of money to causes (television series and films), despite the visitors' horror at the Addamses' peculiar lifestyle. The characters were unnamed until the advent of the 1964 television adaptation (except for Wednesday and Morticia, who were named for a 1962 licensed doll collection).

== Cast and characters ==
Live-action media
Live-action media	Gomez	Morticia	Pugsley	Wednesday	Uncle Fester	Grandmama	Lurch	Thing	Cousin Itt
1964 TV series	John Astin	Carolyn Jones	Ken Weatherwax	Lisa Loring	Jackie Coogan	Blossom Rock	Ted Cassidy	Ted Cassidy / Jack Voglin	Felix Silla
The Addams Family Fun-House (1973)	Jack Riley	Liz Torres	Butch Patrick	Noelle von Sonn	Stubby Kaye	—	Pat McCormick	—	Felix Silla
Halloween with the New Addams Family (1977)	John Astin	Carolyn Jones	Ken Weatherwax	Lisa Loring	Jackie Coogan	Jane Rose	Ted Cassidy	Ted Cassidy	Felix Silla
1991 film	Raul Julia	Anjelica Huston	Jimmy Workman	Christina Ricci	Christopher Lloyd	Judith Malina	Carel Struycken	Christopher Hart	John Franklin
Addams Family Values (1993)	Raul Julia	Anjelica Huston	Jimmy Workman	Christina Ricci	Christopher Lloyd	Carol Kane	Carel Struycken	Christopher Hart	John Franklin
Addams Family Reunion (1998)	Tim Curry	Daryl Hannah	Jerry Messing	Nicole Fugere	Patrick Thomas	Alice Ghostley	Carel Struycken	—	Phil Fondacaro
The New Addams Family (1998)	Glenn Taranto	Ellie Harvie	Brody Smith	Nicole Fugere	Michael Roberds	Betty Phillips	John DeSantis	Steven Fox	David Mylrea / Paul Dobson
Wednesday (2022)	Luis Guzmán	Catherine Zeta-Jones	Isaac Ordonez	Jenna Ortega	Fred Armisen	Joanna Lumley (as Grandmama Frump)	George Burcea (season 1) / Joonas Suotamo (season 2)	Victor Dorobantu	—

Animated media
Animated media	Gomez	Morticia	Pugsley	Wednesday	Uncle Fester	Grandmama	Lurch	Cousin Itt
Wednesday Is Missing (1972)	John Astin	Carolyn Jones	Jodie Foster	Cindy Henderson	Jackie Coogan	Janet Waldo (as Granny Frump)	Ted Cassidy	John Stephenson
1973 animated series	Lennie Weinrib	Janet Waldo	Jodie Foster	Cindy Henderson	Jackie Coogan	Janet Waldo (as Granny Frump)	Ted Cassidy	John Stephenson
1992 animated series	John Astin	Nancy Linari	Jeannie Elias	Debi Derryberry	Rip Taylor	Carol Channing (as Granny Frump)	Jim Cummings	Pat Fraley
2019 animated film	Oscar Isaac	Charlize Theron	Finn Wolfhard	Chloë Grace Moretz	Nick Kroll	Bette Midler	Conrad Vernon	Snoop Dogg
The Addams Family 2 (2021)	Oscar Isaac	Charlize Theron	Javon Walton	Chloë Grace Moretz	Nick Kroll	Bette Midler	Conrad Vernon	Snoop Dogg

Video games
Video games	Gomez	Morticia	Pugsley	Wednesday	Uncle Fester	Grandmama	Lurch	Cousin Itt
The Addams Family: Mansion Mayhem (2021)	Jonathan Lipow	Alexa Kahn	Paul Castro Jr.	Cristina Vee	Bill Rogers	Jocelyn Blue	Kaiser Johnson	Jonathan Lipow

=== Ophelia Addams ===
Ophelia Addams is the daisy crown-wearing sister of Morticia and the white sheep of the family who has appeared in The New Yorker cartoons and other media appearances.

== Adaptations ==
=== Television ===
Series	Season	Episodes	Originally released		
Series	Season	Episodes	First released	Last released	Network
Live-action series
The Addams Family	1	34	September 18, 1964	May 21, 1965	ABC
The Addams Family	2	30	September 17, 1965	April 8, 1966	ABC
The Addams Family	Halloween special		October 30, 1977		NBC
The New Addams Family	1	65	October 19, 1998	August 28, 1999	YTV (Canada); Fox Family Channel (United States)
Wednesday	1	8	November 23, 2022		Netflix
Wednesday	2	8	August 6, 2025	September 3, 2025	Netflix
Wednesday	3	TBA	TBA	TBA	Netflix
Animated series
The Addams Family	Scooby-Doo crossover		September 23, 1972		CBS
The Addams Family	1	16	September 8, 1973	December 22, 1973	NBC
The Addams Family	1	13	September 12, 1992	December 5, 1992	ABC
The Addams Family	2	8	September 18, 1993	November 6, 1993	ABC

==== The Addams Family (1964–1966) ====
In 1964, the ABC TV network created The Addams Family television series based on Addams's cartoon characters. The series was shot in black-and-white and aired for two seasons in 64 half-hour episodes (September 18, 1964 – September 2, 1966). During the original television run of The Addams Family television series, The New Yorker editor William Shawn refused to publish any Addams Family cartoons. However, he continued to publish other Charles Addams cartoons. Shawn regarded his magazine as targeting a more refined readership and he did not want it to be associated with characters who could be seen on television by the more general public. After Shawn's 1987 retirement, the characters were welcomed back to The New Yorker.

==== The New Scooby-Doo Movies (1972) ====
The Addams Family's first animated appearance was on the third episode of Hanna-Barbera's The New Scooby-Doo Movies, "Scooby-Doo Meets the Addams Family" (a.k.a. "Wednesday is Missing"), which first aired on CBS Saturday morning, on September 23, 1972. Four members of the original cast (John Astin, Carolyn Jones, Jackie Coogan, and Ted Cassidy) returned for the special, which involved the Addamses in a mystery with the Scooby-Doo gang. The Addams Family characters were drawn to the specifications of the original Charles Addams cartoons. After the episode aired, fans wanted more animated adventures featuring the Addamses, and Hanna-Barbera obliged.

==== The Addams Family Fun-House (1973) ====
In late 1972, ABC produced a pilot for a live-action musical variety show which was titled The Addams Family Fun-House. The cast included Jack Riley and Liz Torres as Gomez and Morticia (the pair also co-wrote the special), Stubby Kaye as Uncle Fester, Pat McCormick as Lurch and Butch Patrick (who had played Eddie Munster on The Munsters) as Pugsley. Felix Silla reprised his role as Cousin Itt, connecting it to the original TV series. The pilot aired in 1973, but it was not picked up for a series.

==== The Addams Family (1973) ====
The first animated series ran on Saturday mornings from September 8 – December 22, 1973 on NBC. In a departure from the original series, this series took the Addamses on the road in a Victorian-style RV. This series also marked the point where the relationships between the characters were changed so that Fester was now Gomez's brother, and Grandmama was now Morticia's mother (though the old relationships between the characters would be revisited in the 1977 television movie, in order to retain its continuity with the original sitcom). Although Coogan and Cassidy reprised their roles as Uncle Fester and Lurch, Astin and Jones did not; their parts were recast with Hanna-Barbera voice talents Lennie Weinrib as Gomez and Janet Waldo as Morticia, while a ten-year-old Jodie Foster provided the voice of Pugsley. Again, the characters were drawn to the specifications of the original Charles Addams cartoons. The show also had appearances from Thing, Cousin Itt, Kitty Kat and Cleopatra from the original series. The show also introduces new Addams Family animal companions, such as Ali the alligator, Ocho the octopus and Mr. V the vulture. One season was produced, and the second season consisted of reruns. The show's theme music was completely different and it had no lyrics and no finger snaps, although it retained a bit of the four-note score from the live-action show.

===== The Addams Family Comic Book =====
From 1974 to 1975, Gold Key Comics produced a comic book series in connection with the show, but it only lasted three issues. Each issue was adapted from a TV episode, starting with "In Search of the Boola-Boola" (October 1974).

==== Halloween with the New Addams Family (1977) ====
A television reunion movie, Halloween with the New Addams Family, aired on NBC on Sunday, October 30, 1977. It features most of the original cast, except Blossom Rock, who had played Grandmama. She was still alive but was very ill at the time; Jane Rose replaced her. Veteran character actors Parley Baer and Vito Scotti, who both had recurring roles in the original series, also appeared in the movie. The movie has a slightly different version of the theme song; the finger snaps are used but not the lyrics.

Gomez and Morticia have had two more children, Wednesday Jr. and Pugsley Jr., who strongly resemble their older siblings. Gomez's brother, Pancho, is staying with the family while Gomez attends a lodge meeting in Tombstone, Arizona. Gomez is jealous of his brother, who once courted Morticia. Halloween is nigh, and Pancho tells the children the legend of the Great Pumpkin-like character of Cousin Shy, who distributes gifts and carves pumpkins for good children on Halloween night. Wednesday (now called "Wednesday, Sr.") is home from music academy, where she is studying the piccolo (breaking glass with it). Pugsley (now "Pugsley, Sr.") is home from a Nairobi medical school, where he is training to be a witch doctor. The family's home has been bugged by a gang of crooks which intends to steal the family's fortune. Lafferty, the boss, sends a gang member named Mikey into the house to investigate. Mikey panics and flees after treading on the tail of Kitty Kat the lion. The crooks employ a fake Gomez and Morticia to help them carry out their plans, along with two strong-arm goons, Hercules and Atlas. Gomez returns home to celebrate the Halloween party and trim the scarecrow. Lafferty poses as Quincy Addams (from Boston) to gain entrance to the house during the party. He has his men tie up Gomez and Morticia, and his doubles take their places, confusing Pancho, who is still in love with Morticia, and Ophelia, who is still in love with Gomez. Gomez and Morticia escape (thanks to the "Old Piccolo Game"), and rejoin the party, only to have Lafferty use various methods to try to get rid of them. Lurch scares off the thugs and terrifies Lafferty's other assistant. Fester, trying to be nice, puts Lafferty on the rack. Lafferty tries to escape through the secret passage and steps on Kitty Kat's tail. When the police arrive, the crooks gladly surrender. The Addamses are then free to celebrate Halloween happily, ending the night by singing together in welcome for Cousin Shy.

==== The Addams Family: The Animated Series (1992–1993) ====
The remake series ran on Saturday mornings from 1992 to 1993 on ABC after producers realized the success of the 1991 Addams Family movie. This series returned to the familiar format of the original series, with the Addams Family facing their sitcom situations at home. John Astin returned to the role of Gomez, and celebrities Rip Taylor and Carol Channing took over the roles of Fester and Grandmama, respectively. Veteran voice actors Jim Cummings, Debi Derryberry, Jeannie Elias and Pat Fraley did the voices of Lurch, Wednesday, Pugsley and Cousin Itt, respectively. New artistic models of the characters were used for this series, though still having a passing resemblance to the original cartoons. Two seasons were produced, with the third year containing reruns. Oddly in this series, Wednesday maintained her macabre, brooding attitude from the Addams Family movies. Still, her facial expressions and body language conveyed the happy-go-lucky, fun attitude of her portrayal in the original television show. The original Vic Mizzy theme song, although slightly different, was used for the opening.

==== The New Addams Family (1998–1999) ====
The New Addams Family was filmed in Vancouver, British Columbia, Canada, and ran for 65 episodes (one more than the original TV series) during the 1998–1999 season on the then-newly launched Fox Family Channel. Many storylines from the original series were reworked for this new series, incorporating more modern elements and jokes. John Astin returned to the franchise in some episodes of this series, albeit as "Grandpapa" Addams (Gomez's grandfather, a character introduced in Addams Family Reunion). The cast included Glenn Taranto as Gomez Addams, Ellie Harvie as Morticia, Michael Roberds as Fester, Brody Smith as Pugsley, Nicole Fugere (the only cast member from Addams Family Reunion to return) as Wednesday, John DeSantis as Lurch, Betty Phillips as Grandmama and Steven Fox as Thing.

==== Wednesday (2022) ====
In 2021, Netflix announced a live-action TV series adaptation based on Wednesday Addams, produced by MGM Television and starring Jenna Ortega as the title character. Alfred Gough and Miles Millar were the showrunners and Tim Burton directed several episodes in his first televised directorial effort. Wednesday, a student at Nevermore Academy, solves mysteries using her psychic ability. These include murders and a 25-year-old mystery involving her family. Luis Guzmán stars as Gomez, and Catherine Zeta-Jones stars as Morticia. In addition, Fred Armisen appears as Uncle Fester, George Burcea as Lurch, Victor Dorobantu as Thing, and Isaac Ordonez as Pugsley. Hunter Doohan, Georgie Farmer, Moosa Mostafa, Emma Myers, Naomi J. Ogawa, Joy Sunday, Percy Hynes White, Riki Lindhome, Jamie McShane and Gwendoline Christie were also added to the cast as series regulars. In March 2022, Christina Ricci, who portrayed Wednesday in The Addams Family (1991) and Addams Family Values (1993), joined the cast as a series regular.

=== Feature films ===
Crew/detail	Live action			Animated	
Crew/detail	The Addams Family (1991)	Addams Family Values (1993)	Addams Family Reunion (1998)	The Addams Family (2019)	The Addams Family 2 (2021)
Director	Barry Sonnenfeld	Barry Sonnenfeld	Dave Payne	Conrad Vernon; Greg Tiernan	Conrad Vernon; Greg Tiernan Co-directed by: Laura Brousseau; Kevin Pavlovic
Producer	Scott Rudin	Scott Rudin	Mike Elliott	Gail Berman; Conrad Vernon; Alex Schwartz; Alison O'Brien	Gail Berman; Conrad Vernon; Danielle Sterling; Alison O'Brien
Writer(s)	Caroline Thompson; Larry Wilson	Paul Rudnick	Rob Kerchner; Scott Sandin	Screenplay by: Matt Lieberman Story by: Matt Lieberman; Erica Rivinoja; Conrad Vernon	Screenplay by: Dan Hernandez; Benji Samit; Ben Queen; Susanna Fogel Story by: Dan Hernandez; Benji Samit
Composer	Marc Shaiman	Marc Shaiman	Amotz Plessner	Mychael Danna; Jeff Danna	Mychael Danna; Jeff Danna
Cinematography	Owen Roizman	Donald Peterman	Christian Sebaldt	—N/a	—N/a
Editor(s)	Dede Allen	Arthur Schmidt; Jim Miller	J. J. Jackson	David Ian Salter	Ryan Folsey
Production company	Scott Rudin Productions	Scott Rudin Productions	Saban Entertainment	Metro-Goldwyn-Mayer; Bron Creative; Nitrogen Studios; Cinesite Studios; The Jackal Group	Metro-Goldwyn-Mayer; Bron Creative; Nitrogen Studios; Cinesite Studios; The Jackal Group; Glickmania
Distributor	Paramount Pictures (United States and Latin America) Columbia Pictures (International)	Paramount Pictures	Warner Home Video	United Artists Releasing (United States) Universal Pictures (International)	
Runtime	99 minutes	94 minutes	91 minutes	87 minutes	93 minutes
Release date	November 22, 1991	November 19, 1993	September 22, 1998	October 11, 2019	October 1, 2021

==== The Addams Family (1991) ====
In the 1990s, Orion Pictures (which by then had inherited the rights to the series) developed a film version, The Addams Family (released on November 22, 1991). Because of the studio's financial troubles at the time, Orion sold the US rights to the film to Paramount Pictures. On October 1, 2019, Paramount Pictures released a double feature of The Addams Family and Addams Family Values on Blu-ray in the United States.

==== Addams Family Values (1993) ====
Upon the last film's success, a sequel followed: Addams Family Values (released on November 19, 1993, with worldwide distribution by Paramount). Loosened content restrictions allowed the films to use far more grotesque humor that strove to keep the Addams cartoons' original spirit (in fact, several gags were lifted straight from the single-panel cartoons). The two films used the same cast, except for Grandmama, played by Judith Malina and Carol Kane in the first and second films, respectively. A script for a third film was prepared in 1994, but was abandoned after the sudden death of actor Raul Julia that year.

==== Addams Family Reunion (1998) ====
Another film, Addams Family Reunion, was released direct-to-video on September 22, 1998, this time by Warner Bros. through its video division. It has no relation to the Paramount movies, being in fact a full-length pilot for a second live-action television version, The New Addams Family, produced and shot in Canada. The third movie's Gomez, played by Tim Curry, follows the style of Raul Julia, while the new sitcom's Gomez, played by Glenn Taranto, is played in the style of John Astin, who had played the character in the 1960s. The only actors in this Warner Bros./Saban Entertainment production to have acted in the previous Paramount films were Carel Struycken as Lurch and Christopher Hart as Thing.

==== Cancelled film ====
In 2010, it was announced that Illumination Entertainment, in partnership with Universal Pictures, had acquired the underlying rights to the Addams Family drawings. The film was planned to be a stop-motion animated film based on Charles Addams's original drawings. Tim Burton was set to co-write and co-produce the film, with a possibility to direct. In July 2013 however, it was reported that the film was cancelled.

==== The Addams Family (2019) and The Addams Family 2 (2021) ====
On October 31, 2013, it was announced in Variety that Metro-Goldwyn-Mayer would revive The Addams Family as an animated film with Pamela Pettler to write the screenplay and Andrew Mittman and Kevin Miserocchi to executive produce the film and they were in final negotiations with BermanBraun's Gail Berman and Lloyd Braun to produce it. By October 2017, Conrad Vernon had been hired to direct the film, which he produced along with Berman and Alex Schwartz, based on a screenplay written by Pettler, with revisions by Matt Lieberman. The film was released on October 11, 2019. On October 8, 2020, MGM announced that a sequel is in the works with an announcement trailer. Much of the original cast returned, with the exception of Finn Wolfhard, who was replaced by Javon "Wanna" Walton as the voice of Pugsley Addams. Bill Hader voiced a new character named Dr. Cyrus Strange. Directors Greg Tiernan and Conrad Vernon also returned for the sequel. The film released on October 1, 2021.

=== Homages and adaptations ===
- In 1959, an animated television homage was produced by Hanna-Barbera Productions. Mr. & Mrs. J. Evil Scientist, a family of fictional characters inspired by The Addams Family, appeared on the Snagglepuss and Snooper and Blabber shows and was later adapted into a comic book.
- In 1964, the year The Addams Family debuted, Hanna-Barbera introduced Weirdly and Creepella Gruesome and family, based in part on Mr. & Mrs. J. Evil Scientist and in part on the Addamses, as recurrent characters on The Flintstones.
- A 2012 episode of Horrible Histories features a song titled "The Borgia Family" in reference to the Addams Family Theme.
- In 2015, comedian Melissa Hunter wrote the web series Adult Wednesday Addams, which is a comedic adaptation of the franchise. Hunter was forced to remove the series due to legal action.

=== Video games ===
Ten video games released from 1989 to 2021 were based on The Addams Family.

- Fester's Quest (1989) is a top-down adventure game that features Uncle Fester.
- The Addams Family LCD Video Game by Tiger Electronics is a handheld unit released in 1991.
- ICOM Simulations published The Addams Family video game for the TurboGrafx-CD in 1991.
- Between 1992 and 1994, four versions of The Addams Family were released by Ocean Software based on the 1991 movie: an 8-bit home console version for the Nintendo Entertainment System, Sega Master System, and Sega Game Gear; an 8-bit portable console version for the Game Boy; an 8-bit home computer version for the ZX Spectrum, Commodore 64 and Amstrad CPC; and a 16-bit version released for the Super Nintendo Entertainment System, Amiga, Atari ST, and Sega Mega Drive/Genesis. The releases on Sega platforms were published by Acclaim Entertainment's Flying Edge imprint.
- The games' sequel, The Addams Family: Pugsley's Scavenger Hunt (1993), also by Ocean Software, was based on the ABC animated series and was released for SNES, NES, and Game Boy (although the latter two are 8-bit remakes of the first SNES game, swapping Pugsley's and Gomez's roles).
- Addams Family Values (1994) by Ocean is based on the movie sequel and returns to the style of gameplay seen in Fester's Quest.
- An arcade shocker, The New Addams Family Electric Shock Machine (also known as Electrifying), was released by Eurocom and Nova Productions in 1999.
- A Game Boy Color game was released in 2001 for promotion of The New Addams Family. The game was titled The New Addams Family Series. In this game, the Addams mansion had been bought by a fictional company called "Funnyday" that wanted to tear down the house and surrounding grounds to make room for an amusement park.
- A 2019 mobile game for Android and iOS, The Addams Family Mystery Mansion, was released by Animoca.
- The Addams Family: Mansion Mayhem, a movie tie-in game for Steam, Nintendo Switch, PlayStation 4, Xbox and Google Stadia developed by PHL Collective and published by British publisher Outright Games, was released on September 24, 2021.

=== Pinball ===
A pinball game by Midway (under the Bally label) was released in 1992 shortly after the movie. It is the best-selling pinball game of all time.

=== Books ===
==== The Addams Family ====
This first novelisation of the television series, written by Jack Sharkey, was released near the end of the show's second season. The book details the family's arrival in their new home and explains how it got its bizarre décor. The arrival and origins of Thing are explained. Each chapter reads as a self-contained story, like episodes of the television show. The novel concludes with the Addams family discovering that their lives will be the basis for a new television series. It was published in paperback by Pyramid Books in 1965.

==== The Addams Family Strikes Back ====
The Addams Family Strikes Back by W.F. Miksch tells how Gomez plans to rehabilitate the image of Benedict Arnold by running for the local school board. The tone and characterizations in this book resemble the TV characters much more closely than in the first novel. Cousin Itt appears as a minor character in this story, but as a tiny, three-legged creature rather than the hairy, derby-hatted character seen on television and in the movies. The novel was published in paperback form by Pyramid Books in 1965.

==== The Addams Family: An Evilution ====
The Addams Family: An Evilution is a book about the "evilution" of The Addams Family characters, with more than 200 published and previously unpublished cartoons, and includes text by Charles Addams and H. Kevin Miserocchi, Director of the Tee and Charles Addams Foundation. Pomegranate Press published the book in 2010.

=== Advertising ===
In 1994, the actors cast as the Addamses in the first two films (sans the recently deceased Raul Julia) were in several Japanese television spots for the Honda Odyssey. The Addamses are seen speaking Japanese—most prominently Gomez (for whom a voice actor was used to impersonate Julia while footage from Addams Family Values was seen) and Morticia.

In 2007 and 2008, the Addams Family appeared as M&M's in an advertising campaign for M&M's Dark Chocolate.

=== Soundtrack ===
A theme song for the 1964 TV series as well as a soundtrack album the next year were released, both composed by Vic Mizzy and the latter containing all of his compositions for the series entitled Original Music From The Addams Family.

=== Musical ===
==== The Addams Family ====
In May 2007, it was announced that a musical inspired by The Addams Family drawings by Charles Addams was being developed for the Broadway stage. Broadway veterans Marshall Brickman and Rick Elice wrote the book, and Andrew Lippa wrote the score. Julian Crouch and Phelim McDermott (Improbable theatre founders) directed and designed the production, with choreography by Sergio Trujillo. A workshop and private industry presentation was held August 4–8, 2008. Featured in the cast were Bebe Neuwirth as Morticia, Krysta Rodriguez as Wednesday, and Nathan Lane as Gomez. In addition, Kevin Chamberlin played Uncle Fester and Zachary James played Lurch.

The musical opened in previews at the Lunt-Fontanne Theatre on Broadway on March 8, 2010, with an official opening on April 8, after an out-of-town tryout in Chicago at the Ford Center for the Performing Arts from November 13, 2009, to January 10, 2010. The cast includes Lane as Gomez, Neuwirth as Morticia, Terrence Mann as Mal Beineke, Carolee Carmello as Alice Beineke, Chamberlin as Uncle Fester, Jackie Hoffman as Grandma, Zachary James as Lurch, Krysta Rodriguez as Wednesday, and Wesley Taylor as Wednesday's love interest, Lucas Beineke. The Broadway production ran for 22 months, closing on December 31, 2011, after 35 previews and 722 performances.

On September 5, 2016, it was announced that the musical would premiere in the UK, on a major UK and Ireland tour produced by James Yeoburn and Stuart Matthew Price for United Theatrical. The production was directed by Matthew White and it opened at Edinburgh Festival Theatre on April 20, 2017, starring Samantha Womack, Les Dennis and Carrie Hope Fletcher.

== Legacy ==
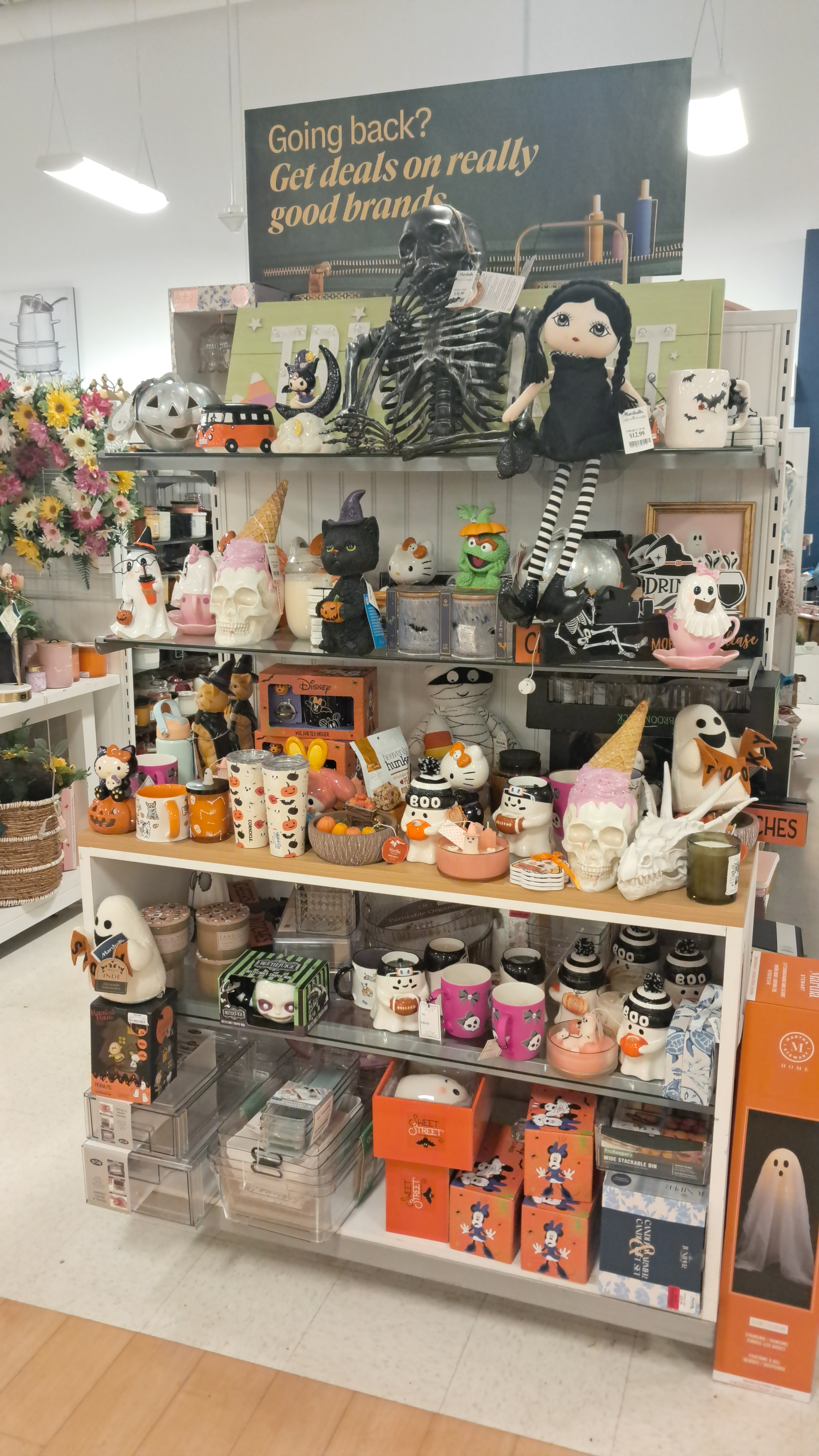
A Wednesday Addams shelf-sitting doll among Halloween decorations at Marshalls.

The family has had a profound influence on American comics, cinema and television, and it has also been seen as an inspiration for the goth subculture and its fashion. According to The Telegraph, the Addamses "are one of the most iconic families in American history, up there with the Kennedys". Similarly, Time has compared "the relevance and the cultural reach" of the family with those of the Kennedys and the Roosevelts, "so much a part of the American landscape that it's difficult to discuss the country's history without mentioning them". For TV Guide, which listed the characters in the top ten of the "60 greatest TV families of all time", the Addamses "provid[ed] the design for cartoonish clans to come, like the Flintstones and the Simpsons". Owing to their popularity, the first feature-length adaptation has been identified as a "cult film", while Addams Family Values was listed as one of the "50 best family films" by The Guardian and nominated for the American Film Institute's '100 Years ... 100 Laughs' at the turn of the century. Ricci's portrayal of Wednesday in the film series was ranked one of the "100 greatest movie characters" by Empire, and in 2011 AOL named Morticia one of the "100 most memorable female TV characters".

== See also ==
- The Munsters – A franchise based on a sitcom with a similar premise.
