= The Addams Family (video game) =

1992 video game

- Amiga box art
- Developer: Ocean Software (Note: Game Gear and Master System versions developed by Arc Developments.)
- Publishers: Ocean Software; Genesis/Mega Drive; Acclaim Entertainment (Note: Released under the Flying Edge brand.)
- Designer: Warren Lancashire
- Programmer: James Higgins
- Artists: Warren Lancashire; Simon Butler
- Composer: Jonathan Dunn
- Series: The Addams Family
- Platform: List: NES, Game Boy, Super NES, ZX Spectrum, Amiga, Atari ST, Commodore 64, Amstrad CPC, Genesis/Mega Drive, Game Gear, Master System
- Release: January 1992: NES; NA: January 1992; PAL: 1992 Game Boy; NA: January 1992; EU: 1992 Super NES; NA: March 1992; PAL: November 19, 1992 ZX Spectrum; UK: April 1992 Amiga; EU: May 1992 Atari ST, C64, CPC; EU: 1992 Genesis/Mega Drive; NA: October 1993; EU: November 1993 Game Gear; EU: December 1993; NA: 1994 Master System; EU: December 1993
- Genres: Action-adventure, platform
- Mode: Single-player

The Addams Family is a 1992 action-adventure platform game based on the 1991 film of the same name. Developed and published by Ocean Software, it was released for home consoles such as the Super Nintendo Entertainment System, computers such as the Amiga, and handheld consoles such as the Game Boy.

The player assumes the role of Gomez Addams. His mission is to rescue other members of the Addams family from the clutches of Abigail Craven, who, alongside The Judge and the family attorney Tully Alford, is attempting to seize the Addams' wealth. The game is non-linear, with the player moving throughout the mansion's many inside and outside areas, some of which are hidden. Enemies include bosses each holding a member of the Addams Family hostage, making them necessary to defeat. Power-ups, extra lives, and money are also obtainable.

Ocean, a leader in the market of video game adaptations of films in the late 1980s, began development of the tie-in for The Addams Family film in April 1991, before the film switched studios from 20th Century Fox to Paramount Pictures. It was originally planned to be a puzzle game for computer consoles until Paramount requested that Ocean develop a version for the SNES. The final result was that all versions, including the computer versions, were platformers with the same storyline, setting and objective. The game was critically well-received for its graphics, sound, and music, but was widely considered to be a derivative platformer of its time.

== Gameplay and plot ==
The player controls Gomez Addams and navigates through various locations of the mansion.

The Addams Family is a side-scrolling action-adventure platform game. The story involves Abigail Craven scheming to obtain The Addams Family's secret wealth. To do this, she brainwashes Uncle Fester, who has just lost his memory, into being an ally. She is also aided by The Judge and the Addams' family attorney, Tully Alford, who takes control of the mansion. Morticia Addams, Pugsley Addams, Wednesday Addams, and Granny go to the house to meet with Tully about the property, only to be kidnapped by Abigail. When Gomez Addams arrives home, he discovers that the other family members are missing. To save his family, Gomez runs, jumps, and squats his way throughout the large mansion infested with ghosts, mutants, monsters, bats and rabbits, as well as stage hazards like stars, swinging clock pendulums, and fire lakes.

Puzzle-solving is also involved in saving the Addams family members. For example, Wednesday is found in an ice-themed freezing area and it is up to the player to figure out how to free her. Granny is also trapped in a stove which is turned off by a switch that the player must find. The Amstrad CPC game has many doors that can only be unlocked by keys hidden throughout the mansion. In most versions, the underground chambers must be activated to save Morticia; Lurch plays a tune in the Music Room that activates it, but only when Wednesday, Pugsley, Granny and Uncle Fester are rescued and meet up in the room. In the NES version, Gomez has to collect $1,000,000 to save Morticia. The Judge is the final boss.

The Addams Family is similar to open-ended titles such as The Legend of Zelda and Metroid (both 1986), as the player has the freedom to navigate both the indoor and outdoor areas of the mansion in any order. The core of the game is in the mansion's Hall of Stairs, consisting of the front entrance and six doorways. The rooms these doors lead to include the kitchen, the games room, and the portrait gallery, and each feature around 40–50 screens. A huge bird is located in the outside garden and serves as a boss. One of the doors near the front is invisible and leads to Pugsley's Den, which has power-ups, money, and five 1-UPs. It also has another secret area containing 27 lives. Throughout the mansion, there are certain areas holding extra lives and money, as well as unnoticeable spots in non-secret locations with the same sort of bonuses. There are also boxes where Thing provides clues, such as how objects in a room work and which place to go next.

Similar to Mario games, Gomez kills enemies and bosses by stomping on them, and collects power-ups and coins. Power-ups include a sword, a golf club that can shoot balls, the fezi-copter hat that makes Gomez fly, and shoes that increases his speed. All of these can be held from door-to-door except for the fezi-copter, which disintegrates by the time Gomez enters a door. The Game Boy version additionally has four collectible potions, left around by Pugsley, that are needed to access certain areas. The Wolfman potion increases his speed, Frankie gives him invincibility that lasts for 10 hits with enemies, Sea Monster enables him to swim underwater, and Drac makes him fly. In the Game Boy release, power-up items are limited in energy, meaning power vials must be collected to keep them in use.

In some versions, Gomez's maximum health is represented by heart containers, starting with two. Up to three additional heart containers, as well extra lives, can be collected. Collecting $25 fills one of the containers ($50 in the Amiga version), and $100 gives the player an extra life. The player also has unlimited continues, although is placed at the Hall of Stairs once all the lives are lost. A password is earned after defeating a boss, which also rewards the player with either one of the Addams family members or a heart container. The NES, Game Boy, and CPC releases uses different representations of health. The NES version has a regular life bar, while the Game Boy and CPC version uses a system with a consistent amount of hearts.

In the CPC version, Gomez must survive for 60 seconds after he finds an Addams family member.

== Development ==
In the late 1980s, British developer Ocean Software gained a reputation for being the leader, and go-to producer, of game tie-ins for computers and consoles, such as RoboCop (1988), Batman (1989), Total Recall (1990), RoboCop 3 (1991), and Hudson Hawk (1991). In April 1991, they began development on a tie-in for an upcoming film based on The Addams Family. This was before the project switched studios from 20th Century Fox to Paramount Pictures.

The game was first announced by ACE magazine in June 1991. Shortly before the film's release, film industry journalist David J. Fox reported a widespread trend of video game tie-ins for major film projects. He attributed this to studios looking for other sources of income and promotional methods to make up for a rising decline in theater attendance. In 1990, Nintendo reported customers spending $2.4 billion on video games, nearly half of the $5 billion spent on movie tickets the same year. The Addams Family's business plan was different from most others, in that the game was released a month after the film. Only one other project around the same time had a similar strategy: the video game adaptation of Steven Spielberg's Hook, which was published by Sony Imagesoft.

The team consisted of James Higgins as coder, Warren Lancashire for game design and graphics, Simon Butler for additional graphics, and Jonathan Dunn for music. Ocean only had the script to work with throughout development. Since most of the story was dictated by character dialogue, it was tough to incorporate it into a video game. They ultimately chose to base the game on the film's last 20 minutes. Higgins said it was natural that the game, which starred a gothic family, would have horror fiction tropes such as skulls and ghosts as enemies. However, Butler's surreal sense led to the creation of enemies like the flying teacups and tricycle-riding frogs.

The Addams Family was originally planned to be a puzzle game released only on computer systems. However, within two weeks of development, Paramount asked Ocean to create a port of the game for the SNES. After finishing the SNES version in November 1991, Ocean went back to the code for the computer version and, with a console game-influenced viewpoint, disliked it to the point of rejecting it. They found it had too little graphical colorfulness, too slow of a frame rate, and no parallax scrolling. Additionally, with a lack of "console-style" products released on systems like the Amiga, Ocean wanted to be the first company to develop and release a 16-bit computer game that was similar to a Mario platformer well before development began. Thus, they made the computer ports identical to the console releases, "arcadey" platformers with pickup items, extra lives, level warps, secret areas, and bonuses. Two other console-type platform games would be released on computers around the same time as The Addams Family: Fire and Ice and James Pond 2: Codename: RoboCod. Reviews of the 16-bit computer versions of The Addams Family constantly brought up those two titles as a result.

== Reception ==
Reception (Console releases of 16-bit version)

Review scores
Publication	Score	
Publication	Sega Genesis	SNES
Aktueller Software Markt	5/12	10/12
Computer and Video Games	73/100	N/A
Electronic Gaming Monthly	N/A	5/10; 7/10; 6/10; 7/10
Game Players	6/10	N/A
GamePro	4/5; 4.5/5; 4.5/5; 5/5	5/5; 5/5; 5/5; 5/5
Hyper	74/100	N/A
Mean Machines	N/A	89%
Mega Fun	70%	N/A
Nintendo Life	N/A	7/10
Nintendo Power	N/A	4/5; 3.6/5; 3.3/5; 3.6/5
Player One	N/A	94%
Super Play	N/A	82%
Total!	N/A	70%
Video Games (DE)	71%	73%
Mega	25%	N/A
Super Gamer	N/A	84%

Reception (Computer versions)

Review scores
Publication	Score
Amiga Action	AMI: 94%
Amiga Computing	AMI: 91%
Amiga Force	AMI: 83%
Amiga Format	AMI: 78%
Amiga Power	AMI: 88%
Amstrad Action	PC: 90%
Crash	ZX: 91%
Joystick	AST: 97%
ST Action	AST: 93%
ST Format	AST: 74%
Your Sinclair	ZX: 86%
Zero	AMI: 90/100
Zzap!64	C64: 57%
Commodore Format	C64: 92%

Reception (8-bit console version)

Review scores
Publication	Score			
Publication	Game Boy	Game Gear	Master System	NES
ACE	775/1000	N/A	N/A	N/A
AllGame	N/A	N/A	N/A	3/5
Aktueller Software Markt	6/12	N/A	N/A	N/A
Computer and Video Games	52/100	80/100	N/A	N/A
GamePro	N/A	3.5/5; 3.5/5; 3.5/5; 3.5/5	N/A	2/5; 1/5; 3/5; 2/5; 2/5
Jeuxvideo.com	15/20	N/A	N/A	N/A
Joypad	77%	93%	N/A	N/A
Nintendo Power	3.1/5; 2.7/5; 2.9/5; 2.8/5	N/A	N/A	3.3/5; 3.1/5; 2.9/5; 3.1/5
Player One	N/A	N/A	69%	N/A
Total!	52%	N/A	N/A	55%
Video Games (DE)	56%	50%	N/A	63%
Sega Power	N/A	79%	79%	N/A
Sega Visions	N/A	3/5	N/A	N/A

The general consensus was that The Addams Family was good in terms of gameplay, graphics and sound, but offered nothing special or original to the platform genre. Total! journalist Andy, reviewing the NES version, opined that even considering it was a typical platformer, it was disappointing for an Ocean game given the standard set by their NES adaptation of Hook. However, reviewers also felt its level design had enough thrilling elements to keep the player's attention, such as humorous enemy sprites, hidden areas, creative power-ups, and a constant barrage of foes.

The high difficulty was frequently discussed. Rod Lawton of Amstrad Action reported the CPC port to be filled with brutal timing puzzles and constant respawning enemies. Reviews noted the large amount of areas to traverse and master, praising how they contributed to the challenge level and lastability. Amiga Computing's Jonathan Maddock suspected it was larger than any other Amiga title. Both Andy and Nintendo Life journalist Jamie O'Neill wrote that figuring out which actions to take, such as the right order of areas to traverse, was a major key to success. O'Neill said the freedom in moving around the very large mansion fools the player into thinking that progress is being made. While some reviewers found the controls responsive and intuitive, others were critical of how slippery Gomez was, and also criticized the collision detection for being imperfect and too harsh on the player.

Sharp called the graphics "humorous and a joy to watch on screen". A common positive was the background, specifically their amount of detail, color, diversity of subjects, and the smooth parallax scrolling. The sprites were also spotlighted for their animation and cute style. Reviewers appreciated the upbeat music, such as O'Neill who also highlighted the bass parts in the SNES version. Maddock was surprised by how uncannily the Amiga executed the Addams Family theme, but the Amiga version's rejection of backgrounds in the SNES version, which the Amiga did not have the speed to handle parallax scrolling, garnered a mixed response. Amiga Format's Neil West felt it detached the game of atmosphere, while it was easier to see sprites without the backdrops for Maddock.

Reviews of the game on 8-bit consoles were less favorable, common complaints being the lack of gameplay depth, challenge, and average visuals and audio. GamePro journalist The Spam Weasal claimed the NES version had some of the worst music for the console. ACE's Gary White, although more positive towards the Game Boy port, reported an overwhelming amount of enemies being thrown at the player the instant the game began, making it difficult for novice players to adjust themselves to it. He was also annoyed by Gomez' "strangely restrained" jumps and the overabundance of platforms.
