= Addams Family Values (video game) =

1995 video game

- North American SNES box art
- Developer: Ocean Software
- Publisher: Ocean Software
- Producer: Ian Turnbull
- Designer: Don McDermott
- Programmers: John May; Phillip Trelford; Robert Walker
- Artists: John Hackleton; Don McDermott
- Writers: Nigel Kershaw; Don McDermott
- Composer: Keith Tinman
- Series: The Addams Family
- Platforms: Super NES, Mega Drive
- Release: Super NES: NA: February 1995; EU: May 1995; Mega Drive: EU: May 1995
- Genre: Action-adventure
- Mode: Single-player

Addams Family Values is a 1995 action-adventure game based on the 1993 film of the same name, developed and published by Ocean Software for the Super NES (in North America and Europe) and Mega Drive (in Europe only).

== Plot ==
The player takes the role of Uncle Fester as he searches for his recently kidnapped baby nephew Pubert E. Addams. On the way, he receives help from The Addams Family and other characters.

== Gameplay ==
Addams Family Values is an action-adventure game with slight role-playing elements. The players control Fester by moving him around, fighting regular enemies and bosses, talking to members of Addams household, and solving puzzles. There are eight dungeons players can explore with a handful of side quests.

== Reception ==
Reception

Review scores
Publication	Score
GameFan	SNES: 258/300
GamesMaster	SNES: 82/100
M! Games	SMD: 77%
Mean Machines Sega	SMD: 74/100
Mega Fun	SMD & SNES: 75%
Nintendo Life	SNES: 8/10
Nintendo Power	SNES: 13.4/20
Official Nintendo Magazine	SNES: 90/100
Total!	SNES: 80/100
Video Games (DE)	SMD & SNES: 62%
Games World	SMD & SNES: 69%
Sega Magazine	SMD: 87/100
Sega Power	SMD: 52%

In 1995, Total! ranked the game 71st on their list of the "Top 100 SNES Games".
