= The Addams Family Theme =

Theme for the 1964 TV series

The theme for the 1964 TV series The Addams Family was written and arranged by longtime Hollywood film and television composer Vic Mizzy. The song's arrangement was dominated by a harpsichord and a bass clarinet, and featured finger-snaps as percussive accompaniment. Actor Ted Cassidy, using his "Lurch" voice, punctuated the lyrics with the words "neat", "sweet", and "petite". Mizzy's theme was popular enough to enjoy a single release, though it failed to make the national charts.

The closing theme was similar, but was instrumental only and featured such instruments as a triangle, a wooden block, a siren whistle, and a duck call.

== Other cover versions ==
- Mexican instrumental rock-and-roll band Los Belmonts' version entitled "Los locos Adams" in 1965.
- Uruguayan instrumental rock-and-roll band Los Iracundos' version entitled "La familia Adams" in 1965.

== See also ==
- "Addams Groove" – a single performed by hip-hop artist Hammer that was released as the theme song to the 1991 film The Addams Family.
- "My Family" – a single performed by Migos, Karol G, Snoop Dogg, Rock Mafia as the theme song to the 2019 film The Addams Family.
- "Black No. 1 (Little Miss Scare-All)" – a single by goth metal band Type O Negative that includes a short reference of the theme.

== Legacy ==
Charles Addams loved the show's theme more than the show itself. The song has become popular as a staple of The Addams Family. In 2007, it was used as the theme for an advert for Tetley Tea. In May 2012, Horrible Histories parodied "The Addams Family Theme", singing about the Borgia family.

The theme's instrumental has been used as rally music in North American sports.

In the 2022 series Wednesday, the code to enter the sanctum of the secret society of the Nightshades is to snap twice (similar to how snapping twice is part of the song). Christina Aguilera recorded her own version of the song for The Addams Family 2 soundtrack in 2021.
