= Barbara Jean Day =

American ex-wife of Charles Addams (1919–2007)

- Born: July 7, 1919; Chicago, Illinois, United States
- Died: August 20, 2007 (aged 88); Oak Bluffs, Massachusetts, United States
- Education: New York University
- Spouses: Charles Addams (m. 1943; div. 1950) John Hersey (m. 1958; died 1993)

Barbara Jean Hersey (previously Addams, née Day; July 7, 1919 – August 6, 2007) was an American woman best known for having been married to two different famous people, first Charles Addams – the creator of The Addams Family – and then journalist John Richard Hersey.

== Biography ==
Barbara Jean Day was born on July 7, 1919, in Chicago. In Day's 2008 eulogy, her daughter Dr. Brook Hersey writes, "I think her Midwestern roots are an important element of who she was. She was direct, and down to earth, and always maintained an understated skepticism towards material excess, cultural elitism, towards any kind of snobbery, really." Barbara was president of her high school's math club and had a natural talent for complex word games. After graduating college, Barbara worked and lived in New Jersey, and she met cartoonist Charles Addams in late 1942 traveling on the train from Westfield. After she took time off work to attend his mother's funeral, Charles got serious about Barbara and married her four months later; Barbara was 23, Charles was 30.

Contrary to popular belief, Barbara was not the inspiration for the Morticia Addams character in Addams' comic strip. In October 2016, H. Kevin Miserocchi, executive director of the Tee and Charles Addams Foundation contacted the Vanderbilt Cup Races website (after a post on Charles Addams' love of racing and vintage cars) to set the record straight. "Charlie created the character who became known as Morticia in 1933, many years before he married Barbara or either of his two other wives, all of whom had that look." In a now famous Life magazine spread, Charles poses around town with Barbara—the most prolific photo being that of Charles supposedly sketching her for another Morticia comic. This photo was staged. After 8 years of marriage, Barbara and Charles divorced after alleged womanizing and Charles' dislike of small children, though in the years following, Addams spoke fondly of her. Wanting to distance herself from the Morticia comparisons, Barbara cut her hair into a page-boy style.

In 1958, Barbara married writer and journalist John Richard Hersey, one of the first practitioners of New Journalism and author of Hiroshima. She remained with Hersey until his death in 1993, and together they had one daughter, Brook Hersey. Barbara died at her Massachusetts home on August 20, 2007; she was 88 years old. She is survived by her daughter, her three step children, and her granddaughter.
