= The Addams Family: An Evilution =

2010 nonfiction book by H. Kevin Miserocchi

- The cover, with the cartoon "Leaving Home".
- Author: H. Kevin Miserocchi
- Illustrator: Charles Addams
- Language: English
- Publisher: "Pomegranate".
- Publication date: March 31, 2010
- Publication place: United States/Canada
- Pages: 224 pages

The Addams Family: An Evilution is a book about the "evilution" of The Addams Family characters created by American cartoonist Charles Addams. The book was made to celebrate The Addams Family musical that opened on Broadway in April 2010.

An Evilution is the first book to trace The Addams Family history. It presents more than 200 cartoons created by Addams during his career, including some that were never published. It is arranged by H. Kevin Miserocchi, director of the Tee and Charles Addams Foundation. Each chapter of the book shows a chronology of each character’s evolution throughout the television shows, movies, and other depictions of the family. The chapters are also headed by Addams's own character descriptions that were originally used for the TV show producers.

== Opening note ==
"Charles Addams set out not to create a family but rather to suggest how society as a whole might interpret characters bent on the darker side while living lives similar to those embracing the light . . . Always described as strange, eerie, odd, and spooky, the Family nevertheless had many of the same joys and woes that all families experience—for example, keeping the house in order and seeing that the children take responsibility for the welfare of their pets. How delightfully refreshing that they had a trapdoor and a secret panel for the carpenter to fix, that the children arrived home from camp in pet carriers, and that at least one pet was a small dragon!"

— H. Kevin Miserocchi

== Chapter list ==
- Preface/Introduction
- The Family
- Morticia
- Gomez
- Wednesday and the boy, Pugsley
- Lurch, the butler
- Granny Frump (a.k.a. Grandma Frump)
- Uncle Fester
- Thing
- Relatives & Family Friends
- A House to "die for"
