= The Addams Family (video game series) =

Video game series

There have been seven video games based on The Addams Family television series and films, released between 1989 and 2022 on various home video game consoles.

== The Addams Family ==
The Addams Family
- Developers: Ocean Software, ICOM Simulations (TurboGrafx-CD)
- Publishers: Ocean Software, NEC (TurboGrafx-CD)
- Platforms: NES, Master System, Game Gear, Mega Drive/Genesis, Super NES, Game Boy, Atari ST, Commodore 64, Amiga, TurboGrafx-CD, ZX Spectrum, Amstrad CPC
- Release: 1992
- Genre: Platform
- Mode: Single-player

The Addams Family is a platform game released by Ocean in 1992. The game was released for Mega Drive / Genesis, Super NES, Amiga and Atari ST. It is based on the 1991 movie of the same name. Other titles based on the film were released for other platforms.

The characters bear resemblances to their movie counterparts.

Not to be confused with the other game named The Addams Family that was also based on the movie and released for TurboGrafx-16 in 1991.

== Addams Family Values ==
Addams Family Values is an action adventure game based on the film of the same name produced by Ocean Software and released in 1995 for the Sega Mega Drive and Super NES.

== The New Addams Family ==
The New Addams Family
- Developer: 7th Sense
- Publisher: Microids
- Platform: Game Boy Color
- Release: NA: 17 December 2001; EU: 8 February 2002
- Genre: Adventure
- Mode: Single-player

The New Addams Family Series is an adventure video game released for Nintendo's Game Boy Color in 2001. It was developed by 7th Sense and published by Microids exclusively in Europe. Titus Interactive was going to release the game in America with the title The New Addams Family, but the American version was cancelled. It is based on The New Addams Family television series that ran from 1998 to 1999.

=== Story ===
The family mansion is going to be demolished and replaced by an amusement park, and therefore the family will be evicted. While the adults are trying to find a solution, the children roam the house helping out in their own peculiar way. Only if they find the estate ownership documents will the contractors be stopped.

=== Gameplay ===
The player controls both Pugsley and Wednesday Addams, and must navigate the house, collecting items, solving puzzles and conversing with other members of the family.

== The Addams Family Mystery Mansion ==
There is also a 2019 mobile game called The Addams Family Mystery Mansion for Android and iOS. It was produced by pixowl/Animoca Brands.

=== Story ===
Morticia and Gomez return home to their mansion to find the rest of their family missing.

== The Addams Family: Mansion Mayhem ==
The Addams Family: Mansion Mayhem is a 3D platforming adventure game released on September 24, 2021 for the PlayStation 4, Nintendo Switch, PC, and Xbox One/Series X and S. It was developed by PHL Collective and published by Outright Games. The game's art and assets are based on 2019's The Addams Family and 2021's The Addams Family 2 films.
