= Fester's Quest =

1989 video game

- Developer: Sunsoft
- Publisher: Sunsoft
- Composer: Naoki Kodaka
- Platforms: Nintendo Entertainment System, PlayChoice-10
- Release: NA: September 1989; EU: September 14, 1990
- Genres: Run and gun, adventure
- Mode: Single-player

Fester's Quest (also known as Uncle Fester's Quest or The Addams Family: Uncle Fester's Quest) is a video game for the Nintendo Entertainment System based on the 1960s television series The Addams Family. It was released in 1989 in North America and 1990 in Europe.

== Story ==
One night, a UFO arrives in the city where the Addams Family lives and begins beaming up the residents. However, Grandmama casts a spell on herself and the other family members to protect them, having predicted the invasion. Patriarch Gomez Addams guards the family mansion while the others scatter throughout the city, and Uncle Fester sets out to save the townspeople from the aliens.

== Gameplay ==
Fester's Quest is a shoot 'em up game that takes place in three overhead areas (the streets, the sewers, and the UFO platform) and six buildings where the hallways are viewed from a 3D perspective.

Along the way, Fester encounters other members of the Addams Family in seven houses (plus the Addams mansion via a secret path through the trees behind the mansion): Thing (three times), Wednesday, Gomez, Morticia, Grandmama, and Pugsley, all of whom help him by giving him different weapons and items. Use of one particular item, the Noose, will summon Lurch to destroy all enemies on the screen.

Fester must travel through the city sewers to reach areas that are otherwise inaccessible due to aboveground obstacles. He may enter certain buildings, which transform the game from its standard overhead view into a 3D mode of play akin to a dungeon crawl. Five of these buildings each house an enormous Alien Boss character, which upon defeat will supply Fester with a puzzle piece and a picture of the alien's UFO, and refill all of his items. After defeating a boss, Fester will leave the building and be unable to backtrack through it to previously visited areas. Once all five bosses are defeated, Fester must board the UFO and defeat one last boss in order to stave off the invasion.

The North American release has a feature that makes Fester's bullets collide with walls and objects, making it more difficult to hit enemies compared to the European release.

== Reception ==
Initial and retrospective reviews

Review scores
Publication	Score
AllGame	2/5
Computer and Video Games	56%
Electronic Gaming Monthly	5/10
Joystick	70%
Nintendo Life	1/10
Nintendo Power	4.45/5 (Note: Nintendo Power gave Fester's Quest two 4.7/5 scores for graphics/sound and theme/fun and two 4.2/5 scores for play control and challenge.)
Official Nintendo Magazine	57%
Player One	70%
Total!	14%
Super Gamer	34%
VideoGame	5/5

The French magazine Player One stated that Fester's Quest was great for fans of the franchise, although did suffer from short game length, "motley" visuals, and occasional slowdown. Paul Glancey of CVG, on the other hand, dismissed the game for its "flickery and unimpressive" visuals, lack of humor, and "unrewarding" mindless shooting gameplay consisting of constantly-respawning enemies. Critics from Electronic Gaming Monthly felt that while the game had alright graphics and "awesome" and "very good" music, its difficulty was "unbalanced" as it consisted of too-little real action and variety, very easy mini-quests, and "next to impossible" bosses.

GamesRadar ranked it as the 73rd worst game ever made. The staff criticized its excessive difficulty and lack of comicality. Conversely, IGN ranked Fester's Quest 45th on its Top 100 NES Games list. Fester's Quest has sold one million copies.
