= Addams Family Values (score) =

Addams Family Values: The Original Orchestral Score

Soundtrack album by Marc Shaiman
- Released: December 7, 1993
- Genre: Film score
- Length: 38:14
- Label: Varèse Sarabande
- Producer: Marc Shaiman

Professional ratings
Review scores
Source	Rating
Allmusic	2/5 stars
Music from Movies	4/5 stars

Addams Family Values: The Original Orchestral Score was one of the two soundtrack albums released in support of the 1993 film Addams Family Values, the sequel to the 1991 film The Addams Family. The Original Orchestral Score featured selections from the film's incidental score music, produced by Academy Award nominated composer Marc Shaiman and conducted by Artie Kane. The other Addams Family Values soundtrack, Addams Family Values: Music from the Motion Picture, features hip-hop and R&B recordings.

== Track listing ==
1. "It's an Addams!" – 2:05
2. "Sibling Rivalry" – 3:01
3. "Love on a Tombstone" – 1:01
4. "Debbie Meets the Family" – 2:17
5. "Camp Chippewa/"Camp Chippewa Song"" [*] – 1:36
6. "Fester's in Love" – 0:32
7. "The Big Date" – 2:28
8. "The Tango" – 2:44
9. "Fester and Debbie's Courtship" – 2:42
10. "Wednesday and Joel's Courtship" – 1:18
11. "The Honeymoon Is Over" – 1:27
12. "Escape from Debbie" – 3:27
13. "Eat Us" – 1:02
14. "Wednesday's Revolt" – 2:26
15. "Debbie's Big Scene" – 6:59
16. "Some Time Later" – 3:09

* This track has Shaiman and Kane sharing performance credits. All other tracks credit Kane alone.
