= The Addams Family (2019 film) =

2019 film by Conrad Vernon and Greg Tiernan

- Theatrical release poster
- Directed by: Greg Tiernan; Conrad Vernon
- Screenplay by: Matt Lieberman
- Story by: Matt Lieberman; Erica Rivinoja; Conrad Vernon
- Based on: The Addams Family by Charles Addams
- Produced by: Gail Berman; Conrad Vernon; Alex Schwartz; Alison O'Brien
- Starring: Oscar Isaac; Charlize Theron; Chloë Grace Moretz; Finn Wolfhard; Nick Kroll; Snoop Dogg; Bette Midler; Allison Janney; Elsie Fisher
- Edited by: David Ian Salter
- Music by: Mychael Danna; Jeff Danna
- Production companies: Metro-Goldwyn-Mayer Pictures; Jackal Group; Cinesite Studios
- Distributed by: United Artists Releasing
- Release date: October 11, 2019 (United States)
- Running time: 86 minutes
- Countries: Canada; United States
- Language: English
- Budget: $24 million
- Box office: $204 million

The Addams Family is a 2019 animated supernatural comedy film based on the comic strip characters created by Charles Addams. It was directed by Conrad Vernon and Greg Tiernan, and written by Matt Lieberman. The film stars the voices of Oscar Isaac, Charlize Theron, Chloë Grace Moretz, Finn Wolfhard, Nick Kroll, Snoop Dogg, Bette Midler, and Allison Janney.

The film was theatrically released by United Artists Releasing in the United States and in Canada by Universal Pictures on October 11, 2019. It received mixed reviews from critics, and grossed $204 million against a $24 million budget.

A sequel, The Addams Family 2, was released in 2021.

== Plot ==
An angry mob of villagers, that rejects anything macabre in nature, disrupts the midnight wedding ceremony of Gomez Addams and Morticia Frump and drives them away with the rest of the Addams clan. During the chaos, Grandmama buys Uncle Fester time to evacuate Gomez, Morticia, and Thing. Gomez and Morticia decide to move to New Jersey, a place "no one would be caught dead in." There, Gomez, Morticia, and Thing find their "perfect" home in an abandoned asylum on a hill. They meet Lurch, an escaped mental patient whom they hit when Thing was driving their car, and immediately recruit him as their butler.

Thirteen years later, the Addams family continue to live their gloomy lives in isolation from the outside world. Gomez prepares his son Pugsley for his upcoming "Sabre Mazurka", a rite of passage that every Addams family member takes. Morticia struggles to keep their daughter, Wednesday, from wanting to experience the world outside the mansion after a balloon and confetti appear on their property.

Elsewhere, reality TV host Margaux Needler, who is building a perfect planned community called "Assimilation" so her show will have a successful season finale, discovers the Addams family's household and becomes determined to rid the town of it when the family refuses to change, starting with spreading rumors about the Addamses through social media, claiming that they are freaks. Wednesday then meets Margaux's neglected daughter Parker and persuades Morticia to let her attend junior high school. Pugsley struggles with the complicated traditions and pressure of his Mazurka, even with the guidance of Gomez and Uncle Fester. Grandmama arrives at the house for the event.

At school, Wednesday stands up for Parker and her twin friends Layla and Kayla from the school's bully Bethany and befriends them after she resurrects some dead frogs that they were supposed to dissect and commands them to attack Bethany. Later on, the two discuss their frustrations and change their dressing habits – Parker becomes more gothic and Wednesday dresses more colorfully – to the shock of both of their mothers, with Margaux vowing to destroy the Addamses and Wednesday grounded by Morticia. After an argument with Morticia, Wednesday decides to run away in secret and stay with Parker for a while, which Pugsley inadvertently tells Morticia.

As Cousin Itt arrives at the Addams household, Wednesday and Parker discover a secret room under Parker's house and that Margaux has planted hidden cameras in every house she designed in town. Margaux catches the two and locks them in the attic, but Wednesday breaks them out. Margaux rallies the townsfolk to attack the mansion just as the entire Addams clan arrive for Pugsley's Mazurka.

During the Mazurka, Pugsley fails in front of the whole family, but Gomez admits he forgot to let him be who he is. The mob arrives flinging boulders, severely damaging the mansion and trapping the family inside. Pugsley uses his love of bombs and destruction to defend his family and manages to destroy the mob's trebuchet. Wednesday and Parker join in and help everyone out of the wreckage safely with help of the living tree Ichabod.

Assimilation's civilians realize that the Addamses are not monsters, but a family, as Wednesday and Parker state that everyone is weird in their own unique way, revealing also Margaux's spying on the civilians, who are violated upon hearing this. Margaux gets her comeuppance when her true nature is then exposed during a subsequent tirade against the civilians — demanding they do as she says or be kicked out of town — thanks to Parker live-streaming it on her phone, after which Margaux's agent Glenn informs her their network has cancelled her show because of the bad publicity. As Fester comes up with a compromise for Margaux, Assimilation's civilians offer to make amends with the Addamses.

After they work together to rebuild the mansion, the Addams family and Assimilation's civilians live in peace. Margaux becomes Fester's business partner, selling homes to the other members of the Addams clan, and Pugsley is hailed as an Addams for his defending of the clan.

== Voice cast ==
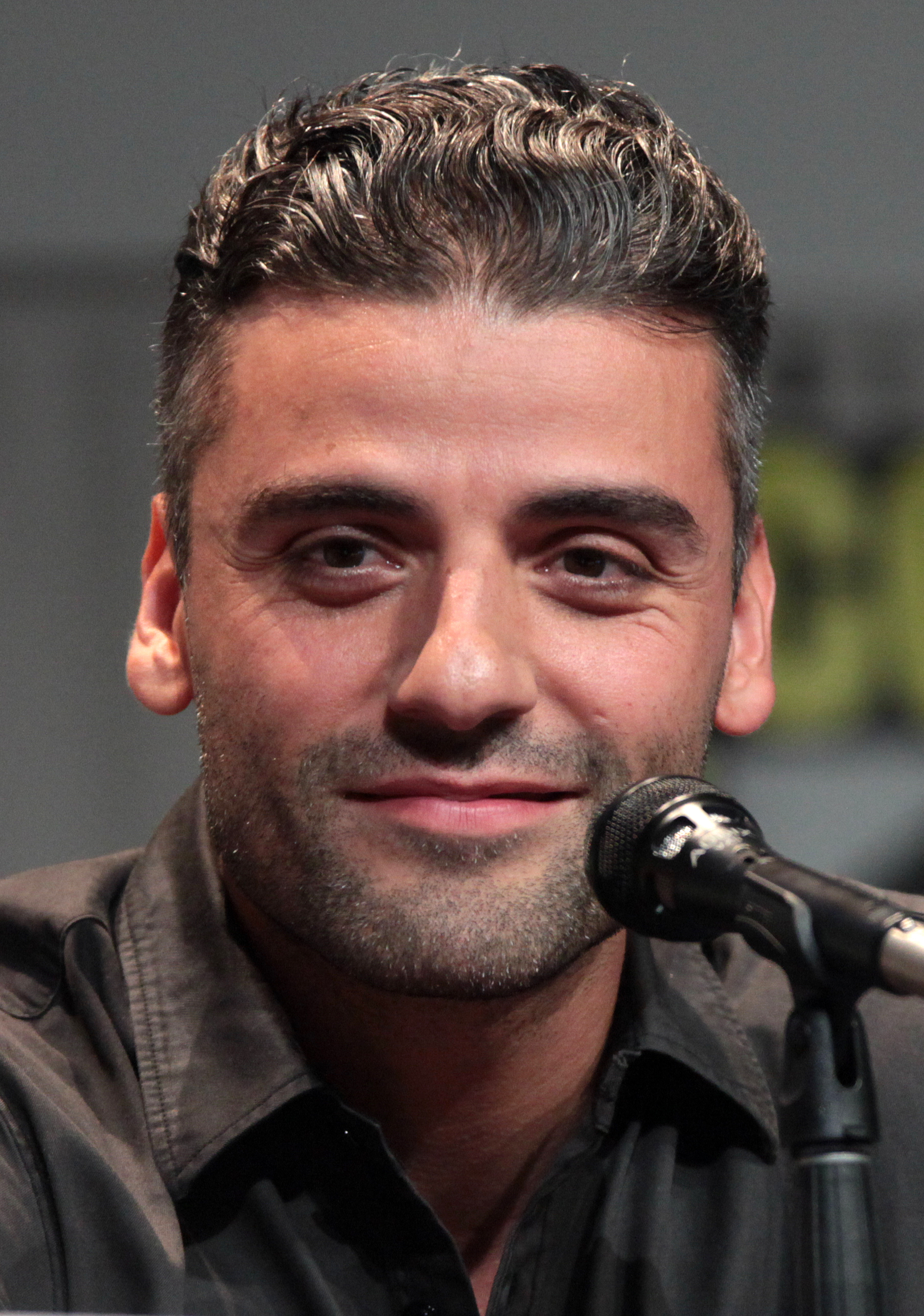
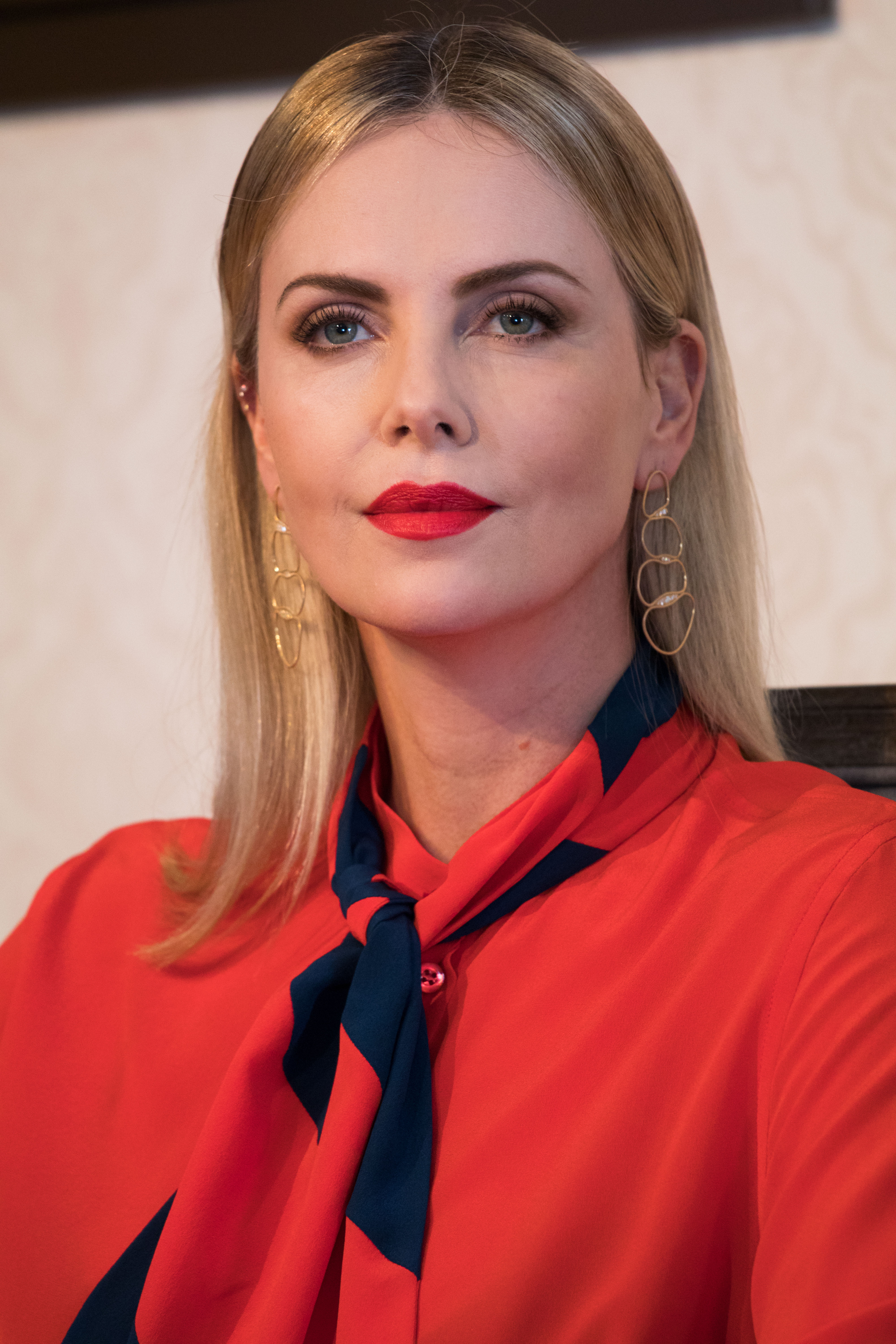
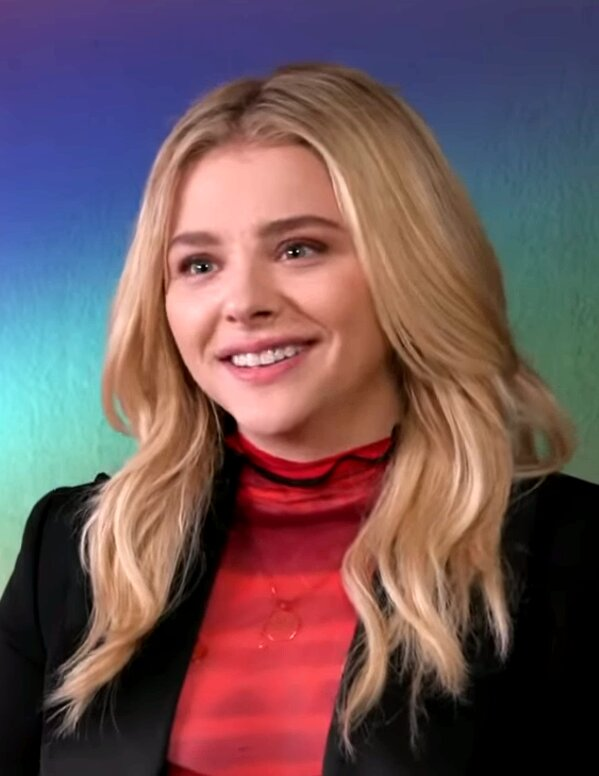
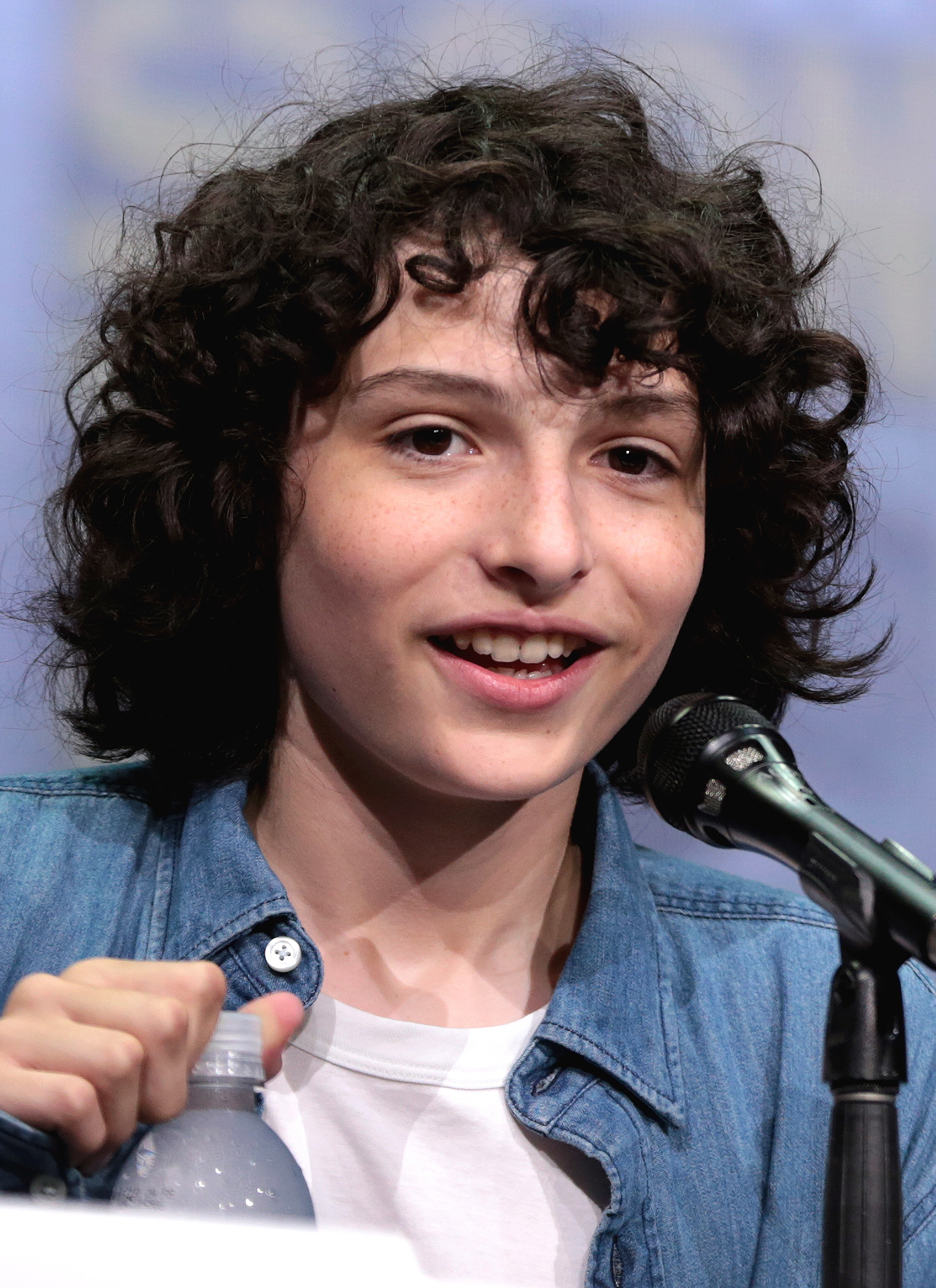
Oscar Isaac, Charlize Theron, Chloë Grace Moretz and Finn Wolfhard voiced Gomez Addams, Morticia Addams, Wednesday Addams, and Pugsley Addams respectively
- Oscar Isaac as Gomez Addams, Morticia's charming and excitable husband, Fester's brother, Wednesday and Pugsley's loving father, and Grandmama's son
- Charlize Theron as Morticia Addams (née Frump), Gomez's calm and elegant wife and Wednesday and Pugsley's loving mother
- Chloë Grace Moretz as Wednesday Addams, Gomez and Morticia's monotonous and cynical daughter, Pugsley's older sister, and a mad science child prodigy.
- Finn Wolfhard as Pugsley Addams, Gomez and Morticia's son and Wednesday's younger brother who has a passion for mischief and destruction
- Nick Kroll as Uncle Fester, Gomez's eccentric older brother, Morticia's brother-in-law, Grandmama's other son, and Wednesday and Pugsley's paternal uncle
- Snoop Dogg as Itt, Gomez and Fester's hairy cousin
- Bette Midler as Grandmama, Gomez and Fester's mother, Wednesday and Pugsley's grandmother
- Allison Janney as Margaux Needler, a sly and greedy reality TV show host, divorcee, and homemaking guru
- Martin Short as Grandpa Frump, Morticia's late father whom she contacts through a séance
- Catherine O'Hara as Grandma Frump, Morticia's late mother whom she contacts through a séance
- Tituss Burgess as Glenn, Margaux's agent
- Jenifer Lewis as Great Auntie Sloom, Grandmama's strict and cold sister, Gomez's aunt, and Wednesday and Pugsley's grandaunt with a missing left eye and stilts under her dress who judges Pugsley's Mazurka
- Elsie Fisher as Parker Needler, Margaux's neglected and rebellious daughter who befriends Wednesday
- Conrad Vernon as:
  - Lurch, the Addams Family's lumbering butler and psyce ward escapee
  - An unnamed priest that presides over Gomez and Morticia's family that is related to them
  - The spirit of the house
  - Dr. Flambé, a devil-like relative of the Addams family who can light his head on fire.
- Aimee Garcia as Denise, a camera operator who works for Margaux
- Scott Underwood as Mitch, a member of Margaux's film crew
- Mikey Madison as Candi the barista, who works in Assimilation
- Chelsea Frei as Bethany, a popular girl who frequently bullies and antagonizes Parker
- Pom Klementieff as Layla and Kayla, twin girls who are Parker's friends
- Deven Green as Ms. Gravely, a teacher at Parker's school
- Maggie Wheeler as Trudy Pickering, an inhabitant of Assimilation
- Harland Williams as:
  - Norman Pickering, an inhabitant of Assimilation and the husband of Trudy
  - Ggerri

== Production ==
In 2010 after Illumination Entertainment acquired the rights to The Addams Family comics, they began work on the film at Universal Pictures as a stop-motion animated film directed by Tim Burton and produced by Chris Meledandri. After development stopped, however, in 2013, Metro-Goldwyn-Mayer (MGM) announced that they would produce the animated film based on The Addams Family comics, with Pamela Pettler then writing the screenplay. On June 6, 2019, it was announced that Bron Creative was co-financing the film with MGM as part of a multi-picture co-financing agreement with the studio. In October 2017, it was announced that the film would be directed and produced by Conrad Vernon. Additionally, Gail Berman, Alex Schwartz, and Alison O'Brien also produced the film. Matt Lieberman wrote the finished screenplay, with story by credit for Lieberman, Erica Rivinoja, and Vernon. The film was animated by Cinesite Studios and Nitrogen Studios with Tabitha Shick overseeing it for MGM. In December 2017, it was reported that Oscar Isaac was in talks to voice the role of Gomez Addams in the film. On June 5, 2018, Isaac was officially cast, alongside Charlize Theron, Allison Janney, Bette Midler, Chloë Grace Moretz, Finn Wolfhard and Nick Kroll. Jenna Ortega also auditioned for the role of Wednesday. On July 24, 2018, Aimee Garcia joined the voice cast. On August 30, 2018, Elsie Fisher was added as well. On November 23, 2018, Catherine O'Hara and Martin Short were added as Morticia's parents, On August 7, 2019, Snoop Dogg, Tituss Burgess, and Jenifer Lewis joined as Cousin Itt, Glenn, and Great Auntie Sloom, respectively.

== Music ==
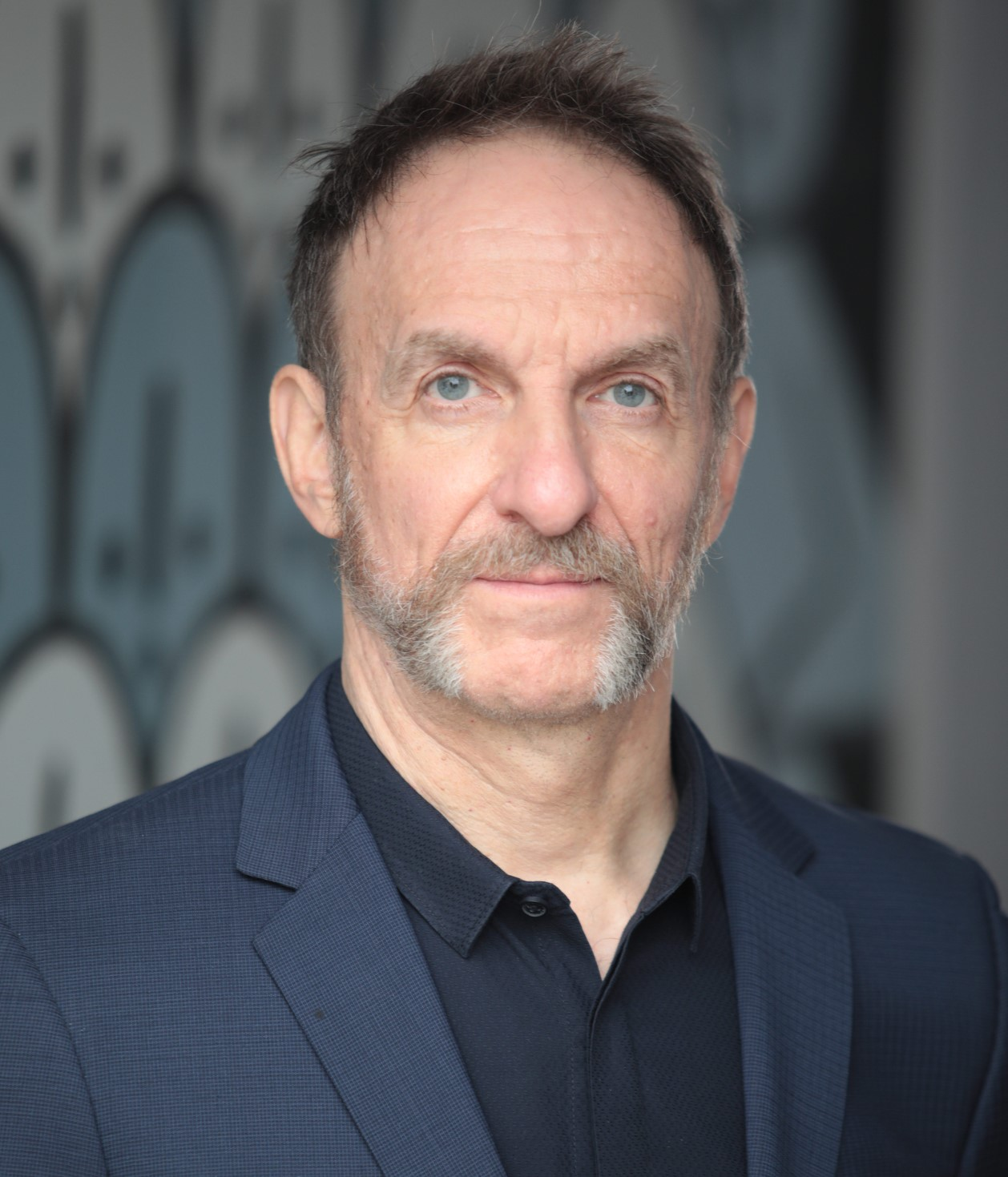
Mychael Danna and Jeff Danna composed the film's score

Migos, Karol G, Snoop Dogg, and Rock Mafia recorded a song for the film called "My Family", which was released on September 13, 2019, and plays during the end credits; while Christina Aguilera released the song "Haunted Heart" from the film's soundtrack on September 27, 2019, which plays in the film's opening. HeathisHuman created an updated version of Vic Mizzy's original theme song that plays at the film's ending.

== Marketing ==
Metro-Goldwyn-Mayer (MGM) launched the film with a global promotion partner campaign worth $150 million, their largest ever outside the 007 franchise. They spent a total of $72 million on prints and advertisements for the film.

== Release ==
=== Theatrical ===
The film was theatrically released by Metro-Goldwyn-Mayer (MGM) through United Artists Releasing (UAR) in North America on October 11, 2019, with Universal Pictures handling the international rights. It was previously set for October 18, 2019 before being moved up to October 11, 2019, to avoid direct competition with Maleficent: Mistress of Evil.

=== Home media ===
The film was released by Universal Pictures Home Entertainment digitally on December 24, 2019, followed by a DVD and Blu-ray release on January 21, 2020.

== Reception ==
=== Box office ===
The Addams Family grossed $100 million in the United States and Canada and $104 million in other territories for a worldwide total of $204 million. Deadline Hollywood calculated the net profit of the film to be $76 million, when factoring together all expenses and revenues.

In the United States and Canada, the film was released alongside Gemini Man and Jexi and was projected to gross $28–30 million from 4,007 theaters in its opening weekend. The film made $9.7 million on its first day including $1.25 million from Thursday night previews. It went on to debut to $30.3 million, finishing second behind holdover Joker. It made $16.3 million in its second weekend, $12 million in its third and $8.2 million in its fourth, finishing fourth, third and sixth, respectively.

=== Critical response ===
On review aggregation website Rotten Tomatoes, the film holds an approval rating of 46% and an average rating of 5.3/10, based on 159 reviews. The website's critical consensus reads, "The Addams Family's starry voice cast and eye-catching animation aren't enough to outweigh its saccharine handling of the delightfully dark source material." On Metacritic, the film has a weighted average score of 46 out of 100, based on 22 critics, indicating "mixed or average reviews". Audiences polled by CinemaScore gave the film an average grade of "B+" on an A+ to F scale, while PostTrak reported that surveyed children and parents gave it 4 and 3.5 out of 5 stars, respectively.

=== Accolades ===
Year	Award	Category	Nominee	Result
2019	HMMA Award	Best Original Song – Animated Film ("Haunted Heart")	Christina Aguilera (written and performed by); Antonina Armato (written by); Tim James (written by)	Nominated
2021	Saturn Awards	Best Animated Film	The Addams Family	Nominated

== Sequel ==
On October 15, 2019, it was announced by Metro-Goldwyn-Mayer that a sequel was scheduled for release on October 22, 2021, with Conrad Vernon and Greg Tiernan reprising their roles as co-directors, and Cinesite Studios returning as animators. On October 8, 2020, Bill Hader and Javon "Wanna" Walton joined the cast; Hader voices a new character named Cyrus, while Walton replaces Finn Wolfhard as the voice of Pugsley. It was also pushed forward two weeks to October 8, 2021. On January 21, 2021, it was again pushed forward one week to October 1, 2021, allowing another MGM film, No Time to Die to take over the slot. In July 2021, Wallace Shawn was revealed to have voiced a new character for the film. In August 2021, the film shifted its release for a simultaneous premium video on demand rental and theatrical release on the October 1 date, in the United States and Canada, due to the COVID-19 pandemic and the rising cases of the SARS-CoV-2 Delta variant.
