= Addams Family Values =

1993 film by Barry Sonnenfeld

- Theatrical release poster
- Directed by: Barry Sonnenfeld
- Written by: Paul Rudnick
- Based on: Characters by Charles Addams
- Produced by: Scott Rudin
- Starring: Anjelica Huston; Raul Julia; Christopher Lloyd; Joan Cusack; Christina Ricci; Carol Kane
- Cinematography: Donald Peterman
- Edited by: Arthur Schmidt; Jim Miller
- Music by: Marc Shaiman
- Production companies: Paramount Pictures; Scott Rudin Productions
- Distributed by: Paramount Pictures
- Release date: November 19, 1993 (United States)
- Running time: 94 minutes
- Country: United States
- Language: English
- Budget: $47 million
- Box office: $111 million

Addams Family Values is a 1993 American supernatural black comedy film, based on the comic strip characters created by Charles Addams. It is the sequel to The Addams Family (1991). Directed by Barry Sonnenfeld and written by Paul Rudnick, the film features most of the cast members from the original film, including Anjelica Huston, Raul Julia, Christopher Lloyd and Christina Ricci, with Joan Cusack and Carol Kane (replacing Judith Malina) joining the cast. Compared to its predecessor, which retained something of the madcap approach of the 1960s sitcom, Addams Family Values is played more for dark and macabre laughs. The film revolves around the family's adjustments to the birth of new baby Pubert. Subplots include Uncle Fester Addams marrying the new nanny Debbie Jellinsky, who is a serial killer intending to murder him for his inheritance; and teenagers Wednesday and Pugsley Addams being sent to summer camp at Debbie's suggestion.

Addams Family Values was released in the United States on November 19, 1993, by Paramount Pictures. In contrast to its predecessor's mixed reception, the film was well received by critics but it was not as financially successful, with a box office gross of $111 million against a budget of $47 million. In the decades since its release, the film has become acclaimed for its humor and performances. The film was followed by a further sequel, Addams Family Reunion. This was Julia's final film to be released during his lifetime. Julia would die of stomach cancer less than a year later on October 24, 1994.

== Plot ==
Gomez and Morticia Addams have a baby, and name him Pubert. After a number of failed attempts by Pubert's siblings Wednesday and Pugsley to kill him, Gomez and Morticia gently rebuke them and hire a nanny, Debbie Jellinsky, to care for Pubert, unaware that Debbie is a serial killer nicknamed "The Black Widow" who marries and then murders rich bachelors to collect their inheritances. After Debbie seduces Uncle Fester, Wednesday becomes suspicious of Debbie's intentions.

To maintain her cover, Debbie tricks Gomez and Morticia into sending Wednesday and Pugsley to Camp Chippewa, a summer camp managed by the bubbly counselors Gary Granger and Becky Martin-Granger. Wednesday and Pugsley are ostracized by the other campers, including popular and snobbish girl Amanda Buckman, for their macabre appearance and behavior. Joel Glicker, a nerdy bookworm and fellow outcast, becomes attracted to Wednesday.

Debbie and Fester become engaged and get married shortly thereafter. On their honeymoon, Debbie attempts to kill Fester by throwing a boombox into his bathtub but he survives. Frustrated, Debbie forces Fester to cut ties with his family; when Gomez and Morticia try to visit Fester and Debbie, Debbie turns them away. Pubert transforms into a blue-eyed, rosy-cheeked and blond-haired baby. Grandmama attributes this to his disrupted family life, and Gomez becomes horribly depressed. Debbie tries to kill Fester by blowing up their mansion but he survives again. Debbie holds Fester at gunpoint but Thing helps him escape.

Meanwhile at Camp Chippewa, Wednesday is cast as Pocahontas in an upcoming play depicting the first Thanksgiving. When she refuses to participate, she, Pugsley, and Joel are all sent to the camp's "Harmony Hut" and forced to watch hours of saccharine, family-friendly movies and television shows. Afterwards, the three feign cheerfulness, and Wednesday agrees to participate in the play. During the performance, Wednesday breaks from the script and leads the other outcasts to burn down the stage and capture Amanda, Gary, and Becky. Later, Wednesday and Joel share their first kiss before she and Pugsley escape, with Joel staying behind to lead their friends to ensure the camp's permanent destruction.

Fester, Wednesday, and Pugsley return home, and Pubert is restored to his former self. Just then, Debbie arrives, holds them at gunpoint, and straps them into electric chairs. Debbie recounts, using a slide show, how she murdered her parents and her first two husbands for incredibly frivolous and materialistic reasons. Meanwhile, Pubert escapes from his crib and reaches the family via a series of improbable events. As Debbie lowers the switch to electrocute the Addamses, Pubert connects two loose wires, rerouting the electrical current back to Debbie, which electrocutes her so severely that her body is reduced to dust.

Some time later, the Addams family, Cousin Itt, and his wife Margaret Alford gather to celebrate Pubert's first birthday, with Joel also attending. Fester laments Debbie's loss but soon becomes mutually smitten with Dementia, a new nanny that Cousin Itt and Margaret have hired for their child. Out in the family graveyard, Joel attempts to ask Wednesday out by asking about having a future with a husband, though she turns him down. She then tells him Debbie was sloppy at covering up her crimes, and that Wednesday would have scared her husband to death and made sure not to be caught. As he lays flowers on Debbie's grave, a hand emerges from the earth and grabs him, prompting Wednesday to smile as he screams.

== Cast ==
- Anjelica Huston as Morticia Addams, the matriarch of the Addams Family
- Raul Julia as Gomez Addams, the patriarch of the Addams Family
- Christopher Lloyd as Fester Addams, the brother of Gomez
- Christina Ricci as Wednesday Addams, the daughter of Gomez and Morticia
- Christopher Hart as Thing, a disembodied hand that lives with the Addams family
- Carel Struycken as Lurch, the Addams Family's towering butler
- Jimmy Workman as Pugsley Addams, the son of Gomez and Morticia
- Carol Kane as Grandmama Addams, the grandmother of Wednesday and Pugsley. She was previously portrayed by Judith Malina in the first movie.
- John Franklin as Cousin Itt, the cousin of the Addams Family
- Joan Cusack as Debbie Jellinsky, a serial killer who poses as a nanny and becomes a love interest for Uncle Fester
- Dana Ivey as Margaret Alford-Addams, the ex-wife of Tully Alford from the first movie and current wife of Cousin Itt
- David Krumholtz as Joel Glicker, a boy that Wednesday befriends at Camp Chippewa
- Kaitlyn and Kristen Hooper as Pubert Addams, the newborn son of Gomez and Morticia
  - Cheryl Chase provides the vocal effects for Pubert Addams
- Peter MacNicol as Gary Granger, the co-proprietor of Camp Chippewa
- Christine Baranski as Becky Martin-Granger, the co-proprietor of Camp Chippewa
- Mercedes McNab as Amanda Buckman, a snooty camper at Camp Chippewa
- Charles Busch as Cousin Aphasia du Berry, a countess and relative of the Addams Family who attends the wedding of Uncle Fester and Debbie
- Lauren Esterman as Cousin Ophelia Addams, a relative of the Addams Family who attends the wedding of Uncle Fester and Debbie. She was previously portrayed by Allegra Kent in the first film.
- Maureen Sue Levin and Darlene Levin as Flora and Fauna Amor, conjoined twins and the ex-girlfriends of Gomez and Uncle Fester who attend the wedding of Fester and Debbie
- Carol Hankins as Dementia, a nanny hired by Cousin Itt and Margaret
- Steven M. Martin and Douglas Brian Martin as Donald and Dexter Addams, the two-headed relative of the Addams Family who attends the wedding of Uncle Fester and Debbie
- Ryan Holihan as Lumpy Addams, a hunchbacked relative of the Addams Family who attends the wedding of Uncle Fester and Debbie

=== Cameo roles ===
- Director Barry Sonnenfeld and Julie Halston as the parents of Joel Glicker.
- Nathan Lane as the police desk sergeant that Gomez tries to enlist in arresting Debbie for hording Uncle Fester from the rest of the family. Lane would eventually go on to play Gomez in the Addams Family Broadway musical.
- David Hyde Pierce as the delivery room doctor who helps to deliver Pubert
- Peter Graves as America's Most Disgusting Unsolved Crimes anchorman
- Sam McMurray and Harriet Sansom Harris as Mr. and Mrs. Buckman, Amanda's parents
- Ian Abercrombie as a driver
- Chris Ellis as a furniture delivery driver
- Tony Shalhoub as Jorge, a man who Debbie interacts with at a bar
- Cynthia Nixon as Heather, a nanny interviewee

== Production ==
The "family values" in the film's title is a tongue-in-cheek reference by writer Paul Rudnick to a 1992 speech made by then-Vice President Dan Quayle. In the speech, Quayle controversially blamed the 1992 Los Angeles riots on a breakdown of "family values". Production of Addams Family Values began in Los Angeles on February 8, 1993. According to Anjelica Huston, it became increasingly clear during filming that Raul Julia's health was deteriorating. He had trouble eating and was losing weight as a result. He died on October 24, 1994, less than a year after the film was released. Sequoia National Park and the adjacent Sequoia Lake in the Sierra Nevada of California, was the site of the movie's Camp Chippewa.

== Music ==
=== Michael Jackson's involvement ===
American singer Michael Jackson was supposed to feature a song in the film, titled "Family Thing". Despite being nearly completed, it went unused. The song is mostly rumored to have been removed due to the child sexual abuse allegations against Jackson; in reality, it was because of contractual differences with Paramount Pictures. An early version of the song was leaked online in 2023. Jackson is referenced in the film via a poster in the Harmony Hut advertising his 1992 single "Heal the World", which horrifies Joel Glicker (David Krumholtz).

== Reception ==
=== Box office ===
Addams Family Values opened at number 1 at the US box office in its opening weekend with a reported gross of $14,117,545. In its second week, the film dropped to number 2 behind Mrs. Doubtfire, and in its third week to number 3 behind Mrs. Doubtfire and A Perfect World. Its final box office gross in the United States and Canada was $48,919,043, a significant decline from the previous film's domestic total of $113,502,426. Internationally it grossed $62 million, for a worldwide total of $110.9 million.

=== Critical response ===
I'm of the firm belief that the Addams Family are the most loving, caring and connected family that has ever graced the silver screen. They are wildly devoted to each other, show an interest in what the others are doing and spend tons of quality time together. In all honesty, there's quite a bit to be jealous [of] when watching them.

— Jonathan Barkan, Bloody Disgusting, 2015

Addams Family Values was well received, garnering significantly better reviews than the first film. On review aggregation website Rotten Tomatoes, the film received an approval rating of 76% based on 115 reviews. The site's critical consensus reads: "New, well-developed characters add dimension to this batty satire, creating a comedy much more substantial than the original". On Metacritic, the film has a weighted average score of 61 out of 100 based on 21 critics, indicating "generally favorable" reviews. Audiences surveyed by CinemaScore gave the film an average grade of "B+" on an A+ to F scale, a grade up from the "B" earned by the previous film.

Janet Maslin of The New York Times wondered if "the making of this sequel was sheer drudgery for all concerned", then answered herself by writing: "There's simply too much glee on the screen, thanks to a cast and visual conception that were perfect in the first place and a screenplay by Paul Rudnick that specializes in delightfully arch, subversive humor". Leonard Klady of Variety was slightly less enthusiastic than Maslin: "It remains perilously slim in the story department, but glides over the thin ice with technical razzle-dazzle and an exceptionally winning cast". Richard Schickel, writing for Time, was even less enthusiastic than Klady, calling the film "an essentially lazy movie, too often settling for easy gags and special effects that don't come to any really funny point". Both Gene Siskel and Roger Ebert had disliked the first film. Siskel gave Addams Family Values a mixed review and accused Barry Sonnenfeld of caring more about how the film looks than how the jokes play. Ebert gave the film three stars out of four and thought that, unusually for a sequel, it improved upon its predecessor. He enjoyed the various subplots and recommended the film.

=== Accolades ===
The film was nominated for an Academy Award in the category Best Art Direction (Ken Adam, Marvin March), but lost to Schindler's List at the 66th Academy Awards; and Huston was nominated for the 1993 Golden Globe Award for Best Actress – Motion Picture Musical or Comedy for her performance as Morticia Addams at the 51st Golden Globes, a reprise of her Golden Globe-nominated performance in the 1991 original. The film also won a Golden Raspberry Award for Worst Original Song for the Tag Team track "Addams Family (Whoomp!)" at the 14th Golden Raspberry Awards. Addams Family Values was nominated for AFI's 100 Years...100 Laughs. In 2016, James Charisma of Playboy ranked the film #15 on a list of "15 Sequels That Are Way Better Than The Originals".

== Home media ==
The Addams Family Values video game was produced by Ocean Software. The film was released on VHS and DVD in 2000 with only two theatrical trailers as special features. It was re-released in 2006 with the first film on a single disc, with no new features. In October 2019, the film debuted on the Blu-ray format when Paramount Pictures released double feature of Addams Family and Addams Family Values on Blu-ray in the United States, along with standalone releases. In Australia, the film was released on VHS by Paramount Home Entertainment (Australasia) in 1994. In 2002, the film was released on DVD with theatrical trailers in the extra features.

== Legacy ==
In retrospect, Barry Sonnenfeld recalled: "I was disappointed in the box office for the second film. I think the first film is more romantic and the second film is funnier. Part of the reason it didn't do as well is that the marketing of the movie was so similar to the first one that people didn't think it was going to be any value-added and I really wanted to push the Pubert of it all and the Fester of it all. Instead, the whole campaign was back with the original Addams Family, so it wasn't really promising anything new. I think that's in part why it didn't do as well. Many people love it as much or more as the first one".

In the decades since its release, the film has been reassessed with retrospective acclaim, with the film's dark humor and satire being lauded. Christina Ricci's and Joan Cusack's performances have also received praise, with Cusack's role in particular becoming the source of several memes and tribute videos on YouTube dedicated to her performance.

On December 27th, 2013, YouTube Channel Achievement Hunter would upload Let’s Play Minecraft 83: Geoff’s House Part 2. During the episode, the group would get in a debate over the film brought up by Gavin Free. Specifically centered around the existence of Pubert, this video would cause more widespread memes of the character.

== Bibliography ==
- Halstead, Craig; Cadman, Chris (2003). Michael Jackson: The Solo Years. Hertford: Authors Online. ISBN 0755200918. OCLC 52975896.
