= Morticia Addams =

Fictional character from The Addams Family

- The Addams Family character
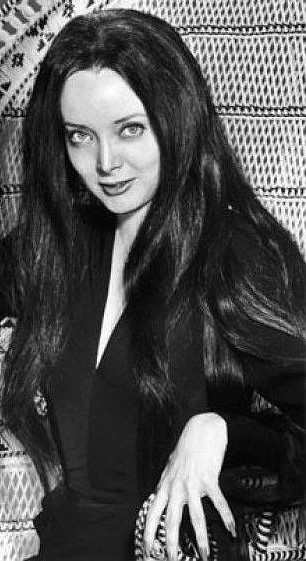
- Carolyn Jones as Morticia Addams in the 1960s television series
- First appearance: The New Yorker (1938)
- Created by: Charles Addams
- Portrayed by: Carolyn Jones (1964–1966, 1977); Liz Torres (1973); Anjelica Huston (1991–1993); Daryl Hannah (1998); Ellie Harvie (1998–1999); Bebe Neuwirth (2010); Brooke Shields (2011); Samantha Womack (2017); Catherine Zeta-Jones (2022–present)
- Voiced by: Carolyn Jones (1972); Janet Waldo (1973); Nancy Linari (1992); Charlize Theron (2019, 2021)

In-universe information
- Family: Fester (originally maternal uncle, brother-in-law in the modern versions); Grandmama (mother-in-law); Granny Addams (mother); Ophelia Frump (sister); Pancho (brother-in-law, Halloween with the New Addams Family); Cousin Itt (cousin-in-law); Debbie Addams (née Jellinsky) (sister-in-law, Addams Family Values); Grandpa Droop (maternal grandfather); Grandma Droop (maternal grandmother); Hester Addams (née Droop) (mother); Grandpa Addams (father); Uncle Tic (maternal uncle); Aunt Phobia (aunt by marriage); Cousin Blob and Creep (maternal cousins); Clump (maternal uncle); Aphasia du Berry (aunt by marriage); Cousin Catastrophia and Melancholia (maternal cousins); Aunt Trivia (maternal aunt); Father Addams (father-in-law); Delilah Addams and Mooma (grandmothers-in-law); Mortimer and Slurp (grandfathers-in-law); Diandra Addams (step-grandmother-in-law); Millicent con Schlepp (aunt-in-law); Unnamed (uncle-in-law); Cousin Balthazar (cousin-in-law)
- Spouse: Gomez (husband)
- Children: Wednesday (daughter); Pugsley (son); Pubert Addams (younger son, Addams Family Values); Wednesday Jr. (younger daughter, Halloween with the New Addams Family); Pugsley Jr. (younger son, Halloween with the New Addams Family)

Morticia Addams (née Frump) is a fictional character from the Addams Family multimedia franchise created by American Charles Addams in 1933. She plays the role of the family's reserved matriarch. Morticia Addams has been portrayed by several actresses in various Addams Family media, including Carolyn Jones in the television series The Addams Family (1964–1966), Anjelica Huston in the feature films The Addams Family (1991) and Addams Family Values (1993), and Catherine Zeta-Jones in the streaming television series Wednesday (2022).

== Cartoons ==
"The real head of the family and the critical and moving force behind it. Low-voiced, incisive and subtle; smiles are rare. This ruined beauty has a romantic side, too, and is given to low-keyed rhapsodies about her garden of deadly nightshade, henbane and dwarf's hair. Generally indulgent [of] the often sinister activities of the children, but feels that Uncle Fester has to be held in check. Her costume is always the same—the form-fitting black gown, tattered or cut to ribbons at the elbows and feet. Occasionally, she will wear a shawl. Her voice is never raised, but has great range. Contemptuous and original and with a fierce family loyalty. She never uses a cliché except to be funny. She is a thoughtful hostess in her way and, if a guest needs anything, he is advised to scream for it. The children are instructed to observe the amenities and always kick Daddy good night." — Charles Addams

Morticia first appeared in Charles Addams's newspaper cartoons as the stern, aloof matriarch of the family. She often appeared with the rest of the family, and was, along with Gomez and Grandmama, one of the few members to actually speak in the cartoons.

== Background ==
Morticia is the wife of Gomez Addams and mother of Wednesday, Pugsley and Pubert Addams. The character originated in the Charles Addams cartoons for The New Yorker magazine in the 1930s. In the cartoons, none of the family members had names. When the characters were adapted to the 1964 television series, Charles Addams's selection of her name was inspired by "mortician". Morticia's maiden name is "Frump" and she has an older sister named Ophelia (also played by Carolyn Jones in the original TV series). In the television series, her mother is Hester Frump (played by Margaret Hamilton). Her mother-in-law is Grandmama Addams. In the 1990s Addams Family films, familial relationships are changed for the characters of Grandmama and Fester. Grandmama is actually Morticia's mother, not Gomez's, while Fester is Gomez's brother, not Morticia's uncle.

Morticia is slim, with extremely pale skin and long flowing straight black hair. She commonly wears black hobble skirts to match her hair, tightly form fitting, with a fringe of octopus-like cloth "tentacles" at the lower hem. According to Wednesday, Morticia applies baking powder to her face instead of actual makeup. In each episode, she easily allures her husband Gomez by speaking French (or any other foreign language for that matter). Morticia is musically inclined, and is often seen freely strumming a Japanese shamisen. She frequently enjoys cutting the buds off of roses, which she discards (keeping only the stems), likes cutting out paper dolls with three legs and making sweaters with three arms, collecting the mail from the hand-in-the-box Thing, and cooking unusual concoctions for her husband, including eye of newt. Her personal pet is Cleopatra, a fictitious breed of carnivorous plant called an African Strangler, to which she feeds hamburgers and various other meats.

She is described as a witch. In one episode, she wears a black pointed hat. Her family tree can be traced back to Salem, Massachusetts, and witchcraft is also implied at times in the television series. For example, Morticia likes to "smoke," an activity that does not involve cigarettes or cigars (such as her husband frequently enjoys), but smoke instead emanates directly from her.

In 2009, she was included in Yahoo!'s Top 10 TV Moms from Six Decades of Television for the time period 1964–1966. AOL named her one of the 100 Most Memorable Female TV Characters.

== In other media ==
Morticia was also one of the inspirations for the Disney character Magica De Spell, first designed and drawn by Carl Barks for the Donald Duck universe. Natasha Fatale, a villain from the Rocky and Bullwinkle cartoons, was also based on Morticia's design.

== Relationships ==
=== Family tree ===
Addams family tree

Grandmama (Note: In the Broadway musical The Addams Family, Morticia refers to Grandmama as Gomez and Uncle Fester's mother, to which Gomez reacts with surprise and says that he had thought she was Morticia's mother. Morticia later says that Grandmama "may not even be part of this family", referencing Grandmama's ever-changing relation to the family.)
Debbie Jellinsky (Note: Established in the 1993 film Addams Family Values.)	Uncle Fester	Cousin Itt	Margaret Alford	Tully Alford
Mal Beineke (Note: Established in the Broadway musical The Addams Family.)	Alice Beineke	Gomez Addams	Morticia Addams (née Frump)	Rupert Styx (Note: Established in the 1964 episode "Halloween with the Addams Family".)
Lucas Beineke	Wednesday Addams	Pugsley Addams	Pubert Addams
Wednesday Addams Jr. (Note: Established in the 1977 film Halloween with the New Addams Family.)	Pugsley Addams Jr.

== See also ==
- Vampira
- Elvira
- Lily Munster
