= A Bell for Adano (novel) =

1944 novel by John Hersey

- A Bell for Adano first-edition cover
- Author: John Hersey
- Cover artist: George Salter
- Language: English
- Genre: War novel
- Published: 1944 (Alfred A. Knopf)
- Publication place: United States
- Media type: Print (hardcover)
- Pages: 269 pp (first edition)
- OCLC: 284933
- Dewey Decimal: 813/.54 19
- LC Class: PS3515.E7715 B5 1988

A Bell for Adano is a 1944 novel by John Hersey, the winner of the 1945 Pulitzer Prize for Fiction. It tells the story of an Italian-American officer in Sicily during World War II who wins the respect and admiration of the people of the town of Adano by helping them find a replacement for the town bell that the Fascists had melted down for rifle barrels.

== Plot summary ==
The novel is set during the 1943 Allied occupation of the fictional Italian coastal town of Adano (based on the real city of Licata). The main character, Major Victor Joppolo, is the temporary administrator of the town during the occupation and is often referred to by the people of Adano as Mister Major. Joppolo is an idealistic Italian-American who wants to bring justice and compassion to Adano, which has been hardened by the authoritarian Fascist regime of Benito Mussolini.

When Major Joppolo arrives at Adano, he immediately asks the people of the town what they need the most. The first spokesman of the town tells Joppolo that they are in great need of food for some people have not eaten in days. The second spokesman of the town argues that the town's immediate necessity is a new bell. Joppolo is touched by the story of a 700-year-old bell that was taken away from the town by the Fascists. Mussolini had ordered that the bell be removed from the town and be melted to make weapons for the war. The people were greatly attached to the bell. To them, the bell was a source of pride and unity. Joppolo immediately sees the importance of the bell and makes persistent attempts to locate the bell.

In addition to finding the bell, Joppolo spends time trying to supply the town with food and other necessities. He soon discovers that the town has no fish because the fishermen have not gone out in months. When he speaks to Tomasino, the leader of the fishermen, Joppolo finds out that this is because the fisherman were forced to pay 'protection' money to the corrupt Fascist government simply to go out fishing. Joppolo tells Tomasino that he will not have to pay any bribes or extra taxes to the Americans for fishing. At first, Tomasino is convinced that Joppolo is lying to him and that it is some sort of cruel trick. Tomasino hates persons of authority because he believes that they are all power-hungry and corrupt. It takes extensive persuading to convince Tomasino that Joppolo's intentions are good and that his only want is for the people of Adano to have fish.

Joppolo is faced with another problem in which he had to countermand the order of General Marvin in order to do what was best for the town. General Marvin is an army general who happens to pass through Adano. All day his armored car has been slowed by mule carts that are blocking the road. Finally, on the road to Adano, he loses his temper and orders that his men shoot a mule that refuses to move from the center of the road. When General Marvin arrived at Adano, he orders Major Joppolo to keep all mule carts out of the town. Joppolo is disheartened but complies with the order. Immediately, he calls for a meeting with all the officials of the town and tells them of the new order, but also that he is prepared to find a solution. The next day, Joppolo decides that countermanding General Marvin's order is more important than his own position as mayor of the town; therefore he tells the people of Adano that they may bring their carts into the town (among other things, the town has no source of water without the carts).

Later in the novel, Joppolo gains the admiration of U.S. Navy Lieutenant Livingston, who invites Joppolo to come have a drink with some of his Navy buddies. While there, Joppolo tells them of the town's need for a bell. Commander Robertson realizes that they might have exactly the bell that Adano needs, aboard the USS Corelli. The arrival of the bell to the town coincides with a party that the town is hosting for Joppolo to express their gratitude for all of his great doings. Although the bell has arrived at the town, the engineers say that it will take them until the next morning to install it. At the same time Sergeant Borth, one of Major Joppolo's aides, finds a note from General Marvin that says that Joppolo has been relieved of duty as administrator of Adano because he countermanded General Marvin's order. Sergeant Borth tells Joppolo that he has been relieved from duty while they are at the party and hands Joppolo the order. The next morning, Joppolo leaves Adano, but does not say goodbye to anyone because he does not think he could. As the jeep is driving away, he tells the driver to stop for a moment. They hear the clear sound of a loud bell.

== Characters ==
Major Victor Joppolo: The protagonist of the story, is the interim mayor of the Italian coastal town of Adano. He is sincerely interested in restoring happiness and prosperity and goes to great lengths to satisfy the people's needs.

Sergeant Borth: A sergeant in the Military Police platoon assigned to garrison Adano; admires the major's changes to the town.

Captain Purvis: Under Major Joppolo and the officer in charge of the military police in Adano.

General Marvin: General of the American 34th Infantry Division in Italy. He orders that all carts stay out of Adano and relieves Major Joppolo of his position when he discovers that the major countermanded his order.

Tina: The daughter of Tomasino, Major Joppolo develops an affinity for her over the course of the novel, even though it may be because she wants the major to find out whether her sweetheart is still alive.

Giuseppe: Major Joppolo's interpreter.

Zito: Major Joppolo's usher.

Tomasino: The leader of the fishermen. Tomasino, though skeptical at first, is thrilled when Major Joppolo allows him and his men to go out and fish.

Cacopardo: A rich man, he owns the sulfur refinery of Adano. His chiasmus seen throughout the book: "Cacopardo is sulphur and sulphur is Cacopardo."

Mercurio Salvatore: The crier of the town.

Gargano: Chief of the police in Adano.

Mayor Nasta: Former fascist mayor of Adano, he comes back to the town and is ridiculed by all.

Lieutenant Livingston: A United States Navy lieutenant, he is in charge of the port of Adano.

== Reception ==
A Bell for Adano was published in 1944 and won the Pulitzer Prize in 1945. Time magazine in 1944 wrote, "The mood of A Bell for Adano is bitter. Its humor is raucous and wild. At its worst, it descends to college humorous magazine slapstick. At its best it is a superb piece of reporting. Read unimaginatively, it is a deadly account of U.S. official incompetence. Stripped of its humor, it is the story of a battle for democracy, no less real for being fought without arms, more important than the military engagement that preceded it." Kenneth Dave Schadt of the Vancouver Public Library later noted, "The novel achieved huge popularity and was hailed as a classic war novel. The book is rich in characterization, and it is recognized as a classic study in leadership. Another possible reason it was so well received was that the novel portrays the American army in a positive light and shows how democracy is inherently superior to Fascism."

== Connections to World War II ==
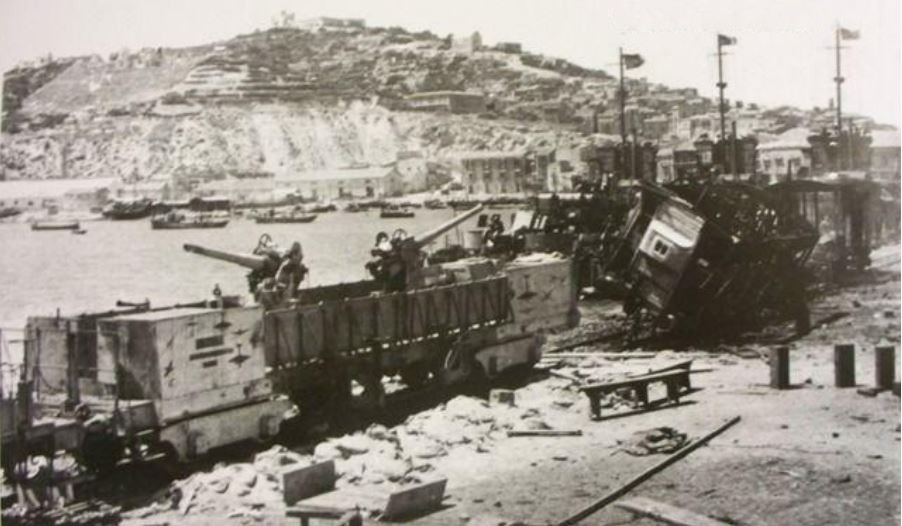
Treno armato Licata

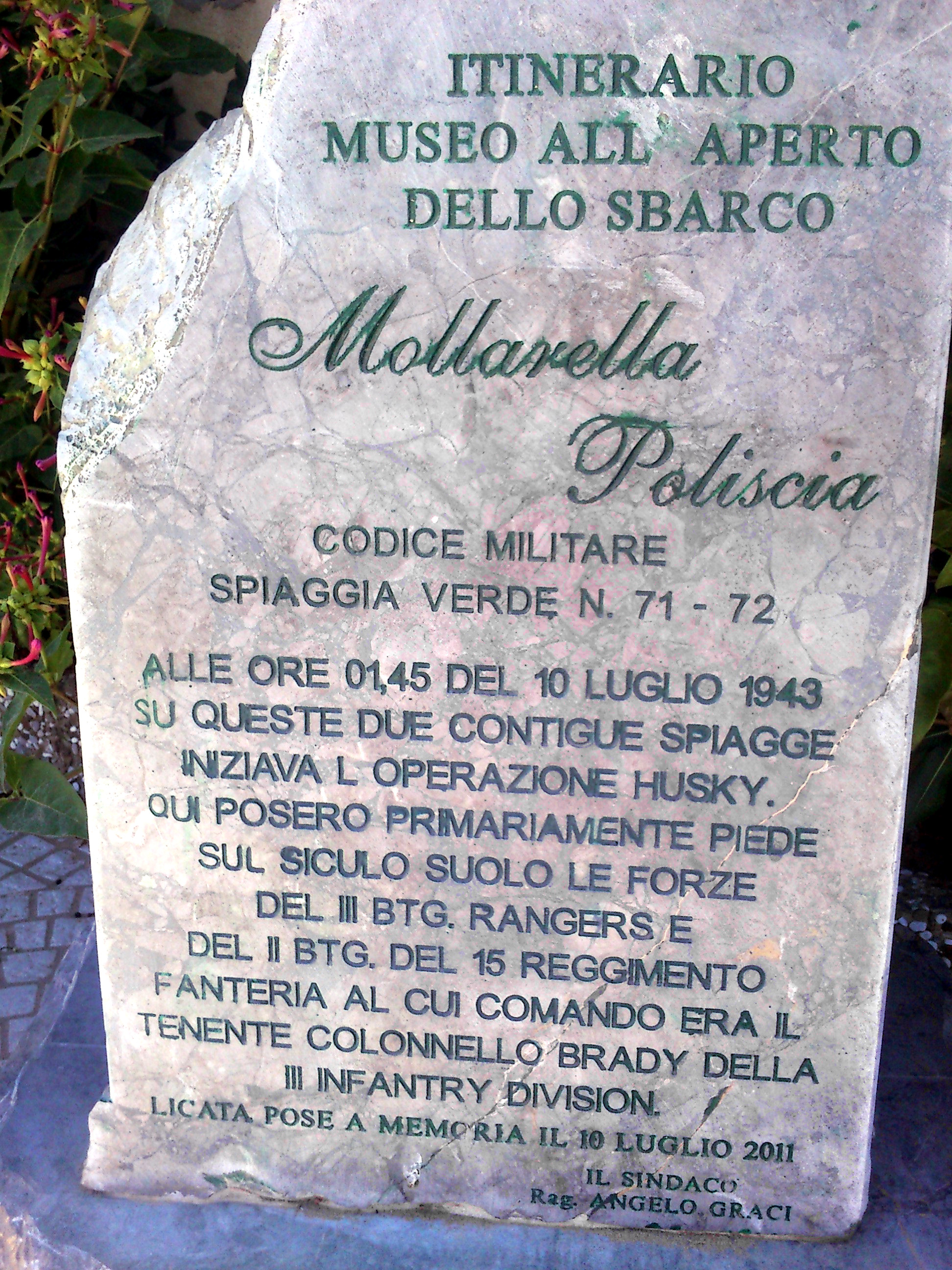

Adano is a fictional Sicilian port town modeled after the real town of Licata, Sicily, one of the disembarkation towns on the beaches of Mollarella and Poliscia during the Allied occupation of Italy. Just like Adano in the novel, Licata has a shipping and sulfur industry and a fishing port, and its largest church is the Church of Sant'Angelo. Additionally, Benito Mussolini did have Licata's 700-year-old bell melted to make ammunition. Major Joppolo is based on the American military governor of Licata named Frank E. Toscani. John Hersey visited Toscani for four or five days during the war and created Victor Joppolo from him, noting that he held a job as a civilian clerk in the New York City Sanitation Department. General Marvin is a depiction of the World War II General Patton, who was known for his bitterness and cruelty, but also his effectiveness.

== Adaptations ==
The novel was the basis of Paul Osborn's 1944 Broadway play A Bell for Adano, starring Fredric March.

A film version of the novel, A Bell for Adano (1945), starred John Hodiak.

A Bell for Adano was presented on Star Playhouse on October 11, 1953. March starred in the adaptation.

On June 2, 1956, CBS Television broadcast a version of Hersey's story, starring Barry Sullivan and Anna Maria Alberghetti and directed by Paul Nickell.

On November 15, 1967, Hallmark Hall of Fame broadcast a version starring John Forsythe and Murray Hamilton and directed by Mel Ferrer.

== Sources ==
- Huey, Peggy J. "A Bell for Adano." In Werlock, Abby H. P., ed. Facts On File Companion to the American Novel. New York: Facts On File, Inc., 2006. Bloom's Literary Reference Online. Facts On File, Inc. (accessed June 9, 2008).
