= Castel Sant'Angelo (disambiguation) =

Castel Sant'Angelo is a mausoleum and castle in Rome, Italy. It may also refer to:

- Castel Sant'Angelo, Lazio
- Castel Sant'Angelo (Licata)
- Angelokastro (Corfu)

== See also ==
- Fort St. Angelo in Birgu, Malta
- St. Angelo Fort in Kannur, India
