= San Giacomo Lighthouse =

San Giacomo lighthouse
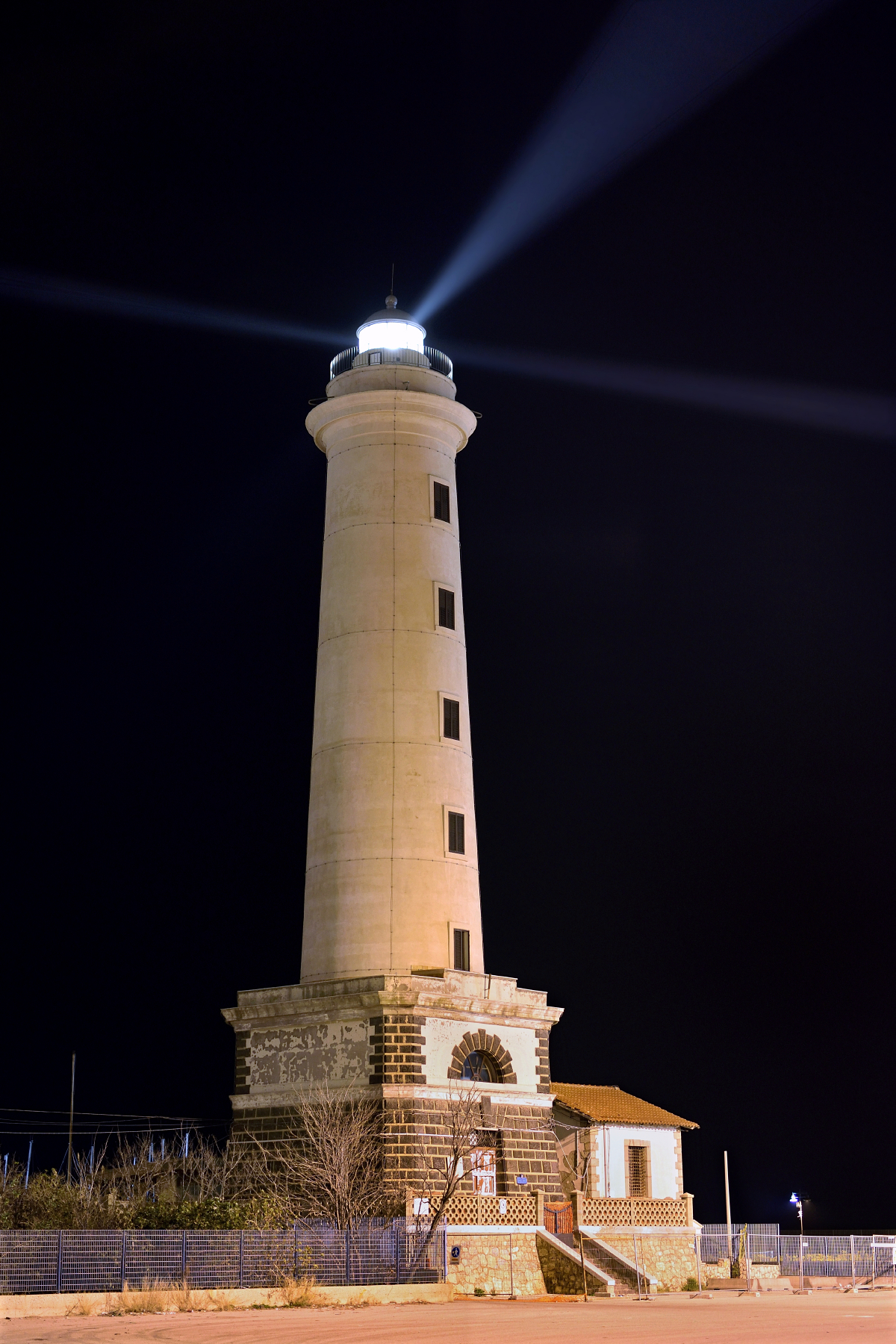
- Location: Licata; Sicily; Italy
- Coordinates: 37°05′47″N 13°56′27″E

Tower
- Constructed: 1953
- Foundation: masonry base
- Construction: concrete tower
- Height: 37 metres (121 ft)
- Shape: cylindrical tower with balcony and lantern atop a quadrangular bas
- Markings: unpainted white concrete tower, dark grey and white trim base, grey metallic lantern dome
- Power source: mains electricity
- Operator: Marina Militare
- Heritage: Italian national heritage

Light
- First lit: 1895
- Focal height: 40 metres (130 ft)
- Lens: Type OR S4
- Intensity: AL 1000 W
- Range: main: 25 nautical miles (46 km; 29 mi) reserve: 18 nautical miles (33 km; 21 mi)
- Characteristic: Fl W 5s.
- Italy no.: 2954 E.F.

The San Giacomo Lighthouse (Italian: Faro di San Giacomo) is an active lighthouse at the root of the east wharf of the commercial harbour of Licata on the Channel of Sicily. The lighthouse takes its name from the homonymous castle once on the site, then later destroyed to make room for the seaport.

== Description ==
The lighthouse, built in 1895 on project by Antonino Davanteri, consists of a cylindrical tower, 37 metres (121 ft) high with balcony and lantern, atop a double quadrangular base covered by ashlar basalt with white trim. The lantern can be reached by a spiral staircase of 129 steps lighted by five aligned windows. The tower and the lantern are white, the lantern dome is grey metallic. The light is positioned at 40 metres (130 ft) above sea level and emits one white flash in a five-second period visible up to a distance of 25 nautical miles (46 km; 29 mi). The lighthouse is completely automated and managed by the Marina Militare with the identification code number 2954 E.F.

== See also ==
- List of lighthouses in Italy
