= A Bell for Adano =

1945 American war film directed by Henry King

- Theatrical poster
- Directed by: Henry King
- Screenplay by: Lamar Trotti; Norman Reilly Raine
- Based on: A Bell for Adano; 1944 novel by John Hersey
- Produced by: Louis D. Lighton; Lamar Trotti
- Starring: Gene Tierney; John Hodiak; William Bendix
- Cinematography: Joseph LaShelle
- Edited by: Barbara McLean
- Music by: Alfred Newman
- Production company: 20th Century Fox
- Distributed by: 20th Century Fox
- Release date: June 21, 1945 (U.S.)
- Running time: 103 minutes
- Country: United States
- Language: English
- Box office: $2.5 million

A Bell for Adano is a 1945 American war film directed by Henry King and starring John Hodiak and Gene Tierney. It was adapted from the 1944 novel of the same title by John Hersey, which won the Pulitzer Prize for fiction in 1945.

The story had been staged as a Broadway play in 1944 starring Fredric March.

== Plot ==
The story concerns Italian-American U.S. Army major Joppolo, who is placed in charge of the town of Adano during the invasion of Sicily. The priest explains that the heart of the town's activities centered upon the ringing of a 700-year-old bell that was taken at the start of the war to be melted for weapons. Joppolo begins a long struggle to replace the bell. Through his actions, Joppolo also wins the trust and love of the people.

Short-tempered American commander General Marvin removes Joppolo from his position when Joppolo disobeys an order to prohibit mule-cart traffic in Adano. Although the carts have been disrupting Allied supply trucks, they are vital to the survival of the town.

== Cast ==
- Gene Tierney as Tina Tomasino
- John Hodiak as Maj. Victor P. Joppolo
- William Bendix as Sgt. Borth
- Glenn Langan as Lt. Crofts Livingstone
- Richard Conte as Nico
- Stanley Prager as Sgt. Trampani
- Henry Morgan as Capt. N. Purvis
- Monty Banks as Giuseppe
- Reed Hadley as Cmdr. Robertson
- Roy Roberts as Col. W. W. Middleton
- Hugo Haas as Father Pensovecchio
- Marcel Dalio as Zito
- Fortunio Bonanova as Chief of Police Gargano
- Henry Armetta as Errante
- Roman Bohnen as Carl Erba
- Luis Alberni as Cacopardo
- Eduardo Ciannelli as Maj. Nasta

== Production ==
The character of Joppolo is based on the real-life experiences of Frank Toscani, who was the military governor of the town of Licata, Sicily after the Allied invasion.

== Reception ==
In a contemporary review for The New York Times, critic Bosley Crowther praised the script's fidelity to the original novel and wrote:

It is first a delightful chronicle of native character, of the naive and picturesque natures of most plain Italian folks. It is also a shrewd elucidation of contrasting men of ill will. But, more than that, it is a fine, inspiring picture of an "understanding man's" brave attempt to instrument true democracy in a community that barely knew the word. ... In short, "A Bell for Adano" is a human, heart-warming film—the sort of picture that should do more for "understanding" than ten million moralizing words."

== Adaptations ==
In addition to the Broadway play, there have been several other versions of John Hersey's book. In a 1955 Lux Video Theatre adaptation, Edmond O'Brien played the lead, with a young Charles Bronson in the part that William Bendix played in the film. Barry Sullivan and Anna Maria Alberghetti appeared in a 1956 CBS telecast, and John Forsythe played the major in a 1967 Hallmark Hall of Fame broadcast.
