= Antonietta (novel) =

1991 novel by John Hersey

- First edition cover
- Author: John Hersey
- Publication date: 1991
- ISBN: 0-679-40194-6

Antonietta is a novel written by American Pulitzer-Prize winning author John Hersey. Published in 1991, the novel traces the history of the titular violin, a fictitious creation of Antonio Stradivari, recounting its usage under multiple owners interspersed with what Hersey describes as "intermezzi", interludes of fact. Hersey's 25th novel, it was the last he released before his death.

== Overview ==
As a novel following the history of an object, it is in the style of a popular 18th-century genre termed "novel of circulation". The novel covers the history of the violin Antonietta from its creation by Antonio Stradivari in 1699. Beginning with an overview of the creation of the violin, named in honor of Stradivari's second wife, the novel follows the violin through multiple owners, focusing on its influence of their work and those around them. Among the owners of the violin featured in the novel are Mozart, who possessed the violin in the late 18th century and composed a sonata for it; Pierre Baillot, who describes its impact on the composition of Berlioz; Pavel Federovsky, who played in trio with Stravinsky; Spenser, a modern businessman in Martha's Vineyard; and Hersey himself, who claimed to have purchased the violin with advance money for the novel itself. In each section, the writer adopts a writing style to mirror the personality and perspective of the owner.

== Critical reception ==
The novel was critically well received. Publishers Weekly termed it a "delightful tour de force". While suggesting that it may not appeal to those who did not appreciate classical music, The Milwaukee Journal described the book as "original and vibrant", concluding that "the joint appeal of passion in music and irony in history is universal, and, I should think, irresistible." Publishers Weekly opined that while even non-music fans might enjoy the novel, which "satisfies on several levels", "the music lover will be doubly enchanted by a virtuoso performance." The Victoria Advocate summarized it as "a rare novel indeed, and for music lovers a gem of sparkling brilliance."

== Similar stories ==
It has been speculated that the novel was an influence on the 1998 Canadian film The Red Violin, which similarly traces the history of an evocative violin through multiple owners. The film's producers indicate that although they became aware of the similarities in story concept during the writing of the film, the writers were instructed not to read the book to avoid any unconscious influence.
