= The Child Buyer =

1960 novel by John Hersey

First edition (publ. Knopf)

The Child Buyer is John Hersey's 1960 novel about a project to engineer super-intelligent persons for a project whose aim is never definitely stated. Told entirely in the form of minutes from a State Senate Standing Committee, it relates the story of the appearance and efforts of a mysterious stranger in the small town of Pequot, and the repercussions of his attempt to buy a boy, Barry Rudd.

The novel is primarily a satire on the school system, although it also posits questions about intelligence, the validity of intelligence/personality tests, and the efficacy of attempts to quantify humanity. One of its major themes is corruption—in the stranger's (Wissey Jones's) relentless quest to buy Barry, Jones manages to persuade everyone concerned with the transaction, including Barry himself, to go along with him, primarily through favours (money, honorary degrees, positions, status, et al.), although Barry and his would-be defender, a Dr. Gozar, are convinced through a sort of desperate logic.

The novel, in its description of a non-existent mental-conditioning process possibly intended as a means of leaving Earth, approaches science fiction, although it is more properly put in the genre of speculative fiction.

The novel was shortlisted for the 1961 National Book Award for Fiction.

== Characters ==
- Barry Rudd - a main character of The Child Buyer. He is thought to have an IQ of 189, and is described by his teachers as maladjusted and socially deviant genius. Physically, he is described as fat, waistless, and sexually underdeveloped. His extreme intelligence becomes known throughout his small town of Pequot and eventually comes to the attention of Wissey Jones, a man determined to buy Barry for the company United Lymphomilloid (known colloquially as U. Lympho.) and their secret government project.
- Wissey Jones - the influential and brilliant antagonist of The Child Buyer. Mr. Jones buys children for his company United Lymphomilloid, a sinister conglomerate that is operating a national security project for the United States government. Jones' special talent is being able to identify the levers in each person to make them go along with his purchases. He fulfills desires (gifts, influence, stature, and petty needs) to enlist the help of others. He is the perfect salesman.
- Charles Aram Perkonian Jr. (AKA "Flat-top") Flat-Top, a precocious juvenile delinquent, is Barry Rudd's best (and probably only) contemporary.
