= Sicilian cart =

Ornate horse-drawn cart

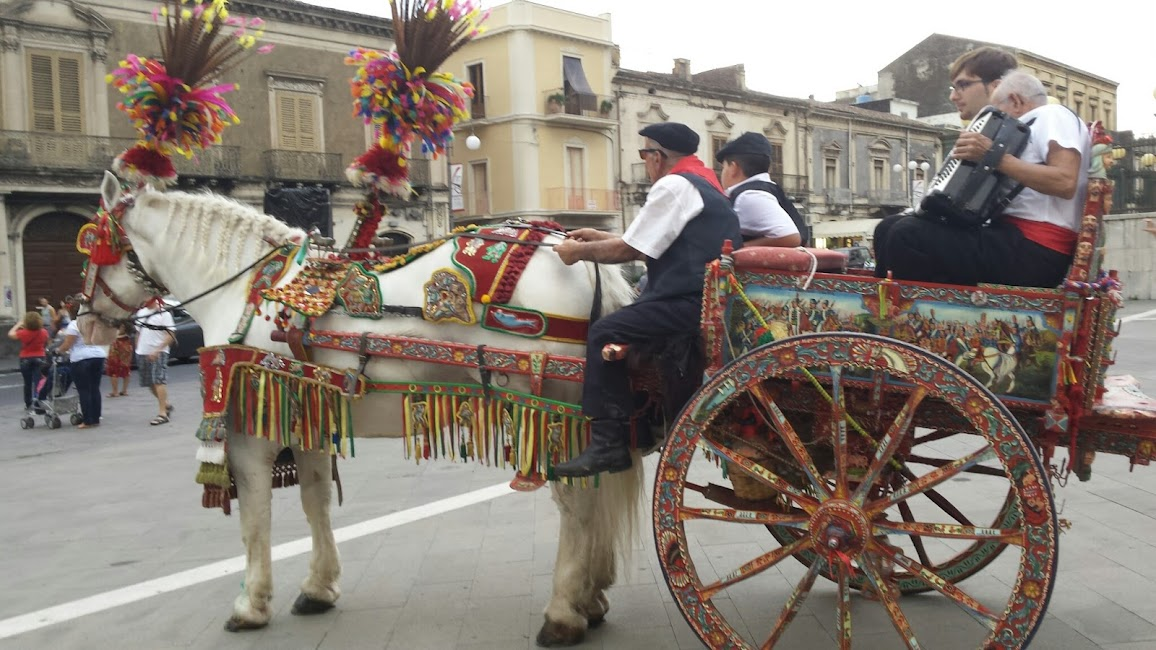
A carretto, 2003

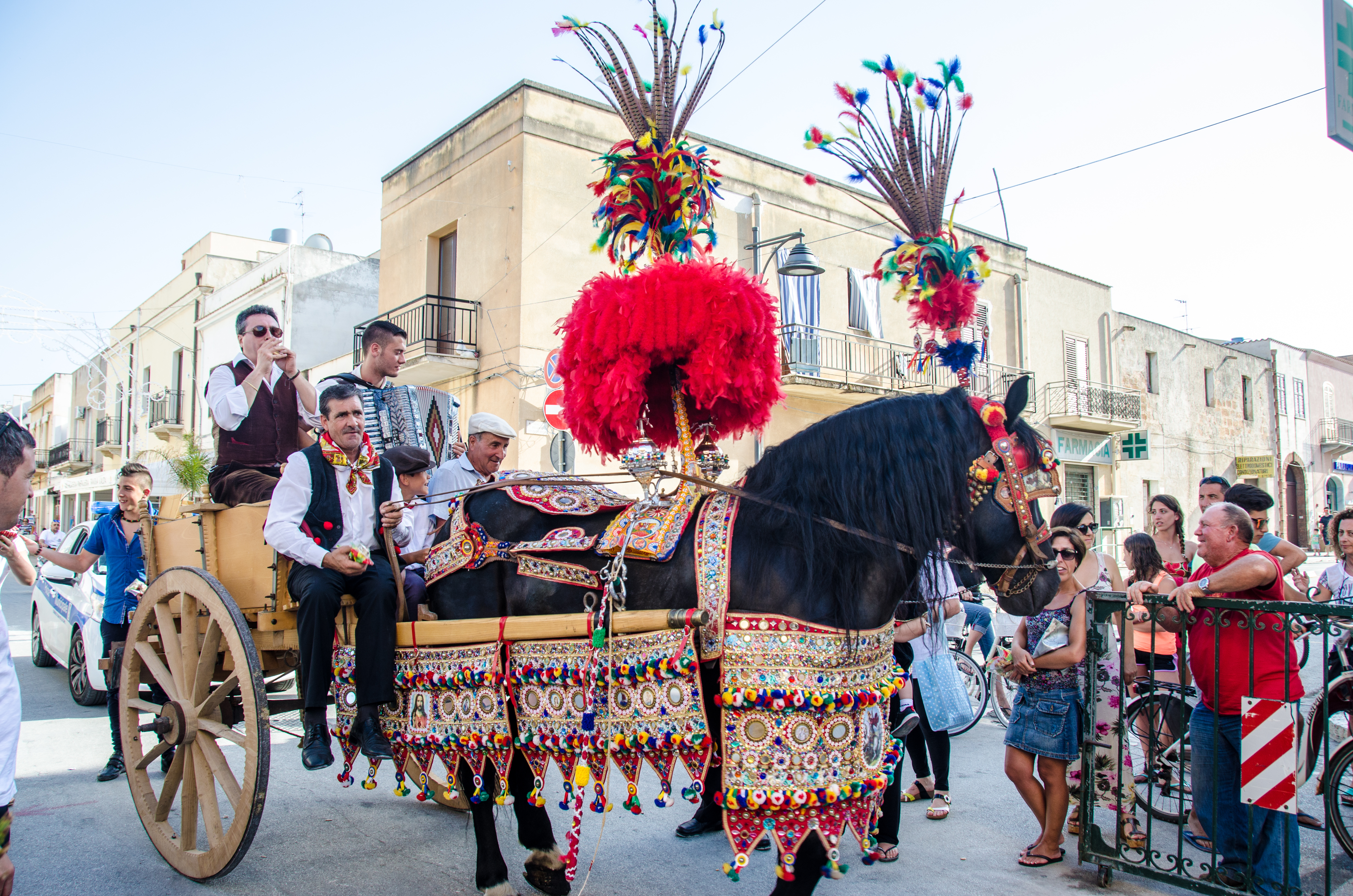
An ornately decorated horse and harness pulls this new not-yet-painted carretto. The driver sits on a small board at the front of the cart.

The Sicilian cart or carretto (pl. carretti; Italian: carretto siciliano; Sicilian: carrettu sicilianu or carrettu) is an ornate, colorful style of horse-drawn cart native to the island of Sicily, Italy, which has become a cultural emblem for the region.

The owner, operator or driver of a carretto is called a carrettiere; the carriagemaker is called carratore.

== Design ==
The two-wheeled cart is made of wood with iron components. The shafts are straight and there is a narrow board at the front where the driver and others can sit, sometimes with their legs straddling one of the shafts. The horse and harness are also highly decorated and wear tall plumes. The carts are covered in carvings and brightly painted scenes from Sicilian history and folklore as well as intricate geometrical designs. The colors of Sicily's flag, yellow and red, feature prominently, along with details in bright blues and greens. According to one author:

Many wood parts are carved elaborately, some items are applied to the surface of the wood (like carved figures, shells, stone, mirrors or saint figurines), the wheels are painted in wild geometric or floral patterns, animals and tassels are often attached to the hubs.

The making of a carretto includes woodcarvers, metal workers, and painters, and the craft of making the carts is handed down from generation to generation, through the training of apprentices. There are four variations of the Sicilian carretto, each from a different province and each with their own style. Carretti made in the province of Palermo have more of a square box design, those made in Catania have more elaborate ornamentation, and those in Agrigento have their own distinctive style.

Details

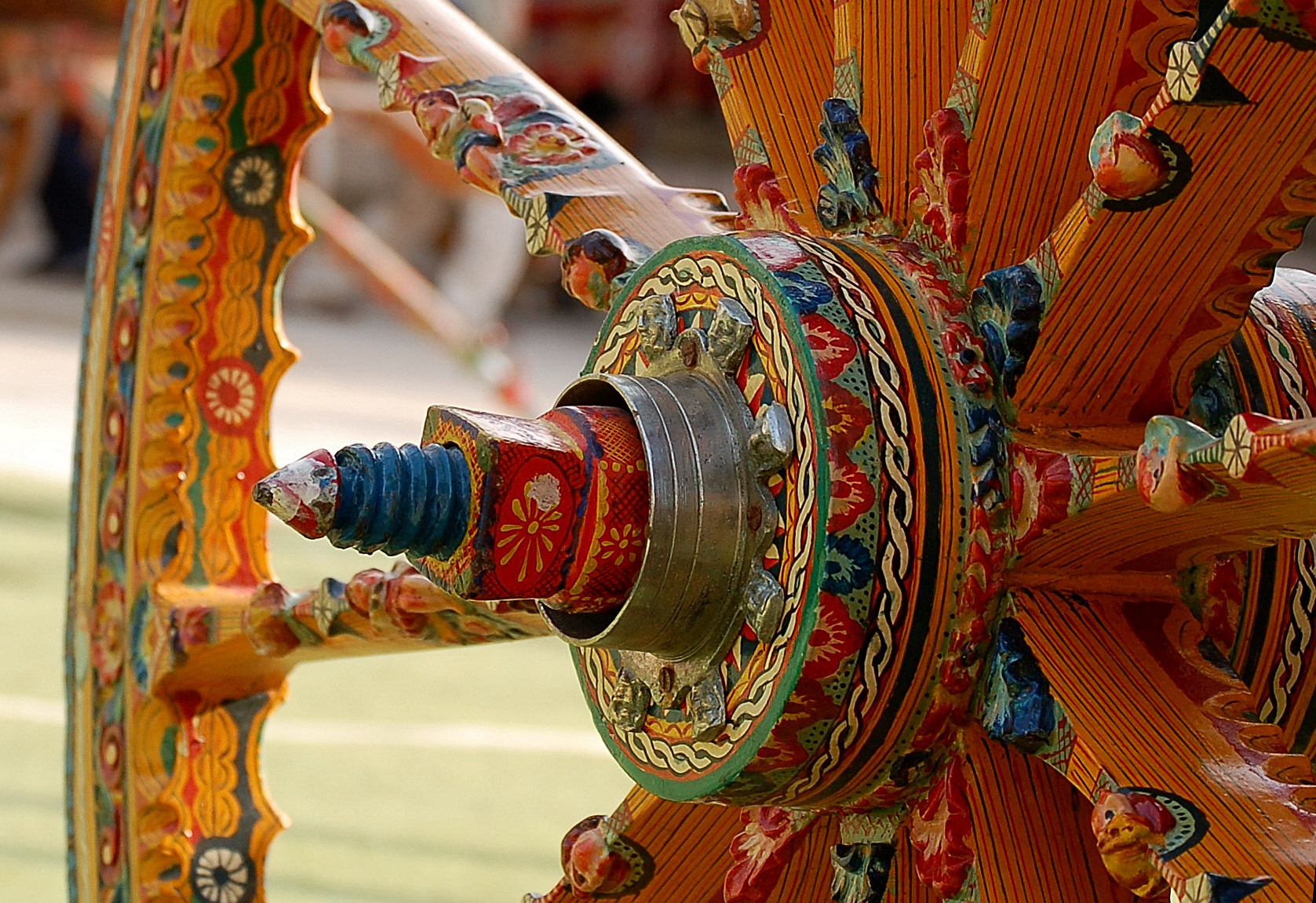
Highly carved and painted wheel

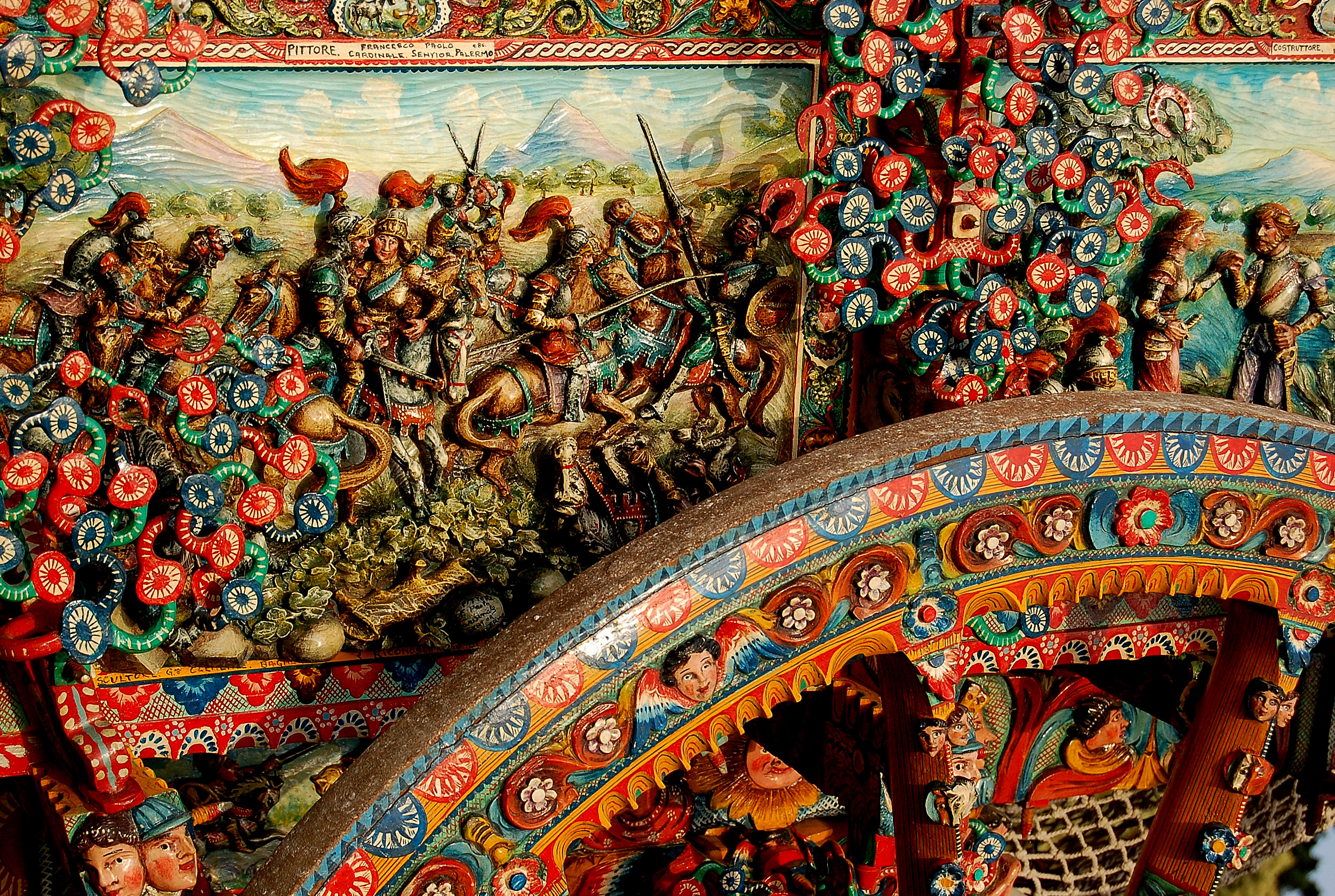
Closeup of carvings

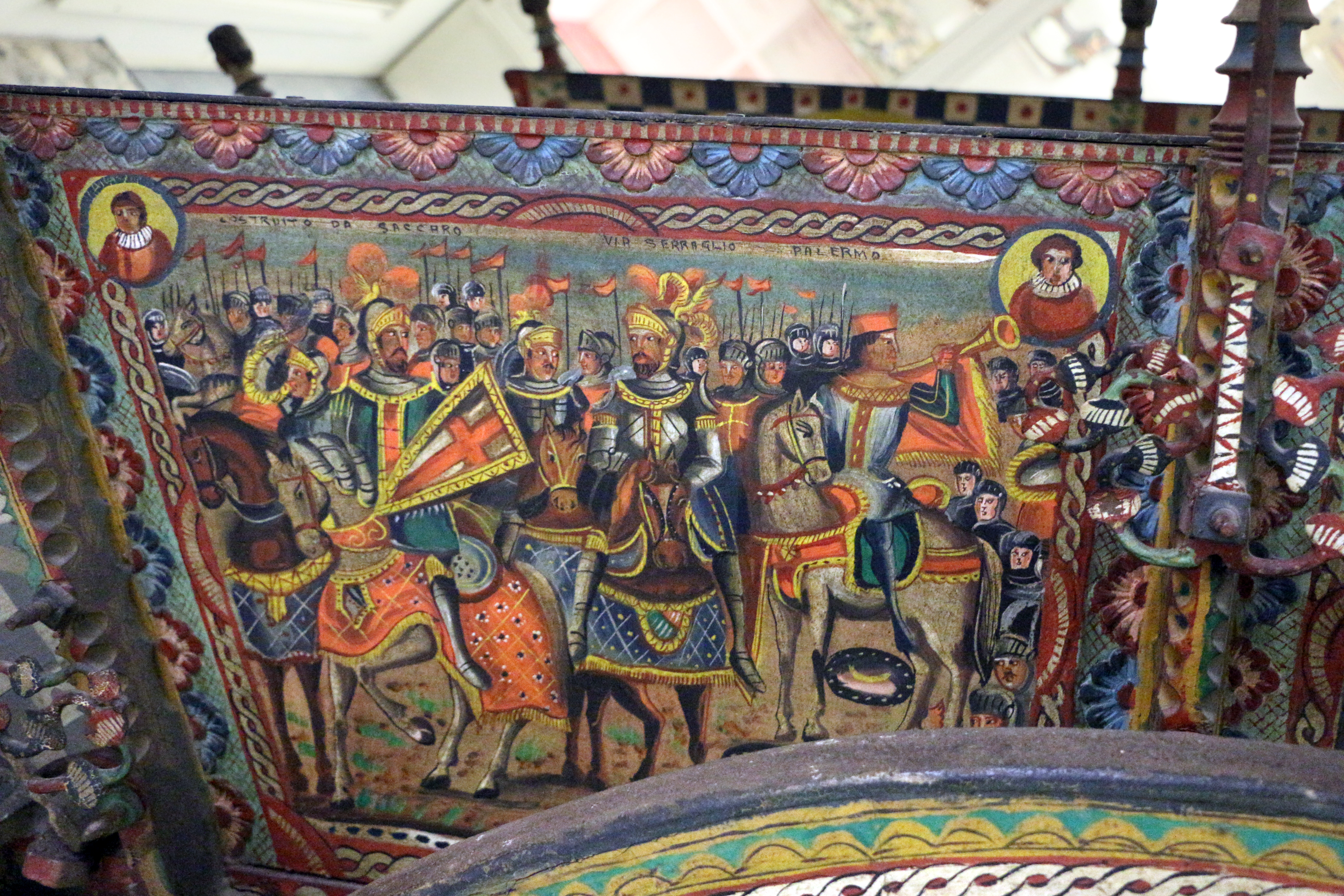
Painted panel on a pre-1907 carretto

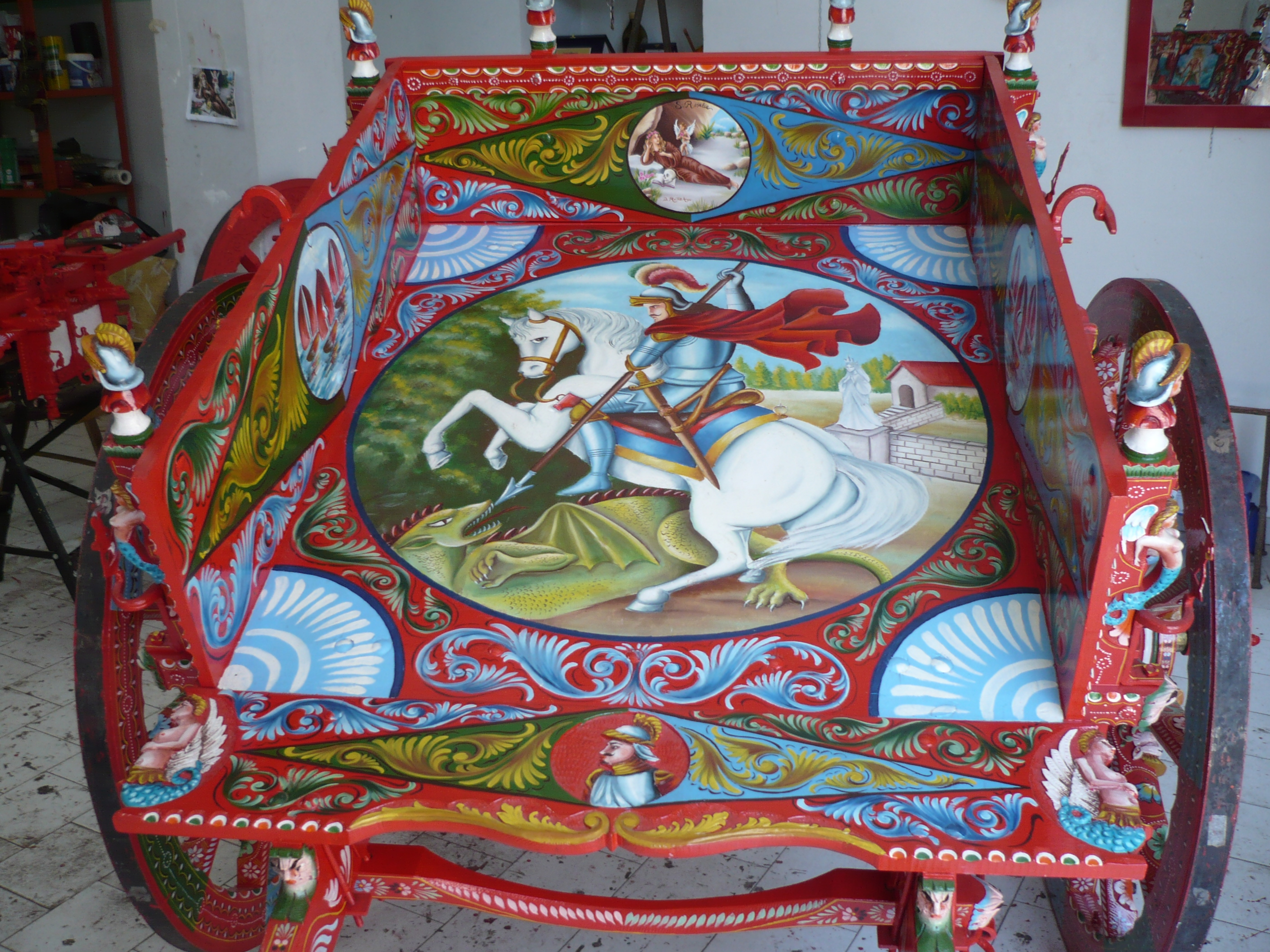
Every surface is highly decorated

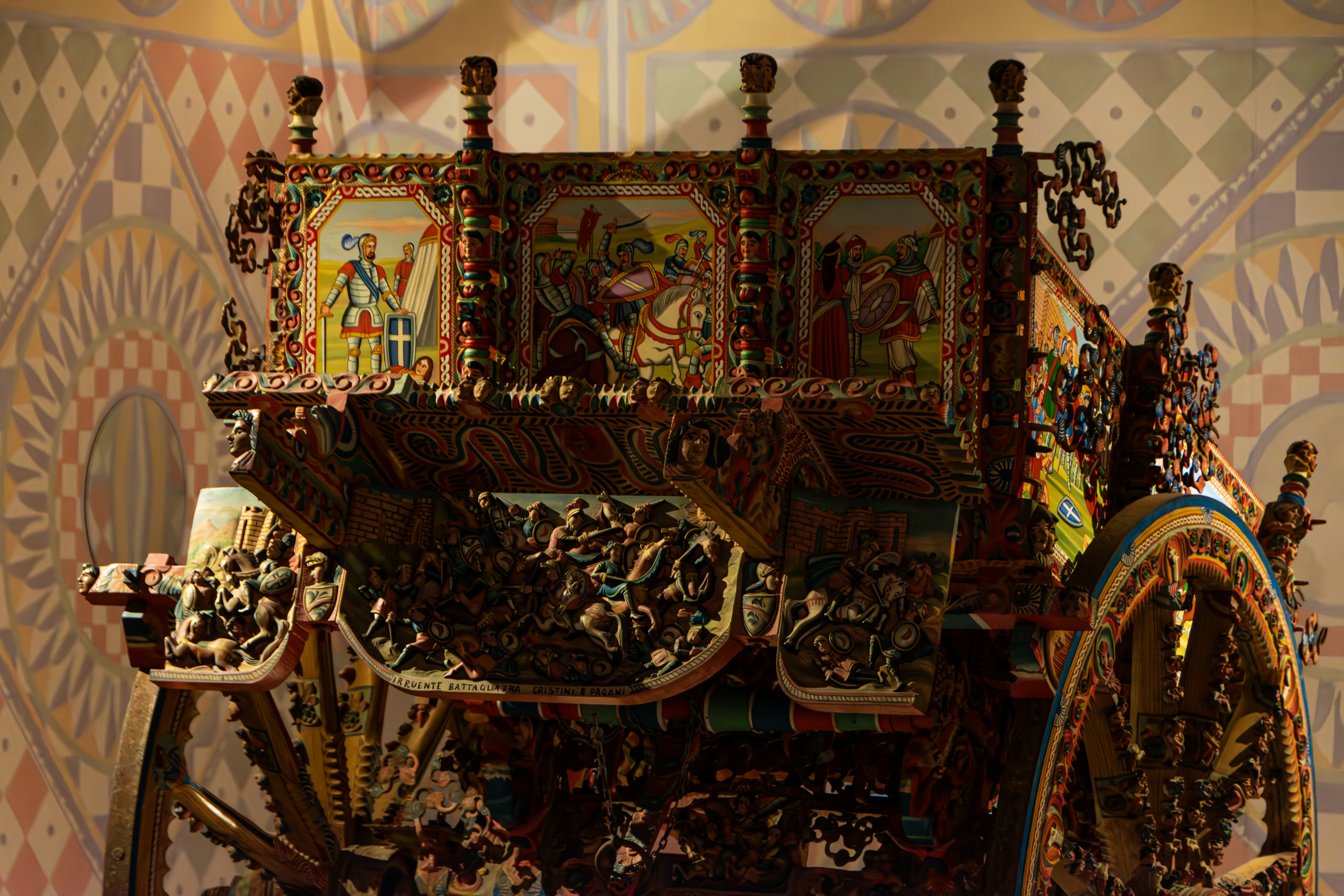
Extreme and intricate ornamentation

== Historical context ==
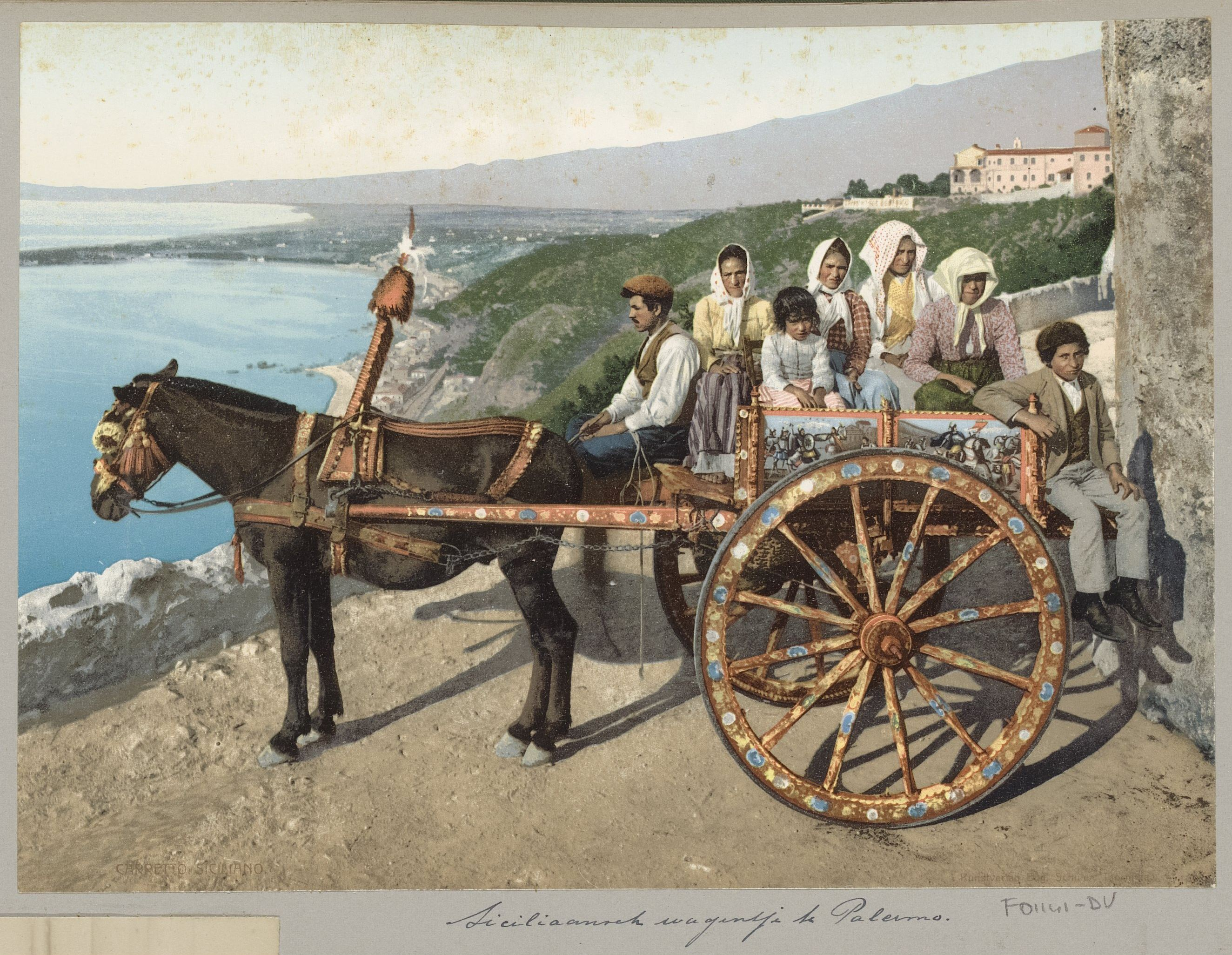
A carretto, circa 1900

Carretti were used for the transportation of goods throughout the island of Sicily from the 19th to the 20th century, and reached the height of their popularity in the 1920s when many thousand were on the island. The carretto was like the taxi or truck of today. Carretti da lavoro (carts for work) were used for hauling loads of produce, wood, wine, and people, and carretti da gara were carts used for festive occasions such as weddings and parades. Petralia states that horses were used to pull carretti in the cities and flat plains, while donkeys or mules were more often used in rough terrain or for hauling heavy loads.

== Modern usage ==
The carretto has become a cultural symbol for Sicily, and as of 2021 Sicily's Regional Department for Cultural Heritage started the process to have the Sicilian carretto recognized as part of the UNESCO World Heritage list. There are several museums dedicated to the carts in Sicily including the Museo regionale di Terrasini in Terrasini and the Museo del Carretto Siciliano in Aci Sant'Antonio.

Carretti are popular with tourists and there are even four-wheeled variations for sightseers.

Miniature carts (carrettini) are sold as souvenirs in Sicily, or in Italian shops and restaurants in other countries.

In modern-day Sicily, the tradition of ornately painted taxis continues in small motorized vehicles.

Modern variations

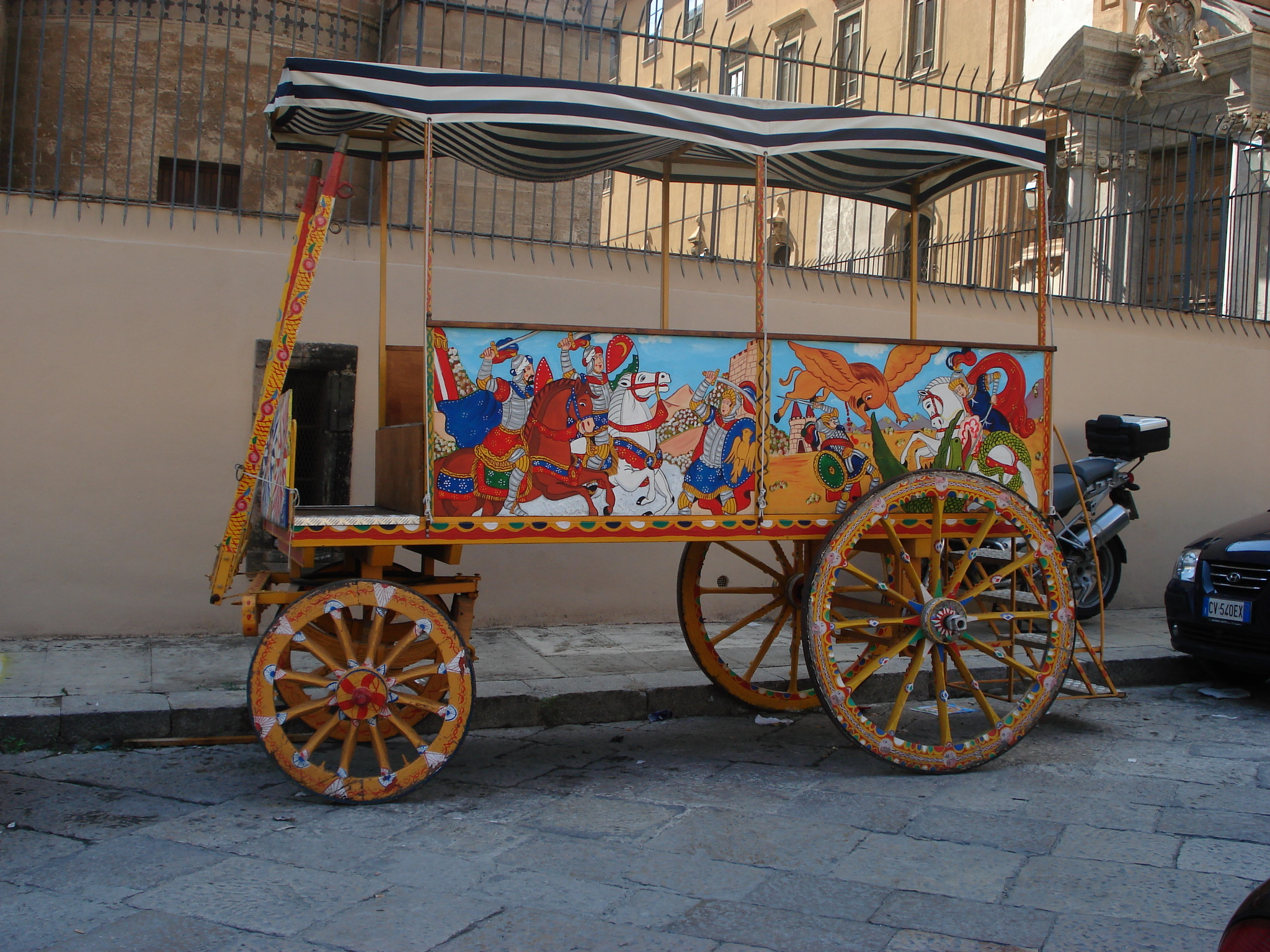
A four-wheeled horse-drawn sight-seeing carretto for tourists

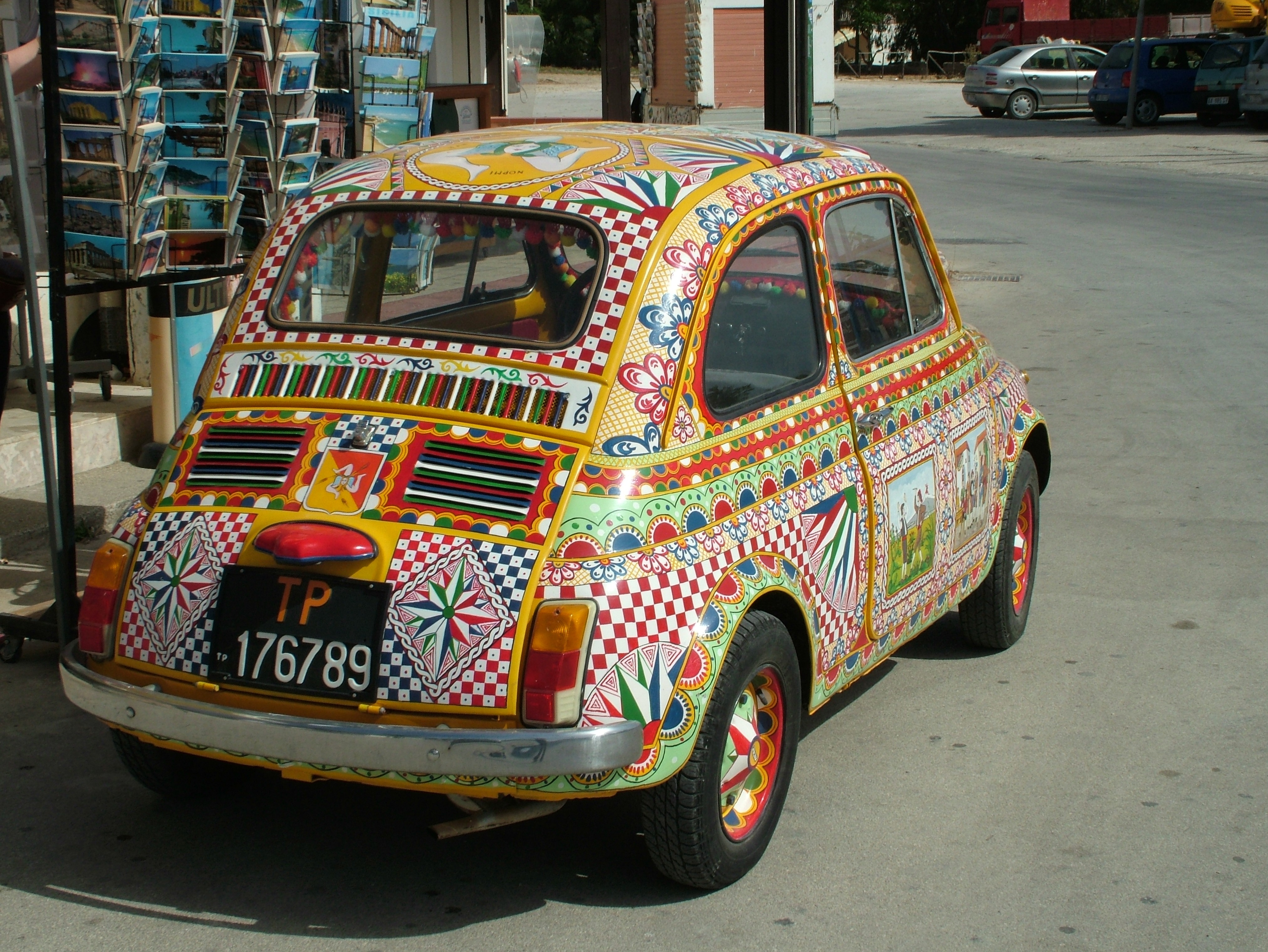
A Fiat 500 painted in the carretto style

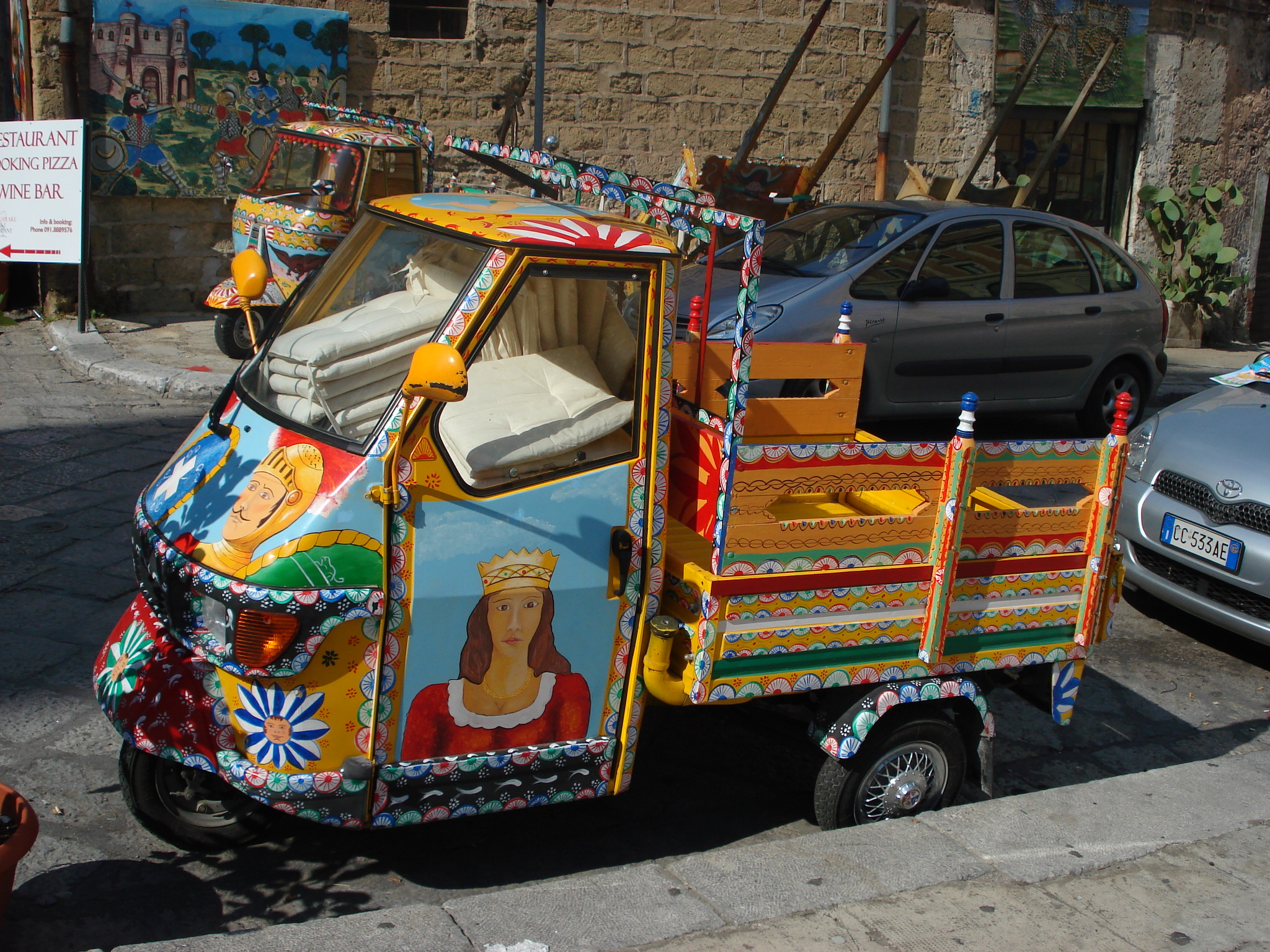
A Piaggio Ape painted in the carretto style

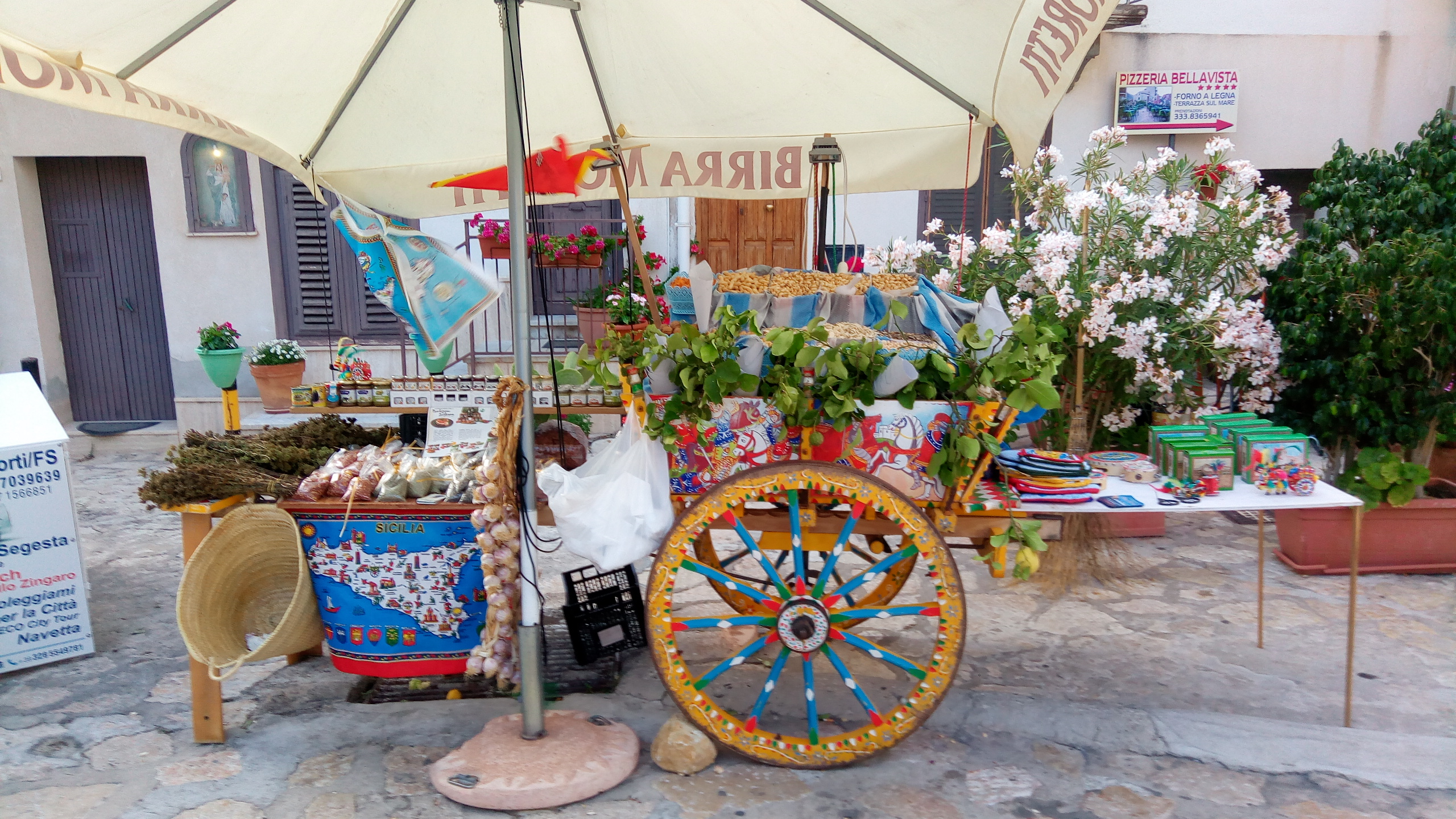
A street vendor's cart
