= John Hersey =

American journalist, novelist and academic (1914–1993)

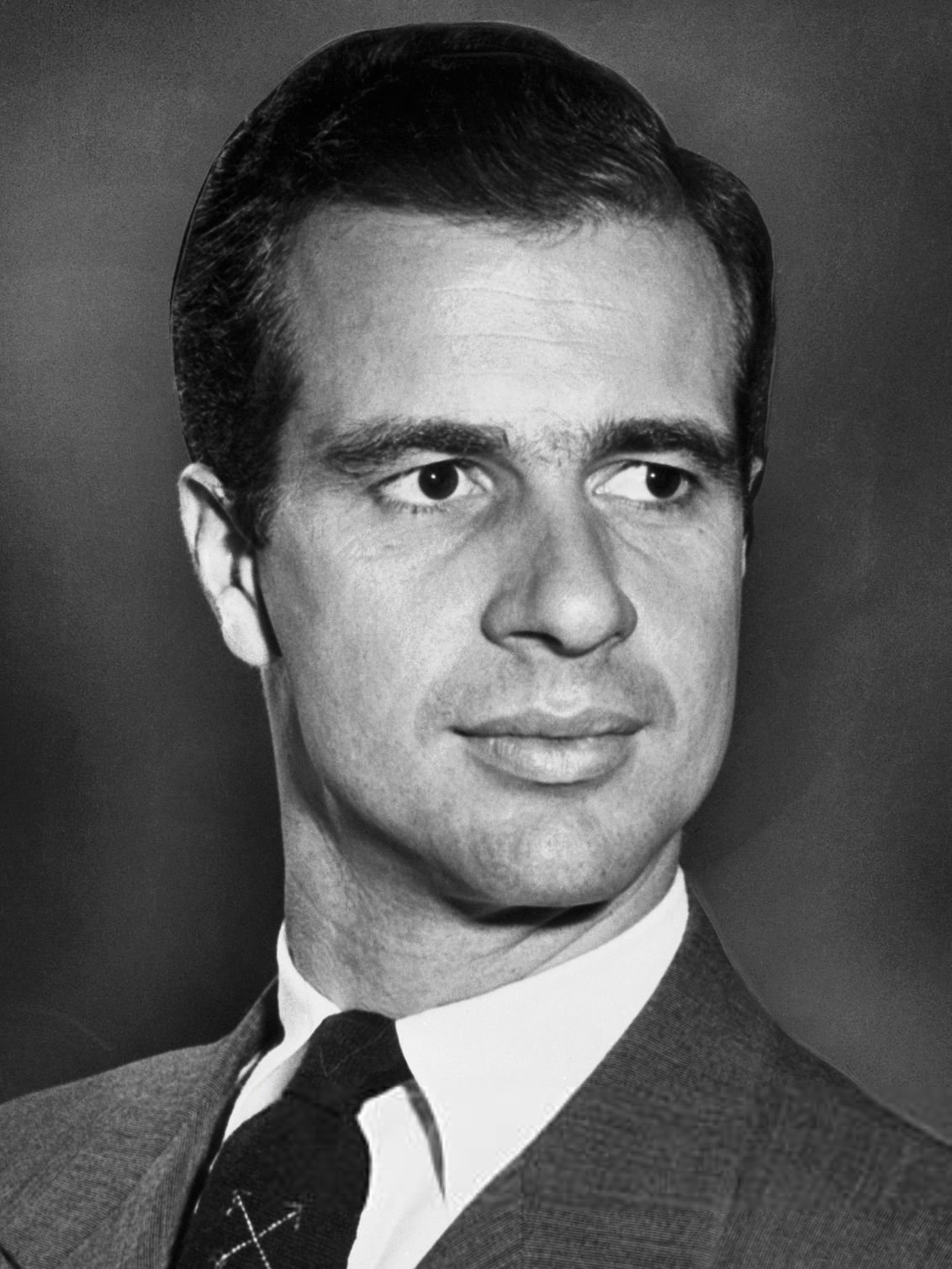
- Hersey c. 1960
- Born: June 17, 1914; Tianjin, China
- Died: March 24, 1993 (aged 78); Key West, Florida, U.S.
- Education: Yale University (BA); Clare College, Cambridge
- Occupations: Journalist; novelist; professor
- Spouses: Frances Ann Cannon (m. 1940; div. 1958); Barbara Day Addams (m. 1959)
- Children: 5
- Writing career
- Notable work: Hiroshima (1946)
- Notable awards: Pulitzer Prize for A Bell for Adano

John Richard Hersey (June 17, 1914 – March 24, 1993) was an American writer and journalist. He is considered one of the earliest practitioners of the so-called New Journalism, in which storytelling techniques of fiction are adapted to non-fiction reportage. In 1999, Hiroshima, Hersey's account of the aftermath of the atomic bomb dropped on Hiroshima, Japan, was adjudged the finest work of American journalism of the 20th century by a 36-member panel associated with New York University's journalism department.

== Background ==
Hersey was born in Tianjin, China, the son of Grace Baird and Roscoe Hersey, Protestant missionaries for the YMCA in Tianjin. Hersey learned to speak Chinese before he spoke English. Later he wrote his novel The Call (1985) on the lives of his parents and several other missionaries of their generation.

John Hersey was a descendant of William Hersey (or Hercy, as the family name was then spelled) of Reading, Berkshire, England. William Hersey was one of the first colonizers of Hingham, Massachusetts in 1635.

Hersey returned to the United States with his family when he was ten years old. He attended public school in Briarcliff Manor, New York, including Briarcliff High School for two years. At Briarcliff, he became his troop's first Eagle Scout. Later he attended the Hotchkiss School. He studied at Yale University, where he worked for the Yale Daily News and was a member of the Skull and Bones Society along with classmates Brendan Gill and Richard A. Moore.

Hersey lettered in football at Yale, where he was coached by Ducky Pond, Greasy Neale, and Gerald Ford. He was a teammate of Larry Kelley and Clint Frank, Yale's two Heisman Trophy winners. He subsequently was selected as a Mellon Fellow for graduate study at Clare College, Cambridge.

== Career ==
After his time at Cambridge, Hersey got a summer job as private secretary and driver for author Sinclair Lewis during 1937. He chafed at those duties, and that autumn he began work for Time, for which he was hired after writing an essay on the magazine's dismal quality. Two years later (1939) he was transferred to Time's Chongqing bureau. In 1940, William Saroyan lists him among "contributing editors" at Time in the play Love's Old Sweet Song.

During World War II, Newsweekly correspondent Hersey covered the fighting in Europe and Asia. He wrote articles for Time and Life magazines. He accompanied Allied troops on their invasion of Sicily, survived four airplane crashes, and was commended by the Secretary of the Navy for his role in helping evacuate wounded soldiers from Guadalcanal. Before writing Hiroshima, Hersey published his novel Of Men and War, an account of war stories seen through the eyes of soldiers rather than a war correspondent. One of the stories in Hersey's novel was inspired by future President John F. Kennedy, who also happened to be a former paramour of Hersey's wife Frances Ann.

After the war, during the winter of 1945–46, Hersey was in Japan, reporting for The New Yorker on the reconstruction of the devastated country, when he found a document written by a Jesuit missionary who had survived the atomic bomb dropped on Hiroshima. The journalist visited the missionary, who introduced him to other survivors.

=== Reporting from Hiroshima ===
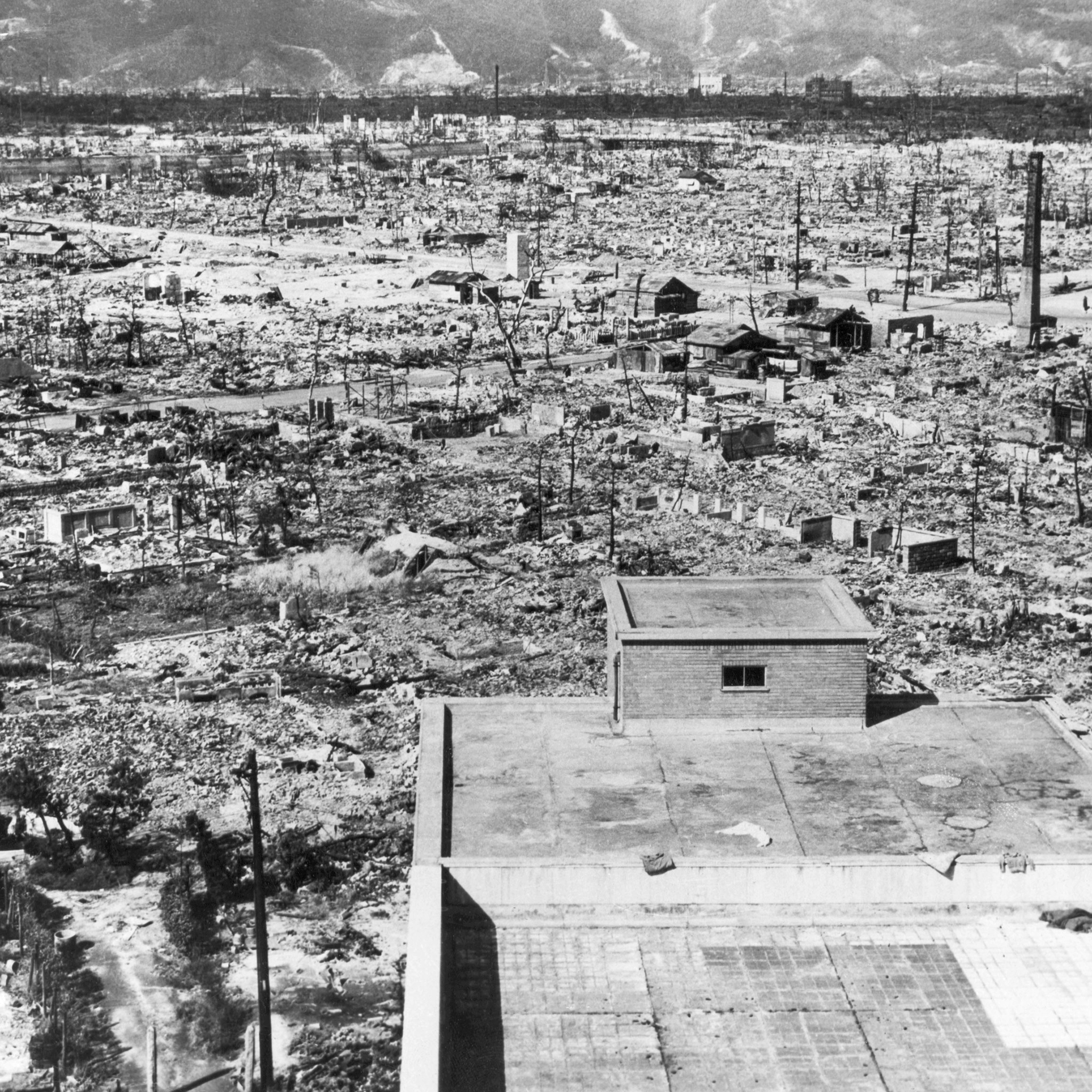
Hiroshima in ruins, October 1945, two months after the atomic bomb exploded

At exactly fifteen minutes past eight in the morning on August 6, 1945, Japanese time, at the moment when the atomic bomb flashed above Hiroshima, Miss Toshiko Sasaki, a clerk in the personnel department of the East Asia Tin Works, had just sat down at her place in the plant office and was turning her head to speak to the girl at the next desk.

— Opening sentence, Hiroshima, John Hersey, 1946

Soon afterward John Hersey began discussions with William Shawn, an editor for The New Yorker, about a lengthy piece on the previous summer's bombing. Hersey proposed a story that would convey the cataclysmic narrative through individuals who survived.

In May 1946, Hersey traveled to Japan, where he spent three weeks doing research and interviewing survivors. He returned to America during late June and began writing the stories of six Hiroshima survivors: a German Jesuit priest, a widowed seamstress, two doctors, a minister, and a young woman who worked in a factory.

The resulting piece was his most notable work, the 31,000-word article "Hiroshima", which was published in the August 31, 1946, issue of The New Yorker. The story dealt with the atomic bomb dropped on that Japanese city on August 6, 1945, and its effects on the six survivors. The article occupied almost the entire issue of the magazine – something The New Yorker had never done before.

=== Later books and college master's job ===
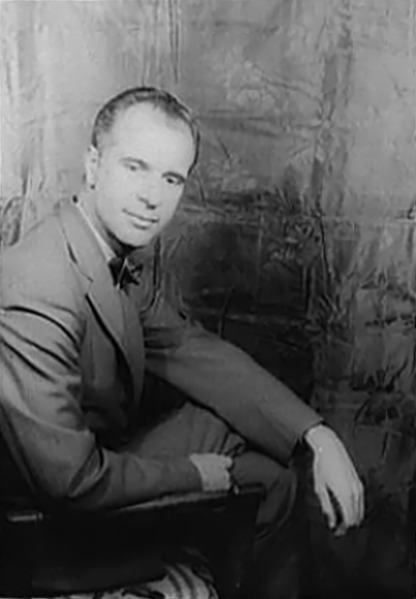
Portrait by Carl Van Vechten, 1958

Hersey often decried the New Journalism, although he had helped create it. He would probably have disagreed that his "Hiroshima" article should be described as New Journalism. Later, the ascetic Hersey came to feel that some elements of the New Journalism of the 1970s were not rigorous enough about fact and reporting. After publication of Hiroshima, Hersey noted that "the important 'flashes' and 'bulletins' are already forgotten by the time yesterday morning's paper is used to line the trash can. The things we remember are emotions and impressions and illusions and images and characters: the elements of fiction."

Soon after writing Hiroshima, the former war correspondent began publishing mostly fiction. Hersey's war novel The Wall (1950) was presented as a rediscovered journal recording the genesis and destruction of the Warsaw Ghetto, the largest of the Jewish ghettos established by Nazi Germany during the Holocaust. The book became a bestseller. It also won the National Jewish Book Award in 1950, the second year after the award was established; and won the Sidney Hillman Foundation Journalism Award.

In 1950, during the Red Scare, Hersey was investigated by the FBI for possible Communist sympathies related to his past speeches and financial contributions, for example to the American Civil Liberties Union. The activities of his brother and other reporters were also investigated.

His article "Why Do Students Bog Down on First R? A Local Committee Sheds Light on a National Problem: Reading" (1954), about the dullness of grammar school readers in an issue of Life magazine, inspired Dr. Seuss's children's story The Cat in the Hat. He also criticized the school system in his novel The Child Buyer (1960), a speculative fiction.

Hersey's first novel A Bell for Adano, about the Allied occupation of a Sicilian town during World War II, won the Pulitzer Prize for the Novel in 1945. It was adapted that year as a movie of the same name, A Bell for Adano, directed by Henry King, and featuring John Hodiak and Gene Tierney. His 1956 short novel, A Single Pebble, recounts the journey of a young American engineer traveling up the Yangtze on a river junk during the 1920s. He learns that his romantic concepts of China brings disaster. In the novel White Lotus (1965), Hersey explores the African-American experience prior to civil rights, as reflected in an alternate history in which white Americans are enslaved by the Chinese after losing "the Great War" to them.

Hersey wrote The Algiers Motel Incident (1968), a non-fiction work about a racially motivated shooting of three young African-American men by police during the 12th Street Riot in Detroit, Michigan, in July 1967.

From 1965 to 1970, Hersey was master of Pierson College, one of twelve residential colleges at Yale University. His outspoken activism and early opposition to the Vietnam War made him controversial with alumni but admired by many students. After the trial of the Black Panthers in New Haven, Connecticut, Hersey wrote Letter to the Alumni (1970). He sympathetically addressed civil rights and anti-war activism – and attempted to explain them to sometimes aggravated alumni.

Hersey also pursued an unusual sideline: he operated the college's small letterpress printing operation, which he sometimes used to publish broadsides. During 1969 he printed an elaborate broadside of an Edmund Burke quote for Elting E. Morison, a Yale history professor and fellow residential college master.

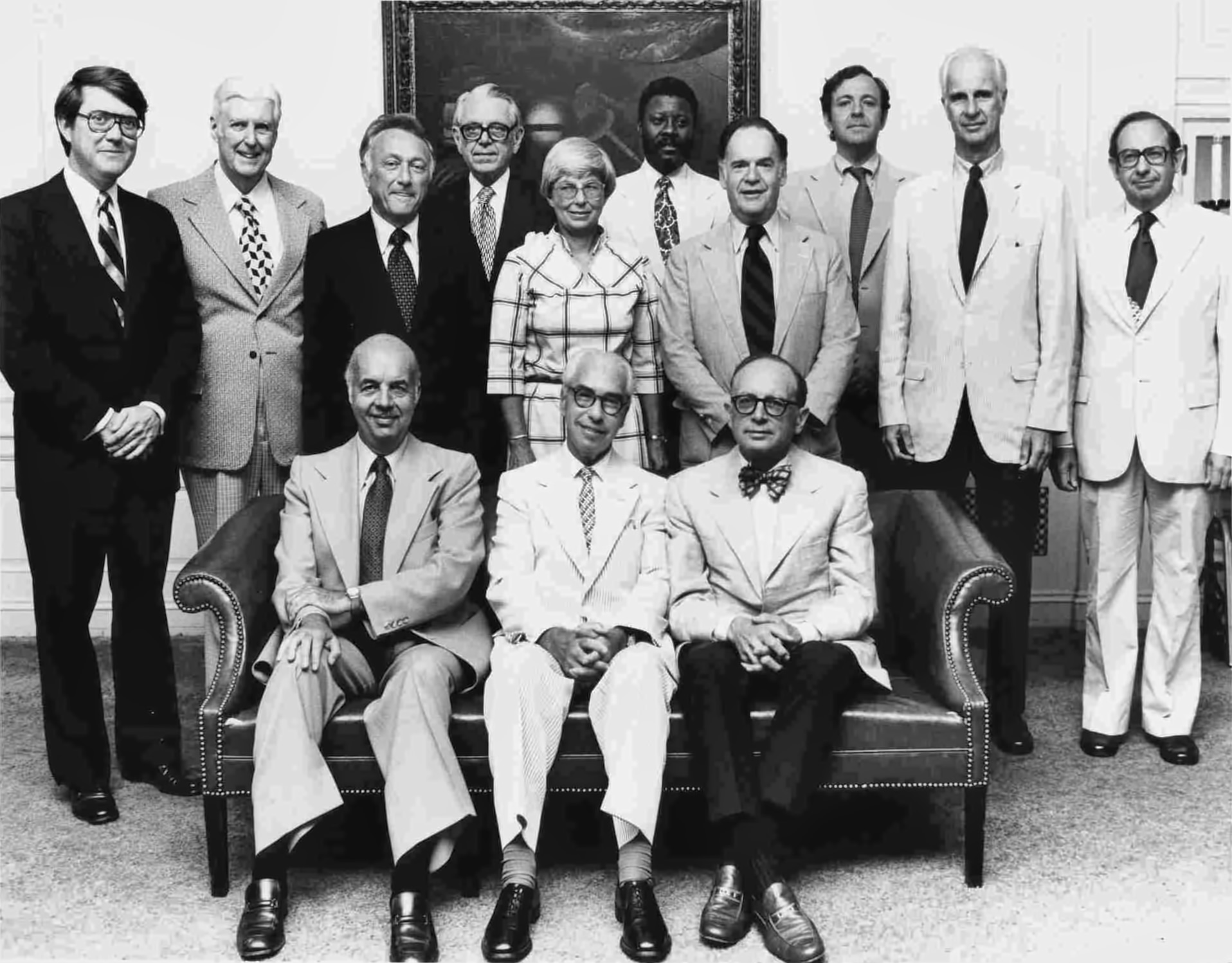
Hersey (standing, second from right) among members and staff of the Commission on New Technological Uses of Copyrighted Works, 1978

For 18 years Hersey taught two writing courses, in fiction and non-fiction, to Yale undergraduates. Hersey taught his last class in fiction writing at Yale during 1984. In his individual sessions with undergraduates to discuss their work, the Pulitzer Prize-winning author was sometimes known to write his comments in the margin. After discussing his suggestion with the student, he would take out his pencil and erase the comment.

As Master of Pierson College, he hosted his old boss Henry Luce – with whom Hersey had become reconciled after their dispute years prior – when Luce spoke to the college's undergraduates. Time founder Luce was a notoriously dull public speaker, and his address to the Pierson undergraduates was no exception. Afterward Luce privately revealed to Hersey for the first time that he and his wife Clare Boothe Luce had taken LSD while supervised by a physician. Hersey later said that he was relieved that Luce had saved that particular revelation for a more private audience.

In 1969 Hersey donated the services of his bulldog 'Oliver' as mascot for the Yale football team, but he was concerned about his dog's interest level as Handsome Dan XI (the Yale bulldog's traditional name). Hersey wondered aloud "whether Oliver would stay awake for two hours." That year, with the new mascot, the Yale team finished the season with a 7–2 record.

During 1985 John Hersey returned to Hiroshima, where he reported and wrote Hiroshima: The Aftermath, a follow-up to his original account. The New Yorker published Hersey's update in its July 15, 1985 issue. The article was subsequently appended to a newly revised edition of the book. "What has kept the world safe from the bomb since 1945 has not been deterrence, in the sense of fear of specific weapons, so much as it's been memory", wrote Hersey. "The memory of what happened at Hiroshima".

Anne Fadiman described Hersey as a "compulsive plagiarist". For instance, she said he used complete paragraphs from the James Agee biography by Laurence Bergreen in his own New Yorker essay about Agee. She said that half of his book, Men on Bataan, came from work her mother, Annalee Jacoby, and her then husband, Melville Jacoby, filed for Time .

== Death ==
A longtime resident of Vineyard Haven, Martha's Vineyard, Massachusetts – chronicled in his 1987 work Blues – John Hersey died at his winter home in Key West, Florida, on March 24, 1993, at the compound he and his wife shared with his friend, writer Ralph Ellison. Ellison's novel Invisible Man was one of Hersey's favorite works, and he often urged students in his fiction-writing seminar to study Ellison's storytelling techniques and descriptive prose. Hersey's death was front-page news in the next day's New York Times. The writer was buried near his home on Martha's Vineyard. He was survived by his second wife, Barbara Jean Day (the former wife of Hersey's colleague at The New Yorker, artist Charles Addams), Hersey's five children, one of whom is the composer and musician Baird Hersey, and six grandchildren. Barbara Hersey died on Martha's Vineyard 14 years later on August 16, 2007.

== Honors ==
On October 5, 2007, the United States Postal Service announced that it would honor five journalists of the 20th century with first-class rate postage stamps, to be issued on Tuesday, April 22, 2008: Martha Gellhorn, John Hersey, George Polk, Rubén Salazar, and Eric Sevareid. Postmaster General Jack Potter announced the stamp series at the Associated Press managing editors meeting in Washington, D.C.

In 1968, John Hersey High School in Arlington Heights, Illinois was named in his honor.

Soon before Hersey's death, then Acting President of Yale Howard Lamar decided the university should honor its long-serving alumnus. The result was the annual John Hersey Lecture, the first of which was delivered March 22, 1993, by historian and Yale graduate David McCullough, who noted Hersey's contributions to Yale but reserved his strongest praise for the former magazine writer's prose. Hersey had "portrayed our time", McCullough observed, "with a breadth and artistry matched by very few. He has given us the century in a great shelf of brilliant work, and we are all his beneficiaries."

The John Hersey Prize at Yale was endowed during 1985 by students of the author and former Pierson College master. The prize is awarded to "a senior or junior for a body of journalistic work reflecting the spirit and ideals of John Hersey: engagement with moral and social issues, responsible reportage and consciousness of craftsmanship." Winners of the John Hersey Prize include David M. Halbfinger (Yale Class of 1990) and Motoko Rich (Class of 1991), who both later had reporting careers for The New York Times, and journalist Jacob Weisberg (Class of 1985), who would become editor-in-chief of The Slate Group. Among Hersey's earlier students at Yale was Michiko Kakutani, formerly the chief book critic of The New York Times, as well as film critic Gene Siskel.

During his lifetime, Hersey served in many jobs associated with writing, journalism and education. He was the first non-academic named master of a Yale residential college. He was past president of the Authors League of America, and he was elected chancellor by the membership of the American Academy of Arts and Letters. Hersey was an honorary fellow of Clare College, Cambridge. He was awarded honorary degrees by Yale University, the New School for Social Research, Syracuse University, Washington and Jefferson College, Wesleyan University, The College of William and Mary and others.

== Works ==
=== Fiction ===
- A Bell for Adano (Knopf, 1944)
- The Wall (Knopf, 1950)
- The Marmot Drive (Knopf, 1953)
- A Single Pebble (Knopf, 1956)
- The War Lover (Knopf, 1959)
- The Child Buyer (Knopf, 1960)
- White Lotus (Knopf, 1965)
- Too Far To Walk (Knopf, 1966)
- Under the Eye of the Storm (Knopf, 1967)
- The Conspiracy (Knopf, 1972)
- My Petition for More Space (Knopf, 1974)
- The Walnut Door (Knopf, 1977)
- The Call (Knopf, 1985)
- Blues (Knopf, 1987)
- Fling and Other Stories (Knopf, 1990)
- Antonietta (Knopf, 1991)
- Key West Tales (Knopf, 1994)

=== Nonfiction ===
- Men on Bataan (Knopf, 1942)
- Into the Valley (Knopf, 1943)
- Hiroshima (Knopf, 1946)
- Here to Stay: Studies in Human Tenacity (Knopf, 1963)
- The Algiers Motel Incident (Knopf, 1968)
- Letter to the Alumni (Knopf, 1970)
- The Writer's Craft (editor) (Knopf, 1974)
- The President (Knopf, 1975)
- Aspects of the Presidency: Truman and Ford in Office (Ticknor & Fields, 1980)
- Life Sketches (Knopf, 1989)
