= Castel Sant'Angelo (Licata) =

Fort in Licata, Sicily, Italy

- Licata, Sicily, Italy
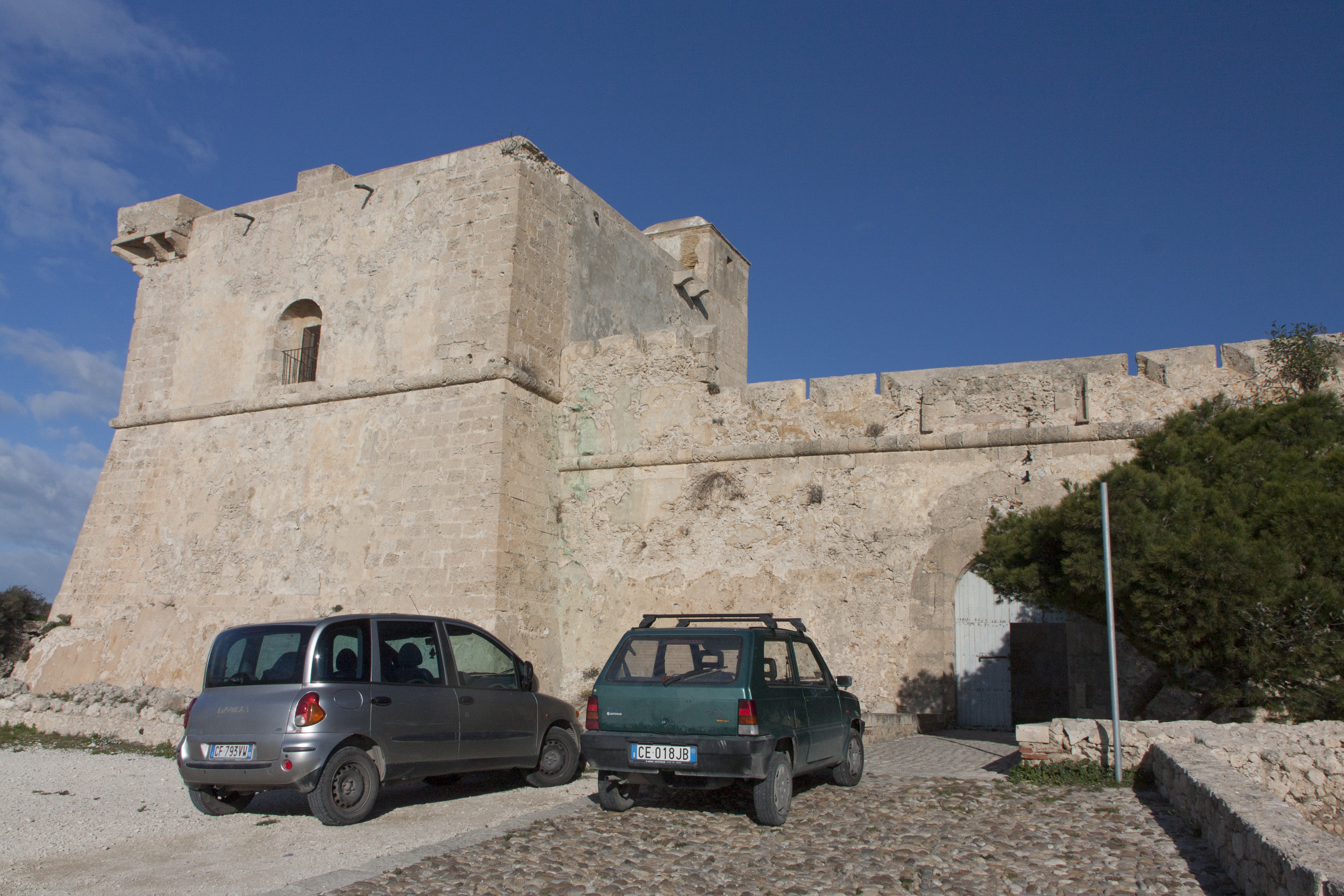
- The tower as photographed in 2017

Site information
- Type: Watchtower; Fort
- Owner: Comune di Licata
- Open to the public: Yes
- Condition: Intact

Location
- Coordinates: 37°6′3″N 13°55′54.3″E

Site history
- Built: 1583–1585 (tower); 1615–1640 (fort)
- Built by: Kingdom of Sicily
- In use: 1585–19th century

Castel Sant'Angelo, also known as Forte Sant'Angelo, is a fort in Licata, Sicily. It was originally built as a watchtower in the 1580s, and was expanded into a fort between 1615 and 1640. Today, the fort is in good condition and is open to the public.

Castel Sant'Angelo is located on the top of Monte Sant'Angelo, a hill 130 m (430 ft) above sea level, overlooking the city to the north and its harbour to the south. Several archaeological sites, including remains of a Hellenistic settlement, can be found in the area.

== History ==
The first fortification to be built on Monte Sant'Angelo was a watchtower, which was constructed between 1583 and 1585 on the orders of Viceroy Marcantonio Colonna. The tower was designed by the military engineer Camillo Camilliani.

In 1615, Hernando Petigno, the general commander of the Royal Cavalry of Sicily and Military Governor of Syracuse, began building a fort on the site, incorporating the tower as the fort's keep. Construction was halted, but it was resumed in 1636 and completed in 1640 under the direction of Serpione Cottone, Marquis d'Altamura.

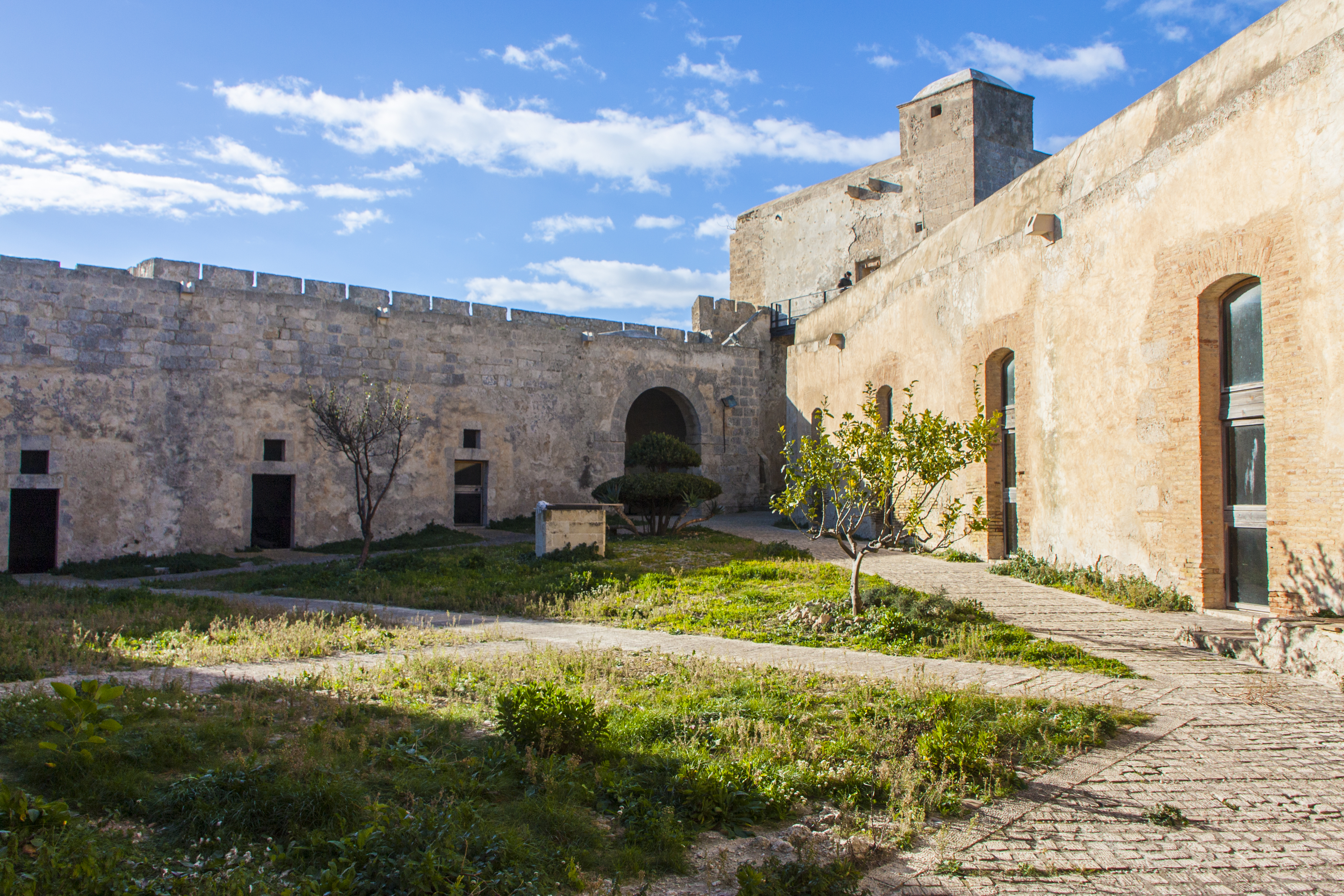
The courtyard of Castel Sant'Angelo as photographed in 2017

The fort never fired its guns in anger, and was decommissioned in the 19th century. It was a telegraph station between 1849 and 1856. In the early 20th century, it became a lighthouse. It was severely damaged during the Allied invasion of Sicily on 10 July 1943, when it was bombarded by USS Brooklyn and USS Buck. The damaged parts of the fort were later repaired.

The lighthouse in Castel Sant'Angelo closed in 1965, and the fort was abandoned. It was declared a historic monument on 8 July 1969, and it was restored in the 1980s.

Today, the fort is in good condition and is open to the public. There are plans to turn it into a museum.

== Layout ==
The fort has a triangular shape, with the 16th-century tower serving as its keep. The fort is built in the Baroque style, and it includes a central courtyard, barracks, stables and warehouses. Access to the fort was only allowed through a drawbridge over a moat. The fort also contained a chapel, but this no longer exists.
