= Licata =

Licata Phyntìas (Greek)
- Comune
- Comune di Licata
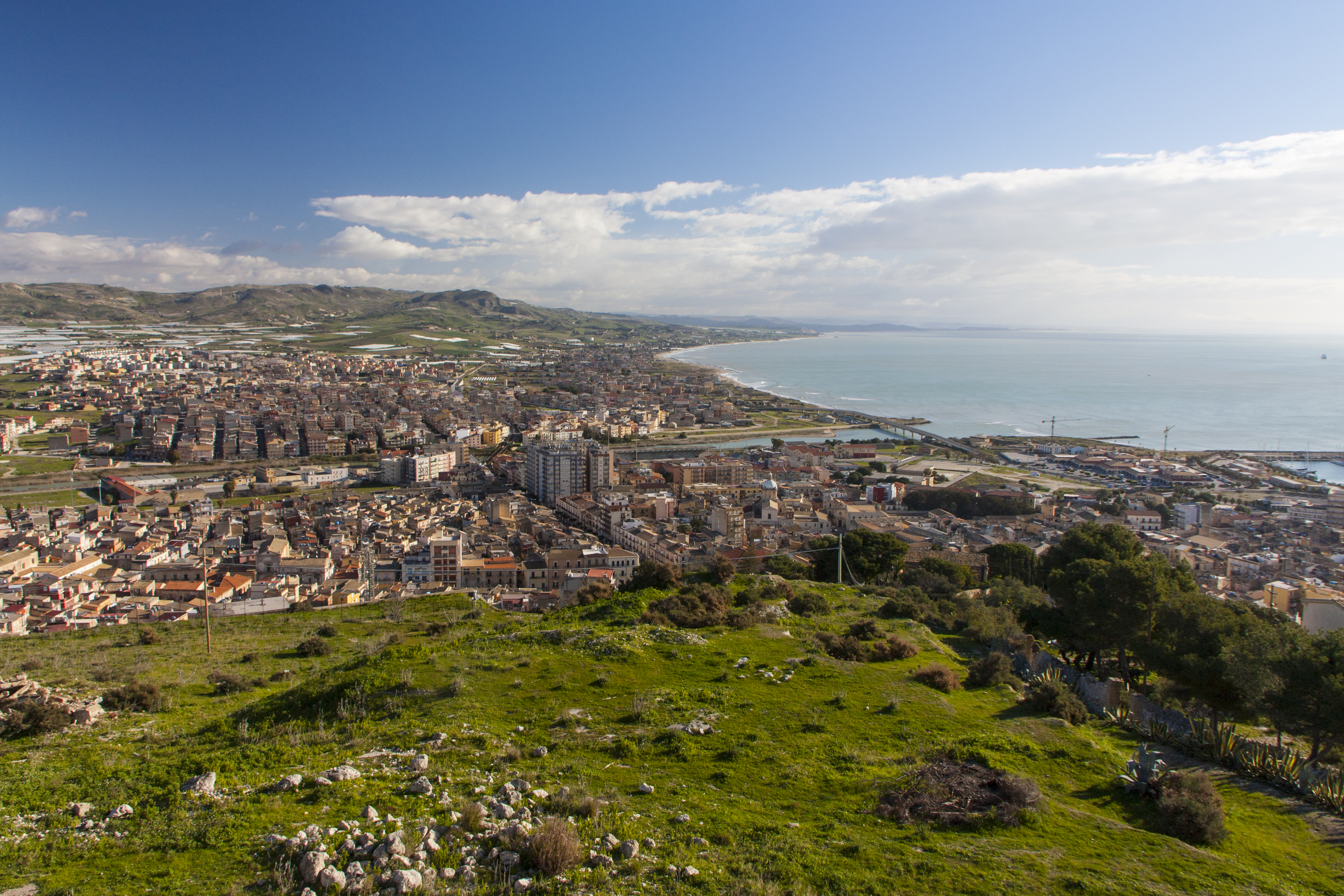
- View of Licata.

- Coat of arms

- Location within Italy Location within Sicily
- Coordinates: 37°06′30″N 13°56′49″E
- Country: Italy
- Region: Sicily
- Province: Agrigento (AG)
- Frazioni: Mollarella, Torre di Gaffe, Nicolizia, Trippodi-Marianello

Government
  - Mayor: Angelo Balsamo

Area
  - Total: 178 km^{2} (69 sq mi)
- Elevation: 8 m (26 ft)

Population (31 January 2019)
  - Total: 36,461
  - Density: 205/km^{2} (531/sq mi)
- Demonym(s): Licatesi, Licatisi
- Time zone: UTC+1 (CET)
  - Summer (DST): UTC+2 (CEST)
- Postal code: 92027
- Dialing code: 0922
- Saint day: May 5, August 16
- Website: Official website

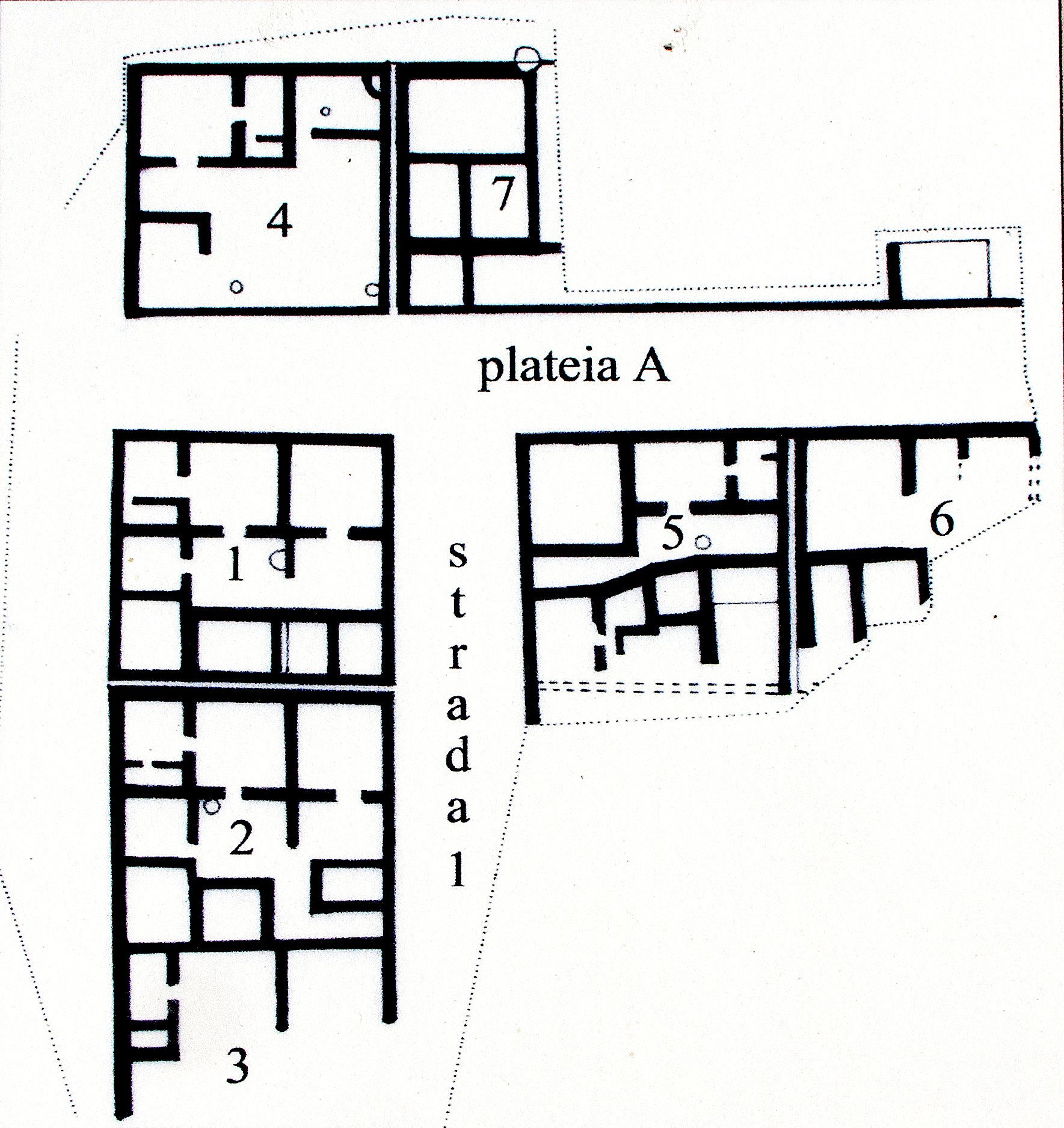
Map of the ancient acropolis

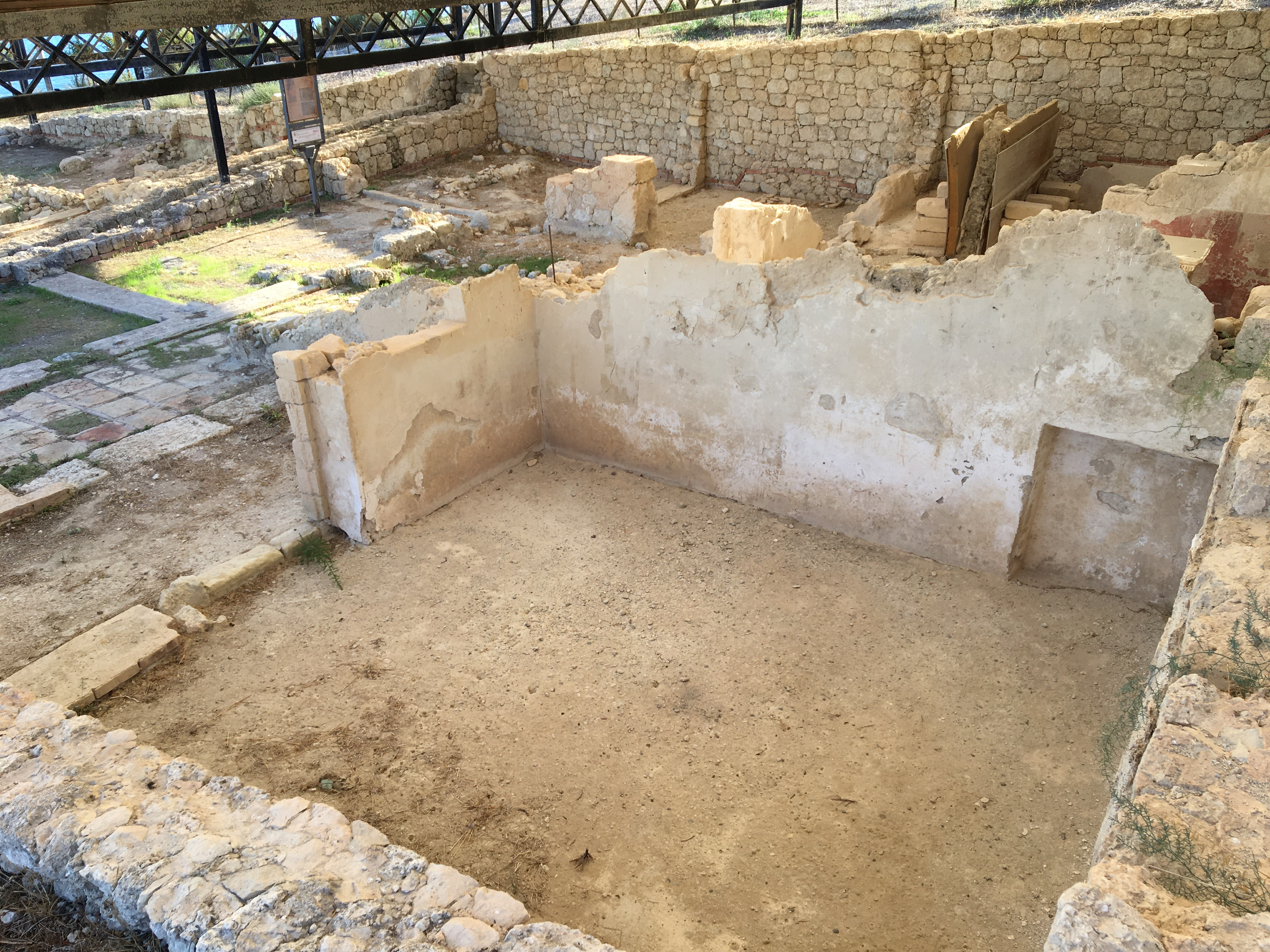
Domus 1

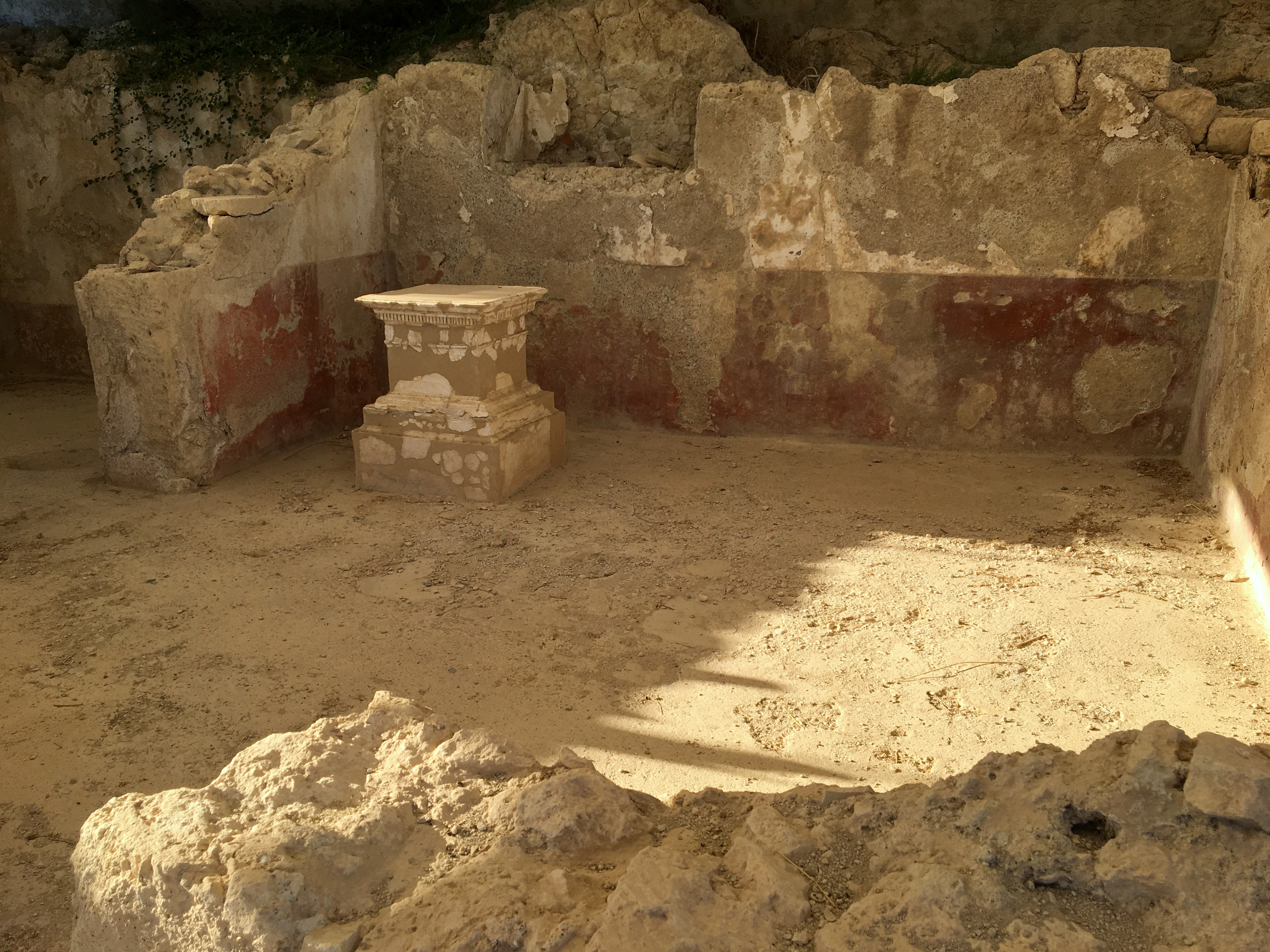
Domus 1

Licata (Italian pronunciation: [liˈkaːta], Sicilian: [lɪˈkaːta]; Ancient Greek: Φιντίας, whence Latin: Phintias or Plintis), formerly also Alicata (Sicilian pronunciation: [alɪˈkaːta]), is a city and comune located on the south coast of Sicily, at the mouth of the Salso River (the ancient Himera), about midway between Agrigento and Gela. It is a major seaport developed at the turn of the twentieth century, shipping sulphur, the refining of which has made Licata the largest European exporting centre, and asphalt, and at times shipping cheese.

West of the port city there is a series of pocket beaches separated by wave-cut headlands as high as 40 metres (130 ft). (Amore 2002).

== History ==
=== Ancient ===
The settlement was frequented by the Phoenicians who traded there between the 12th and 8th centuries BC. At the end of the 7th century BC the Geloi (inhabitants of ancient Gela, in Magna Graecia) built a fortified station to guard the mouth of the Salso (Himera) river. In the first half of 6th century BC Phalaris, tyrant of Agrigento, built a fortified outpost.

The first settlement was probably founded by colonists from Gela.

At the Battle of the Himera River (311 BC) near the town, Agathocles was beaten by the Carthaginians and the town fell into their hands.

The city itself was re-founded on the right bank of the Salso in 282 BC, by Phintias, tyrant of Agrigentum, who named it for himself (Phintias), after razing the city of Gela and resettling its population here. As late as the 1st century BC, inscriptions and coins show that the inhabitants retained the name Geloi.

Phintias was laid out on a great scale, with walls, temples and an agora. The setting took advantage of a small natural harbour, about 80 metres (260 ft) across, in a bay on the coast that is now infilled. The site was protected by the headland now named Monte San Michele. Phintias, however, never rose to the importance of Gela.

At nearby Cape Ecnomus, in 256 BC the Romans won the Battle of Cape Ecnomus in the First Punic War and freed the city from the Carthaginians. In 249 BC it afforded shelter to a Roman fleet which was, however, attacked by the Carthaginians and many of the ships sunk. Cicero also alludes to it as a seaport, carrying on a considerable export trade in corn.

Under the Romans Phintias became a large commercial emporium. But in Strabo's time it seems to have fallen into the same state of decay with the other cities on the south coast of Sicily, as he does not mention it among the few exceptions. Pliny, notices the Phintienses (or Phthinthienses as the name is written in some manuscripts) among the stipendiary towns of Sicily; and its name is found also in Ptolemy; but it is strange that both these writers reckon it among the inland towns of Sicily, though its maritime position is clearly attested both by Diodorus and Cicero. The Antonine Itinerary also gives a place called Plintis, doubtless a corruption of Phintias, which it places on the road from Agrigentum along the coast towards Syracuse, at the distance of 23 miles (37 km) from the former city. This distance agrees tolerably well with that from Agrigento to Licata, though somewhat less.

=== Middle and Modern Ages ===
The historical centre of the town, near the coastal castle of Lympiados, dates from the period of Byzantine domination. In 827 the Arabs conquered Licata, and their rule lasted for more than two centuries, ending when the town was captured by the Normans on July 25, 1086. During the Norman-Hohenstaufen age the town flourished and was awarded the title of Cittè Demaniale ("Crown's City").

In 1270 Licata (then having some 7,000 inhabitants) rebelled against Angevine rule as part of the uprising known as the Sicilian Vespers. Thereafter the town came under the control of the House of Trastámara, who in 1447 granted it the title of fidelissima ("Most Faithful"). In 1553, after the city was sacked by Dragut's corsairs, it was decided to rebuild the walls, together with a large tower which was erected on the summit of Sant'Angelo hill.

Licata began to flourish once more in the 16th century, thanks in part to the presence of a community of Maltese immigrants, and this period of prosperity continued well into the 17th century, when the first settlements appeared outside the wall, housing the growing Maltese community, and numerous buildings were constructed or rebuilt in the Baroque style. The port also enjoyed a period of prosperity, largely resulting from the export of grain.

=== Contemporary era ===
In 1820 Licata rose against the Bourbon rulers of the Kingdom of the Two Sicilies, led by patriot Matteo Vecchio Verderame. During the Expedition of the Thousand under Giuseppe Garibaldi, the town contributed with a whole corps, and housed for a night Garibaldi's son Menotti and his general Nino Bixio.

The 1870s saw the construction of two bridges connecting to the sulphur mines inland, and five refineries (including the then largest in Europe) were built. This brought a considerable economic expansion, leading to the creation of several elegant residences in Licata.

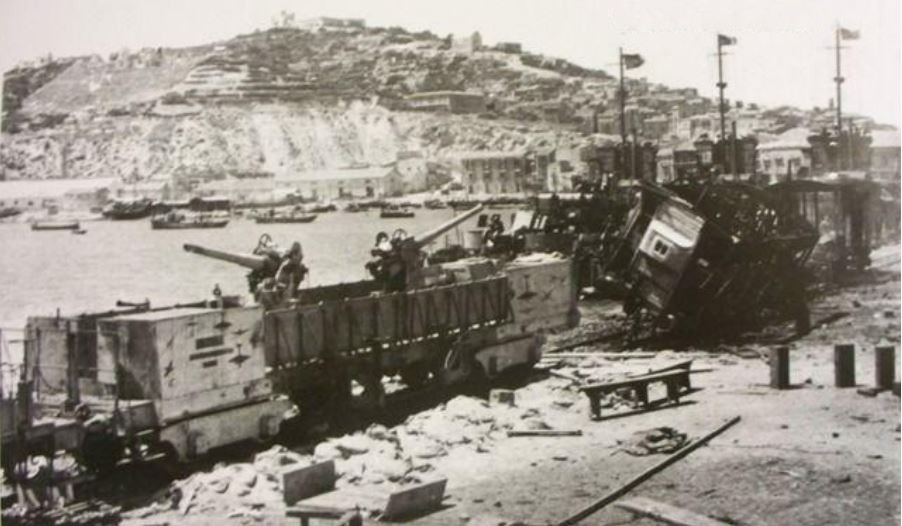
Remains of the Italian Navy armed train ("treno armato") T.A. 76/2/T (it), destroyed by USS Bristol while opposing the landing at Licata.

Licata served as an Allied landing point during the 1943 Operation HUSKY Allied invasion of Sicily of World War II. War damage and the decline in competitiveness in the sulphur industry caused economic decline, forcing many people to emigrate to northern Italy or abroad. As a town occupied by the Allies, it served as a model for John Hersey's novel A Bell for Adano.

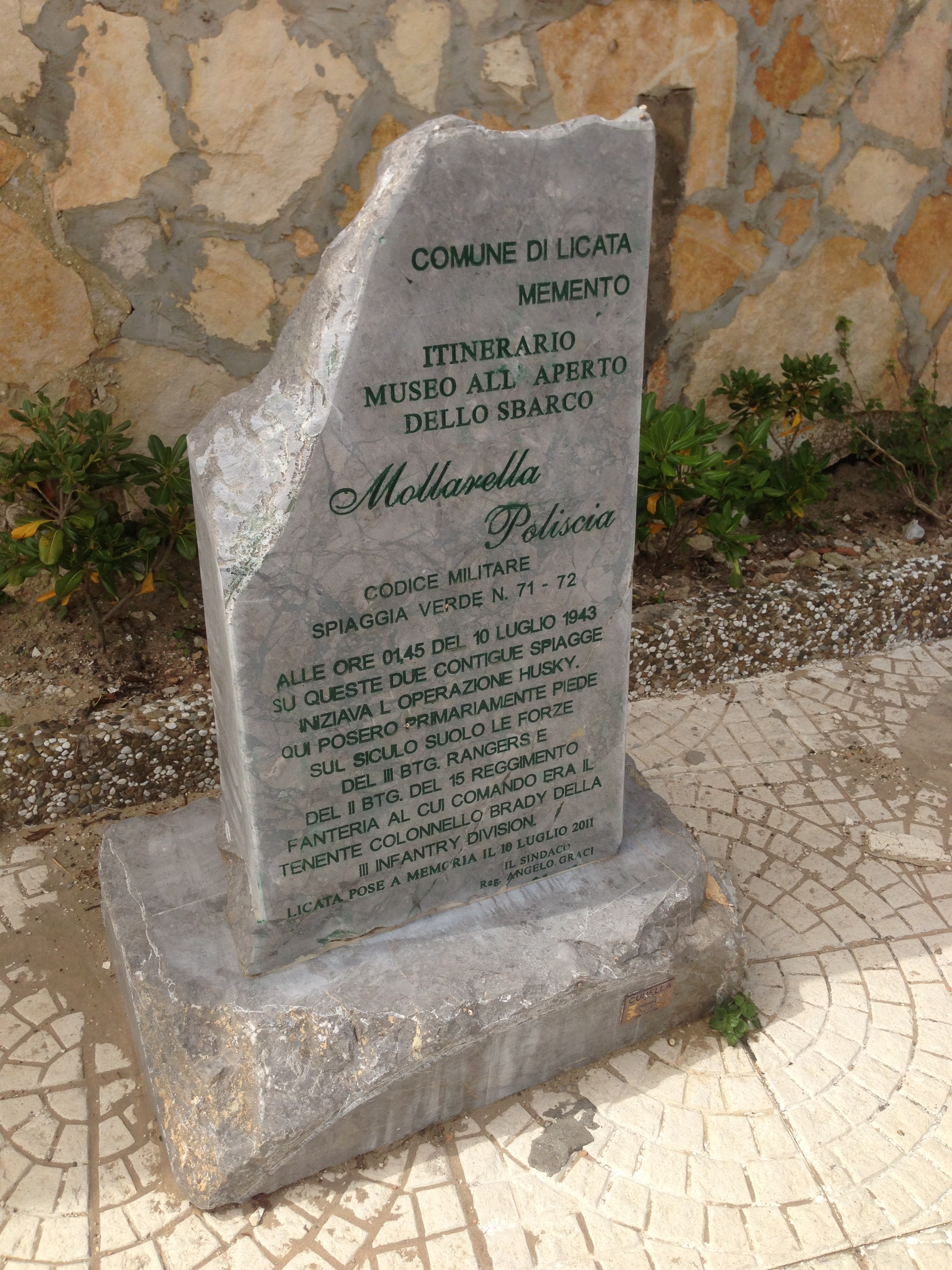
Italian memorial at Licata for the Allied invasion of Sicily during Operation Husky, July 10, 1943.

Licata has however maintained its artistic importance, and tourism has begun to flourish again in recent times. Nevertheless, the economy is heavily reliant on the fishing industry.

== Archaeology ==
The Museo Civico displays many archaeological finds, notably material from burial grounds dating from prehistoric times to the 3rd century BC.

In June 2025, archaeological excavations have revealed domestic and craft environments from the Hellenistic-Roman period. Conducted under the direction of archaeologists Maria Concetta Parello and Alessio Toscano Raffa, the findings include "house 19," which contained an artisan workshop with terracotta molds for oil lamps alongside a domestic sacellum (shrine) with associated ritual objects. Artifacts depicting ancient Greek and Greco-Egyptian deities were also discovered, such as a mold for masks of Gorgon Medusa and cups adorned with medallions of Isis and Serapis.

== Geography ==
The municipality borders with Butera (CL), Camastra, Campobello di Licata, Naro, Palma di Montechiaro and Ravanusa. It counts the hamlets (frazioni) of Mollarella and Torre di Gaffe.

== Main sights ==
- Archaeological remains of the ancient Greek city, including 7 domus near the centre of the city at Monte Sant'Angelo. The 17th century Castel Sant'Angelo is located nearby.
- The necropolis of Monte Petrulla
- The Grangela, and hydraulic work of Pre-Hellenistic times
- Frourion of Falaride, a Greek fortress
- The lighthouse
- Church of Santa Maria La Nova, built in the 15th century but renovated in later years. It houses the Black Christ's Chapel.
- the Carmine (13th century), including a church and a convent, rebuilt in the 18th century under design by Giovanni Biagio Amico.
- Palazzo di Città, a noteworthy example of Sicilian Liberty style, designed by Ernesto Basile.

== Sister cities ==
- Birgu, Malta

== Climate ==
Climate data for Licata, elevation 142 m (466 ft)
Month	Jan	Feb	Mar	Apr	May	Jun	Jul	Aug	Sep	Oct	Nov	Dec	Year
Record high °C (°F)	23.5 (74.3)	25.1 (77.2)	28.1 (82.6)	31.2 (88.2)	33.2 (91.8)	37.5 (99.5)	42.0 (107.6)	40.9 (105.6)	36.5 (97.7)	34.4 (93.9)	29.4 (84.9)	27.3 (81.1)	42.0 (107.6)
Mean daily maximum °C (°F)	16.1 (61.0)	16.1 (61.0)	17.3 (63.1)	19.0 (66.2)	23.5 (74.3)	27.2 (81.0)	30.1 (86.2)	30.6 (87.1)	28.2 (82.8)	25.1 (77.2)	20.7 (69.3)	17.1 (62.8)	22.6 (72.7)
Daily mean °C (°F)	12.2 (54.0)	12.1 (53.8)	13.2 (55.8)	14.8 (58.6)	19.0 (66.2)	22.8 (73.0)	25.5 (77.9)	26.0 (78.8)	23.9 (75.0)	20.8 (69.4)	16.7 (62.1)	13.3 (55.9)	18.4 (65.0)
Mean daily minimum °C (°F)	8.3 (46.9)	8.0 (46.4)	9.1 (48.4)	10.7 (51.3)	14.5 (58.1)	18.4 (65.1)	20.9 (69.6)	21.5 (70.7)	19.6 (67.3)	16.4 (61.5)	12.6 (54.7)	9.5 (49.1)	14.1 (57.4)
Record low °C (°F)	1.3 (34.3)	1.5 (34.7)	1.7 (35.1)	5.4 (41.7)	7.0 (44.6)	10.0 (50.0)	14.7 (58.5)	16.1 (61.0)	10.2 (50.4)	8.8 (47.8)	3.5 (38.3)	3.0 (37.4)	1.3 (34.3)
Average precipitation mm (inches)	72 (2.8)	48 (1.9)	41 (1.6)	30 (1.2)	14 (0.6)	3 (0.1)	3 (0.1)	4 (0.2)	30 (1.2)	60 (2.4)	56 (2.2)	67 (2.6)	428 (16.9)
Source: Regione Siciliana

== See also ==
- A.S.D. Licata 1931
- Licata Airfield
