= Nightmares & Dreamscapes =

Short story collection by Stephen King

- First edition cover
- Author: Stephen King
- Audio read by: Various - See Stories
- Cover artist: Rob Wood
- Language: English
- Genre: Horror, science fiction
- Publisher: Viking
- Publication date: September 29, 1993
- Publication place: United States
- Media type: Print (hardcover), e-book, audiobook
- Pages: 816
- ISBN: 978-0-670-85108-9
- Preceded by: Four Past Midnight
- Followed by: Hearts in Atlantis

Nightmares & Dreamscapes is a short story collection by American author Stephen King, published in 1993.

Audio introduction and notes are read by Stephen King.

== Stories ==
#	Title	Originally published in	Audio read by
1	"Dolan's Cadillac"	Castle Rock, February–June 1985	Rob Lowe
2	"The End of the Whole Mess"	October 1986 issue of Omni	Matthew Broderick
3	"Suffer the Little Children"	February 1972 issue of Cavalier	Whoopi Goldberg
4	"The Night Flier"	Prime Evil (1988)	Frank Muller
5	"Popsy"	Masques II (1987)	Joe Mantegna
6	"It Grows on You"	Fall 1973 issue of Marshroots	Stephen King
7	"Chattery Teeth"	Fall 1992 issue of Cemetery Dance	Kathy Bates
8	"Dedication"	Night Visions 5 (1988)	Lindsay Crouse
9	"The Moving Finger"	December 1990 issue of The Magazine of Fantasy & Science Fiction	Eve Beglarian
10	"Sneakers"	Night Visions 5 (1988)	David Cronenberg
11	"You Know They Got a Hell of a Band"	Shock Rock (1992)	Grace Slick
12	"Home Delivery"	Book of the Dead (1989)	Stephen King
13	"Rainy Season"	Spring 1989 issue of Midnight Graffiti	Yeardley Smith
14	"My Pretty Pony"	My Pretty Pony limited edition coffee table book (1989)	Jerry Garcia
15	"Sorry, Right Number"	from the Tales from the Darkside TV series	Deborah Harmon, Arthur Taxier, Rhonda Dotson, Katherine Britton, Brandon Stewart, Nicole Huntington, Catherine Battistone and Paul Sparer
16	"The Ten O'Clock People"	Previously Unpublished	Joe Morton
17	"Crouch End"	New Tales of the Cthulhu Mythos (1980)	Tim Curry
18	"The House on Maple Street"	Previously unpublished	Tabitha King
19	"The Fifth Quarter"	April 1972 issue of Cavalier	Gary Sinise
20	"The Doctor's Case"	The New Adventures of Sherlock Holmes (1987)	Tim Curry
21	"Umney's Last Case"	Previously unpublished	Robert B. Parker
22	"Head Down"	April 16, 1990 issue of The New Yorker	Stephen King
23	"Brooklyn August"	Io No. 10, 1971	Stephen J. Gould
24	"The Beggar and the Diamond"	Previously unpublished	Domenic Cuskern

== Dedication ==
King dedicated this collection of stories to Thomas Williams, a writing instructor who taught for many years at the University of New Hampshire. Since the book's publication, King has singled out Williams' 1974 National Book Award-winning novel The Hair of Harold Roux as a favorite of his, and one he returns to "again and again."

The dedication reads:

In memory of
THOMAS WILLIAMS,
1926–1990:
poet, novelist, and
great American storyteller.

== Adaptations ==
=== Film and television ===
"Sorry, Right Number" was telecast as a season 4 episode of Tales from the Darkside in 1987 before it was published in Nightmares & Dreamscapes. "The Moving Finger" was adapted into a season 3 episode of Monsters in 1991. "Chattery Teeth" was adapted into a segment of the 1997 film Quicksilver Highway. "The Night Flier" and "Dolan's Cadillac" were both adapted into films of the same respective names, in 1997 and 2009, respectively. "Home Delivery" and "Rainy Season" were adapted into short films.

=== Miniseries ===
During the summer of 2006, TNT produced the eight-episode miniseries Nightmares & Dreamscapes: From the Stories of Stephen King. Despite the title, three of the eight stories were not culled from the book: "Battleground", from Night Shift (1978); and "The Road Virus Heads North" and "Autopsy Room Four", from Everything's Eventual (2002).

== See also ==
- 1993 in literature
- Stephen King short fiction bibliography
