= Dolan's Cadillac =

Dolan's Cadillac may refer to:

- "Dolan's Cadillac" (short story), a 1989 short story by Stephen King
- Dolan's Cadillac (film), a 2009 crime film, based on the short story
