= Penguin 60s =

Miniature books of 60 pages sold as part of the 60th anniversary of Penguin Books

To celebrate its 60th anniversary circa 1995, Penguin Books released several boxed sets of "Penguin 60s", miniature books about sixty pages in length. The books were also sold individually.

The main set, with black spines, (ISBN 0140952721, ISBN 978-0-14-095272-8) contained 60 "classic" works. The UK set with orange spines (ISBN 0140951792 / ISBN 978-0-14-095179-0) focused on 20th century or contemporary writers and contained 60 books. A similar set of 60 orange spine books was released for the US market with 13 books in common with the UK set. Smaller, ten item sets focusing on biography/autobiography, travel and cookery were also issued. A children's set (ISBN 0140953361) was released, consisting of 30 volumes.

Further books in the series were planned but were cancelled due to increasingly poor sales. Thirty Obituaries of Wisden selected by Matthew Engel (ISBN 0146002482, ISBN 978-0-14-600248-9) was published but did not appear in any of the other sets of books. Ten orange spine books were released as a limited edition boxed set sold through Blackwell's bookshops in the UK (ISBN 0140954139) with Stephen King's Umney's Last Case the only title appearing in the US orange spine editions. The other nine titles in the Blackwells set were unique titles that did not appear in the other sets (Surprised by Summer by David Lodge, Postcards from Summer by Peter Mayle, Lizzie Borden by Angela Carter, The Girl Who Loved Graveyards by P.D. James, Expulsion from Paradise by Howard Jacobson, Meeting Bilal by Esther Freud, The Rock of Crack as Big as the Ritz by Will Self, The Pocket Watchmaker by Richard Dawkins and Scenes from the Dwarf by Rob Grant and Doug Naylor). Another 18 titles are listed at the back of the biography and travel editions but were not published.

The American orange spine set and British orange spine set only had 13 books that were in common. They are:

1. Hans Christian Andersen – The Emperor's New Clothes
2. Anton Chekhov – The Black Monk and Peasants
3. Roald Dahl – Lamb to the Slaughter and Other Stories
4. Sir Arthur Conan Doyle – The Man with the Twisted Lip and The Adventure of the Devil's Foot
5. Graham Greene – Under the Garden
6. Rudyard Kipling – Baa Baa, Black Sheep and The Gardener
7. Gabriel García Márquez – Bon Voyage, Mr President and Other Stories
8. Herman Melville – Bartleby and The Lightning-Rod Man
9. Michel De Montaigne – Four Essays
10. John Mortimer – Rumpole and the Younger Generation
11. Edgar Allan Poe – The Pit and the Pendulum and Other Stories
12. Edith Wharton – Madame de Treymes
13. Oscar Wilde – The Happy Prince and Other Stories

== Series ==
=== Black set (60) ===
(ISBN 0140882677)

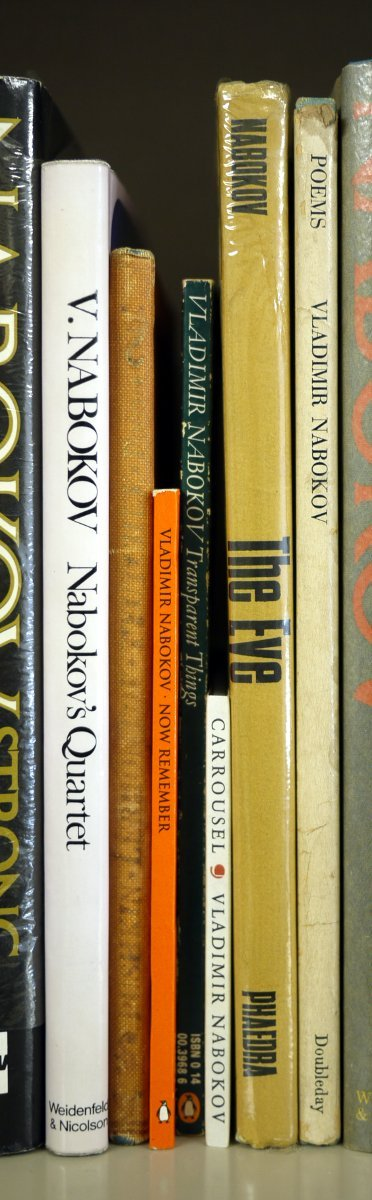
With the traditional Penguin spine colour: Now Remember by Nabokov (next to a Penguin of regular format, Nabokov's Transparent Things)

1. Jane Austen – The History of England
2. Apollonius of Rhodes – Jason and the Argonauts
3. Aristophanes – Lysistrata
4. Balzac – The Atheist's Mass
5. Boccaccio – Ten Tales from the Decameron
6. Beowulf and Grendel
7. Buddha's Teachings
8. James Boswell – Meeting Dr Johnson
9. Matsuo Bashō – Haiku
10. Thomas Carlyle – On Great Men
11. Charlotte Perkins Gilman – The Yellow Wallpaper
12. Charlotte Brontë – Mina Laury
13. Cao Xueqin – Dream of the Red Chamber
14. Miguel de Cervantes – The Jealous Extremaduran
15. Castiglione – Etiquette for Renaissance Gentlemen
16. Joseph Conrad – The Secret Sharer
17. Charles Darwin – The Galapagos Islands
18. Dostoyevsky – The Gentle Spirit
19. Bernal Díaz del Castillo – The Betrayal of Montezuma
20. Frederick Douglass – The Education of Frederick Douglass
21. Dante – The First Three Circles of Hell
22. De Quincey – The Pleasures and Pains of Opium
23. Daniel Defoe – A Visitation of the Plague
24. Benjamin Franklin – The Means and Manner of Obtaining Virtue
25. Flaubert – A Simple Heart
26. Gibbon – Reflections of the Fall of Rome
27. Gilgamesh and Enkidu
28. Goethe – Letters from Italy
29. George Eliot – The Lifted Veil
30. Henry David Thoreau – Civil Disobedience
31. Henry James – The Lesson of the Master
32. Homer – The Rage of Achilles
33. Homer – The Voyages of Odysseus
34. Franz Kafka – The Judgement and In the Penal Colony
35. Krishna's Dialogue on the Soul
36. Kate Chopin – The Kiss
37. Heinrich von Kleist – The Marquise of O
38. Livy – Hannibal's Crossing of the Alps
39. Machiavelli – The Art of War
40. Thomas Malory – The Death of King Arthur
41. Maupassant – Boule de Suif
42. Nietzsche – Zarathustra's Discourses
43. Ovid – Orpheus in the Underworld
44. Edgar Allan Poe – The Murders in the Rue Morgue
45. Plato – Phaedrus
46. Rimbaud – A Season in Hell
47. Jean-Jacques Rousseau – Meditations of a Solitary Walker
48. Saint Augustine – Confessions of a Sinner
49. Robert Louis Stevenson – Dr. Jekyll and Mr. Hyde
50. Thomas à Kempis – Counsels on the Spiritual Life
51. Two Viking Romances
52. Tolstoy – The Death of Ivan Ilyich
53. Tales of Cú Chulainn
54. Turgenev – Three Sketches from a Hunter Diary
55. Mark Twain – The Man That Corrupted Hadleyburg
56. Tacitus – Nero and the Burning of Rome
57. Vasari – Lives of Three Renaissance Artists
58. Edith Wharton – Souls Belated
59. Oscar Wilde – The Portrait of Mr. W. H.
60. Walt Whitman – Song of Myself

=== Orange set (UK titles) ===
(ISBN 0140951792)

1. Martin Amis – God's Dice
2. Hans Christian Andersen – The Emperor's New Clothes
3. Marcus Aurelius – Meditations
4. James Baldwin – Sonny's Blues
5. Ambrose Bierce – An Occurrence at Owl Creek Bridge
6. Dirk Bogarde – From Le Pigeonnier
7. William Boyd – Killing Lizards
8. Poppy Z Brite – His Mouth Will Taste of Wormwood
9. Italo Calvino – Ten Italian Folktales
10. Albert Camus – Summer
11. Truman Capote – First and Last
12. Raymond Chandler – Goldfish
13. Anton Chekhov – The Black Monk
14. Roald Dahl – Lamb to the Slaughter
15. Elizabeth David – I'll Be with You in the Squeezing of a Lemon
16. The Seven Voyages of Sinbad the Sailor
17. Karen Blixen – The Dreaming Child
18. Arthur Conan Doyle – The Man with the Twisted Lip
19. Dick Francis – Racing Classics
20. Sigmund Freud – Five Lectures on Psycho-Analysis
21. Kahlil Gibran – Prophet, Madman, Wanderer
22. Stephen Jay Gould – Adam's Navel
23. Alasdair Gray – Five Letters from an Eastern Empire
24. Graham Greene – Under the Garden
25. James Herriot – Seven Yorkshire Tales
26. Patricia Highsmith – Little Tales of Misogyny
27. M. R. James and R. L. Stevenson – The Haunted Dolls' House
28. Rudyard Kipling – Baa Baa Black Sheep
29. Penelope Lively – A Long Night at Abu Simbel
30. Katherine Mansfield – The Escape
31. Gabriel García Márquez – Bon Voyage, Mr. President
32. Patrick McGrath – The Angel
33. Herman Melville – Bartleby
34. Spike Milligan – Gunner Milligan, 954024
35. Michel de Montaigne – Four Essays
36. Jan Morris – From the Four Corners
37. John Mortimer – Rumpole and the Younger Generation
38. R. K. Narayan – Tales from Malgudi
39. Anaïs Nin – A Model
40. Frank O'Connor – The Genius
41. George Orwell – Pages from a Scullion's Diary
42. Camille Paglia – Sex and Violence, or Nature and Art
43. Sara Paretsky – A Taste of Life
44. Edgar Allan Poe – The Pit and the Pendulum
45. Miss Read – Village Christmas
46. Jean Rhys – Let Them Call It Jazz
47. Damon Runyon – The Snatching of Bookie Bob
48. Saki – The Secret Sin of Septimus Brope
49. Will Self – Scale
50. Georges Simenon – Death of a Nobody
51. Muriel Spark – The Portobello Road
52. Robert Louis Stevenson – The Pavilion on the Links
53. Paul Theroux – Down the Yangtze
54. William Trevor – Matilda's England
55. Mark Tully – Ram Chander's Story
56. John Updike – Friends from Philadelphia
57. Eudora Welty – Why I Live at the P.O.
58. Edith Wharton – Madame de Treymes
59. Oscar Wilde – The Happy Prince
60. Virginia Woolf – Killing the Angel in the House

=== Orange set (US Titles) ===
1. Louisa May Alcott – An Old Fashioned Thanksgiving
2. Hans Christian Andersen – The Emperor's New Clothes
3. J. M. Barrie – Peter Pan in Kensington Gardens
4. William Blake – Songs of Innocence and Experience
5. Geoffrey Chaucer – The Wife of Bath and Other Canterbury Tales
6. Anton Chekhov – The Black Monk and Peasants
7. Samuel Taylor Coleridge – The Rime of the Ancient Mariner and Other Poems
8. Colette – Gigi
9. Joseph Conrad – Youth: A Narrative
10. Roald Dahl – Lamb to the Slaughter and Other Stories
11. Robertson Davies – A Gathering of Ghost Stories
12. Fydor Dostoevsky – The Grand Inquisitor
13. Sir Arthur Conan Doyle – The Man with the Twisted Lip and The Adventure of the Devil's Foot
14. Ralph Waldo Emerson – Nature
15. Omer Englebert – The Lives of the Saints
16. Fannie Merritt Farmer – Selections from the Original 1896 Boston Cooking-School Cookbook
17. Edward Fitzgerald – The Rubaiyat of Omar Khayyam
18. Robert Frost – The Road Not Taken and Other Poems
19. Gabriel García Márquez – Bon Voyage, Mr President and Other Stories
20. Nikolai Gogol – The Overcoat and The Nose
21. Graham Greene – Under the Garden
22. Jacob And Wilhelm Grimm – Grimms' Fairy Tales
23. Nathaniel Hawthorne – Young Goodman Brown and Other Stories
24. O. Henry – The Gift of the Magi and Other Stories
25. Washington Irving – Rip Van Winkle and the Legend of Sleepy Hollow
26. Henry James – Daisy Miller: A Comedy
27. V. S. Vernon Jones – Aesop's Fables
28. James Joyce – The Dead
29. Garrison Keillor – Truckstop and Other Lake Wobegon Stories
30. Jack Kerouac – San Francisco Blues
31. Stephen King – Umney's Last Case
32. Rudyard Kipling – Baa Baa, Black Sheep and The Gardener
33. Lao Tzu – Tao Te Ching
34. D. H. Lawrence – Love Among the Haystacks
35. Abraham Lincoln – The Gettysburg Address and Other Speeches
36. Jack London – To Build a Fire and Other Stories
37. Herman Melville – Bartleby and The Lightning-Rod Man
38. A. A. Milne – Winnie-the-Pooh and his Friends
39. Michel De Montaigne – Four Essays
40. John Mortimer – Rumpole and the Younger Generation
41. Thomas Paine – The Crisis
42. Dorothy Parker – Big Blonde and Other Stories
43. Edgar Allan Poe – The Pit and the Pendulum and Other Stories
44. Edgar Allan Poe, Ambrose Pierce and Robert Louis Stevenson- Three Tales of Horror
45. Franklin D. Roosevelt – Fireside Chats
46. William Shakespeare – Sixty Sonnets
47. John Steinbeck – The Chrysanthemums and Other Stories
48. Peter Straub – Blue Rose
49. Paul Theroux – The Greenest Island
50. Henry David Thoreau – Walking
51. John Thorn – Baseball: Our Game
52. Leo Tolstoy – Master and Man
53. Mark Twain – The Notorious Jumping Frog of Calaveras County and Other Stories (5 stories)
54. H.G. Wells – The Time Machine
55. Edith Wharton – Madame de Treymes
56. Oscar Wilde – The Happy Prince and Other Stories
57. The Declaration of Independence and the Constitution of the United States
58. Mother Goose – Mother Goose
59. The Revelation of St. John the Divine: Holy Bible KJV
60. Teachings of Jesus: Holy Bible KJV

=== Biography set (10) ===
(ISBN 0140953531)

1. Richard Ellmann – The Trial of Oscar Wilde
2. Laurie Lee – The War in Spain
3. Dirk Bogarde – Coming of Age
4. Anthony Burgess – Childhood
5. Vladimir Nabokov – Now Remember
6. Marianne Faithfull – Year One
7. Barry Humphries – Less is More Please
8. Lytton Strachey – Florence Nightingale
9. Katharine Hepburn – Little Me
10. Blake Morrison – Camp Cuba

=== Cookery set (10) ===
(ISBN 0140953485)

1. Keith Floyd – Hot and Spicy Floyd
2. Rick Stein – Fresh from the Sea
3. Margaret Visser – More than Meets the Eye
4. Elizabeth David – Peperonata and other Italian Dishes
5. Nigel Slater – 30-Minute Suppers
6. Helge Rubinstein – Chocolate Parfait
7. Jane Grigson – Puddings
8. Sophie Grigson – From Sophie's Table
9. Claudia Roden – Ful Medames and other Vegetarian Dishes
10. Lindsey Bareham – The Little Book of Big Soups

=== Travel set (10) ===
(ISBN 0140953507)

1. Jan Morris – Scenes from Havian Life
2. Gavin Young – Something of Samoa
3. Colin Thubron – Smarkand
4. Paul Theroux – Slow Trains to Simla
5. Mark Shand – Elephant Tales
6. Redmond O'Hanlon – A River in Borneo
7. Alexander Frater – Where the Dawn Comes Up Like Thunder
8. Patrick Leigh Fermor – Loose as the Wind
9. Karen Blixen – From the Ngong Hills
10. Mark Tully – Beyond Purdah

=== Children's set (30) ===
(ISBN 0140953361)

1. Roger Lancelyn Green – Robin Hood and his Merry Men
2. King Arthurs Court
3. Four Great Greek Myths
4. Classic Nonsense Verse
5. Alf Proysen – Mrs. Pepperpot Turns Detective
6. Philip Ridley – The Hooligan's Shampoo
7. N J Dawood – Ali Baba & The Forty Thieves
8. Paul Jennings – Three Quirky Tails
9. Mark Twain – Tom Sawyer's Pirate Adventure
10. Allan Ahlberg – The Night Train
11. Joan Aiken – Dead Man's Lane
12. Astrid Lindgren – The Amazing Pippi Longstocking
13. Tove Jansson – Moomintrolls and Friends
14. Lewis Carroll – Tailes from Alice in Wonderland
15. Margaret Mahy – The Midnight Story
16. Philippa Pearce – At the River Gates
17. Dick King-Smith – The Clockwork Mouse
18. Sir Arthur Conan Doyle – Sherlock Holmes and the Speckled Band
19. Anne Fine – Keep It in the Family
20. Michael Rosen – Smacking My Lips
21. Brothers Grimm – Tom Thumb
22. Jon Scieszka – The Great Time Warp Adventure
23. Roald Dahl – The Great Mouse Plot
24. The Pied Piper of Hamelin
25. Classic Ghost Stories
26. L. M. Montgomery – Anne at Green Gables
27. Hans Christian Andersen – The Little Mermaid
28. Terry Jones – The Dragon on the Roof
29. Rudyard Kipling – Tales from The Jungle Book
30. Penelope Lively – Lost Dog
