= The Reploids =

- Short story by Stephen King
- Country: United States
- Language: English
- Genre: Science fiction

Publication
- Published in: Night Visions 5
- Publication type: Anthology
- Media type: Print (hardcover)
- Publication date: 1988

Chronology
Dedication	Sneakers

"The Reploids" is a science fiction short story by American writer Stephen King. It was first published in the 1988 book Night Visions 5.

== Plot summary ==
The story takes place on 29 November 1989 in Burbank, California. A mysterious man named Edward Paladin shows up in place of Johnny Carson on The Tonight Show, but all is not what it seems. A subsequent investigation by detectives Richard Cheyney and Pete Jacoby finds strange items in his possession, hinting that he may not be from our reality. These include passes for the studio which are the wrong color and a bright blue one dollar bill with a picture of James Madison on it rather than one of George Washington, implying that Madison served as the first President of the United States instead of Washington in Paladin's universe.

== Publication ==
"The Reploids" was published in the 1988 book Night Visions 5. The following year, Night Visions 5 was reprinted as Dark Visions. It was reprinted again in 1990, this time as The Skin Trade. The story was reprinted in the British magazine Skeleton Crew in July 1990. "The Reploids" was originally envisaged by King as part of a novel, but was never developed further.

== Reception ==
Rocky Wood describes "The Reploids" as "one of King's least satisfying short stories, mostly due to an unsatisfactory and inconclusive ending." James Van Hise states that the story "reads like the first half of a story or the first chapter of a novel", describing it as "not very well developed".

== Relationship with other works ==
Aberrant United States currency — changes in color and presidents — is also described by Father Callahan in the chapter "The Priest's Tale Continued (Highways in Hiding)" from The Dark Tower V: Wolves of the Calla (DT5). In DT5, such differing bills are explained as originating from different co-existing universes within the Dark Tower multiverse. President Chadbourne is mentioned in both the short story and the novel.

This can also be a reference to the multiverses seen in the novella Ur, where there have been different historical events for different timelines.

== See also ==
- Stephen King short fiction bibliography
