= The Doctor's Case =

- Short story by Stephen King
- Country: United States
- Language: English
- Genre: Mystery

Publication
- Published in: The New Adventures of Sherlock Holmes (1st release); Nightmares & Dreamscapes
- Publication type: Anthology
- Media type: Print (Paperback)
- Publication date: 1987

"The Doctor's Case" is a short story by American author Stephen King, originally published in The New Adventures of Sherlock Holmes, a 1987 centennial collection, and reprinted in his collection Nightmares & Dreamscapes.

This story is King's foray into Sherlockiana, a non-canonical Sherlock Holmes story, using Arthur Conan Doyle's characters. Like his story "Crouch End", inspired by H. P. Lovecraft's Cthulhu Mythos, "The Doctor's Case" is an example of a pastiche.

== Plot summary ==
Dr. Watson narrates a heretofore unreleased case in which he and Holmes are called by Inspector Lestrade on an unexpectedly rainy day to investigate the murder of the sadistic Lord Hull. Each member of Hull's family - his wife and three sons - has reason to murder him; his wife and bowlegged son suffered from constant abuse, while another son was doomed to never receive more than a pittance due to his placement in the family line. Furthermore, while Hull's family had endured his treatment in the hopes that he would leave his considerable wealth to them, they had recently learned that Hull had rewritten his will so that none of them received a thing. Despite these motives, the family have effectively given each other alibis and the murder itself is effectively a locked room mystery; there is no place in Hull's study for anyone to hide without being seen, and all the doors and windows were locked by the lord himself.

Holmes is eager to solve this mystery but is allergic to Hull's numerous cats. Watson, however, notices that a certain table in the locked study casts odd shadows on the rug. When he goes to check the table, he discovers an illusion and demonstrates that the table has been rigged. The bookshelf's lowest shelf is, in fact, a photorealistic painting. The murderer, Hull's artist son Jory, had perfectly rendered the bottom shelf, then pasted the results against the back table-legs. When his father announced the new will, Jory entered the study, crouched behind the table, and sprang out to stab his father at an opportune moment. A cursory glance would not betray the illusion on an overcast day, but on a sunny one, the lack of shadows cast by the table-legs would have been noticeable. To help make the illusion perfect, Jory had prepared shadows out of black felt and laid them down at roughly the place where shadows should be. Unfortunately, he was "caught by shadows on a day when there should be none". Furthermore, Hull had time to scream before he died, arousing the attention of his servants and making it impossible for Jory to either collect his paintings or frame the murder as a break-in gone wrong. Instead, Jory stole and burnt the new will, guaranteeing that he and his family would receive their inheritance.

As Watson explains his insights, he slowly comes to the realization that Jory could not have executed the murder on his own and that, at the very least, everyone in the family knew of it and was lying for him. Holmes, who had already reached that conclusion while listening to Watson's narrative, gently chides him for his inability to understand the depths of human depravity. Watson also realizes that Holmes had understood everything not long from the beginning of Watson's story, yet deliberately kept his silence, letting Watson have his moment in the sun; rather than resenting his thunder being stolen, Holmes was genuinely impressed with the "deductive light" Watson demonstrated.

Holmes and Lestrade discuss the various sentences that the Hulls will receive if the case is brought before court; Jory is guaranteed an execution, whilst the other two sons would be jailed for life and the wife jailed for some time in a women's prison. They eventually decide that the world is, perhaps, better off without Hull in it and thus conspire to conceal the truth of what has occurred. Holmes and Watson collect the painting and the shadows, while Lestrade unlocks one of the windows in the room; they leave and inform the waiting police that Hull was murdered in an attempted break-in.

== Adaptations ==
An independent Canadian film adaptation of The Doctor's Case was produced in mid-2018, adapted and directed by James Douglas. Michael Coleman played Watson, whilst J.P. Winslow was cast as Holmes. The X-Files star William B. Davis played an older Watson.

In February 2023, a new short film adaptation was announced, from Mena Massoud's production company Press Play Productions. The film, entitled The Last King, will be performed in the Farsi language, the first King adaptation to do so, and will include cast predominantly consisting of Iranian-American/Iranian-Canadian actors. Dadyar Vakili will portray Vahid, the Watson character, whilst Maz Jobrani will play Shahriar, the Holmes substitute. The cast will also feature Shiva Negar, Shila Ommi, Marshall Manesh, Peter Banifaz, Tara Grammy, Nazanin Nour, Gillian Fortin and Tehran Von Ghasri.

The audiobook of this story is read by actor Tim Curry.

== See also ==
- Stephen King short fiction bibliography
