= Head Down =

Head Down may refer to:

- "Head Down" (essay), a 1990 non-fiction essay by Stephen King
- Head Down, Hampshire, England
- Head Down (Moev album), a 1990 album by Moev
- Head Down (Rival Sons album), a 2012 album by Rival Sons
- Head down, a position in skydiving; see freeflying
- "Head Down", a song by Nine Inch Nails, from the album The Slip
- "Head Down", a song by Soundgarden, from the album Superunknown

== See also ==
- Head-down display, as opposed to a heads-up display
