= My Pretty Pony =

1988 short story by Stephen King

- Oversized slip-cased edition cover
- Author: Stephen King
- Illustrator: Barbara Kruger
- Cover artist: Barbara Kruger
- Language: English
- Genre: Parable short story
- Publisher: Alfred A. Knopf
- Publication date: December 1988
- Publication place: United States
- Media type: Print (Paperback)
- Pages: 100 pp
- ISBN: 978-0-394-58037-1

"My Pretty Pony" is a short story written by Stephen King and illustrated by the artist Barbara Kruger. It was the sixth publication in the Whitney Museum of American Art artist and writer series. An original limited coffee table book edition of 250 was published in 1988 and was an oversized fine press slip-cased book with stainless steel faced boards and digital clock inset into the front cover. A trade edition of 15,000 was later published by Alfred A. Knopf in 1989. In 1993, the story was included in King's collection Nightmares & Dreamscapes.

== Plot summary ==
An elderly man, his death rapidly approaching, takes his young grandson up onto a hill behind his house and gives the boy his pocket watch. Then, standing among falling apple blossoms, the man also "gives instruction" on the nature of time: how when you grow up, it begins to move faster and faster, slipping away from you in great chunks if you don't hold tightly onto it. Time is a pretty pony, with a wicked heart.

== Background ==
In his note on the story in Nightmares and Dreamscapes, King says the piece was originally a flashback scene included in a full-length novel-in-progress in which the grandson was now a brutal hitman reflecting on his childhood. The novel was intended to be published under King's Richard Bachman pseudonym, but the author grew disenchanted with the work, and finally scrapped it entirely.

King references this concept again in the "Sorry, Right Number" screenplay (also collected in Nightmares and Dreamscapes), where a direction states that a character's "pretty pony has done its fair share of running" (indicating that they have aged relatively rapidly).

== Adaptations ==
My Pretty Pony (2009) is also a Dollar Baby short film, based on the Stephen King short story, directed by Mikhail Tank and starring Paul Marin (HD/SAG/4.4 minutes).

In May 2017, Saw star Tobin Bell was set to star in a short film based on the short story, directed by Luke Jaden and produced by Phil Wurtzel of Friel Films and Josh Boone.

The audiobook of this short story is read by musician Jerry Garcia of the Grateful Dead.

== See also ==
- Stephen King short fiction bibliography
