= The Addams Family (1991 film) =

1991 film by Barry Sonnenfeld

- Theatrical release poster by Mick McGinty
- Directed by: Barry Sonnenfeld
- Written by: Caroline Thompson; Larry Wilson
- Based on: Characters by Charles Addams
- Produced by: Scott Rudin
- Starring: Anjelica Huston; Raul Julia; Christopher Lloyd
- Cinematography: Owen Roizman
- Edited by: Dede Allen; Jim Miller
- Music by: Marc Shaiman
- Production company: Scott Rudin Productions
- Distributed by: Paramount Pictures (North America); Orion Pictures International (through Columbia Tri-Star Films; international)
- Release date: November 22, 1991
- Running time: 100 minutes
- Country: United States
- Language: English
- Budget: $30 million
- Box office: $191.5 million

The Addams Family is a 1991 American supernatural black comedy film based on the comic strip characters created by Charles Addams. Directed by former cinematographer Barry Sonnenfeld in his feature directorial debut, the film stars Anjelica Huston as Morticia Addams, Raul Julia as Gomez Addams, and Christopher Lloyd as Fester Addams. The film focuses on a bizarre, macabre, aristocratic family who reconnect with someone whom they believe to be a long-lost relative, Gomez's brother Fester Addams.

The film was noted for its turbulent production. Originally developed at Orion Pictures, the film went $5 million over budget due to constant rewrites throughout shooting; health problems of people involved in the filming; and an overall stressful filming for Sonnenfeld himself, which caused multiple delays. The rise in production costs led Orion, financially struggling and fearful of another big-budget flop, to sell the film to Paramount Pictures, who completed it and handled domestic distribution. Orion Pictures International distributed the film internationally through Columbia Tri-Star Films.

The Addams Family was theatrically released on November 22, 1991. It received mixed to positive reviews, with praise for the cast and humor but criticism for the plot. Huston was nominated for a Golden Globe Award for Best Actress – Comedy or Musical for her performance. The film was commercially successful, earning $191 million and becoming the eighth-highest grossing film of 1991. A sequel, Addams Family Values, was released in 1993.

== Plot ==
Gomez Addams laments the 25-year absence of his brother Fester, who disappeared after the two had a falling-out. Gomez's lawyer Tully Alford owes money to loan shark Abigail Craven, and notices that her adopted son Gordon closely resembles Fester. He proposes that Gordon pose as Fester to infiltrate the Addams household and find the hidden vault where they keep their vast riches.

Tully and his wife Margaret attend a séance at the Addams home led by Grandmama in which the family tries to contact Fester's spirit. Gordon arrives, posing as Fester, while Abigail poses as the German psychiatrist Dr. Greta Pinder-Schloss. She tells the family that Fester had been lost in the Bermuda Triangle for the past 25 years until she found him in some tuna nets. Gomez, overjoyed to have "Fester" back, takes him to the family vault to view home movies from their childhood. Gordon learns that Gomez was jealous of Fester's success with women, and wooed the conjoined twins Flora and Fauna Amor away from him out of envy, resulting in their dispute.

Gomez starts to suspect that "Fester" is an impostor when he is unable to recall important details about their past. Gordon attempts to return to the vault, but is unable to get past a booby trap. Gomez's wife Morticia reminds "Fester" of the importance of family among the Addamses and of their vengeance against those who cross them. Fearing that the family is getting wise to their con, Abigail convinces Gomez that his suspicions are due to displacement.

Gordon, under the guise of Fester, grows closer to the Addams family, particularly the children Wednesday and Pugsley, whom he helps to prepare a swordplay sequence for a school play. Abigail had insisted that Gordon not attend the play, but after feeling deeply saddened by this, he attends anyway. After the play, "Dr. Pinder-Schloss" insists that "Fester" must once again leave, so the Addamses throw a large party with their extended family and friends, during which Abigail plans to break into the vault. Wednesday overhears Gordon and Abigail discussing the plan, and escapes them by hiding in the family cemetery.

Tully learns that as the elder brother, Fester is the executor of the Addams estate and therefore technically owns the entire property. With help from the Addamses' neighbor Judge George Womack, whom Gomez has repeatedly infuriated by hitting golf balls into his house, Tully procures a restraining order against the family, banning them from the estate. Gomez attempts to fight the order in court, but Judge Womack rules against him out of spite.

While Abigail, Gordon, and Tully try repeatedly and unsuccessfully to get past the booby trap blocking access to the vault, the Addamses are forced to move into a motel and find jobs. Morticia tries to be a preschool teacher, Wednesday and Pugsley sell toxic lemonade, and Thing—the family's animated disembodied hand—becomes a courier. Despondent, Gomez sinks into depression and lethargy.

Morticia returns to the Addams home to confront Gordon and is captured by Abigail and Tully, who torture her in an attempt to learn how to access the vault. Thing observes this and informs Gomez, using Morse code. Gomez rushes to Morticia's rescue, and Abigail threatens Morticia's life if Gomez does not surrender the family fortune.

Fed up with Abigail's behavior and constant berating, Gordon turns against her. Using a magical book which projects its contents into reality, he unleashes a hurricane into the house. It strikes his own head with lightning and launches Tully and Abigail out of a window and into open graves dug for them by Wednesday and Pugsley.

Seven months later at Halloween, it emerges that Gordon actually was Fester and really had gone missing in the Bermuda Triangle, where he was found and adopted by Abigail. However, Fester had suffered from amnesia the whole time and only recovered his memories after being struck by the lightning. Meanwhile, Margaret is now in a relationship with Cousin Itt, an Addams family relative. With the family whole again as they play "Wake the Dead", Morticia informs Gomez that she is pregnant.

== Cast ==
- Anjelica Huston as Morticia Addams
- Raul Julia as Gomez Addams
  - Jimmy Ross and Daniel Pikus as a pre-teen and teenage Gomez respectively
- Christopher Lloyd as Uncle Fester Addams / Gordon Craven
  - Ryan Anderson and Michael Hittlesdorf as a pre-teen and teenage Fester respectively
- Christina Ricci as Wednesday Addams
- Jimmy Workman as Pugsley Addams
- Judith Malina as Grandmama
- Carel Struycken as Lurch
- Christopher Hart as Thing
- John Franklin as Cousin Itt
- Maureen Sue Levin and Darlene Levin as Flora and Fauna Amor
- Elizabeth Wilson as Abigail Craven
- Dan Hedaya as Tully Alford
- Dana Ivey as Margaret Alford
- Paul Benedict as Judge George Womack
- Allegra Kent as Cousin Ophelia Frump
- Mercedes McNab as Girl Scout
- Sally Jessy Raphael as Herself
- Barry Sonnenfeld as Train Passenger (uncredited)

== Production ==
=== Pre-production ===
Scott Rudin, a development executive at 20th Century Fox, pitched to the studio an adaptation of Charles Addams' The Addams Family cartoons, and the studio enthusiastically agreed that the cartoons would make a good film, and set out to purchase the rights. Fox did not make the film, as Orion Pictures, who owned the film rights to The Addams Family, would not sell the property, as they were planning on producing a rebooted TV series. Further crucial property rights were owned by Charles Addams' widow Marilyn Matthews Miller.

Another difficulty in getting the film produced was the relative obscurity of the 1964 television series, as compared to the better-known series The Munsters, due to syndication. The production moved forward when Miller sold the remaining rights to Orion, who put the film in production with Rudin producing. Tim Burton and Terry Gilliam were approached to direct the film but both declined.

=== Casting ===
Anjelica Huston said she based aspects of her performance on her friend Jerry Hall to give the character of Morticia Addams more warmth. Huston said she would have expected the role to go to Cher, but was a longtime fan of Morticia. Raul Julia was cast as Gomez Addams; he was attracted to the role because of the character's irreverent portrayal, noting that "even his depressions are wonderful".

=== Writing ===
Caroline Thompson and Larry Wilson wrote the first draft of the screenplay, which was extensively rewritten later by other writers, including Paul Rudnick, who later wrote Addams Family Values.

In a 2012 interview, director Barry Sonnenfeld recalled that he had originally intended that it be unclear whether Fester Addams (Christopher Lloyd) really was an imposter or not, but the actors strongly opposed the notion and selected then 10-year-old Christina Ricci, who played Wednesday Addams, to speak on their behalf. Ricci "gave this really impassioned plea that Fester shouldn't be an imposter... so we ended up totally changing that plot point to make the actors happy. And they were right – it was the better way to go".

=== Special effects ===
Makeup and animatronic effects for the film were handled by Tony Gardner and his company Alterian, Inc.

=== Filming ===
Principal photography began on November 26, 1990. After Tim Burton passed on directing the film because he was busy filming Batman Returns, the sequel to the 1989 film Batman, at the time, Barry Sonnenfeld took the job. According to Sonnenfeld, Terry Gilliam was also offered to direct the film, which he turned down. His first directing job after previously serving as director of photography for several major films, Sonnenfeld experienced much stress during filming. Most of the film was shot on Stage 3/8 at the Hollywood Center Studios in Los Angeles, the same studio where the original TV series was filmed.

In the last three months of production, director of photography Owen Roizman quit, and was replaced by Gale Tattersall. Filming resumed, but within weeks Tattersall was rushed to the hospital, halting production while Sonnenfeld took over cinematography, while simultaneously directing the film. Further delays occurred when a blood vessel in actor Raul Julia's eye burst, leading the production to film around Julia until he recovered, and Sonnenfeld's wife Susan Ringo became sick, halting production.

In her 2014 memoir Watch Me, Anjelica Huston described the filming of The Addams Family as "long and arduous". It was decided that the character of Morticia should have eyes which slanted upwards at the sides, an effect which was achieved by attaching an elastic strap to the back of Huston's head, via fabric tabs glued at her temples, which pulled the corners of her eyes upwards. A second strap was added to balance the appearance of the lower part of her face with the upper. The bands caused extended discomfort to Huston, and, unless she removed them at lunchtime, she would suffer severe headaches and rashes later in the day.

Removing the bands for a break entailed hours of extra work in both removing and then re-applying her makeup and wig. On top of this, the bands would snap at the slightest turn of Huston's head, causing yet more grueling repair time. Eventually, she learned to pivot and turn on her feet without moving her upper body or head. According to Huston, actress Judith Malina's way of enduring being "embedded in latex for over twelve hours a day" was to "smoke an endless series of joints in her trailer throughout filming".

Another production difficulty was the financial decline of original production studio Orion Pictures, which, while having recently made the big hits The Silence of the Lambs and Dances with Wolves, had also produced several major flops which ate up the studios' funds, leading Orion to sell The Addams Family, while still in production, to Paramount Pictures. In exchange, Paramount would own the domestic rights, as Orion had pre-sold the international rights to Columbia. Part of Orion's motivation to sell the film was that the film, originally budgeted at $25 million, had gone $5 million over budget due to newly added material as a result of the film's numerous rewrites. With the projected release date competing with Steven Spielberg's Hook, Orion feared that The Addams Family would be another expensive flop, and decided to cut its losses. Ultimately, The Addams Family was a box-office hit. As the sale occurred late in production, the filmmakers were unaware that Paramount had taken over production, learning of the sale from a journalist rather than either of the studios.

=== Post-production ===
The film was further shaped by test screenings. The Mamushka sequence, a musical dance number, was significantly longer in the original cut, but was shortened following negative responses from test audiences.

== Music ==
The Addams Family: Soundtrack

Soundtrack album by various artists
- Released: December 3, 1991
- Genre: Soundtrack
- Length: 41:17
- Label: Capitol Records
- Producers: Hummie Mann; Marc Shaiman

Singles from The Addams Family Soundtrack
- 1. "Addams Groove" Released: December 17, 1991

The Addams Family: Soundtrack was produced by Hummie Mann and Marc Shaiman. It was orchestrated by Hummie Mann and composed by Marc Shaiman and Saxie Dowell. It was released on December 3, 1991 by Capitol Records. "Addams Groove" by MC Hammer was the theme song for the movie and the music video was played prior to the film.

Professional ratings
Review scores
Source	Rating
Soundtrack.net	4.5/5 stars

== Release ==
The Addams Family grossed $113,502,426 in the United States and Canada and $191,502,426 worldwide, turning a significant profit against the $30 million production costs. It opened at number one in the US above Cape Fear, Beauty and the Beast and An American Tail: Fievel Goes West with an opening weekend gross of $24,203,754, Paramount's biggest opening non-holiday weekend gross, surpassing the record set by Another 48 Hours.

== Home media ==
Ownership issues surrounding the film, with domestic rights being handled by Paramount and international rights held by Orion's successor-in-interest Metro-Goldwyn-Mayer, kept the film out of print overseas after its initial VHS release, which were not resolved until 2013. In 1993, McDonald's sold low-cost, exclusive VHS editions of The Addams Family and Wayne's World to coincide with the theatrical releases of Addams Family Values and Wayne's World 2, as part of an exclusive distribution deal with Paramount Home Entertainment.

In 2000, Paramount Home Entertainment released the film on DVD. This release contained only two trailers as bonus features. In 2006, the film was reissued in a double feature with Addams Family Values. In September 2014, Warner Home Video released the film on Blu-ray in the United States. Warner Bros. Home Entertainment, under license from MGM Home Entertainment, also released the film on Blu-ray internationally. In October 2019, Paramount Pictures released a double-feature Blu-ray of The Addams Family and Addams Family Values, along with single releases of each film. In November 2021, the film was re-released on Blu-ray & Ultra HD Blu-ray with an extended version of the Mamushka sequence.

== Reception ==
On review aggregation website Rotten Tomatoes, The Addams Family has an approval rating of 67% based on 54 reviews. The website's critical consensus reads: "The movie is peppered with amusing sight gags and one-liners, but the disjointed script doesn't cohere into a successful whole". On Metacritic, the film has a weighted average score of 57 out of 100 based on 19 critics, indicating "mixed or average reviews". Audiences polled by CinemaScore gave the film an average grade of "B" on an A+ to F scale.

Roger Ebert gave the film 2 out of 4 stars, saying it was mildly entertaining but did not add up to much. Jonathan Rosenbaum of the Chicago Reader called the film a "collection of one-liners and not much more". Variety magazine wrote: "Despite inspired casting and nifty visual trappings, the eagerly awaited Addams Family figures a major disappointment". According to the BBC, "it is the top-notch cast that elevates this film from flimsy to sheer delight".

=== Accolades ===
The Addams Family was awarded Best Horror Film of the Year in 1991 by the Horror Hall of Fame. Carel Struycken appeared at the award ceremony to receive the award on behalf of the cast. Huston was nominated for the Golden Globe Award for Best Actress – Motion Picture Musical or Comedy for her performance as Morticia at the 49th Golden Globes. Ruth Myers was nominated for an Academy Award for Best Costume Design, but lost to Albert Wolsky for Bugsy at the 64th Academy Awards. The film won a Golden Raspberry Award for Worst Original Song for the song "Addams Groove" by MC Hammer at the 12th Golden Raspberry Awards. The film also won the Kids' Choice Award for Favorite Movie at 1992 Kids' Choice Awards.

== Other media ==
=== Documentary ===
A documentary, The Making of The Addams Family, was produced to promote the film in 1991.

=== Video game ===
Several video games based on the film were released for various console, handheld, and home computer platforms.

=== Pinball ===
The Addams Family was a commercial arcade pinball machine made by Bally/Williams and was released in March 1992. It became the best selling pinball machine of all time, with more than 20,000 units sold. The pinball was digitally re-released on The Pinball Arcade in February 2015 until June 2018.

== Lawsuit ==
Another obstacle in releasing the film occurred when, as the studios prepared the film for release, David Levy, a producer of the original 1960s TV series, filed a lawsuit against Paramount Pictures, claiming that the film infringed on his property rights. The suit was eventually settled out of court, after the film's release, due to Paramount greenlighting a sequel after the first film's success.
