= Popsy (short story) =

- Short story by Stephen King
- Country: United States
- Language: English
- Genre: Horror

Publication
- Published in: Masques II: All-New Stories of Horror and the Supernatural
- Publication type: Anthology
- Publisher: Maclay & Associates
- Media type: Print (Paperback)
- Publication date: 1987

"Popsy" is a horror short story by American writer Stephen King. It was first published in 1987 in Masques II: All-New Stories of Horror and the Supernatural, a horror anthology edited by J. N. Williamson. In 1993, it was collected in King's short story compilation Nightmares & Dreamscapes.

== Plot summary ==
Briggs Sheridan, a gambling addict, has taken to abducting children for a Turkish man known as "Mr. Wizard" in order to pay off his debt of $35,000 (equivalent to $78,000 in 2025) to Mr. Reggie, a mobster who has threatened Sheridan with grievous bodily harm; Mr. Wizard has told Sheridan only that the children go "on a boat ride" (implicitly for human trafficking overseas), and Sheridan wants no further information. While lurking in the Cousintown Mall parking lot in his modified van, Sheridan spots his newest probable target of opportunity - a pallid child standing near the entrance, obviously separated from his parents and distressed. Sheridan approaches him, convincing him that he has seen the child's grandfather, or "Popsy" (as the boy calls him).

Continuing his standard procedure for the kidnappings, Sheridan lures the boy into his van, handcuffs him and drives off to make his delivery. On his way to the drop-off point, the boy shows unusual strength, biting Sheridan hard enough to leave two deep marks on his hand, as well as nearly ripping out the steel bar he is handcuffed to. In addition to these demonstrations of strength, the boy makes odd comments about his Popsy, such as his ability to find him and to fly. By the time they are nearing their destination, night has fallen, and Sheridan sees an odd shape swoop by overhead. The boy claims this is Popsy, and although Sheridan does not immediately believe it, he becomes nervous. Moments later, a wing covers the windshield and the door is ripped off, revealing a frightening and horrific bat-like creature which slits Sheridan's throat and feeds his blood to the child.

== Relation to other works ==
King states, as written in the notes section of Nightmares and Dreamscapes, that the Popsy of the title could be the very same air pilot vampire from "The Night Flier", another short story in the same collection.

== Reception ==
Janet C. Beaulieu of the Bangor Daily News called the story "simply wonderful". Cedric Cullingford compares the story to the Point Horror adolescent horror novels and questions whether the ending is supposed to be happy, given that a child abductor is killed.

== Adaptations ==
The audiobook version of this story was narrated by actor Joe Mantegna.

A short film adaptation was directed by Canadian filmmaker Jon Mann in 2019.

== See also ==
- Stephen King short fiction bibliography
