= Inertia (short story) =

- Short story by Nancy Kress
- Country: United States
- Language: English
- Genre(s): science fiction

Publication
- Published in: Analog Science Fiction and Fact
- Media type: Print
- Publication date: January 1990

"Inertia" is a science fiction short story written by Nancy Kress. It was first published in Analog Science Fiction and Fact, in January 1990, and was subsequently republished in The Year's Best Science Fiction: Eighth Annual Collection (1991), in Best New SF 5 (1991), in The Aliens of Earth (1993), in A Woman's Liberation: A Choice of Futures by and About Women (2001), and in Wastelands: Stories of the Apocalypse (2008). It describes life in a "disease colony"; Kress has stated that the story was inspired directly by cultural reactions to the AIDS pandemic, and that it is "less about disease than about love."

== Synopsis ==
An incurable and highly contagious disease causes disfiguring "skin rope" tumors and flattened affect; consequently, all its sufferers are stripped of their rights and forced into sealed quarantine camps. Sixty years later, Dr McHabe visits a camp and reveals to the detainees that he has an illegal cure for the disease's physical symptoms — and that its psychiatric symptoms have kept the camps from descending into violent anarchy like the rest of the world.

== Reception ==
At SF Signal, John Nardo considered "Inertia" to be "everything short fiction could and should be: thought-provoking, based on a cool sf-nal idea and wholly entertaining," declaring it to be "simultaneously grim and deep and wonderful", and awarding it five stars out of five.

In the New York Review of Science Fiction, Leonard Rysdyk stated that Inertia was "as well-written as any “literary” mood piece from the New Yorker or the Saturday Evening Post", emphasizing that it was "rich in detail and character" and that its basic idea was "engrossing"; however, he also cited its ambiguity, the "logical problems" with the execution of the quarantine, and his dissatisfaction with its overall theme, concluding that it is "less than the sum of its parts."
