= The Fifth Quarter (short story) =

- Short story by Stephen King (as John Swithen)
- Country: United States
- Language: English
- Genre: Short story

Publication
- Published in: Cavalier (1st release), Nightmares & Dreamscapes
- Publication type: Magazine
- Publisher: DuGent Publishing Corp
- Media type: Print (Paperback)

"The Fifth Quarter" is a short story by American author Stephen King, originally published in the April 1972 issue of Cavalier (under the pen name John Swithen) and later collected in King's 1993 collection Nightmares & Dreamscapes. It was filmed as an episode of the TNT miniseries Nightmares & Dreamscapes: From the Stories of Stephen King.

In the notes for this story, King remarks "Bachman again or maybe George Stark", a reference to his pseudonym Richard Bachman whose "relationship" with him was the basis of the character George Stark for the novel The Dark Half. It is the only work of short fiction that King ever wrote under a pen name.

== Plot summary ==
The story follows an unnamed narrator who calls himself Jerry Tarkanian. He is a criminal looking to avenge the death of his friend Barney, who died at the hands of his own accomplices after taking part in an armored car heist. Unknown to them, Barney managed to get to Tarkanian before he died and told him of the heist and of a map divided amongst his killers that reveals the location of the stolen money.

At the start of the story, Tarkanian has tracked down two of the men involved, Keenan and Sarge, who are meeting to discuss a deal between themselves. He manages to hold them at gunpoint and forces Keenan to give him his piece of the map before shooting him dead after learning he was the one who fatally wounded Barney. He then returns with Sarge to Sarge's shack, where his piece of the map is located. However, immediately after Sarge gives Tarkanian his piece of the map, the other man involved in the heist, Jagger, appears and attacks them both. In the firefight that follows, Sarge is killed but contributes to Jagger's downfall when his body obstructs Jagger's path; this gives Tarkanian the advantage necessary to kill Jagger.

Despite not having Jagger's part of the map, Tarkanian knows enough to recover the money. The story ends as Tarkanian leaves the scene. Tarkanian knows that his debt to his friend has been paid and he himself now has a lot to be grateful for.

== TV adaptation ==
In the TNT miniseries, the story evolves slightly differently. Barney manages to tell Willie (Jeremy Sisto) about the heist and the four map segments, giving Willie his segment before his death. Willie proceeds to story, trips Jagger. After Willie was picked up by the police, his wife Lisa is left with the map. After some troubles, she succeeds at "decoding" the mysterious map and recovers the money.

Bryan Pope of DVD Verdict rated the episode A− and called it "intimate and compelling." Christopher Noseck of DVD Talk said it is "excellently paced and very well acted." Jon Condit of Dread Central rated the episode 3/5 stars and criticized the ending as ridiculous.

The audiobook of this story is read by actor Gary Sinise.

== See also ==
- Stephen King short fiction bibliography
