= Nightmares & Dreamscapes: From the Stories of Stephen King =

2006 American anthology television series

- Created by: Stephen King
- Starring: Various
- Composer: Jeff Beal
- Country of origin: United States
- No. of episodes: 8

Production
- Running time: 378 minutes
- Production company: Coote/Hayes Productions

Original release
- Network: TNT
- Release: July 12 – August 2, 2006

Nightmares & Dreamscapes: From the Stories of Stephen King is an American horror anthology television series that aired on TNT, based on short stories written by American author Stephen King. It debuted on July 12, 2006, and ended its run on August 2, 2006. Although most of the stories are from the book collection of the same title, some are from different collections by King. A trailer confirming a DVD edition of the series was released in October 2006. The series was filmed entirely in Melbourne, Australia.

== Production ==
Episodes based on stories from the Nightmares & Dreamscapes collection are "Umney's Last Case", "You Know They Got a Hell of a Band", "The End of the Whole Mess", "The Fifth Quarter" and "Crouch End". "The Road Virus Heads North" and "Autopsy Room Four" are adaptations of stories from Everything's Eventual (2002), and "Battleground" is from Night Shift (1978).

The special effects for the series were provided by Jim Henson's Creature Shop.

== Cast ==
- Tom Berenger as Richard Kinnell
- William H. Macy as Clyde Umney /Sam Landry / George Demmick
- Kim Delaney as Mary Rivingham
- Steven Weber as Clark Rivingham
- Ron Livingston as Howard Fornoy
- Henry Thomas as Robert Fornoy
- Rebecca Gibney as India Fornoy
- William Hurt as Jason Renshaw
- Samantha Mathis as Karen Evans
- Jacinta Stapleton as Cece Pryor
- Jeremy Sisto as Willie Evans
- Sigrid Thornton as Mrs. Angus Sternwood
- Peter O’Brien as Keenan
- Jacqueline McKenzie as Linda Landry / Gloria Demmick
- Claire Forlani as Doris Frehman
- Eion Bailey as Lonnie Frehman
- Richard Thomas as Howard Cottrell
- Rhondda Findleton as Sarah Joyce
- Kodi Smit-McPhee as Jackson Evans / Brandon
- Greta Scacchi as Dr Katie Arlen
- Chris Haywood as Dr Bogner
- Martin Vaughan as Dr Kazallan
- Tyler Coppin as Richard Fornoy
- Kym Gyngell as Will Tabor
- Bert La Bonté as Otis Redding
- Marsha Mason as Aunt Trudy
- Susie Porter as Sally Blair Kinnell
- Christopher Kirby as Sarge
- Bruce Spence as Hans Morris
- Kristian Schmid as Buddy Holly
- Robert Mammone as Peter Jennings / Jagger
- Harold Hopkins as Vernon Klein
- Peter Curtin as Mr Woolrich
- Fletcher Humphrys as Duane Allman
- André de Vanny as Skater Boy
- Krista Vendy as Front Desk Clerk
- Mia Sara as Beautiful Passenger
- Greg Stone as CNN Anchor
- Sara Zwangobani as News Anchor
- John Orcsik as Stan, The Cop
- Tory Mussett as Girlfriend of Private Detective
- Mark Mitchell as 'Blondie'
- Monica Maughan as Woman In Street
- Ron Haddrick as Man In Lift
- Nicholas Bell as Health Official
- Steve Mouzakis as Driver
- Bill Barretta as Savage Commando (uncredited)

== Episodes ==
| No. | Title | Directed by | Original release date |
|---|---|---|---|
| 1 | "Battleground" | Brian Henson | July 12, 2006 |
A professional hitman (William Hurt) receives a package of sinister toy soldiers after killing the CEO of a toy company. Teleplay by Richard Christian Matheson.
| 2 | "Crouch End" | Mark Haber | July 12, 2006 |
A newlywed couple (Claire Forlani, Eion Bailey) goes honeymooning in London only to get lost in Crouch End, a notorious town that may be a portal to another dimension.
| 3 | "Umney's Last Case" | Rob Bowman | July 19, 2006 |
After the death of his son, a writer (William H. Macy) writes himself into the story and forces his lead character, a hardboiled detective from the 1930s (also played by Macy), to switch places with him.
| 4 | "The End of the Whole Mess" | Mikael Salomon | July 19, 2006 |
In his last moments, a renowned filmmaker (Ron Livingston) recalls an experiment by his genius brother (Henry Thomas) to end world violence—but at a horrible cost.
| 5 | "The Road Virus Heads North" | Sergio Mimica-Gezzan | July 26, 2006 |
A famous horror writer (Tom Berenger) buys a gruesome painting for inspiration, only to find the painting starts changing and corresponding with sinister events in real life.
| 6 | "The Fifth Quarter" | Rob Bowman | July 26, 2006 |
A released convict (Jeremy Sisto) goes on a treasure hunt for stolen money, risking his family and freedom in the process.
| 7 | "Autopsy Room Four" | Mikael Salomon | August 2, 2006 |
Bitten by a venomous snake, a man (Richard Thomas) falls into a catatonic state, is assumed dead and becomes witness to his own autopsy.
| 8 | "You Know They Got a Hell of a Band" | Mike Robe | August 2, 2006 |
A couple (Kim Delaney & Steven Weber) ignore the advice of the mysterious CeCe (Jacinta Stapleton) and get lost in a strange place called "Rock & Roll Heaven", where ghosts of rock & roll legends roam.

== Home media ==
The complete series was released on DVD on October 26, 2006.
