= Umney's Last Case =

- Short story by Stephen King
- Cover of the separate publication (1995)
- Country: United States
- Language: English
- Genres: Mystery, science fiction short story

Publication
- Published in: Nightmares & Dreamscapes
- Publication type: Collection
- Publisher: Viking
- Media type: Print (Hardcover)
- Publication date: 1993

"Umney's Last Case" is a short story by American author Stephen King, first published in King's collection Nightmares & Dreamscapes (1993). In July 1995, it was published as a separate paperback as part of Penguin's 60th anniversary.

Umney's Last Case is an example of metalepsis in narratology.

== Background information ==
Prior to the story's original appearance in the Nightmares & Dreamscapes collection, Viking Press made the text available online three weeks prior to the book's publication in September 1993 via OBS (The Online Bookstore) for $5.

== Plot summary ==
The story begins as a Raymond Chandler pastiche, and follows a private investigator named Clyde Umney as he goes about what he thinks is just another morning in 1930s Los Angeles. He soon discovers that his life as he knows it is falling apart. All of his lifelong friends and associates are abruptly departing in one fashion or other, for reasons ranging from winning the lottery to terminal cancer, and many of them express disdain towards Umney in place of farewells.

Umney is brooding alone in his office when he receives his final client: Landry, the crime-fiction author who created him. Having suffered the loss of his wife and child as well as a severe case of shingles, Landry took an overdose of medication and found himself in the world of his creation. He demonstrates that his will is law in this world, and explains to a helpless Umney that he intends to take Umney's place to live a life of eternal adventure and excitement. Umney is cast into oblivion—or so it seems.

Umney finds himself in the year 1994, occupying the vacated body of his creator. Although he realizes/acknowledges that his previous existence was a sham (and falling apart), he also finds himself equally despising the ugly, bland, and generally inadequate nature of the "real" world. He announces that he has begun to practice the craft of writing so that he might return to his fictional home in order to take back his world and his life, and end Landry's.

== Adaptations ==
"Umney's Last Case" was included as the third installment of TNT's Nightmares & Dreamscapes: From the Stories of Stephen King, starring William H. Macy in a dual role as both Umney and the author. It originally aired on July 19, 2006. Macy was nominated for an Emmy for his performance.

Jon Condit of DreadCentral rated the episode two out of five stars. Condit said that the episode deviates too highly from King's original story, and the changes only make the story worse. Brian Pope of DVD Verdict rated it a B+ and said that Macy's performance was worthy of an Emmy. Christopher Noseck of DVD Talk said that the episode is "not completely satisfying" but is the best of the episodes on that disc. Virginia Heffernan of The New York Times called it "a gonzo noir special with some postmodern curlicues" that emphasizes class issues common to King's work.

The audiobook of this story is read by crime novelist Robert B. Parker, creator of the detective characters Spenser and Jesse Stone.

== See also ==
- Stephen King short fiction bibliography
