= Night Visions (book series) =

American anthology of horror stories, published from 1984 to 1991

Night Visions is an American series of horror fiction anthologies published 1984–1991 by Dark Harvest of Arlington Heights, Illinois, United States. The science fiction bibliographer and scholar Neil Barron wrote that Night Visions is an important series insofar as many of the stories it published represented some of the best short fiction produced by its writers, and that "it is a cornerstone of any modern horror library."

- Night Visions 1 Alan Ryan 1984
- Night Visions 2 Charles L. Grant 1985
- Night Visions 3 George R. R. Martin
- Night Visions 4 by Paul Mikol, Anon.
- Night Visions 5 Paul J. Mikol, republished as Dark Visions with three short stories by Stephen King, three by Dan Simmons, and one by George R. R. Martin.
- Night Visions 6 by Paul J. Mikol
- Night Visions VII Stanley Wiater
- Night Visions 8 ed. Anon., Arlington Heights, IL: Dark Harvest, 1991
- Night Visions 9 ed. Anon., Arlington Heights, IL: Dark Harvest, 1991
- Night Visions : Dead Image 1987
- Night Visions : In the Blood 1988
