= Christopher Hart (actor) =

Canadian actor and magician (born 1961)

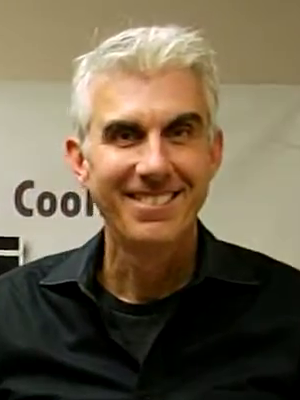
- Hart in 2016
- Born: February 22, 1961 (age 65); Nanaimo, British Columbia, Canada
- Occupations: Actor; magician
- Years active: 1989–present
- Notable work: Thing in The Addams Family films

Christopher Hart (born 22 February 1961) is a Canadian actor and magician whose roles include Thing, the disembodied hand, in the 1991, 1993, and 1998 movies The Addams Family, Addams Family Values, and Addams Family Reunion.

== Early life ==
Christopher Hart was born in Nanaimo, British Columbia, to an English mother and Canadian father. He was raised in Los Angeles, where he was educated in Catholic schools.

At the age of eight he became intrigued after discovering a magic book at the local library. It was at this same time that the television series "The Magician", directed by and starring Bill Bixby, was on the air and further fueled his passion for magic.

== Career ==
At sixteen, after an extensive audition and interview process, Hart was accepted into the Magic Castle's elite junior program. As a teenager, he earned extra money working in a cemetery as a grave digger and was nicknamed Lurch due to his tall, lanky frame. Soon realizing that it was a dead-end job, Hart accepted a position demonstrating tricks at Hollywood Magic, the largest West Coast magic shop.

Working in Hollywood gave Hart the opportunity to meet and perform before the likes of Michael Jackson, Johnny Carson, Muhammad Ali and Harry Anderson. As Hart's reputation grew he soon came to the attention of David Copperfield for whom Hart first worked as a Magic Roadie. Impressed with Hart's knowledge and expertise in the field of magic, Copperfield continued to use him on several more live and television shows, including the Great Wall of China special.

His sleight-of-hand magic has been featured in national television commercials for McDonald's, Honda and RCA. He has twice been awarded "Stage Magician of the Year" by Hollywood's Magic Castle, and Princess Stéphanie of Monaco personally awarded him the top prize at the Grand Prix Magique held in Monte Carlo.

Hart is currently performing in TV's Magic Stars at the Golden Cabaret at the Horizon Casino Resort in Lake Tahoe, Nevada.

Hart appeared on To Tell the Truth in 2018 and on I Can See Your Voice in 2022.

== Filmography ==
Year	Title	Role	Notes
1989	Columbo Goes to the Guillotine	Magician at Cemetery	
1991	Addams Family	Thing	
1993	Addams Family Values	Thing	
1997	Quicksilver Highway	Lefty	TV movie
1998	One Hand, Left		Short
1998	Addams Family Reunion	Thing	TV movie
1999	Idle Hands	The Hand	
1999	Angel	The Hands	Episode: "I Fall to Pieces"
