= Quartet (short story collection) =

First edition, Cover art by Charles Vess

Quartet: Four Tales from the Crossroads is the seventh collection by author George R.R. Martin, first published in February 2001 by NESFA Press. It contains three novellas and a teleplay.

== The Skin Trade ==
The Skin Trade, a horror novella about werewolves, was originally published in 1988 in the Night Visions 5 collection, later retitled as Dark Visions. It won the World Fantasy Award for Best Novella in 1989, and was nominated for a Bram Stoker Award. It was later included in Dreamsongs: A RRetrospective (2003). In September 2013, Avatar Press began publishing a four-issue Skin Trade comic book series, written by Martin and Daniel Abraham, with illustrated color covers and interiors by Mike Wolfer; it was completed in December of that year, followed by a graphic novel collected hardcover volume. In October 2013, WSFA Press published The Skin Trade in both a standard hardcover and a 500-copy signed and numbered limited edition. The Skin Trade has been optioned for film by Ryan Colucci's Spoke Lane Entertainment and Mike the Pike Productions.

== Blood of the Dragon ==
The fantasy novella Blood of the Dragon, comprising the Daenerys Targaryen chapters from Martin's 1996 novel A Game of Thrones, was originally published in the July 1996 issue of Asimov's Science Fiction, and won the 1997 Hugo Award for Best Novella. It was also nominated for the Nebula Award for Best Novella and World Fantasy Award, and came in second in the Locus Poll.

== Black and White and Red All Over ==
A historical novella, Black and White and Red All Over consists of a large fragment of an unfinished novel of the same name, set in the 1890s and based on Jack the Ripper. In 2015, Martin said that he planned to eventually complete it.

== Starport ==
An unproduced science fiction teleplay, Starport was written for Fox Broadcasting Company in 1993.

The TV pilot script was adapted into a graphic novel and illustrated by Hugo Award–nominated artist Raya Golden, published by Random House Publishing Group in March 2019.

== Contents ==
1. Black and White and Red All Over (2001)
2. The Skin Trade (1988)
3. Starport (2001)
4. Blood of the Dragon (1996) - excerpt from A Game of Thrones
