= Quicksilver Highway =

- DVD cover
- Based on: "Chattery Teeth" by Stephen King; "The Body Politic" by Clive Barker
- Screenplay by: Mick Garris
- Directed by: Mick Garris
- Starring: Christopher Lloyd; Matt Frewer; Raphael Sbarge; Missy Crider; Veronica Cartwright
- Music by: Mark Mothersbaugh
- Country of origin: United States
- Original language: English

Production
- Producers: Mick Garris; Ron Mitchell
- Cinematography: Shelly Johnson
- Editor: Norman Hollyn
- Running time: 90 minutes
- Production companies: National Studios; 20th Television
- Budget: $4,000,000 (estimated)

Original release
- Network: Fox Network
- Release: May 13, 1997

Quicksilver Highway is a 1997 made for television horror anthology film directed by Mick Garris. It is based on Clive Barker's 1985 short story "The Body Politic" and Stephen King's 1992 short story "Chattery Teeth". The film was originally shown on the Fox Network on May 13, 1997,before being released on home media.

== Plot ==
Aaron Quicksilver, a travelling showman, tells horror stories to the people he meets. He first runs into Kerry Parker and Olivia Harmon Parker, a newly married couple who are hitchhiking, to whom he tells the story "Chattery Teeth", about Bill Hogan, a man who is saved from dangerous hitchhiker Bryan Adams by a set of wind-up toy teeth. Quicksilver later runs into pickpocket Charlie to whom he tells "The Body Politic", a story about Dr. Charles George, a man whose hands rebel against him.

== Cast ==
- Christopher Lloyd as Aaron Quicksilver
- Matt Frewer as Charlie/Dr. Charles George
- Raphael Sbarge as Kerry Parker/Bill Hogan
- Missy Crider as Olivia Harmon Parker/Lita Hogan
- Silas Weir Mitchell as Bryan Adams
- Bill Nunn as Len
- Veronica Cartwright as Myra
- Bill Bolender as Scooter
- Amelia Heinle as Darlene
- Cynthia Garris as Ellen George
- Kevin Grevioux as Sergeant
- Christopher Hart as Lefty
- William Knight as Rhinoplasty Man
- Shawn Nelson as Driver
- Sherry O'Keefe as Harriet DaVinci
- Clive Barker as Anesthesiologist
- Constance Zimmer as Patient
- Mick Garris as Surgeon
- John Landis as Surgical Assistant

== Production ==
Creative Artists Agency met with Mick Garris about him writing the pilot script for a possible horror television series directed by John McTiernan and produced by his wife Donna Dubrow. The agency suggested multiple ghost stories and urban legends to write about but Garris had another idea. The series would follow mysterious character Aaron Quicksilver who describes himself as "only a storyteller" but is actually much more than that. Each episode would be set in a different location, with the same actors playing different characters. Just after Brandon Tartikoff signed on as producer, Garris pitched the idea to staff at the American Broadcasting Company; the heads of the network weren't interested as they didn't want any horror material in their broadcast schedule but a couple of the network's executives like Greer Shephard got on board. After writing a pilot script based on Stephen King's short story "Chattery Teeth," Garris pitched the series to Fox. However, Fox wanted a two-hour television film. He wrote a screenplay of Clive Barker's "The Body Politic" to serve as the film's second part after "Chattery Teeth." Casting director Lynn Kressel, who previously worked with Garris on The Stand (1994) and The Shining (1997), came up with the idea of Christopher Lloyd as Quicksilver; while the network loved the decision, Garris was a bit skeptical, reasoning that he want a "little more seductive" actor to play the part. In the end, however, Garris loved the decision.

The moment Fox began developing the project, McTiernan left the director's seat on the project, leaving Garris to have to direct the screenplay himself. "The Body Politic" was filmed at the Santa Monica Pier, while "Chattery Teeth" was filmed in Lancaster, California. When playing Dr. Charles George, Matt Frewer had a tough time making the hand move as if it had a separate mind; it took around three days for him to master the trick and by the third day was having "hand nightmares" while resting between shoots. Steve Johnson handled the chattery teeth effects, while Flash Film Works and Bill Mesa was responsible for the moving hands. Around 90% of the hands were digitally animated with LightWave 3D and composed in the shots with the Chyron program Liberty. The more practical hand effects, such as George's left hand, were performed by Christopher Hart, whose work as a magician got him hand-only characters in projects such as three The Addams Family films. The same trick for composing Hart's hand into the shots of Thing in The Addams Family films was used in Quicksilver Highway; Hart wore a rubber prosthetic on the top of his hand and a green sleeve and by using green screening and footage that matched the background of the shots of Hart's hand, his arm was removed. Four days were spent shooting Hart's hand.

== Home media ==
The home media version of Quicksilver Highway switched the orders of the two stories from the television version, where "The Body Politic" comes first and "Chattery Teeth" last. Fox required this change, which Garris disliked as he felt "The Body Politic" was more climactic than "Chattery Teeth."

== See also ==
- List of Stephen King films

== Works cited ==
- Warren, Bill (June 1997). "The Quicksilver Highway to Horror". Fangoria. No. 163. pp. 40–43.
- Warren, Bill (July 1997). "Shining Quicksilver". Fangoria. No. 164. p. 48.
