= Dark Visions =

Horror fiction compilation

- First edition (under original title)
- Author: Stephen King, Dan Simmons, George R. R. Martin
- Original title: Night Visions 5
- Cover artist: Ron Lindahn and Val Lakey Lindahn
- Language: English
- Series: Night Visions
- Genre: Horror, science fiction
- Publisher: Dark Harvest
- Publication date: July 1, 1988
- Publication place: United States
- Media type: Print (hardcover)
- ISBN: 978-0-575-04585-9
- OCLC: 19847729

Dark Visions is a horror fiction compilation, with three short stories by Stephen King, three by Dan Simmons and a novella by George R. R. Martin. It was published by Orion on August 10, 1989. The collection was first published, with the same seven stories, under the title Night Visions 5, by Dark Harvest on July 1, 1988. The book was also issued under the titles Dark Visions and The Skin Trade. The compilation is part of Night Visions, a series of horror fiction anthologies.

Two of the stories by King, "Sneakers" and "Dedication", were later included in his 1993 anthology Nightmares & Dreamscapes.

All three stories by Simmons were later included in his 1990 collection Prayers to Broken Stones.

Martin's The Skin Trade was later included in Quartet: Four Tales from the Crossroads (2001) and Dreamsongs: A RRetrospective (2003).

== Stories ==
=== Stephen King ===
- "The Reploids": Edward Paladin shows up in place of Johnny Carson on the Tonight Show, while Carson is nowhere to be found. A subsequent investigation by detective Richard Cheyney finds strange items in Paladin's possession, hinting that he may not be from our reality: His passes for the studio are the wrong color, and he has a bright blue dollar bill with a picture of James Madison on it.
- "Sneakers": John keeps seeing a pair of old sneakers in the same toilet stall every time he enters the restroom. As time passes, flies build up around the sneakers, but no one else seems to know what is going on or even to notice anything. But he is certain that there is a ghost in the stall.
- "Dedication": A black house maid working in a hotel cleans the room of an eccentric alcoholic writer who is a frequent guest there. The maid consumes some of the writer's semen, left on his sheets, as part of a possible black magic spell in the hope that it will pass talent and ability along to her unborn son.

=== Dan Simmons ===
- "Metastasis": A man suffers a near-death experience in a car crash on the way to visit dying relative. After his crash, he finds he has acquired the ability to see "cancer vampires", hideous creatures which are responsible for the spread of cancer in our world.
- "Vanni Fucci Is Alive and Well and Living in Hell": The godless truth behind Brother Freddy's Hallelujah Breakfast Club.
- "Iverson's Pits": Dealing with horrors from the American Civil War.

=== George R. R. Martin ===
- The Skin Trade: Martin's werewolf novella won the World Fantasy Award for Best Novella in 1989, and was nominated for a Bram Stoker Award. In September 2013, Avatar Press began publishing a four-issue Skin Trade comic book series, written by Martin and Daniel Abraham, with illustrated color covers and interiors by Mike Wolfer; it was completed in December of that year, followed by a graphic novel collected hardcover volume. In October 2013, WSFA Press published The Skin Trade in both a standard hardcover and a 500-copy signed and numbered limited edition. The Skin Trade has been optioned for film and television by Mike the Pike Productions, and on October 11, 2015, Cinemax was set to distribute the television series.
