= You Know They Got a Hell of a Band =

- Short story by Stephen King
- Country: United States
- Language: English
- Genres: Horror, fantasy

Publication
- Published in: Shock Rock (1st release), Nightmares & Dreamscapes
- Publication type: Anthology
- Publisher: Pocket Books
- Media type: Print (Paperback)
- Publication date: 1992

"You Know They Got a Hell of a Band" is a 1992 horror short story by American writer Stephen King. It was first published January 1992 in the horror anthology Shock Rock and later included in King's collection Nightmares & Dreamscapes. It concerns a young couple on a road trip in Oregon when they accidentally wander into a small town inhabited by dead rock and roll legends.

The title of the work, and the name of the town—Rock and Roll Heaven—both come from the chorus of "Rock and Roll Heaven", a song first recorded by Climax in 1973 which became a Top 10 hit by The Righteous Brothers the following year.

== Plot summary ==
Clark and Mary Willingham are a couple traveling through Oregon. Clark is being transferred out of state, so they opt to take a more scenic route. The two plan to visit Toketee Falls, and Clark insists on taking a road through the deep forest despite Mary's fears of becoming lost. While Mary takes a nap, Clark does indeed become increasingly lost on a narrow stretch of road. He is forced to admit to Mary that he's given up hope of finding Toketee Falls and that, furthermore, he had rejected an opportunity to turn around. Frustrated, yet hesitant to push the issue, Mary agrees to press forward in the hopes of reaching a point where they can safely turn around.

The couple abruptly comes upon a sign announcing, "Welcome to Rock and Roll Heaven, Ore." The road becomes wider and paved, giving them another chance to turn around. Again, Clark refuses, arguing that it would be easier and safer to do so inside the town itself. They discover Rock and Roll Heaven is a small town with a 1950s theme, described as looking identical to a Norman Rockwell painting. Mary feels worried about the too-perfect town, but Clark becomes irritated and the two argue, although Mary can sense that he is also alarmed. As the two explore the town, Clark insists on entering a local diner. Afraid of being left alone, she follows.

Inside the diner, Clark and Mary notice two employees resembling dead musicians. After a waitress named Sissy Thomas (CeCe Pryor in the television series adaptation) attempts to warn them off, Clark slips out, and Mary is confronted by the two employees, Janis Joplin and Rick Nelson and two other dead musicians, Buddy Holly and Roy Orbison. At first cordial and friendly, one begins to bleed from his eyes and another vomits hundreds of maggots, revealing that they've simply been playing with her. Clark and Mary drive frantically through the town, chased by dead music legends. As they drive, Mary notices other citizens of Rock and Roll Heaven, all of whom look exhausted and apathetic; she realizes that these are the "true" inhabitants, lured in and trapped in the town. Mary and Clark think they have escaped but are easily captured in the outskirts of town after hitting a psychedelic bus. Jimi Hendrix steps off the bus and begins playing The Star Spangled Banner on his guitar. A police car with the mayor (who is Elvis Presley) and the chief of police (Otis Redding) pulls up. The musicians ominously reveal that they couldn't have escaped, as the road out is surrounded by swamp, quicksand, bears, and "other things".

As the sun begins to set over Rock and Roll Heaven, Mary and Clark join the ranks of the other imprisoned souls in the park, where the concert is prepared. Mary looks at the other exhausted townsfolk, and chooses to sit next to the waitress from the diner. The young woman has the glazed look of one who is stoned, and talks with the couple. She tells them that her name is Sissy, and reveals that one of her fingers was cut off by Frankie Lymon as punishment for assisting the pair. She also explains that while the concerts must end at midnight, "time is different" in Rock and Roll Heaven; the songs sometimes go on for years. The disc jockey Alan Freed takes the stage and begins to announce an endless series of legendary rock stars. Mary voices her worst fear when she asks Sissy her age; she is 23, and has been that way for seven years. Mary realizes that these are the people who get "lost in the woods" and didn't do anything wrong to deserve this, as Freed continues to scream the names of musicians. He finally shouts: "Rock and roll will never die!", to which Mary thinks the last line of the story: "That's what I'm afraid of."

== Famous inhabitants ==
=== The diner ===
- Janis Joplin, waitress at the diner
- Ricky Nelson, cook at the diner
- Roy Orbison
- Buddy Holly

=== Around town ===
- Ronnie Van Zant
- Duane Allman
- Berry Oakley
- Otis Redding, police officer
- Elvis Presley, mayor
- Frankie Lymon
- Jimi Hendrix, teleplay only
- Jim Morrison, the Lizard King

=== The concert ===
- Alan Freed, M.C. at the concert
- Freddie Mercury
- Florence Ballard
- Mary Wells
- Patsy Cline
- Jim Croce
- Stevie Ray Vaughan
- Keith Moon
- Marvin Gaye
- John Lennon
- Cass Elliot
- John Bonham
- Brian Jones
- J. P. "The Big Bopper" Richardson

== Notes ==
Stephen King describes the story as referencing the inherent creepiness of the high mortality rate among young rock musicians. He also compares and contrasts it with several others, including Children of the Corn and Rainy Season, ultimately rejecting the criticism that it is self-imitation. Instead, he posits that certain horror themes have become archetypes that transcend the superficial plots and instead are about what they cause you to feel.

== Film, TV or theatrical adaptations ==
The story was adapted as one of the episodes of the 2006 Turner Network Television series Nightmares & Dreamscapes: From the Stories of Stephen King.

Bryan Pope of DVD Verdict rated the episode D+ and said that "there's nothing remotely scary about deceased pop icons". In a negative review, Christopher Nosecki of DVD Talk called it "a one note punchline".

The audiobook of this story was read by musician and painter Grace Slick, herself a notable rock figure for her work with Jefferson Airplane, Jefferson Starship, and Starship.

== See also ==
- Stephen King short fiction bibliography
