= Jack Cady =

American writer

- Jack Cady, date unknown
- Born: 20 March 1932; Kentucky
- Died: 14 January 2004 (aged 71)
- Occupation: Author
- Spouse: Carol Orlock
- Writing career
- Pen name: Pat Franklin
- Genres: Fantasy, horror, science fiction
- Notable awards: Nebula Award; World Fantasy Award; Bram Stoker Award

Jack Cady (March 20, 1932 – January 14, 2004) was an American author, born in Kentucky. He is known mostly as a writer of fantasy, horror, and science fiction. He won the Nebula Award, the World Fantasy Award, and the Bram Stoker Award.

Cady was a conscientious objector during the Korean War, but served in the U.S. Coast Guard in Maine. He later had several jobs, including truck driver, auctioneer, landscaper and finally university instructor. He first taught creative writing at the University of Washington from 1968 until 1973, and he then had a number of brief teaching stints at colleges in Illinois, Pennsylvania and Alaska from 1973 to 1978. During 1985 he began teaching writing at Pacific Lutheran University in Tacoma, Washington, and he retired from that job in 1998. Cady married fellow writer Carol Orlock in 1977, and they remained married until his death. Cady's collected literary papers were donated to the Mortvedt Library at Pacific Lutheran University during the spring of 2006.

Cady is perhaps known best for the Nebula-winning novella "The Night We Buried Road Dog" (1993). Stories of his were included in the Best American Short Stories anthologies of 1971 and 1972.

His dystopian novel McDowell's Ghost concerns a modern-day Southerner who keeps seeing the ghost of an ancestor killed during the Civil War; the spirit helps McDowell obtain justice for a female friend who was raped.

Another of Cady's books was The American Writer: Shaping a Nation's Mind, a survey of American literature.

== Bibliography ==
=== Novels ===
- The Well (1981)
- Singleton (1981)
- The Jonah Watch (1982)
- Mc Dowell's Ghost (1982)
- The Man Who Could Make Things Vanish (1983)
- Inagehi (1993)
- Street (1994)
- The Off Season (1995)
- The Hauntings of Hood Canal (2001)
- Rules of '48 (2009)
- — (2014) [1981]. The well. Reprint. Introduction by Tom Piccirilli. Valancourt Books.

Under the pseudonym Pat Franklin:

- "Dark Dreaming" (1991)
- "Embrace of the Wolf" (1993)

=== Short fiction ===
Collections

- The Burning and Other Stories (1972)
- Tattoo (1978)
- The Sons of Noah (1992) (World Fantasy Award winner)
- The Night We Buried Road Dog (1998)
- Ghostland (2001; e-publication)
- Ghosts of Yesterday (2003)

Stories

Title	Year	First published	Reprinted/collected	Notes
"Jeremiah"	2000	Cady, Jack (September 2000). "Jeremiah". F&SF. 99 (3): 141–160.		Novelette
The Night We Buried Road Dog	1993	F&SF (Jan. 1993)	Reprinted in the February 2009 issue, along with an introduction by Kristine Kathryn Rusch.	Novella

=== Non-fiction ===
- The American Writer (1999)

== See also ==
- List of horror fiction authors
- Prime Evil (anthology)
