= Douglas E. Winter =

American writer, critic and lawyer (born 1950)

- Born: October 30, 1950 (age 75); St. Louis, Missouri, United States
- Occupation: Writer

Douglas E. Winter (born October 30, 1950, in St. Louis, Missouri) is an American writer, critic, and lawyer.

== Biography ==
Winter grew up in Granite City, Illinois. He studied at the University of Illinois, earning a B.S. (Bronze Tablet) and M.S. in communications in 1971 and 1972. He graduated from Harvard Law School in 1975 and served as law clerk to Judge William H. Webster, later Director of the Federal Bureau of Investigation and Director of the Central Intelligence Agency. He entered private practice as a lawyer at Covington & Burling in Washington, D.C.

Winter edited horror anthologies Prime Evil (1988) and Revelations (1997; UK: Millennium) as well as the Hugo Award-nominated and World Fantasy Award-winning interviews collection Faces of Fear (1985, revised 1990). He has also written the authorized critical biographies of Stephen King and Clive Barker. His novel Run (2000) was selected as the Best Suspense Novel of the Year by the Book of the Month Club and was nominated for the World Mystery Award. His experimental novella Splatter: A Cautionary Tale (1987) was nominated for the World Fantasy Award. His short stories "Black Sun" (illustrated by Stephen R. Bissette) and "Loop" won the International Horror Award.

Winter has appeared in several documentary films and has provided commentary for blu-ray and DVD releases of a variety of motion pictures, including Candyman, The Dead Zone, Pet Sematary, Salem's Lot, and Uncommon Valor. He was book review columnist for Fantasy Review, Weird Tales, Cemetery Dance, and The Magazine of Fantasy & Science Fiction. He is a member of the National Book Critics Circle.

== Publications ==
=== Books ===
- Run (2000) (Novel)
- A Little Brass Book of Full Metal Fiction (2006)
- Clive Barker: The Dark Fantastic (2001) (Non-Fiction)
- Black Sun (1994)
- Splatter: A Cautionary Tale (1987)
- Stephen King: The Art of Darkness (1984) (Non-Fiction)
- Faces of Fear: Encounters with the Creators of Modern Horror (1985) (Non-Fiction)
- Shadowings: The Reader’s Guide to Horror Fiction (1983) (Non-Fiction)
- The Reader’s Guide to Stephen King (1982) (Non-Fiction)

=== Short Fiction ===
- June 11, 1936 (1980)
- Child of Sorrow (Poem) (1980)
- Masks (1985)
- Street Life (1985)
- Down-Time: A Fable (1986)
- Splatter: A Cautionary Tale (1987) (illustrated by J.K. Potter)
- Office Hours (1987)
- The Happy Family (1989) (with Melissa Mia Hall)
- Less Than Zombie (1989)
- Black Sun (1991) (illustrated by Stephen R. Bissette)
- Bright Lights, Big Zombie (1992)
- Loop (1995)
- Playing Dolls (1995) (with Melissa Mia Hall)
- One More Red Nightmare (1996)
- The Zombies of Madison County (1997)
- Joy Divided (Poem) (1998)
- The Pathos of Genre (1999)
- Blessed Assurance (2003)
- Nothing at All (2006)

=== Editor ===
- Black Wine (1986)
- Night Visions 5 (1988) (aka Dark Visions)
- Prime Evil (1988)
- Revelations (1997)

== Awards ==
Work	Year & Award	Category	Result	Ref.
Faces of Fear: Encounters with the Creators of Modern Horror	1986 Locus Award	Non-Fiction/Reference	Nominated	
Faces of Fear: Encounters with the Creators of Modern Horror	1986 Hugo Award	Related Work	Nominated	
Black Wine	1987 World Fantasy Award	Anthology/Collection	Nominated	
Splatter: A Cautionary Tale	1988 World Fantasy Award	Short Fiction	Nominated	
Night Visions 5	1989 Locus Award	Anthology	Nominated	
Prime Evil	1989 Locus Award	Anthology	Nominated	
Prime Evil	1989 World Fantasy Award	Anthology	Nominated	
Bright Lights, Big Zombie	1992 Bram Stoker Award	Short Fiction	Nominated	
Black Sun	1994 International Horror Guild Award	Short Fiction	Won	
Loop	1995 International Horror Guild Award	Short Fiction	Won	
Loop	1996 World Fantasy Award	Short Fiction	Nominated	
Revelations (UK: Millennium)	1997 International Horror Guild Award	Anthology	Won	
Revelations (UK: Millennium)	1998 World Fantasy Award	Anthology	Nominated	
Revelations (UK: Millennium)	1998 Locus Award	Anthology	Nominated	
The Zombies of Madison County	1997 Bram Stoker Award	Long Fiction	Nominated	
The Zombies of Madison County	1998 World Fantasy Award	Novella	Nominated	
Run	2000 Book of the Month Club	Suspense Novel of the Year	Won	
Run	2000 International Horror Guild Award	First Novel	Nominated	
Run	2000 Bram Stoker Award	First Novel	Nominated	
Run	2001 Anthony Awards	First Novel	Nominated	
Clive Barker: The Dark Fantastic	2002 International Horror Guild Award	Non-Fiction	Nominated	
Clive Barker: The Dark Fantastic	2002 World Fantasy Special Award—Professional	-	Nominated	
Clive Barker: The Dark Fantastic	2003 Locus Award	Non-Fiction	Nominated	

Douglas E. Winter was also nominated for the 1983 World Fantasy Special Award—Professional award for writing & reviewing, won the 1986 World Fantasy Special Award—Non-professional award for reviewing & won the 2003 HWA Silver Hammer Award (Horror Writers Association).

== See also ==
- Winter (name)
