= The Beggar and the Diamond =

- Short story by Stephen King
- Country: United States
- Language: English
- Genre: Short story

Publication
- Published in: Nightmares & Dreamscapes
- Publication type: Anthology
- Publisher: Viking Adult
- Media type: Press (Hardback)
- Publication date: 1993

"The Beggar and the Diamond" is a re-telling of a Hindu parable written by Stephen King which was published as part of his 1993 short story collection, Nightmares & Dreamscapes.

== Plot summary ==
It begins with an author's note explaining that the origin of the story and that in the original Hindu version of the story, God is Shiva and the archangel is his wife, Parvati.

It tells the tale of an old beggar named Ramu who has had a miserable life. One day Ramu is walking along thinking about his unhappy existence and feeling angry at God. God, at the request of an archangel who felt pity for the beggar, drops a massive diamond on his path in plain sight. The diamond is worth so much that it would feed him and all his descendants for several generations. On the ground, Ramu has decided after some pondering that he should not be angry about his life or blame God because he still has a few things to be grateful for, such as retaining his sight at such an old age. To illustrate to himself how much worse life could be if he were blind, he decides to close his eyes as he walks. Ironically, he does not see the diamond because of this and merrily walks past it, missing it by just inches. God takes back the diamond and puts an ironwood branch further up the path. Back in heaven, God says, "The only difference is that Ramu shall find the branch. It shall serve him as a walking stick until the last of his days." The archangel asks God, "Have you just taught me a lesson, God?" God answers, "I don't know. Have I?"

== See also ==
- Stephen King short fiction bibliography
