= Chattery Teeth (short story) =

- Short story by Stephen King
- Country: United States
- Language: English
- Genre: Horror

Publication
- Published in: Cemetery Dance (first release); Nightmares & Dreamscapes
- Publication type: Periodical, Anthology
- Publisher: Cemetery Dance Publications
- Media type: Print (Magazine)
- Publication date: 1992

"Chattery Teeth" is a short story by American writer Stephen King. It was originally published in the Fall 1992 edition of Cemetery Dance magazine and was later collected in Nightmares & Dreamscapes.

== Publication history ==
Stephen King had been a regular reader of Cemetery Dance, a horror magazine, and sent an unsolicited short story to be published there in 1992. The resulting publicity helped to raise their profile.

== Plot summary ==
Salesman Bill Hogan notices an odd pair of walking "Chattery Teeth" (odd due to their unusually large size and the fact that they are made of metal) in the display of a roadside convenience store in the Nevada desert. The store owner ends up giving Hogan the teeth, claiming they had been dropped and no longer work. Hogan is unable to dismiss another oddity: his sense that the teeth are somehow sentient and want to kill him.

As he leaves the convenience store, Hogan reluctantly (having been robbed by a hitchhiker once before) gives a ride to a dishevelled hitchhiker outside the convenience store; his fears prove prophetic when the young man tries to carjack and then kill him. During the struggle, Hogan crashes the van, and before the hitchhiker can fully recover, the teeth come to life and gruesomely disable the criminal by biting off his nose and then testicles. Hogan passes out to the vision of the Chattery Teeth dragging the hitchhiker's prone body off into the desert.

Nine months later, Hogan stops again at the same convenience store, where he is unexpectedly reunited with the "broken" teeth. The store owner's wife recounts how the hitchhiker was found dead out in the desert, presumably killed by wild animals, but also possibly by the teeth, given the large number of bite marks on his body. Hogan realizes the teeth likely never intended to kill him, but instead want to protect him. Mrs. Scooter gives him the teeth again. His theory is proved correct when a dog snarls at him as he leaves and the teeth stir in his pocket, ready to attack anything that means him harm. Hogan resolves to keep the teeth, and eventually pass them on to his son.

== Reception ==
George Beahm called it "quintessential King" and "a horrific little gem of a story". Wiater et al. called it "a bizarre tale" and said that it is reminiscent of "The Monkey", a story collected earlier in Skeleton Crew, however unlike the benevolent Chattery Teeth, the Monkey is a malevolent entity and responsible for multiple deaths in the story.

== Adaptations ==
The short story was turned into a segment in the television movie Quicksilver Highway. The audiobook version was narrated by actress Kathy Bates.

== See also ==
- Stephen King short fiction bibliography
