= The End of the Whole Mess =

- Short story by Stephen King
- Country: United States
- Language: English
- Genre: Science fiction

Publication
- Published in: Omni Magazine (1st release), Nightmares & Dreamscapes
- Publication type: Periodical
- Media type: Print (Magazine, Hardback & Paperback)
- Publication date: 1986

"The End of the Whole Mess" is a short science fiction story by American writer Stephen King, first published in Omni Magazine in 1986. It was collected in King's Nightmares & Dreamscapes in 1993 and in Wastelands: Stories of the Apocalypse in 2008. The story is written in the form of a personal journal, and tells the story of an attempt to cure humanity's aggressive tendencies.

A TV adaptation of the story was produced by TNT as part of Nightmares & Dreamscapes: From the Stories of Stephen King and received positive reviews.

== Plot summary ==
The story, narrated by Howard Fornoy in the form of a personal journal, recounts the life of his younger brother, Robert "Bobby" Fornoy. Bobby, a child prodigy whose adult interests led him to study a variety of scientific disciplines, discovered a chemical that reduces the aggressive tendencies of humans and other organisms. While doing sociological research in Texas, Bobby used crime statistics to create a topographic map which displayed a geographical pattern of violent crime. Examining the map, Bobby noted diminishing levels of crime centered on the town of La Plata. When he arrives to investigate, he finds that this town has never had any violent crime. Bobby is ultimately able to determine that the cause of the non-aggression is the presence of a chemical unique to the town's water supply. Even minimal exposure to the chemical will calm any angry person or animal. Bobby isolates and reduces the chemical to a concentrated form.

At a time of international chaos suggestive of an approaching nuclear war, Bobby and Howard, by means of a volcano in Borneo that is set to erupt and blow millions of tons of ash into the atmosphere, disperse a large quantity of this substance throughout the world, in the hope of preventing a catastrophe. Indeed, the effects are quick and expected, a massive decrease in hostilities around the globe.

Several months later it is discovered, to the Fornoys' horror, that there was another quality of La Plata that was not studied until after the substance was released. The chemical does eliminate aggression, and increases calm, but it does the job too well. Over time the compound accumulates in the brain, causing symptoms resembling dementia or Alzheimer's disease and eventually resulting in death. Howard's journal entries after this point include increasing numbers of grammar, spelling, and other mistakes, eventually devolving into incoherence as Howard succumbs to the effects of the chemical. It is implied the human race will eventually die out as humanity becomes unable to care for themselves.

The style of Howard's entries near the end are reminiscent of those of the character Charlie in Daniel Keyes's book Flowers for Algernon, and of King's own earlier short story, Survivor Type.

== Adaptations ==
"The End of the Whole Mess" was included as the fourth installment of TNT's Nightmares & Dreamscapes: From the Stories of Stephen King, starring Ron Livingston as Howard and Henry Thomas as Bobby. It originally aired on July 19, 2006. In this version, Howard is an Oscar-winning documentary filmmaker instead of a writer, and he tells his story in front of a video camera. In addition, the events of the September 11 attacks are incorporated into the story and are used as a catalyst for Bobby's inspiration. At the end, Bobby and his brother commit suicide by injecting themselves with a concentrate of the aggression-decreasing substance.

Bryan Pope of DVD Verdict rates the television episode an A− and praises the acting. Christopher Noseck of DVD Talk said it is the best episode of the series, both believable and straightforward. Jon Condit of Dread Central rated the episode 4.5/5 stars and wrote, "This is a really touching, character driven, and emotional story."

The audiobook version of this story was narrated by actor Matthew Broderick.

== See also ==
- Stephen King short fiction bibliography
