= Horror Hall of Fame =

Defunct award show

The Horror Hall of Fame was an annual Oscars-style award show hosted by Robert Englund which honored the best horror films, television series, actors, producers and special-effects designers. It ran for three years during October from 1990 to 1992 and was shown in syndication. At the end of Horror Hall of Fame III, the host promised a Horror Hall of Fame IV, but it never happened. All three shows were held at Universal Studios Hollywood.

An unrelated ABC TV special, similarly called "The Horror Hall of Fame", was produced in 1974, hosted by Vincent Price. This show originally aired on February 20 and was a mixture of talk show, comedy skits, and clips from classic horror films.

== The Horror Hall of Fame ==
The first annual program opens with Robert Englund approaching the Bates Motel and house, a parody of a scene from Alfred Hitchcock's Psycho.

Inductees for this year are:

Film - The Exorcist (1973) Presented by Catherine Hicks, accepted by Jason Miller

Actor - Boris Karloff Presented by Roger Corman, accepted by Sara Karloff (daughter of Boris Karloff).

Film - Psycho (1960) Presented by Tim Matheson, accepted by Janet Leigh and Pat Hitchcock (daughter of Alfred Hitchcock).

Film - Night of the Living Dead (1968) Presented by Danny Pintauro and Jason Voorhees portrayed by Kane Hodder, accepted by Russell Streiner and John Russo.

Publisher - Famous Monsters of Filmland Presented by Rick Baker, John Landis, & Joe Dante, accepted by Forrest J Ackerman.

Film - Alien (1979) Presented by Zelda Rubinstein, accepted by Tom Skerritt.

Actor - Vincent Price Presented by Roddy McDowell, accepted by Vincent Price in pre-taped video presentation.

The nominees for best horror film were Darkman, Nightbreed, Arachnophobia, Gremlins 2: The New Batch and Tremors. The winner, presented by Anthony Perkins was Arachnophobia. The award was accepted by Arachnophobia director Frank Marshall and spider 'Big Bob' who descended from the ceiling and carried the statuette up the ceiling.

This program also included:

An examination of foreign language horror films presented by Chucky the Killer Doll (in white tuxedo) voiced by Brad Dourif.

A sneak peek of the films Psycho IV: The Beginning, Jacob's Ladder, Maniac Cop 2, Graveyard Shift and Dark Shadows presented by Sam Kinison.

Special Effect segments hosted by make-up artist Steve Johnson and scream queen Linnea Quigley

Co-hosting segments from The Crypt Keeper.

== The Horror Hall of Fame II ==
The second annual program opens with Robert Englund enjoying a relaxing smoke on a playground which slowly begins to fill with birds, a parody of a scene from Alfred Hitchcock's The Birds.

Inductees for this year are:

Film - The Texas Chain Saw Massacre (1974) Presented by Adrienne Barbeau, accepted by Tobe Hooper.

Publisher - EC Comics Presented by Carel Struycken & James Martin Workman Jr., accepted by William Gaines.

Actor - Béla Lugosi Presented by Richard Moll, accepted by Jeff Lugosi (Béla's grandson).

Producer/Director - Roger Corman Presented by William Shatner, accepted by Roger Corman.

Production Company - Universal Studios Presented by Elvira, accepted by Carla Laemmle (niece of founder Carl Laemmle Sr.)

Film - The Birds Presented by Dee Wallace & Brad Dourif; accepted by Morgan Brittany & Tippi Hedren.

The nominees for best horror film were Misery, Child's Play 2, The Silence of the Lambs, Predator 2 and Jacob's Ladder. The winner, presented by Vincent Price, was The Silence of the Lambs. The award was accepted by Lambs executive producer Gary Goetzman.

This program also included:

A sneak peek of the films The Addams Family, Guilty as Charged and Alien 3 presented by Gilbert Gottfried

A tribute to the passing of Freddy Krueger (Freddy's Dead: The Final Nightmare, which was thought to be the final film featuring the Kruger character, would premiere on Sept. 13th, 1991) by stand-up comic Sam Kinison

Special Effect segments hosted by make-up artist Steve Johnson and scream queen Linnea Quigley

Co-hosting segments from The Crypt Keeper.

== The Horror Hall of Fame III ==
Inductees for this year are:

Film - Bride of Frankenstein (1935).

The nominees for best film for Horror Hall of fame III were The Addams Family, Child's Play 3, Alien 3, Freddy's Dead: The Final Nightmare, The Lawnmower Man and Pet Sematary Two. The winner was The Addams Family, accepted by Carel Struycken.

This program also included:

A sneak peek of the films Dr. Giggles, To Sleep with a Vampire, Beyond Darkness and Nemesis.

A magic performances by stand-up comedian The Amazing Johnathan.

A music performances by Bobby "Boris" Pickett and the Crypt-Kickers with The Monster Mash.

== See also ==
- Rondo Hatton Classic Horror Awards
