= The Night Flier =

- Short story by Stephen King
- Country: United States
- Language: English
- Genre: Horror

Publication
- Published in: Prime Evil: New Stories by the Masters of Modern Horror (1st release), Nightmares & Dreamscapes
- Publication type: Anthology
- Media type: Print (Paperback)
- Publication date: 1988

"The Night Flier" is a horror short story by American writer Stephen King, first published in the 1988 anthology Prime Evil: New Stories by the Masters of Modern Horror, and then in King's own 1993 Nightmares & Dreamscapes collection.

== Plot summary ==
Richard Dees is a deeply cynical reporter for a trashy supermarket tabloid called Inside View. His current subject of investigation is the Night Flier, an apparent serial killer who travels between small airports in a Cessna Skymaster, gruesomely killing people in a way that leads Dees to think the man is a lunatic who believes himself to be a vampire.

After only a few days of interviewing witnesses and following the killer's trail in his own Beechcraft Bonanza, Dees overtakes the Night Flier during a violent thunderstorm at Wilmington International Airport, and quickly learns that he is badly mistaken about his would-be quarry; it is, indeed, a vampire that is doing the killings. After Dees watches the Night Flier casually empty the bloody contents of his bladder into an airport urinal (or as much of this act as he can see reflected in a mirror), the creature warns off his "would-be biographer," destroys his photographic evidence, and leaves the mortally shaken reporter amidst a scene of carnage to explain himself to police and watch as the Night Flier's plane takes off.

== Publication ==
"The Night Flier" was first published in the 1988 anthology Prime Evil: New Stories by the Masters of Modern Horror. It was collected in King's 1993 book Nightmares & Dreamscapes.

== Connections to other works ==
Dees previously made a brief appearance in King's novel The Dead Zone. In the notes of Nightmares and Dreamscapes, King states that the Night Flier could also be the titular character of his short story "Popsy".

The character of the Night Flier is used by Kim Newman in his short story "You Are the Wind Beneath My Wings". In it, he is paired with the character Rainbird from Firestarter, with both working for the Shop. Newman gives the Night Flier the name of Andrews.

The Inside View is a sensationalist tabloid pushing blood, gore, and mystery stories about alien abductions and the like, and has also been mentioned in several of King's novels and novellas, such as Desperation, Insomnia, The Dark Tower III: The Waste Lands, Bag of Bones, Needful Things, Doctor Sleep, From a Buick 8, Elevation, and If It Bleeds.

== Adaptations ==
The story was adapted into the 1997 film of the same name directed by Mark Pavia and starring Miguel Ferrer as Dees. The film adaptation follows the original plot fairly closely (and maintains Dees' deeply unsympathetic nature), except for adding a rival in the form of up-and-coming female reporter Katherine Blair, and changing Dees' ultimate fate.

== Reception ==
Kevin Thomas of the Los Angeles Times called the story "King's jeremiad against the tabloid press", though he states that there is a degree of hypocrisy to the satire, given that King himself makes a living selling sensationalistic stories. George Beahm called it "prime King" that "eschew[s] Anne Rice-type vampires".

== See also ==
- Stephen King short fiction bibliography
