= Faces of Fear (interview book) =

- First edition
- Author: Douglas E. Winter
- Language: English
- Publisher: Berkley Books
- Publication date: 1985
- Publication place: United States
- Media type: Print
- Pages: 277
- ISBN: 0-425-07670-9

Faces of Fear is a World Fantasy award-winning book (Berkley Books 1985, revised 1990) where writer, critic and lawyer Douglas E. Winter interviews seventeen contemporary British and American horror writers about their life and art. The writers are V. C. Andrews, Clive Barker, William Peter Blatty, Robert Bloch, Ramsey Campbell, John Coyne, Dennis Etchison, Charles L. Grant, James Herbert, T. E. D. Klein, Stephen King, Michael McDowell, Richard Matheson, David Morrell, Alan Ryan, Whitley Strieber and Peter Straub.

The book was a finalist for the 1986 Hugo Award for Best Non-Fiction Book.
