= The Ten O'Clock People =

- Short story by Stephen King
- Country: United States
- Language: English
- Genre: Horror short story

Publication
- Published in: Nightmares & Dreamscapes
- Publication type: Anthology
- Publisher: Viking Adult
- Media type: Print (Hardcover)
- Publication date: 1993

"The Ten O'Clock People" is a short story by American author Stephen King, published in the Nightmares & Dreamscapes collection. Unlike many of King's stories which take place in fictional places like Castle Rock, Maine, "The Ten O'Clock People" takes place in Boston, Massachusetts. A film adaptation has been announced.

== Plot ==
Pearson, a Boston office worker, inadvertently discovers that people of authority, including many police officers and political figures, including the Vice President of the United States, are bat-like inhuman monsters disguised as people. While on his 10 o'clock smoke break, Pearson perceives the bat-like creatures through their disguises. Noticing his reaction, a young black man named Dudley "Duke" Rhinemann stops him from screaming and calms him down. Rhinemann explains that if Pearson wants to live, he must go about his day as usual and meet him at 3 o'clock after work. Pearson does as he is told and discovers that his boss is also one of the "batmen". He leaves work a bit shaken, meets Rhinemann and goes to a bar with him. Rhinemann explains that a unique chemical imbalance caused by nicotine withdrawal is the only way to see the creatures and invites Pearson to a resistance meeting.

Shortly after arriving, the leader of the group says he has "big news" for them all, but then launches into a never-ending, pointless speech. Pearson realizes the man is stalling for time and gives warning. The treacherous resistance leader desperately insists the batmen have promised amnesty as batmen ruthlessly storm the building. Many die, including Rhinemann. Pearson, along with two others, escape the meeting. The trio flee to Omaha and form a new resistance group of Ten O'Clock People. This group successfully kills many "batmen", and Pearson notes that their war against the batmen was a lot like quitting smoking: "...you have to start somewhere."

== Inspiration and literary allusions ==
Several of King's other stories, most notably Low Men in Yellow Coats and The Dark Tower, feature malevolent creatures called Can-toi, which bear a resemblance to the "batmen" of The Ten O'Clock People. Servants of the Crimson King, the Can-toi are vaguely humanoid beings with large rodent heads, which they hide beneath masks in order to infiltrate human society. King references Raymond Chandler in the story as, to disguise the real reason of the meeting, the resistance claim to be Raymond Chandler enthusiasts.

In Nightmares & Dreamscapes's ending notes, King states that he intended "The Ten O'Clock People" as a Jim Crow analogy about how mainstream society sequesters smokers from the general population:

I hope ["The Ten O'Clock People"] says something interesting about a wave of change which has, temporarily, at least, re-created some aspects of the separate-but-equal facilities of the forties and fifties.

It has been noted that the plot of King's story also resembles the premise of John Carpenter's movie They Live, made in 1988, which itself was based on the story "Eight O'Clock in the Morning" by Ray Nelson.

== Reception ==
George Beahm wrote in his encyclopedia of King stories that plot summaries can not do the story justice and that it must be read to appreciate the bizarreness. He further compared it to Invasion of the Body Snatchers. In The Essential Steven King, author Stephen J. Spignesi called it a complete horror film told in 50 pages that begs for a film adaptation.

== Adaptations ==
In May 2011, Making Ten O'clock Productions acquired the rights to adapt "The Ten O'Clock People" into a feature film starring Jay Baruchel. The film's plot is a modernization of King's original story and will be directed by Tom Holland. It was announced in July 2015 that the new title of the film is Cessation.

In February 2021, it was reported that a television adaptation of "The Ten O'Clock People" was being developed by Fabel Entertainment.

The audiobook adaptation of this story is read by actor Joe Morton.

== See also ==
- Stephen King short fiction bibliography
