= Brooklyn August =

Poem by Stephen King

- Short story by Stephen King
- Country: United States
- Language: English
- Genre: Poetry

Publication
- Published in: Io (1st release), Nightmares & Dreamscapes
- Publication type: Magazine
- Media type: Print

"Brooklyn August" is a poem by Stephen King that first appeared in 1971 in Io magazine and was later collected in King's Nightmares & Dreamscapes in 1993. It also pairs with another story in that collection, "Head Down." An audiobook of the poem was read by evolutionary biologist Stephen Jay Gould.

== Synopsis ==
The poem is reflective, a nostalgic look back at what many consider the glory days of baseball as America's national pastime, focusing on the heyday of the Los Angeles Dodgers as the Brooklyn Dodgers under the management of Walter Alston. The poem's title reflects its tone, as it describes the team's 1956 heyday at their Ebbets Field home, now long since demolished. The poem mentions many of the players associated with the club, celebrating their accomplishments, and ends on a wistful note: the writer can still see it if he closes his eyes, again bringing in the main theme of the poem, of a golden age past.

== See also ==
- Stephen King short fiction bibliography
