= Wastelands: Stories of the Apocalypse =

2008 post-apocalyptic fiction book

- First edition cover art
- Editor: John Joseph Adams
- Cover artist: Daniel Kvasznicza
- Subject: Apocalypse, End of the world (fiction)
- Genre: Science fiction, dystopia
- Publisher: Night Shade Books
- Publication date: 2008
- Media type: Book
- ISBN: 9781597801058
- OCLC: 166390474

Wastelands: Stories of the Apocalypse is an anthology of post-apocalyptic fiction published by Night Shade Books in January 2008, edited by John Joseph Adams.

The anthology includes 22 stories, plus an introduction by the editor. According to the anthology's official web site, "Wastelands explores the scientific, psychological, and philosophical questions of what it means to remain human in the wake of Armageddon." It received very positive reviews, with critics describing it as "belong[ing] in most sf or short fiction collections" and "a well-chosen selection of well-crafted stories, offering something to please nearly every postapocalyptic palate."

It was followed up by Wastelands 2: More Stories of the Apocalypse in February 2015, and Wastelands: The New Apocalypse in June 2019, both under Titan Books.

The first Wasteland book won the FantLab's Book of the Year Award for Best Anthology and was nominated for the Locus Award for Best Anthology

== Contents ==
- Introduction by John Joseph Adams
- "The End of the Whole Mess" by Stephen King
- "Salvage" by Orson Scott Card
- "The People of Sand and Slag" by Paolo Bacigalupi
- "Bread and Bombs" by M. Rickert
- "How We Got In Town and Out Again" by Jonathan Lethem
- "Dark, Dark Were the Tunnels" by George R. R. Martin
- "Waiting for the Zephyr" by Tobias S. Buckell
- "Never Despair" by Jack McDevitt
- "When Sysadmins Ruled the Earth" by Cory Doctorow
- "The Last of the O-Forms" by James Van Pelt
- "Still Life With Apocalypse" by Richard Kadrey
- "Artie’s Angels" by Catherine Wells
- "Judgment Passed" by Jerry Oltion
- "Mute" by Gene Wolfe
- "Inertia" by Nancy Kress
- "And the Deep Blue Sea" by Elizabeth Bear
- "Speech Sounds" by Octavia E. Butler
- "Killers" by Carol Emshwiller
- "Ginny Sweethips’ Flying Circus" by Neal Barrett, Jr.
- "The End of the World as We Know It" by Dale Bailey
- "A Song Before Sunset" by David Grigg
- "Episode Seven: Last Stand Against the Pack in the Kingdom of the Purple Flowers" by John Langan
- "Appendix: For Further Reading" by John Joseph Adams

== See also ==
- Apocalyptic and post-apocalyptic fiction
- List of apocalyptic and post-apocalyptic fiction
