= Sneakers (short story) =

- Short story by Stephen King
- Country: United States
- Language: English
- Genre: Horror short story

Publication
- Published in: Night Visions 5 (1st release), Nightmares & Dreamscapes
- Publication type: Anthology
- Publisher: Orion
- Media type: Print (Paperback)
- Publication date: August 10, 1989

"Sneakers" is a short story by American author Stephen King. It was published in the compilation book Dark Visions and in his collection Nightmares & Dreamscapes.

== Plot summary ==
Recording studio executive John Tell notices a pair of old dirty sneakers in an adjacent stall while using the restroom at work. He, at first, assumes that the shoes belong to a fellow employee or a delivery person. However, when he visits the bathroom again throughout the week, he notices that not only have the shoes not moved, they are now surrounded by the bodies of dead flies and other bugs. Eventually, Tell discovers that the shoes were the trademark of a dealer who supplied the local talent with cocaine, and who was killed in the bathroom stall during an apparent robbery. Tell finally confronts the man's ghost, who informs him that he was brutally killed by Jannings, Tell's boss, a drug addict who was heavily in debt to the dealer at the time. Jannings used the stolen cocaine to fund his rehabilitation and rise to executive management. This prompts Tell to quit his job, telling Jannings he is a "worthless bastard" before leaving. When he arrives home, he resolves to find other work, pulling out the want ads and reading them while doing his business on his own toilet.

== Reception & Adaptations ==
Rocky Wood describes "Sneakers" as "unsatisfying".

The audiobook of this story is read by director David Cronenberg, who had previously directed the King adaptation The Dead Zone.

== See also ==
- Stephen King short fiction bibliography
