= Prime Evil (anthology) =

- Dust-jacket from the first edition
- Author: edited by Douglas E. Winter
- Cover artist: Thomas Canty
- Language: English
- Genre: Horror
- Publisher: New American Library
- Publication date: 1988
- Publication place: United States
- Media type: Print (hardback)
- Pages: 322
- ISBN: 0-453-00572-1
- OCLC: 17260145
- Dewey Decimal: 813/.0872/08 19
- LC Class: PS648.H6 P7 1988

Prime Evil is an anthology of horror short stories edited by Douglas E. Winter. It was first published in 1988 by New American Library. With the exception of the Dennis Etchison story, "The Blood Kiss", the stories are original to this anthology.

== Contents ==
- Introduction, by Douglas E. Winter
- "The Night Flier", by Stephen King
- "Having a Woman at Lunch", by Paul E. Hazel
- "The Blood Kiss", by Dennis Etchison
- "Coming to Grief", by Clive Barker
- "Food", by Thomas Tessier
- "The Great God Pan", by M. John Harrison
- "Orange Is for Anguish, Blue for Insanity", by David Morrell
- "The Juniper Tree", by Peter Straub
- "Spinning Tales with the Dead", by Charles L. Grant
- "Alice’s Last Adventure", by Thomas Ligotti
- "Next Time You’ll Know Me", by Ramsey Campbell
- "The Pool", by Whitley Strieber
- "By Reason of Darkness", by Jack Cady

== Sources ==
- Brown, Charles N.; William G. Contento (2007-11-20). "The Locus Index to Science Fiction (1984-1998)".
- Chalker, Jack L.; Mark Owings (1998). The Science-Fantasy Publishers: A Bibliographic History, 1923-1998. Westminster, MD and Baltimore: Mirage Press, Ltd. pp. 332–333.
