= Thing (The Addams Family) =

Fictional character in The Addams Family

- The Addams Family character
- Thing (played by the right hand of Christopher Hart) as shown running on its fingertips in the 1991 feature film
- First appearance: Homebodies (1954)
- Created by: Charles Addams
- Portrayed by: Ted Cassidy (1964); Christopher Hart (1991, 1993, 1998); Steven Fox (1998); Victor Dorobantu (2022–present)

In-universe information
- Full name: Thing T. Thing
- Species: Disembodied right or left hand (depending on depiction)
- Gender: Male
- Family: The Addams Family
- Nationality: American

Thing T. Thing, often referred to as just Thing, is a fictional character in The Addams Family series. The Addamses call it "Thing" because it is something that cannot be identified, being originally an unseen creature in the original cartoons. Starting with the live-action television series, it was settled to be a disembodied hand. It is known as "Mãozinha" (Little Hand) in Brazil, "Cosa" (Thing) in Spain, "Dedos" (Fingers) in Hispanic America, "Mano" (Hand) in Italy, "La Chose" (the Thing) in French-speaking countries, "eiskaltes Händchen" (icecold little hand) in German-speaking countries, "Rąsia" (Small hand) in Polish, and "Izé" (Whatchamacallit, Thingamajig) in Hungarian.

== Appearances ==
=== In The Addams Family media ===
"The Thing is often observed watching the family through the balustrades of the balcony over the living room. We don't know quite who or what he is, but, whatever, he's the soul of good nature—at least, he grins perpetually and may occasionally whimper." — Charles Addams

(The) Thing was the creation of Charles Addams, who drew the Addams Family cartoons in The New Yorker magazine beginning in the 1930s. The Thing first appeared in Addams' 1954 book Homebodies. According to Phil Hore, Addams was inspired by Phil Harris's 1950 novelty song "The Thing". One of Addams' cartoons introduced a mysterious entity known only as The Thing, which was said to be too horrifying to be seen by human eyes. In contrast to the adaptations, the cartoon version of the Thing is actually a person of unknown origin, observing the household through slightly-opened doors and the balustrades, from around corners, and even beneath window sills with his face and hands clearly seen by the reader.

The 1964 television series greatly expanded Thing's role compared to the cartoons. Thing was retconned as a disembodied forearm, since he occasionally emerged from his box at near-elbow length, and was usually played by Ted Cassidy, who also played the lugubrious butler Lurch. The two characters occasionally appeared in the same scene (in which case Thing would be played by a crew member, notably assistant director Jack Voglin). Thing customarily emerged from a series of boxes, one in each room in the Addams' mansion, and the mailbox outside. He occasionally emerged from behind a curtain, within a plant pot, from the family wall safe, or elsewhere.

Since Cassidy was 6 feet 9 inches (2.06 m) tall, using him to depict Thing caused great technical difficulties on the set of The Addams Family. In many scenes he lay on his back on a wheeled trolley below the line of sight of the cameras and inserted his arm through the bottom of the box. Thing was usually a right hand, but Cassidy sometimes played him as left, simply to see if anyone would notice. Thing is credited as "Itself" at the end of each episode.

In the later films, thanks to advances in special effects, Thing (played by Christopher Hart's hand) is able to emerge and run on his fingertips, much like a spider. In Addams Family Values, Thing is shown driving a car into Debbie to rescue Uncle Fester. After this, Fester gets into the car and Thing drives them off to the Addams Family Mansion, albeit erratically, frightening Fester in the process. This is also true for the 1998 series The New Addams Family where Thing was played by the hand of Canadian magician/actor Steven Fox. His classic box only appears in one episode of the series (the remake of "Thing's Romance"); in others, he lives in a closet that has been modified as his own "house-within-a-house".

In the musical, Thing only appears in the beginning when he opens the curtain. He is played by a member of the ensemble. In the tour version, Pugsley carries Thing on a pillow at Wednesday and Lucas's wedding while Thing holds the ring.

Thing appears in the 2019 animated film as a disembodied hand wearing a watch with an eye on it in some scenes; he is also shown to have a foot fetish. Thing also appears in the 2021 animated film sequel with a fingerless leather glove, again wearing a watch with an eye, which is used at various times to express Thing's feelings, such as indicating exasperation with an eye roll.

Thing appears in the 2022 live-action Netflix original series Wednesday, portrayed by Victor Dorobantu. Makeup was used to enhance Thing's appearance with stitches and marks. During filming, Dorobantu would be hidden while wearing a blue suit. Thing's language was made up on the day of filming. A stand-in hand was used instead of Dorobantu for certain takes. After each take, CGI was added to Thing and editors removed Dorobantu's body and created a skin to cover the top of Thing's wrist. Gomez puts him in charge of watching over Wednesday while she attends Nevermore Academy only for Wednesday to force him to help her with solving the mysteries of the school and the town of Jericho. Thing also befriended the werewolf student Enid Sinclair. In the final episode of season two, it is revealed that Thing is the severed right hand of Isaac Night, a student killed in self-defense by Morticia and Gomez when they were children; "Thing" was an anagram of "Night", and it is speculated that Thing is the manifestation of all that was good in Isaac before he became corrupted. Thing was briefly reattached to Isaac Night's zombie form until Thing broke free from his control during the final battle, urged on by the Addams' assertions that Thing is part of their family rather than part of Isaac, and killed Isaac by removing his mechanical heart.

=== In other media ===
In the PlayStation game Medievil (1998), the first few levels featured Thing-looking, disembodied hands going about the same way Thing does.

In December 2021, Thing appeared in advertisements for British furniture retailer DFS as part of their "find your thing" campaign.

In 2024, an advertisement which aired on Italian television featured Thing with a voice-over directly referencing the Addams family.

== Role in the series ==
Thing's many useful roles included fetching the mail, handing cigars to Gomez Addams and then lighting them, changing the channel on the Addamses’ TV set, holding Morticia Addams's wool while she knits, turning grapes into wine in under a minute, and turning over records on the phonograph (particularly when Gomez and Morticia dance the tango). It accompanies the family on drives by riding in the glove compartment, and in one episode, in which Gomez appears in court, it emerges from Gomez's briefcase. Thing and Grandmama are fond of arm-wrestling. In a flashback episode on how Gomez and Morticia met, it is revealed that Thing has been with the Addams family since Gomez was a child, suggesting Thing is the son of an earlier generation of hand-servants (see below). Thing, overall, acts as the straight man of the show.

Morticia is always appreciative of Thing's services, and her frequent "Thank you, Thing" is a well known line of the series; Wednesday takes after her mother in also expressing gratitude for Thing's assistance. Thing cannot talk, but does sometimes snap its fingers to attract attention, and it is also able to communicate by signaling in Morse code, writing, or with the help of the manual alphabet. This can be disconcerting to visitors to the Addams' mansion; in a running gag in some episodes, a visitor to the Addams home, grateful for some kindness of the Addamses', shakes hands with everyone present — "Thank you, Mr. Addams! Thank you, Mrs. Addams!" — and is then offered a handshake by Thing. "And thank you…" begins the visitor, before realizing what he has been confronted with, and fleeing the premises.

In one episode, Morticia gets goosed, and initially suspects Thing who had been nearby moments earlier. However, Gomez immediately appears and admits responsibility, explaining: "Thing just likes to hold hands."

== Other hands ==
On the 1960s TV series, two similar hands were introduced in the episode "Morticia Meets Royalty":

- Lady Fingers: A female "handmaiden" who was the servant of Aunt Millie, also known as Princess Millicent von Schlepp. When Millicent came to visit, Thing and Lady Fingers fell in love. Lady Fingers later returned in Halloween with the New Addams Family, as the handmaiden of Granny Frump and the 1998 series revival, as the handmaiden of Cousin Pretensia. Her name is a play on Ladyfinger (biscuit).
- Esmerelda: Another female hand hired by Millicent after firing Lady Fingers. Esmerelda turned out to be a thief and Millicent rehired Lady Fingers.

In the episode "Thing Is Missing", Gomez and Morticia find a portrait of Thing's parents, a male hand and a female hand. The 1990s revived series implied the existence of other hands as well; whereas the second season of the 2022 series presented a more general phenomenon of disembodied parts having independent existences - including legs, eyes and ears.
