= Crouch End (short story) =

- Short story by Stephen King
- Country: United States
- Language: English
- Genres: Horror, Science fiction short story

Publication
- Published in: New Tales of the Cthulhu Mythos (1st release), Nightmares & Dreamscapes
- Publication type: Anthology
- Media type: Print (Paperback)
- Publication date: 1980
- Series: Cthulhu Mythos

"Crouch End" is a horror story by Stephen King, set in the real-life North London district of Crouch End, originally published in New Tales of the Cthulhu Mythos (1980), and republished in a slightly different version in King's Nightmares & Dreamscapes collection (1993). It contains distinct references to the horror fiction of H. P. Lovecraft.

A television adaptation aired July 12, 2006 on TNT, as part of Nightmares & Dreamscapes: From the Stories of Stephen King. A song by British black metal/dark ambient band The Axis of Perdition uses excerpts from the story as lyrics.

== Plot ==
Police constables Ted Vetter and Robert Farnham are working the night shift at a small station in the London suburb of Crouch End. They discuss the case of Doris Freeman, a young American woman who came in to report the disappearance of her husband, lawyer Lonnie Freeman. Nearly hysterical, Doris arrived in the station speaking of monsters and supernatural occurrences.

Doris relates how she and her husband got lost while searching for his colleague's house in Crouch End. While they are looking up the colleague's address in a phone book, the cab they had hired mysteriously disappears, and the entire neighborhood becomes strangely deserted and alien, with the sole exception of a cat with a scarred face and two children, one of whom has a deformed hand. After encountering something unseen beyond a hedge, Lonnie becomes unhinged. He eventually disappears while the couple is walking through a tunnel, leaving Doris alone and scared out of her mind as the surroundings become increasingly bizarre; even the night sky no longer shows Earth's stars, but some unknown alien sky. Eventually, Doris once again encounters the two disfigured children, who summon an enormous, hideous, otherworldly being from beneath the ground of Crouch End (implied to be the Lovecraftian goddess Shub-Niggurath). The monster has seemingly consumed Lonnie along with countless others, whose spirits are now trapped in its body and whose faces Doris glimpses trapped in the body of the being. After that, Doris remembers nothing else until she woke up huddled in an entranceway back in the real world.

Newcomer Farnham dismisses the story as a delusion caused by mental illness, but Vetter, who has policed Crouch End for decades, is not so sure, remembering a number of similar missing-person cases from years gone by. He speculates about other planes of existence, and of Crouch End perhaps being a location where the divide between our world and an alien, demonic world is somehow less robust.

Vetter goes out for a walk. After contemplating the story for a while, Farnham wonders what has become of him. Leaving the station empty, he walks down the street in search of Vetter and notices that something seems strangely different about the neighborhood, most notably that the streetlights at the bottom of the street have all gone out. Farnham turns the corner at the bottom of the street and walks out of sight of the station — and is never seen again. Vetter returns from his walk just minutes later and can find no clue to Farnham's whereabouts. The official investigation into his vanishing can find no leads, and Vetter reaches retirement age soon after; he dies of a heart attack in his home six months later. Doris returns to America with her children, where she attempts suicide and spends time in a mental hospital, but eventually learns to live with the memory of Crouch End and is released. The story ends with the statement that there are still strange occurrences in Crouch End, and that, very occasionally, people are "known to lose their way. Some of them lose it forever."

== Adaptations ==
The short story was adapted into an episode of TNT's Nightmares & Dreamscapes: From the Stories of Stephen King. The episode was directed by Mark Haber and starred Eion Bailey and Claire Forlani. Virginia Heffernan of The New York Times said that it "has a simpler charm" than previous episodes and that the couple's terror at being lost makes "a grand subject for horror." Bryan Pope of DVD Verdict rated the episode D+ and stated that the story doesn't work on television. Christopher Noseck of DVD Talk panned the episode in part because of the special effects, which he called "laughable".

The audiobook version of this story was narrated by actor Tim Curry.

In August 2026, the six-part limited series adaptation was ordered by Amazon Prime Video, with Paul Tomalin and Tom Shankland serving as writer and director respectively.

== See also ==
- Stephen King short fiction bibliography
