= Rumpole of the Bailey (book series) =

Book series by John Mortimer

Rumpole of the Bailey is a series of books created and written by the British writer and barrister John Mortimer based on the television series Rumpole of the Bailey.

Mortimer adapted his television scripts into a series of short stories and novels starting in 1978. A series of anthologies and omnibus editions were also released.

== First publications of short stories and novels ==
=== Adaptations of TV scripts ===
- Rumpole of the Bailey (1978) (TV season one)
  - "Rumpole and the Younger Generation"
  - "Rumpole and the Alternative Society"
  - "Rumpole and the Honourable Member"
  - "Rumpole and the Married Lady"
  - "Rumpole and the Learned Friends"
  - "Rumpole and the Heavy Brigade"
- The Trials of Rumpole (1979) (TV season two)
  - "Rumpole and the Man of God"
  - "Rumpole and the Showfolk"
  - "Rumpole and the Fascist Beast"
  - "Rumpole and the Case of Identity"
  - "Rumpole and the Course of True Love"
  - "Rumpole and the Age for Retirement"
- Rumpole's Return (1980) (novel based on the stand-alone 1980 TV special)
- Regina v. Rumpole (1981) (1980 BBC radio series and the 1975 one-off film for BBC TV's Play for Today series; re-published in 1982 as Rumpole for the Defence)
  - "Rumpole and the Confession of Guilt"
  - "Rumpole and the Gentle Art of Blackmail"
  - "Rumpole and the Dear Departed"
  - "Rumpole and the Rotten Apple"
  - "Rumpole and the Expert Witness"
  - "Rumpole and the Spirit of Christmas" (a.k.a. "Rumpole and the Defence of Guthrie Featherstone")
  - "Rumpole and the Boat People" (a.k.a. "Rumpole and the Perils of the Sea")
- Rumpole and the Golden Thread (1983) (TV season three)
  - "Rumpole and the Genuine Article"
  - "Rumpole and the Golden Thread"
  - "Rumpole and the Old Boy Net"
  - "Rumpole and the Female of the Species"
  - "Rumpole and the Sporting Life"
  - "Rumpole and the Last Resort"
- Rumpole's Last Case (1987) (TV season four)
  - "Rumpole and the Blind Tasting"
  - "Rumpole and the Old, Old Story"
  - "Rumpole and the Official Secret"
  - "Rumpole and the Judge's Elbow"
  - "Rumpole and the Bright Seraphim"
  - "Rumpole's Last Case"
  - "Rumpole and the Winter Break" (story not used in the TV series)
- Rumpole and the Age of Miracles (1988) (TV season five)
  - "Rumpole and the Bubble Reputation"
  - "Rumpole and the Barrow Boy"
  - "Rumpole and the Age of Miracles"
  - "Rumpole and the Tap End"
  - "Rumpole and Portia"
  - "Rumpole and the Quality of Life"
  - "Rumpole and the Chambers Party" (story not used in the TV series)
- Rumpole à la Carte (1990) (TV season six)
  - "Rumpole à la Carte"
  - "Rumpole and the Summer of Discontent"
  - "Rumpole and the Right to Silence"
  - "Rumpole at Sea"
  - "Rumpole and the Quacks"
  - "Rumpole for the Prosecution"
- Rumpole on Trial (1992) (TV season seven)
  - "Rumpole and the Children of the Devil"
  - "Rumpole and the Eternal Triangle"
  - "Rumpole and the Miscarriage of Justice"
  - "Rumpole and the Family Pride"
  - "Rumpole and the Reform of Joby Jonson"
  - "Rumpole on Trial"
  - "Rumpole and the Soothsayer" (story not used in the TV series)

=== Books of new stories ===
- Rumpole and the Angel of Death (1994)
  - "Rumpole and the Model Prisoner"
  - "Rumpole and the Way Through the Woods"
  - "Hilda's Story"
  - "Rumpole and the Little Boy Lost"
  - "Rumpole and the Rights of Man"
  - "Rumpole and the Angel of Death"
- Rumpole Rests His Case (2001)
  - "Rumpole and the Old Familiar Faces"
  - "Rumpole and the Remembrance of Things Past"
  - "Rumpole and the Asylum Seekers"
  - "Rumpole and the Camberwell Carrot"
  - "Rumpole and the Actor Laddie"
  - "Rumpole and the Teenage Werewolf"
  - "Rumpole Rests His Case"
- Rumpole and the Primrose Path (2002)
  - "Rumpole and the Primrose Path"
  - "Rumpole and the New Year's Resolutions"
  - "Rumpole and the Scales of Justice"
  - "Rumpole and the Right to Privacy"
  - "Rumpole and the Vanishing Juror"
  - "Rumpole Redeemed"

=== New novels ===
- Rumpole and the Penge Bungalow Murders (2004)
- Rumpole and the Reign of Terror (2006)
- The Anti-social Behaviour of Horace Rumpole (2007) (published in the US as Rumpole Misbehaves)

== Collections of previously published works ==
There have been seven collections that have presented previously published Rumpole stories. These comprise three volumes of an "Omnibus" series that each gathered together three previously issued sets of stories into a single book, three books that each presented a collection of tales drawn from across the broad canon of Rumpole short stories and one volume of Christmas-themed stories that had each been previously published in a magazine rather than in a Rumpole book.

The First Rumpole Omnibus (1983) contains all six short stories in the 1978 collection Rumpole of the Bailey; all six short stories in the 1979 collection "The Trials of Rumpole" and the 1980 single-story novel Rumpole's Return.

The Second Rumpole Omnibus (1987) contains all seven short stories in the 1981 collection Regina v. Rumpole; all six short stories in the 1983 collection Rumpole and the Golden Thread and all seven short stories in the 1987 collection Rumpole's Last Case.

The Third Rumpole Omnibus (1997) contains all seven short stories in the 1988 collection Rumpole and the Age of Miracles; all six short stories in the 1990 collection Rumpole à la Carte and all six short stories in the 1995 collection Rumpole and the Angel of Death.

The Best of Rumpole: A Personal Choice (1993) contains seven Rumpole stories personally selected as favourites by John Mortimer.

- "Rumpole and the Younger Generation" – from Rumpole of the Bailey (1978)
- "Rumpole and the Showfolk" – from The Trials of Rumpole (1979)
- "Rumpole and the Bubble Reputation" – from Rumpole and the Age of Miracles (1988)
- "Rumpole and the Tap End" – from Rumpole and the Age of Miracles (1988)
- "Rumpole à la Carte" – from Rumpole à la Carte (1990)
- "Rumpole and the Children of the Devil" – from Rumpole on Trial (1992)
- "Rumpole on Trial" – from Rumpole on Trial (1992)

Rumpole (1994) is an illustrated Folio Society anthology comprising Rumpole stories personally chosen and introduced by John Mortimer.

- "Rumpole and the Younger Generation" – from Rumpole of the Bailey (1978)
- "Rumpole and the Showfolk" – from The Trials of Rumpole (1979)
- "Rumpole and the Old Boy Net" – from Rumpole and the Golden Thread (1983)
- "Rumpole and the Bright Seraphim" – from Rumpole's Last Case (1987)
- "Rumpole and the Tap End" – from Rumpole and the Age of Miracles (1988)
- "Rumpole and the Bubble Reputation" – from Rumpole and the Age of Miracles (1988)
- "Rumpole à la Carte" – from Rumpole à la Carte (1990)
- "Rumpole and the Children of the Devil" – from Rumpole on Trial (1992)
- "Rumpole and the Family Pride" – from Rumpole on Trial (1992)
- "Rumpole on Trial" – from Rumpole on Trial (1992)

Rumpole at Christmas (2009) is a collection of seven Christmas-themed short stories – some first published in US or UK magazines. (The UK book contained seven stories. The US version – titled A Rumpole Christmas – contained five stories. It omitted "Millennium Bug" and "Christmas Party".)

- "Rumpole and the Old Familiar Faces"
- "Rumpole and the Christmas Break"
- "Rumpole and the Boy"
- "Rumpole and Father Christmas"
- "Rumpole and the Health Farm Murder" (US title "Rumpole's Slimmed-down Christmas")
- "Rumpole and the Millennium Bug"
- "Rumpole and the Christmas Party"

Forever Rumpole (2012) contains a total of fourteen Rumpole stories, the seven stories that were personally selected as favourites by John Mortimer in the 1993 anthology The Best of Rumpole: A Personal Choice plus the following seven stories selected from the short stories published in the years after the 1993 anthology. (The book also contains the first few pages written by Mortimer for a new story titled "Rumpole and the Brave New World" that he was working on at the time of his death and thus was incomplete.)

- "Rumpole and the Way Through the Woods" – from Rumpole and the Angel of Death (1995)
- "Rumpole and the Angel of Death" – from Rumpole and the Angel of Death (1995)
- "Rumpole and the Old Familiar Faces" – from Rumpole Rests His Case (2001)
- "Rumpole Rests His Case" – from Rumpole Rests His Case (2001)
- "Rumpole and the Primrose Path" – from Rumpole and the Primrose Path (2002)
- "Rumpole Redeemed" – from Rumpole and the Primrose Path (2002)
- "Rumpole and the Christmas Break" – from Rumpole at Christmas (2009)
