= Dolan's Cadillac (film) =

- Directed by: Jeff Beesley
- Screenplay by: Richard Dooling
- Based on: "Dolan's Cadillac" by Stephen King
- Produced by: Stephen Onda; Alain Gagnon; Rhonda Baker
- Starring: Wes Bentley; Christian Slater; Emmanuelle Vaugier
- Cinematography: Gerald Packer
- Edited by: Daryl K. Davis
- Music by: James Mark Stewart
- Production companies: Cadillac Prairie Productions; Minds Eye Entertainment
- Distributed by: G2 Pictures; Film Bridge International
- Release dates: July 1, 2009 (Sweden); April 6, 2010 (United States and Canada)
- Running time: 105 minutes
- Country: Canada
- Language: English
- Budget: $10 million

Dolan's Cadillac is a 2009 Canadian crime film starring Wes Bentley, Christian Slater and Emmanuelle Vaugier. It is based on a novella of the same name by Stephen King.

== Plot ==
Middle school history teacher Tom Robinson lives in Las Vegas with his beloved wife, Elizabeth. On a horse riding trip out in the desert one day, Elizabeth comes across a human trafficking deal gone bad, with gangster Jimmy Dolan executing the two coyotes and one of the illegal aliens. Elizabeth is seen, however, and narrowly escapes Dolan's thugs firing at her. She drops her phone, which the thugs find and use to identify her. Soon afterward, a corpse with its lips sewn shut is left in Elizabeth's home, a threat to keep her silent.

The Robinsons go to the authorities, and an official admits them into the Witness Protection Program. Elizabeth awakens one night, needing to vomit, which she takes as a positive sign that she is pregnant. Excited, she rushes out of their hotel to buy pregnancy tests, with Tom following her. When she tries to start their car, it explodes, killing her as Tom watches, stunned.

Devastated, Tom begins drinking and eventually decides to seek revenge against Dolan. He purchases a handgun, a massive Smith & Wesson Model 500, and follows Dolan around town, eventually going after him one night. But before he can take the shot, a rival business of Dolan's pulls a drive-by, which fails because Dolan's Cadillac is revealed to be bulletproof.

Robinson continues to follow Dolan, who soon notices and learns his identity. The two meet at a rest stop in the Nevada desert, ending with a confrontation in which Dolan allows Robinson to live (albeit beaten up), believing life to be more painful for Robinson than death.

Undeterred, Robinson gets a job with a construction crew working on the roads that Dolan often travels. After strenuous preparation, Robinson sets his trap: a giant hole deep in the road, large enough to trap a car but not so large as to allow Dolan to escape by opening the doors. When Dolan's car falls into the hole, his driver, Delta, is killed, and his main henchman, Chief, is injured. Dolan shoots him out of annoyance, as both his legs were broken and he constantly screamed in agony.

Once Dolan has been trapped, Robinson makes his presence known, telling Dolan that he is a motorist who witnessed what had happened. Dolan, however, eventually realizes that the motorist is, in fact, Robinson, and begins to beg Robinson to let him go. Robinson begins to fill up the hole with dirt, continuing to taunt Dolan with possibilities of his escape, none of which come to fruition.

The official from the Witness Protection program soon calls Robinson to tell him that Dolan had been on his way to a major transaction involving child sex trafficking, a crime that would have destroyed Dolan. Robinson does not care, however, and finishes filling the hole up. Robinson lays concrete blocks over the Cadillac, while Dolan screams from within the hole.

The official calls back and tells Robinson they now have enough for a conviction. Robinson drops the phone and laughs maniacally.

== Cast ==
- Wes Bentley as Tom Robinson
- Christian Slater as Jimmy Dolan
- Emmanuelle Vaugier as Elizabeth Robinson
- Greg Bryk as Chief
- Aidan Devine as Roman
- Al Sapienza as Fletcher
- Karen LeBlanc as Delta
- Cory Generoux as Pedro
- Vivian Ng as Jun Li
- Patrick Bird as Jose
- Eugene Clark as Tink
- Max Keene as Danny
- Robert Benz as Sheriff Bob
- Timothy Allen as Marshall
- Amy Matysio as Amy
- Tony Munch as Blocker
- Darla Biccum as Reba
- Charlie Needemiar as Construction Worker

== Production ==
Japanese singer Crystal Kay sings "Hold On", which is played during the film's end credits.

== Release ==
The film was released as a direct-to-video production on April 6, 2010. It came out on DVD and Blu-ray Disc.
