= Head Down (essay) =

- Short story by Stephen King
- Country: United States
- Language: English

Publication
- Published in: The New Yorker (1st release), Nightmares & Dreamscapes
- Publication type: Magazine
- Media type: Print (Paperback)
- Publication date: April 16, 1990 (first publication)

"Head Down" is a non-fiction essay by Stephen King that first appeared in The New Yorker in the April 16, 1990 issue and was later republished as part of his 1993 short story collection, Nightmares & Dreamscapes. It also pairs with another work in that collection, Brooklyn August.

== Plot ==
The essay chronicles the 1989 season for his son Owen's Little League baseball team, Bangor West. He takes the reader through the ups and downs of the season, giving details of every game, as well as practice sessions and time on the road while focusing on the reactions of the players and the coaches. This builds to the team winning a hard-fought victory in the final game of the tournament to become the Maine State Champions. The team then goes forward to the Eastern Regional Tournament, only to be beaten in the second round. However, the story ends on a high note as the team coach, Dave Mansfield, is honored as amateur coach of the year by the United States Baseball Federation. The team also featured eventual Major League Baseball pitcher Matt Kinney.
