= Baa Baa, Black Sheep (short story) =

1888 semi-autobiographical short story by Rudyard Kipling

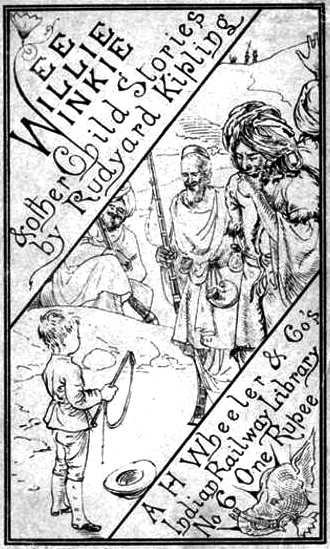
Scan of cover for Kipling. Wee Willie Winkie, and other stories

"Baa Baa, Black Sheep" is a semi-autobiographical short story by Rudyard Kipling, published in 1888.

The story deals with the unkind treatment that Kipling received between the ages of 6 and 11 in a foster home in Southsea. This subject is also discussed in the novel The Light That Failed published in 1890, and occupies most of the first chapter of his autobiography Something of Myself published in 1937.

Kipling and his younger sister are named Punch and Judy in this story. Following established custom for English families living in India, the Kipling parents sent their children to stay in England (in this case, in a foster home) for several years. Judy was treated warmly, but Punch was miserably abused and driven to a point of murderous and suicidal desperation. He also became nearly blind at this time.

== Adaptations ==
The story has been dramatized on film in the following teleplays:

- In 1960 as The Black Sheep, an episode of the TV anthology series Shirley Temple's Storybook.
- In 1974 as a TV movie Baa Baa Black Sheep directed by Mike Newell, which aired on ITV in the UK and on PBS three years later in the U.S.

In 1993 it was used as the basis of an opera, with a libretto by the Australian novelist David Malouf and music by English composer Michael Berkeley.

== Sources ==
Radcliffe, John; McGivering, John (2004). "Readers Guide to 'Baa Baa, Black Sheep'". kiplingsociety.co.uk. Archived from the original on 2026-02-18.
