= Dedication (short story) =

- Short story by Stephen King
- Country: United States
- Language: English
- Genre: Fantasy short story

Publication
- Published in: Dark Visions (1st release), Nightmares & Dreamscapes
- Publication type: Anthology
- Publisher: Orion Publishing
- Media type: Print (Paperback)
- Publication date: 1988

"Dedication" is a short story by Stephen King first published as part of the 1988 short story anthology Dark Visions and reprinted in King's 1993 short story collection Nightmares & Dreamscapes.

== Plot summary ==
Hotel housekeeper Martha Rosewall shows her friend Darcy a novel published by her son Peter, which has a dedication that says he could not have done it without her help. Martha goes on to tell the curious Darcy exactly why this sentiment is true.

Many years earlier, a young Martha (pregnant with her husband Johnny's child) visits a bruja named Mama Delorme, who tells her to find the child's "natural father." Martha eventually decides that this "natural father" is Peter Jefferies, a prejudiced writer who often visits the hotel where she works. Martha consumes some of Jefferies' semen, which was left on his sheets, as part of what is implied to be a black magic spell orchestrated by Mama Delorme to pass on Jefferies' writing prowess to her unborn son. Mama Delorme also helps Martha with the problem of her abusive husband, giving her a mushroom that Martha squeezes onto Johnny's gun, which later explodes in his face and kills him during an attempted robbery.

Back in the present, Martha muses on the similarities between her son's novel and a novel published by Jefferies. She also shows Darcy the signatures and handwriting on her copies of both books, which are virtually identical.

King's notes at the end of Nightmares & Dreamscapes state that this story turned out to be a sort of trial for his later novel Dolores Claiborne, and that it was partly written to explore the idea of why famous and talented people can sometimes be horrible in real life. In addition, a fellow housemaid of Martha's in "Dedication" is named Delores.

== Film, TV or theatrical adaptations ==
This story has been adapted into short films twice under King's "Dollar Baby" program (allowing non-commercial adaptations of certain short stories for a US$1 license fee), both directed by female filmmakers. In 2017, Tyna Ezenma made the first Dollar Baby of this story, something of a novelty as many stories on the list already had dozens of such adaptations. Selina Sondermann adapted the story in the following year and set it in 2018 Berlin. Sondermann‘s Dedication won a number of awards, was selected as the opening film for 2021 Stephen King Rules online Festival and screened 2025 at the Academy Museum.

The audiobook is read by actor Lindsay Crouse.

== See also ==
- Stephen King short fiction bibliography
