= Dolan's Cadillac (novella) =

Novella by Stephen King

- Author: Stephen King
- Language: English
- Genre: crime, thriller, novella
- Published in: Castle Rock, Nightmares & Dreamscapes
- Publisher: Viking
- Publication date: 1985
- Media type: Print (Hardcover)

"Dolan's Cadillac" is a novella by Stephen King. It was originally published in Castle Rock, King's official newsletter, in monthly installments from February to June 1985. In 1993, "Dolan's Cadillac" was collected in Nightmares & Dreamscapes. The story is narrated by the protagonist, a schoolteacher, and there is only one other main character, Dolan.

== Plot ==
Robinson, the narrator, is a schoolteacher who lives in Las Vegas. He has become a widower after Dolan, a wealthy crime-boss, had his wife murdered with a car bomb in order to prevent her from testifying against him. The murder remains unsolved, and Robinson, unskilled in the arts of revenge, has no recourse. Over a seven-year period, however, Robinson—mentally haunted by his wife's voice—devises a scheme of retaliation.

Discovering that Dolan regularly takes the same route along State Route 71 when traveling to Los Angeles while in his Cadillac, Robinson decides to trick Dolan into missing a detour on his usual route and bury him in the car. Nothing else would even have a chance of working, as Dolan's Cadillac is too well-armored against conventional threats, and Dolan himself is an intensely vigilant man. Robinson takes on an arduous summer job with a road paving crew so that he can learn to operate the heavy equipment needed to excavate an oblong ditch just long and deep enough to contain the car, but not so wide as to allow escape through its doors.

Circumstances align to ensure that a road work that Robinson can use will be occurring on an occasion that Dolan will be travelling along the highway over a Fourth of July holiday weekend, ensuring that Robinson can prepare the trap without fear of interruption, though the physical effort and mental strain of doing so single-handedly proves agonising to Robinson. On the night the plan is attempted, however, Robinson's trap works flawlessly, and Dolan's Cadillac drops into the pit as the altered section of road collapses under its weight. One of Dolan's bodyguards is killed in the crash, while the other, crushed by the engine block, screams out in agony and panic, prompting Dolan to kill him. Robinson greets him and announces his intent on burying Dolan alive. Dolan addresses Robinson by name, luring Robinson to lean closer, narrowly missing as he fires a few bullets skyward. Robinson proceeds with the burial.

Dolan attempts to reason, negotiate, and finally plead for his freedom, gradually becoming less coherent as the sound of dirt cascading over the Cadillac's roof erodes his sanity. Robinson takes no interest in any of Dolan's offers, but does offer one of his own, promising to release Dolan if he can scream as loud as the explosives that killed Robinson's wife. None of Dolan's attempts are judged sufficient, and Robinson delightedly listens as Dolan's mind crumbles. With what must be the last gasp of air left to him, Dolan screams out, "For the love of God, Robinson!" as the latter drops the last piece of paving into place.

The strain of his efforts takes a physical and mental toll on Robinson, causing him to collapse with exhaustion and a severely injured back. He manages to recover, never returning to roadwork, and a fortuitous sandstorm works to ensure that Dolan will remain hidden; his disappearance goes largely unmourned, and the press jokes that he is "playing dominos or shooting pool somewhere with Jimmy Hoffa."

Robinson muses that one day, the sinkhole created by the buried Cadillac will cause the road above it to collapse, risking its discovery; however, the specifications Dolan ordered to protect himself will ironically ensure that this will not occur for a long while, and it may even just be covered over again. He notes that he occasionally drove along the same highway, and on the final occasion urinated on the spot where he believed Dolan was buried, but has since taken to driving an alternate route. He concludes by revealing that his wife's voice no longer haunts him, which he finds a relief, but that he has occasionally glimpsed visions of Dolan's emaciated corpse.

== Adaptations ==
The 2008 film version of "Dolan's Cadillac" was directed by Jeff Beesley, scripted by Richard Dooling and starred Christian Slater as Dolan, Wes Bentley as Robinson, and Emmanuelle Vaugier as Robinson's wife. The film was shot in Regina and Moose Jaw. J-pop idol Crystal Kay performed its theme song, "Hold On".

The audiobook version of this story was narrated by actor Rob Lowe.

== Influences ==
- The line "For the love of God, Robinson!" is a direct reference to "For the love of God, Montresor!" from "The Cask of Amontillado" by Edgar Allan Poe. Dolan's Cadillac holds many ties to "The Cask of Amontillado," chiefly in Robinson's burial of Dolan.

== See also ==
- Stephen King short fiction bibliography
