= Greg Nicotero =

American special make-up effects artist

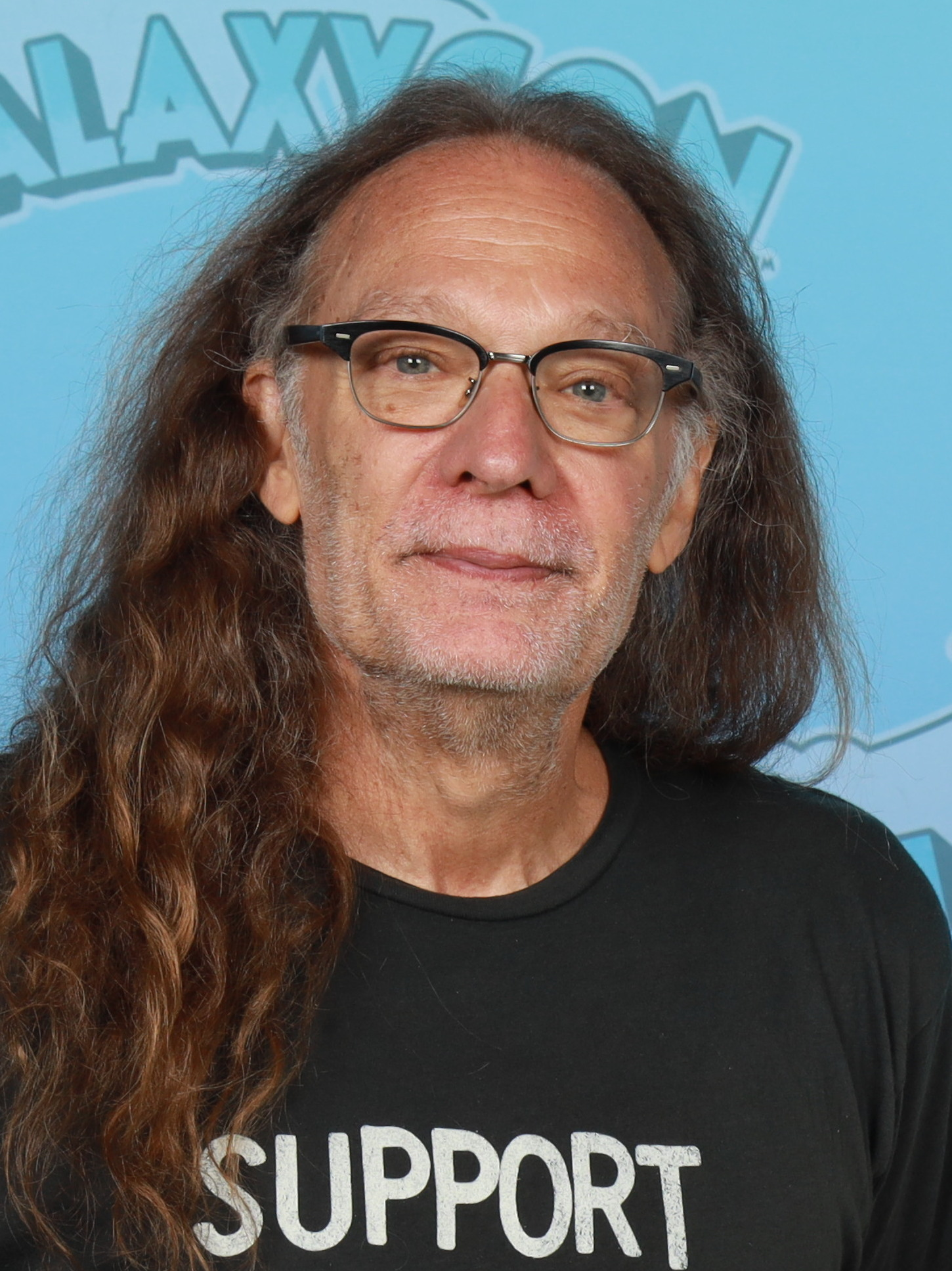
- Nicotero at GalaxyCon New Orleans in 2025
- Born: Gregory Nicotero; March 15, 1963 (age 63); Pittsburgh, Pennsylvania, U.S.
- Occupations: Director; SFX Artist; Producer
- Years active: 1985–present
- Known for: The Walking Dead
- Relatives: Frank Nicotero (cousin)

Gregory Nicotero (born March 15, 1963) is an American special make-up effects creator, television producer, and director. His first major job in special effects makeup was on the George A. Romero film Day of the Dead (1985), under the tutelage of Romero and make-up effects veteran Tom Savini.

In 1988, along with Robert Kurtzman and Howard Berger, he formed KNB EFX Group, a special make-up effects studio which has gone on to work on over 400 film and television projects. KNB has won numerous awards, including an Emmy Award in 2001 for their work on the 2000 Sci Fi Channel miniseries Frank Herbert's Dune and an Academy Award in 2006 for achievement in makeup for The Chronicles of Narnia: The Lion, the Witch and the Wardrobe.

He served as a senior producer/executive producer, special make-up effects supervisor, and primary director on the AMC TV series The Walking Dead and Fear the Walking Dead. Nicotero has directed 37 episodes of The Walking Dead and is the creator of the webseries The Walking Dead: Webisodes.

== Life and career ==
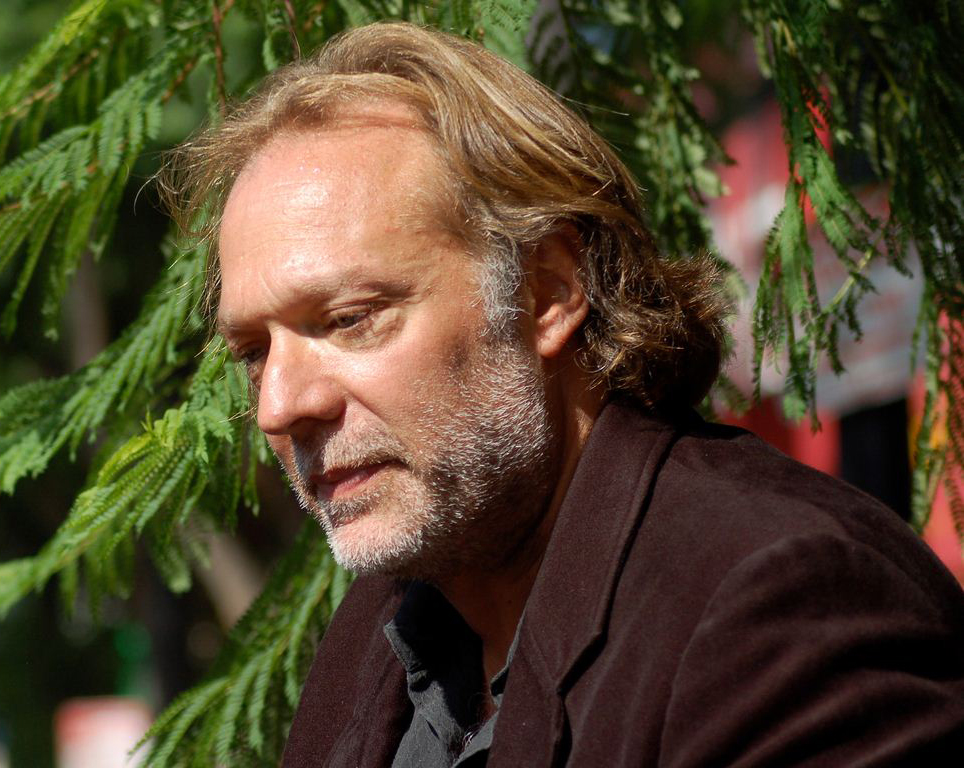
Nicotero in October 2012.

Nicotero claims he began taking an interest in special effects after viewing the film Jaws. He explains: "I kept thinking 'How the hell did they do that?! How'd they build a big giant shark that could eat people?!' So, between that movie, The Exorcist, Planet of the Apes, and of course all of the Universal horror movies [...] I think Jaws and then later Dawn of the Dead were pretty much the two movies that did it for me." Nicotero began his career working in Pittsburgh, Pennsylvania, learning the trade of special make-up effects, also known as prosthetic makeup, from Tom Savini, an award-winning special effects and makeup artist, and helping on films by director George A. Romero.

While working on the 1985 Romero film Day of the Dead, he met Howard Berger, who would become one of his partners at KNB EFX Group. Nicotero relocated to Hollywood and moved in with Berger and Robert Kurtzman.

He later worked as FX artist on the 2010 film Predators and created a classic predator figure for the film.

Nicotero worked as special make-up effects supervisor, co-executive producer and occasional director for the TV series The Walking Dead, as well as acting in a few uncredited cameos. He was at San Diego Comic-Con for the show. He was a guest on Talking Dead on March 24, 2013, October 12, 2014, February 8, 2015, and February 14, 2016. He also supervises the make-up effects for Fear the Walking Dead.

In 2011, Nicotero was interviewed for the 2012 zombie special effects book "Blood Splatter: A Guide to Cinematic Zombie Violence, Gore and Special Effects" by author Craig W. Chenery.

He was a guest on the MythBusters Zombie Special on October 17, 2013.

He designed a Leatherface skin for the 2023 game The Texas Chain Saw Massacre that bears his name, known as "Nicotero Leatherface". It was released October 24, 2023.

In 2025, Nicotero developed and hosted the reality television show Guts & Glory on Shudder.

== Filmography ==
Film performances
Year	Title	Notes
1985	Day of the Dead	Special makeup effects artist
1985	Invasion U.S.A.	Additional special effects makeup
1987	Creepshow 2	Special effects
1987	Predator	Creature effects crew (uncredited)
1987	Evil Dead II	Special makeup effects unit crew
1988	Phantasm II	Special makeup effects constructor and special effects crew
1988	Monkey Shines	Special Makeup Effects Artist
1989	The Horror Show	Special effects
1989	Intruder	Special Makeup Effects Artist
1989	DeepStar Six	Creature supervisor
1989	Halloween 5: The Revenge of Michael Myers	Special effects supervisor
1990	Leatherface: The Texas Chainsaw Massacre III	Makeup artist
1990	Tales from the Darkside: The Movie	Special makeup effects supervisor
1990	Bride of Re-Animator	Special makeup effects artist
1990	Misery	Special makeup effects artist
1990	Dances with Wolves	Buffalo effects supervisor
1991	The People Under the Stairs	Special makeup effects supervisor
1992	Army of Darkness	Special makeup effects
1993	Body Bags (TV film)	Special makeup effects
1993	Jason Goes to Hell: The Final Friday	Effects supervisor and special makeup effects artist
1993	Doppelganger	Special makeup effects
1994	Pumpkinhead II: Blood Wings	Special makeup effects supervisor
1994	Pulp Fiction	Special makeup supervisor (uncredited)
1994	Wes Craven's New Nightmare	Special makeup effects
1995	Vampire in Brooklyn	Special makeup effects: puppeteer
1995	In the Mouth of Madness	Special makeup effects
1995	Lord of Illusions	Special makeup effects supervisor
1996	Eraser	Animatronic crocodiles supervisor
1996	From Dusk till Dawn	Makeup effects supervisor
1996	Scream	Special makeup effects supervisor
1996	Jingle All the Way	Turboman costume and special makeup effects
1996	Black Sheep	Puppeteer
1997	Spawn	Animatronic creature and special makeup effects
1997	Boogie Nights	Special makeup effects supervisor
1997	Wishmaster	Special makeup effects
1997	Scream 2	Special makeup effects supervisor
1998	Vampires	Special makeup effects
1998	Very Bad Things	Supervisor
1998	The Faculty	Special makeup and creature effects
1999	The Green Mile	Special makeup effects supervisor
1999	The Haunting	Special makeup effects supervisor
1999	House on Haunted Hill	Special makeup effects
2000	Little Nicky	Special makeup and creature effects supervisor
2000	Frank Herbert's Dune (TV miniseries)	Lead special effects supervisor
2000	The Cell	Prosthetics and special makeup effects supervisor
2000	Unbreakable	Special makeup effects supervisor
2001	Spy Kids	Makeup effects supervisor and creature effects
2001	The Animal	Special makeup effects artist
2001	Mulholland Drive	Special makeup effects artist
2001	Ghosts of Mars	Special makeup effects artist
2001	Thirteen Ghosts	Special makeup effects artist and supervisor
2001	Vanilla Sky	Special makeup effects supervisor
2001	Evolution	Supervisor
2002	The Time Machine	Supervisor
2002	Minority Report	Special makeup effects artist (uncredited)
2002	Austin Powers in Goldmember	Character prosthetics supervisor Special makeup effects artist
2002	Vampires: Los Muertos	Special makeup effects supervisor
2002	The Rules of Attraction	Special makeup effects artist
2002	Murder by Numbers	Supervisor
2002	Bubba Ho-tep	Special effects makeup supervisor
2003	Cabin Fever	Special makeup effects supervisor
2003	Hulk	Animatronics effects supervisor/puppeteer
2003	Spy Kids 3-D: Game Over	Special effects makeup
2003	The Texas Chainsaw Massacre	Special effects makeup
2003	Identity	Special makeup effects supervisor
2003	Once Upon a Time in Mexico	Special makeup effects supervisor
2003	Kill Bill: Volume 1	Special effects makeup supervisor
2004	Kill Bill: Volume 2	Special makeup supervisor
2004	Ginger Snaps 2: Unleashed	Special makeup effects
2004	Riding the Bullet	Special makeup effects supervisor
2004	Ray	Special makeup effects supervisor
2004	Lemony Snicket's A Series of Unfortunate Events	Special effects supervisor
2005	Dominion: Prequel to the Exorcist	Special makeup effects designer
2005–2007	Masters of Horror (TV series)	Special makeup effects artist
2005	Cursed	Additional special makeup effects supervisor Additional werewolf effects creator
2005	Sin City	Special makeup effects supervisor
2005	The Amityville Horror	Special makeup effects artist, designer and creator
2005	The Adventures of Sharkboy and Lavagirl in 3-D	Special makeup effects artist
2005	Land of the Dead	Special makeup effects supervisor
2005	The Island	Project supervisor
2005	Serenity	Special effects makeup supervisor
2005	Hostel	Special makeup effects designer and creator
2005	The Chronicles of Narnia: The Lion, the Witch and the Wardrobe	Special makeup and creatures
2006	The Hills Have Eyes	Special makeup effects designer
2006	Poseidon	Makeup effects supervisor
2006	Desperation (TV film)	Special makeup effects supervisor
2006	Casino Royale	Effects supervisor
2006	The Texas Chainsaw Massacre: The Beginning	Special makeup supervisor
2006	The Return	Special effects makeup
2006	Comedy Hell	Special makeup designer
2006	Dead and Deader	Additional special makeup effects
2007	Death Proof	Special makeup effects
2007	The Hills Have Eyes 2	Special makeup effects designer
2007	Hostel: Part II	Special makeup effects designer and creator
2007	The Reaping	Supervisor: K.N.B. EFX Group, Inc.
2007	Spider-Man 3	Special effects makeup
2007	Disturbia	Special makeup effects supervisor
2007	Grindhouse	Special makeup effects artist
2007	Transformers	Animatronics supervisor/puppeteer
2007	Underdog	Supervisor
2007	Diary of the Dead	Special effects makeup producer
2007	The Mist	Creature effects
2008	Fear Itself	Special makeup effects artist
2008	Mirrors	Special makeup effects designer
2010	The Book of Eli	Special makeup effects
2010	Edge of Darkness	Special makeup effects
2010	Predators	Special makeup and creature effects
2010	The Pacific (TV miniseries)	Key special makeup effects supervisor (6 episodes)
2010–2022	The Walking Dead (TV series)	Special makeup effects
2010	Piranha 3D	Key special makeup effects supervisor
2010	The Ward	Makeup effects
2010	The United Monster Talent Agency (short film)	Special makeup effects
2011	The Boy Who Cried Werewolf (TV film)	Special makeup and creature effects
2011	Paul	Special makeup effects artist (uncredited)
2011	I Am Number Four	Special makeup creator/designer
2011	Water for Elephants	Key special makeup effects supervisor (uncredited)
2011–2012	Breaking Bad (TV series)	Special makeup effects (2 episodes)
2011	A Very Harold & Kumar 3D Christmas	Key special makeup effects supervisor
2012	The Grey	Special makeup effects
2012	The Odd Life of Timothy Green	Key special makeup effects supervisor
2012	Seven Psychopaths	Special make-up effects
2012	The Man with the Iron Fists	Special make-up effects
2013	Oz the Great and Powerful	Special make-up effects
2013	The Green Inferno	Special makeup effects artist
2013	Lone Survivor	Special make-up effects
2014	Transformers: Age of Extinction	Special effects makeup supervisor
2015	Fear The Walking Dead	Special make-up effects
2015	The Hateful Eight	Special make-up effects
2016	Suicide Squad	Special make-up effects
2019	Once Upon a Time in Hollywood	Makeup effects designer and supervisor
2027	Twilight of the Dead	Special make-up effects

=== Actor ===
- The Walking Dead
  - 1.3 "Tell It to the Frogs" (uncredited) as Walker Eating Deer
  - 1.4 "Vatos" (uncredited) as Walker biting Amy
  - 3.9 "The Suicide King" (uncredited) as Walker in Woodbury
  - 6.3 "Thank You" (uncredited) as Walker in herd
  - 11.24 "Rest in Peace" (uncredited) as Walker in final scene before epilogue
- Crystal Lake Memories: The Complete History of Friday the 13th (2013) (Documentary film) as Himself
- The Grey (2011) as Duke Chavis
- Piranha 3D (2010) as Boat Captain
- His Name Was Jason: 30 Years of Friday the 13th (2009) (Documentary film) as Himself
- Inglourious Basterds (2009) (uncredited) as Gestapo Major
- Gingerdead Man 2: Passion of the Crust (2008) as Makeup Effects Guy #3
- Diary of the Dead (2008) as Zombie Surgeon
- Cemetery Gates (2006) as Stoner Dude Michael
- The Hills Have Eyes (2006) as Cyst
- Land of the Dead (2005) as Bridgekeeper Zombie
- Cursed (2005) (uncredited) as Man pushing Dracula's coffin
- House on Haunted Hill (1999) (uncredited) as Rollercoaster technician
- From Dusk till Dawn (1996) as Sex Machine's Buddy
- The Demolitionist (1995) as Elevator Punk
- Body Bags (1993) (TV) as Man with Dog
- Intruder (1989) as Townie in Car
- Halloween 4: The Return of Michael Myers (1988) (uncredited) as Guy in Gas Station
- Night of the Creeps (1986) (uncredited) as Extra
- Day of the Dead (1985) as Johnson

=== Director ===
- The Walking Dead: Daryl Dixon (2024)
  - 2.01 "La Gentillesse des Étrangers"
- The Walking Dead (2011–2022) (37 episodes)
  - 2.11 "Judge, Jury, Executioner"
  - 3.05 "Say the Word"
  - 3.11 "I Ain't a Judas"
  - 3.15 "This Sorrowful Life"
  - 4.01 "30 Days Without an Accident"
  - 4.09 "After"
  - 4.15 "Us"
  - 5.01 "No Sanctuary"
  - 5.09 "What Happened and What's Going On"
  - 5.12 "Remember"
  - 5.16 "Conquer"
  - 6.01 "First Time Again"
  - 6.09 "No Way Out"
  - 6.12 "Not Tomorrow Yet"
  - 6.16 "Last Day on Earth"
  - 7.01 "The Day Will Come When You Won't Be"
  - 7.02 "The Well"
  - 7.09 "Rock in the Road"
  - 7.12 "Say Yes"
  - 7.16 "The First Day of the Rest of Your Life"
  - 8.01 "Mercy"
  - 8.03 "Monsters"
  - 8.09 "Honor"
  - 8.12 "The Key"
  - 8.16 "Wrath"
  - 9.01 "A New Beginning"
  - 9.05 "What Comes After"
  - 9.09 "Adaptation"
  - 9.16 "The Storm"
  - 10.01 "Lines We Cross"
  - 10.02 "We Are the End of the World"
  - 10.12 "Walk with Us"
  - 10.16 "A Certain Doom"
  - 11.05 "Out of the Ashes"
  - 11.06 "On the Inside"
  - 11.17 "Lockdown"
  - 11.24 "Rest in Peace"
- The Walking Dead: The Oath (2013) (3 webisodes)
- The Walking Dead: Cold Storage (2012) (4 webisodes)
- The Walking Dead: Torn Apart (2011) (6 webisodes)
- The United Monster Talent Agency (2010) (short film)
