= Klown (disambiguation) =

Klown may refer to:

- The 2010 Danish comedy film Klown
- An accidental or stylish misspelling of clown, a comedic performer
- Krusty the Klown, a character from TV series The Simpsons
- Klowning, a form of spiritual 'evolution' promoted by Kenja, an Australian cult
- Klown (creature), alien clowns featured in the films Killer Klowns from Outer Space and Return of the Killer Klowns from Outer Space in 3D
- Klown Kamp Massacre, a 2010 film in which a serial murderer begins killing his fellow camp members.
