= Ross Kelly (actor) =

American actor

- Born: Vancouver, Canada
- Occupation: Actor
- Years active: 2005–present

Ross Kelly is an actor and writer who has had lead roles and co-starring in various films. A good portion of them are horror films which include The Stink of Flesh in 2005, Pretty Dead Things and Wedding Slashers in 2006, Army of the Dead in 2008 and Romeo & Juliet vs. The Living Dead in 2009. He has also had roles in The War Boys, Love N' Dancing, Trade and Save Me.

== Career ==
Kelly's career in film began around 2005.

In the Richard Griffin directed vampire comedy Pretty Dead Things, he played the part of Rex Van Horn, a vampire hunter who for the most part, looks out for himself. The film was released in 2006. The same year Wedding Slashers was released. The film was directed by Carlos Scott. Kelly played the male lead in the film, playing the part of Alex who gets engaged to Jenna (played by Jessica Kinney). When they get engaged, people mysteriously start to die. The film also starred Richard Lynch. The following year he appeared in Save Me, and co-starred in The Donor Conspiracy. The film was about a couple of larrakin medical students who after getting expelled for playing a prank on their dean, unwittingly get mixed up underworld organ harvesting ring.

He had the lead role in the Joseph Conti directed horror Army of the Dead which was released in 2008. The film also featured Stefani Marchesi, Miguel Martinez, Vic Browder and Mike Hatfield. Both Kelly and Hatfield had previously appeared as law enforcement officers in Trade. He played the part of John who was married to Amy. He and his wife were among friends who were in the Baja Desert to have some fun racing. Things don't go to plan as the professor who is with them has an agenda of his own which leads to the stirring up of an ancient curse and them being chased by an army of skeletons.

In the 2011 Klown Kamp Massacre, Kelly played Philbert, the typical goofy clown. His character was probably the most prominent among them. In 2013, he played a Vegas cop in The Last Stand which was directed by Kim Jee-woon.

He produced a made-for-television film Untitled Pajama Men Project which was released in 2016.

== Filmography ==
Film
Title	Role	Director	Year	Notes #
The Stink of Flesh	Nathan	Scott Phillips	2005	
Lady Liberty	Chris	Azad Jafarian	2005	Short
Stare Down	Ron	Joshua Powell	2005	Short
Dog Day	Joe	Joachim Jung	2006	Short
Pretty Dead Things	Rex Van Horn	Richard Griffin	2006	
Wedding Slashers	Alex	Carlos Scott	2006	
Save Me	Adam	Robert Cary	2008	
Trade	Adam	Marco Kreuzpaintner	2007	
The Donor Conspiracy	Gavin	Ryil Adamson	2007	
The Dream Girl	Jim	Joachim Jung	2007	Short
Time Cougars	Tad	Reuben Finkelstein	2007	Short; Also writer
Army of the Dead	John Barnes	Joseph Conti	2008	
Love N' Dancing	Terry	Robert Iscove	2009	
The War Boys	Agent Burrows	Ronald Daniels	2009	
Romeo & Juliet vs. The Living Dead	Paris	Ryan Denmark	2009	
M v. W	Man	Dominic Garcia	2009	Short
Klown Kamp Massacre	Philbert	Philip H. R. Gunn; David Valdez	2010	
The Double	Movie Star	Tantri Wija	2010	Short
The Last Stand	Vegas Check Point Cop	Kim Jee-woon	2011	

Television
Title	Episode #	Role	Director	Year	Notes #
Wildfire	Guilty	Wayne	Nick Marck	2005	
Wildfire	The Claiming Race	Wayne		2005	
Crash	Master of Puppets	Randy	Peter Markle	2009	
Date Doctor TV	Hot Potato	Dan		2010	
Date Doctor TV	Popcorn	Dan		2010	
Date Doctor TV	Blue Bug	Dan		2010	
Date Doctor TV	Digging	Dan		2010	
Date Doctor TV	Don't Be Shy	Dan		2010	
Date Doctor TV	Games	Dan		2010	
Date Doctor TV	Head Over Heels	Dan		2010	
Date Doctor TV	Missing Ingredients	Dan		2010	
Date Doctor TV	Sour	Dan		2010	
Date Doctor TV	Stacy	Dan		2010	
Date Doctor TV	Sweet	Dan		2010	
Date Doctor TV	The Mailbox	Dan		2010	
Date Doctor TV	Batteries Not Included	Dan		2010	
In Plain Sight	Love in the Time of Colorado	Teddy	Michael Schultz	2011	
Overlook, NM	Public Response to Matters Before Council	Teddy	Willis S. Davidson; Josh Klein	2013	
