= Robert Kurtzman =

American film producer (born 1964)

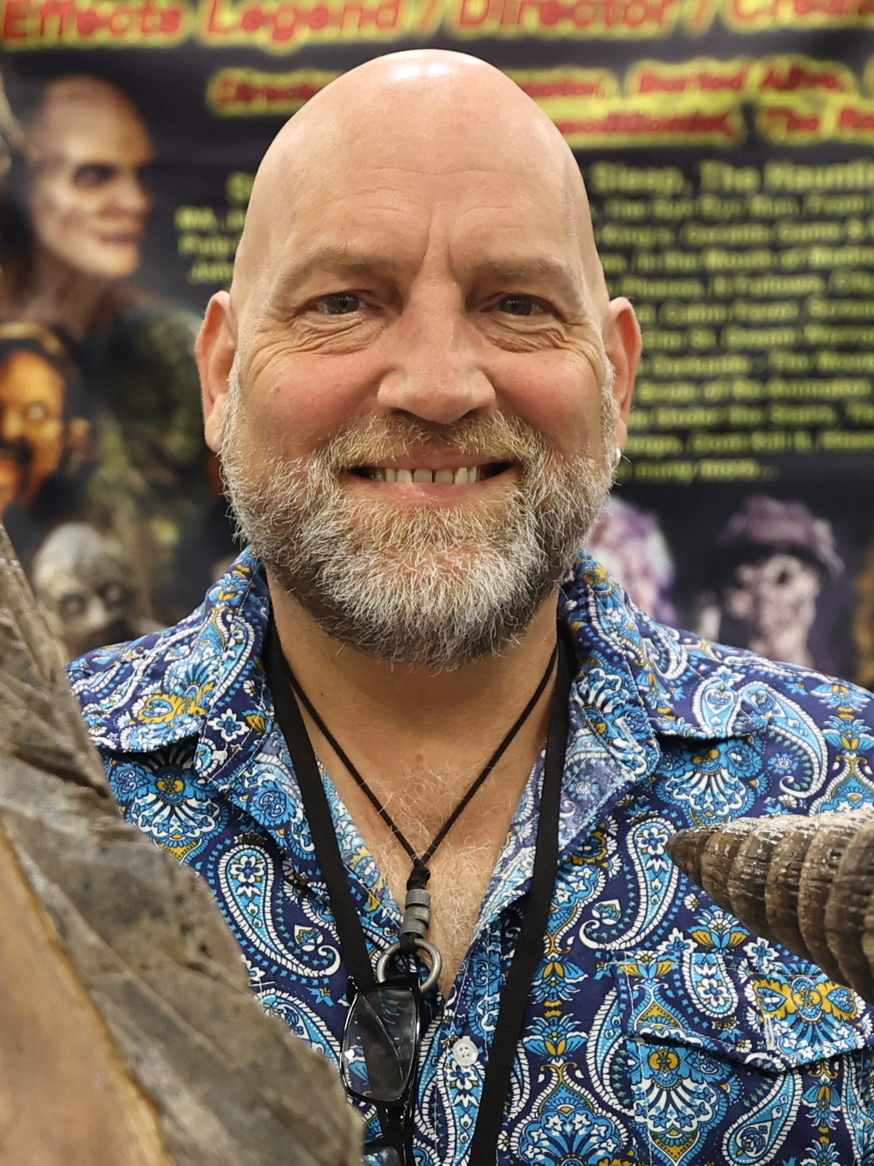
- Kurtzman at GalaxyCon Columbus in 2023
- Born: November 25, 1964 (age 61); Crestline, Ohio, United States
- Occupations: Film director Film producer Screenwriter; Special make-up effects creator
- Spouse: Marcia "Marcy" King
- Children: Louie Kurtzman; Sadie Kurtzman
- Website: www.robertkurtzmanmufx.com

Robert Kurtzman (born November 25, 1964) is an American film director, producer, screenwriter, and special effects makeup artist. During his time at KNB EFX Group, which he co-founded, it would win a 2001 Emmy Award. He would then start his own production company Precinct 13 Entertainment in 2003 and Robert Kurtzman's Creature Corps. In 2017, Kurtzman and his partner Marcia King moved to Atlanta and formed Robert Kurtzman MUFX LLC.

== Career ==
Kurtzman began his career in 1984 when he moved from his hometown of Crestline, Ohio, to Hollywood, California, to pursue his interest in prosthetic makeup, better known as special makeup effects. In 1988, along with Gregory Nicotero and Howard Berger, he formed K.N.B. EFX Group, a special makeup effects studio which has gone on to work on over 400 film and television projects. K.N.B. has won numerous awards, including an Emmy Award in 2001 for their work on the 2000 Sci Fi Channel miniseries Frank Herbert's Dune. They were awarded an Academy Award in 2006 for achievement in makeup for The Chronicles of Narnia: The Lion, the Witch and the Wardrobe.

After establishing himself in the special effects arena, Kurtzman turned to directing and producing. His first project was From Dusk till Dawn, for which he wrote the original story, served as co-producer, and created the special effects. The Demolitionist marked Kurtzman's directorial debut. He went on to direct Wishmaster, in which he had an uncredited cameo as "piano wire guy". In 2002, Kurtzman left K.N.B. EFX Group. Kurtzman moved his family to Crestline, Ohio, and started his own production company, Precinct 13 Entertainment. Founded in 2003, Precinct 13 is described as a Film/Television and Radio Commercial/Visual Effects production facility. The Rage was the first in-house, fully financed, independent feature film. Kurtzman and P13 have, also, co-produced the supernatural film The Dead Matter, featuring Andrew Divoff, Tom Savini, and Jim O'Rear. Kurtzman also directed the action-thriller film Deadly Impact, which was written by Alexander Vesha. In 2017, Kurtzman took on the Makeup/ MUFX Co-Department Head position for the series The Haunting of Hill House directed by Mike Flanagan. Kurtzman moved his studio to Atlanta and formed Robert Kurtzman MUFX, LLC. His new company has worked on films such as Jay and Silent Bob Reboot, Ma and Doctor Sleep.

== Awards ==
Year	Nominee / work	Award	Result
1994	Makeup for Body Bags - shared with Rick Baker, Greg LaCava, Gregory Nicotero, Howard Berger	CableACE Awards	Nominated
1995	Makeup for State of Emergency - shared with Howard Berger, Gregory Nicotero, Ashlee Petersen, Heidi Seeholzer	CableACE Awards	Nominated
1997	Best Film for Wishmaster	Catalan International Film Festival	Nominated
1999	Best Makeup for Vampires - shared with Howard Berger and Gregory Nicotero	Academy of Science Fiction, Fantasy & Horror Films Saturn Award	Won
2002	Best Makeup for Cabin Fever - shared with Howard Berger and Gregory Nicotero	Sitges - Catalan International Film Festival	Won

== Filmography ==
=== 1980s ===
Year	Film	Role	Notes
1986	From Beyond	Effects Technician	
1986	Night of the Creeps	Special makeup effects	
1987	A Nightmare on Elm Street 3: Dream Warriors	Freddy's creature forms	
1987	Predator	Creature effects crew	
1987	Evil Dead II	Special makeup effects unit crew	
1988	Phantasm II	Special makeup effects constructor	
1988	976-EVIL	On-set makeup applicator	Kevin Yagher Production, Inc.
1989	Halloween 5: The Revenge of Michael Myers	On-set makeup applicator	Kevin Yagher Production, Inc.
1989	The Horror Show	Special effects	
1989	DeepStar Six	Creature guy	
1989	Night Angel	Additional makeup effects supervisor	K.N.B. EFX Group
1989	Nightwish	Special effects	
1989	Intruder	Special makeup effects artist	

=== 1990s ===
Year	Title	Role	Notes
1990	Dances with Wolves	Buffalo effects supervisor	
1990	Bride of Re-Animator	Special makeup effects and bride effects creator	K.N.B. EFX Group
1990	Tremors	Creature effects: art crew	
1990	The Exorcist III	Demon effects makeup	
1990	Darkman	Special effects makeup artist	
1990	Misery	Special makeup effects artist	
1990	Sibling Rivalry	Special makeup effects	
1990	Tales from the Darkside: The Movie	Special makeup effects supervisor	
1990	Leatherface: The Texas Chainsaw Massacre III	Makeup artist	
1991	The People Under the Stairs	Special makeup effects supervisor	
1992	Dr. Giggles	Special makeup effects supervisor	
1992	Army of Darkness	Special makeup effects supervisor	K.N.B. EFX Group
1992	The Nutt House	Special makeup effects	
1993	Jason Goes to Hell: The Final Friday	Special makeup effects artist	K.N.B. EFX Group
1993	Body Bags	Special makeup effects	
1993	Doppelganger	Special makeup effects	
1993	Maniac Cop 3	Special makeup effects supervisor	
1993	Ed and His Dead Mother	Special makeup effects	
1994	Wes Craven's New Nightmare	Special makeup effects	
1994	Pumpkinhead II: Blood Wings	Special makeup effects supervisor	
1994	In the Mouth of Madness	Special makeup effects	
1995	The Demolitionist	Director, screenwriter	
1995	Lord of Illusions	Special makeup effects supervisor	K.N.B. EFX Group
1995	Skinner	Special makeup effects artist, special effects supervisor	
1995	Vampire in Brooklyn	On-set special makeup effects application, special makeup effects: puppeteer	
1995	Galaxis	Special makeup effects supervisor	
1996	Scream	Special makeup effects supervisor	
1996	From Dusk till Dawn	Co-producer, story, makeup effects supervisor	
1997	The Night Flier	Special makeup effects supervisor	
1997	Double Tap	Special makeup effects supervisor	
1997	Spawn	Animatronic creature effects, special makeup effects	
1997	Wishmaster	Director, special makeup effects	
1998	The Faculty	Special makeup and creature effects	
1998	A Simple Plan	Special makeup effects supervisor/puppeteer	
1998	Vampires	Special makeup effects	
1998	Dean Koontz's Phantoms	Makeup effects supervisor	K.N.B. EFX Group
1999	House On Haunted Hill	Special makeup effects	

=== 2000s ===
Year	Title	Role	Notes
2000	The Crow: Salvation	Special makeup effects artist	
2000	Frank Herbert's Dune	Animatronic creature effects supervisor/puppeteer	
2000	Little Nicky	Special makeup and creature effects supervisor	
2000	Spiders	Special makeup and creature effects supervisor	
2001	My First Mister	Co-executive producer, special makeup effects artist	
2001	Vanilla Sky	Special makeup effects supervisor	K.N.B. EFX Group Inc.
2001	Thir13en Ghosts	Special makeup effects artist, special makeup effects supervisor	
2001	Ghosts of Mars	Special makeup effects artist	
2001	Soulkeeper	Special makeup and creature effects	
2001	Evolution	Creature effects	
2002	Vampires: Los Muertos	Special makeup effects supervisor	
2002	Bubba Ho-tep	Special makeup effects supervisor	
2002	Cabin Fever	Special makeup effects supervisor	
2002	Ghost Ship	Additional prosthetic special makeup effects supervisor artist/hairstylist	
2003	Bad Boys II	Special makeup effects artist (uncredited)	
2003	Identity	Special makeup effects supervisor	
2004	Tremors 4: The Legend Begins	Special effects supervisor	
2005	Cursed	Special makeup effects	
2005	Hostel	Visual effects supervisor	
2005	Jolly Roger: Massacre at Cutter's Cove	Visual effects supervisor	
2005	2001 Maniacs	Visual effects supervisor	
2005	The Devil's Rejects	Visual effects supervisor	
2006	The Texas Chainsaw Massacre: The Beginning	Special effects makeup	
2007	The Rage	Producer, director, writer, cinematographer, visual effects producer, special makeup effects producer	
2007	Buried Alive	Director, visual effects producer, special makeup effects producer, special effects director	
2007	Wanted: Undead or Alive	Special Makeup FX Producer/Visual effects producer	
2007	The Living Hell	Visual effects producer, special makeup effects producer	

=== 2010s ===
Year	Title	Role
2010	Deadly Impact	Director, special makeup producer, visual effects producer, actor (character: Homeowner)
2010	The Dead Matter	Producer
2013	Jug Face	Special makeup effects producer
2014	Tusk	Special effects makeup
2016	Lake Eerie	Special makeup effects artist, special effects supervisor
2016	The Funhouse Massacre	Special makeup effects producer
2016	The Neighbor	Special makeup effects supervisor
2017	The Bye Bye Man	Special makeup effects producer
2017	The Haunting of Hill House	Co-Makeup/Makeup Effects Department Head
2017	Gerald's Game	Makeup Effects Department Head
2019	Doctor Sleep	Makeup Effects Department Head

=== 2020s ===
Year	Title	Role
2021	Rise of The Living Dead	Special makeup effects artist
2021	Cherry	Makeup/Makeup Effects Department Head
2021	The Underground Railroad	Makeup artist (1 episode)
2021	Black Friday	Makeup and Special Effects Department Head
2021	Fear Street Part Two: 1978	Makeup Effects Artist
2022	First Kill	Makeup Effects Department Head
2022	Secret Headquarters	Makeup Effects Department Head
2022	The Last Days of Ptolemy Grey	Makeup Effects Department Head
2022	KillRoy Was Here	Special makeup effects artist
