= Dan Hicks (actor) =

American actor (1951–2020)

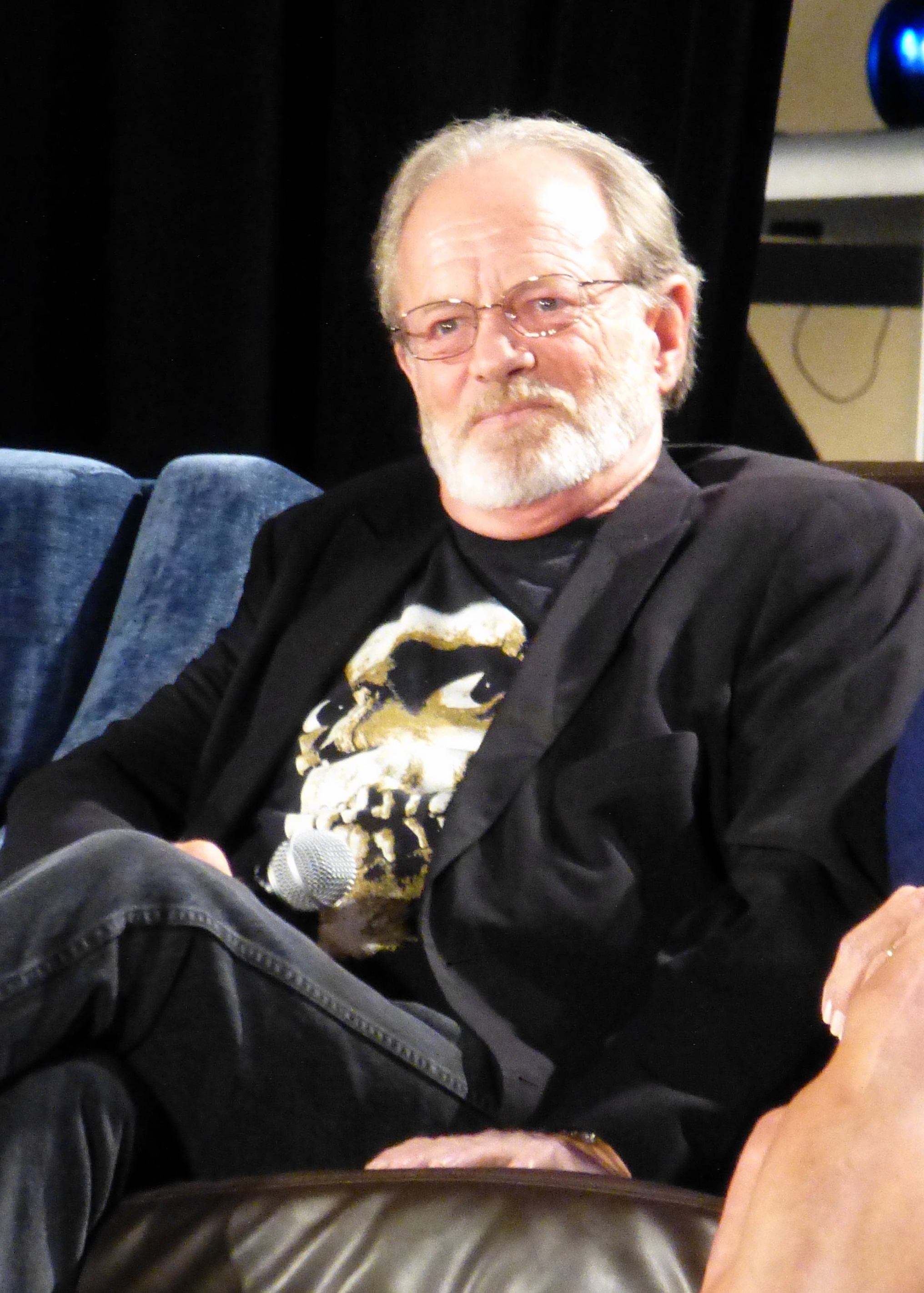
- Hicks in 2015
- Born: July 19, 1951; Pontiac, Michigan, U.S.
- Died: June 30, 2020 (aged 68); California, U.S.
- Other name: Danny Hicks
- Occupation: Actor

Dan Hicks (July 19, 1951 – June 30, 2020) was an American actor best known for starring roles in Evil Dead II, Darkman, and Intruder.

== Early life ==
Hicks was born in Pontiac, Michigan.

== Career ==
Hicks was best known for his collaborations with director Sam Raimi. Hicks' debut feature film was in Raimi's Evil Dead II in 1987.

They further collaborated with Hicks having supporting roles in Darkman and Intruder, and had minor roles in Spider-Man 2 and Oz: The Great and Powerful.

== Personal life ==
Hicks announced on June 5, 2020, that he had been diagnosed with stage 4 cancer, and given between one and three years to live.

== Death ==
He died on June 30, 2020, in his California home at age 68.

== Filmography ==
=== Film ===
Year	Title	Role	Notes
1987	Evil Dead II	Jake	
1988	Maniac Cop	Squad Leader	
1989	Intruder	Bill Roberts	
1989	Easy Wheels	Joe	
1990	Darkman	Skip Altwater	
1995	The Demolitionist	Krutchfield	
1997	Wishmaster	Customs Official	
2004	Spider-Man 2	Train Passenger #8	
2005	2001 Maniacs	Additional Maniac	
2007	My Name is Bruce	Dirt Farmer	
2007	Koreatown	The Stranger	Scenes deleted
2008	Alternate Endings	Hank	
2008	Tag	The Boss	Short
2009	Love Birds	Dan	
2009	Needle Hands	Donald	Short
2010	Porkchop	Elron	Voice
2011	For You	The Brother	Voice
2012	Dead Season	Lesh	
2012	Porkchop 3D	Elron	
2013	Oz the Great and Powerful	Emerald City Citizen	
2013	Fort Apache	Fireman	Short
2015	RvA	Daddy Hicks	Short
2016	Shelfie	Shelfie	Short
2016	Elder Island	Lucas Heidegger	
2018	Dick Johnson & Tommygun vs. The Cannibal Cop: Based on a True Story	Captain Phil Phillips	
2019	The Blood Hunter	Dick	

=== Television ===
Year	Title	Role	Notes
1993	Ultraman: The Ultimate Hero	Mr. Keins	Episode: "Monstrous Meltdown"
2010	Paranormal, Burbank	Lord Bastion	2 episodes
2011	Morbid Minutes	Man	Episode: "The Field"
2013	Ape$#!t	Skippy	Television short
2014	F.O.S.	Earl	Television short
