= Carmen Serano =

American actress

- Occupation: Actress
- Years active: 1999–present
- Spouse(s): Greg Serano (m. 1997; div. 2013) Terry Gingles Jr. (m. 2023)
- Children: 3

Carmen Serano is an American actress. She played Assistant Principal Carmen Molina in the television series Breaking Bad. She starred in the 2007 film Urban Justice alongside Steven Seagal, and Deadly Impact (2010).

== Personal life ==
She married actor Greg Serano in 1997. They lived with son Mark and daughters Cheyenne and Nya in California. Serano married Terry Gingles Jr. on February 4, 2023.

== Filmography ==
Film roles
Year	Title	Role	Notes
2000	Next Friday	Girl #1	
2000	King of the Jungle	Woman on Street	
2001	The Cross	Baptized Woman	
2007	Save Me	Anna	
2007	The Flock	Woman in Gorilla Suit	
2007	Urban Justice	Alice Park	Direct-to-Video
2007	American Dream	Victoria Garcia	Short film
2010	Deadly Impact	Isabel Ordonez	
2011	The Reunion	Angelina	
2017	Distortion	Lt. Gorman	

Television roles
Year	Title	Role	Notes
2008	In Plain Sight	Deaf Maid	Episode: "Pilot"
2008–2013	Breaking Bad	Carmen Molina	9 episodes
2009	Easy Money	Kathleen	Episode: "Bella Roma"
2009	In Plain Sight	Carmen Moreno	Episode: "Jailbait"
2010	Scoundrels	Alice Vargas	Episode: "Birds of a Feather Flock Together"
2011	Untitled Allan Loeb Project	Angel	TV Pilot
2014	Switched at Birth	Latina Merit Award Interviewer	Episode: "Oh, Future!"
2014	Chop Shop	Rosa La Osa	3 episodes
2017	The Comedy Get Down	Susana	Episode: "Black Wives Matter"
2017–2018	Marvel's Runaways	Alice Hernandez	2 episodes
