= Army of the Dead (2008 film) =

2008 film directed by Joe Conti

- Directed by: Joseph Conti
- Written by: Michael Ciccolini; Tom Woosley
- Produced by: Joseph Conti; Paul Conti; Fred Tepper
- Starring: Ross Kelly; Stephanie Marchese; Miguel Martinez
- Cinematography: John Grace
- Edited by: Richard Byard; Joseph Conti
- Music by: William T. Stromberg
- Production company: Contifilms
- Distributed by: Maverick Entertainment Group
- Release date: January 15, 2008 (US)
- Running time: 90 minutes
- Country: United States
- Language: English

Army of the Dead is a 2008 American horror film directed by Joseph Contegiacomo, also known as Joseph Conti. The film centers on a university professor and his students out on a fun race in the desert who become victims to an ancient curse. The film stars Ross Kelly, Stephanie Marchese, Miguel Martinez, Mike Hatfield, Vic Browder, Jocelyn Tucker, and Audrey Anderson.

== Plot ==
The film begins when four centuries ago, Coronado sent a thousand men to find the legendary lost city of gold, El Dorado. The men never returned.

In the present, a group of friends and their university professor go to the Baja desert to race against each other. They are assisted by their guide Fred Griffith (Mike Hatfield). An in-love married couple (Ross Kelly and Stefani Marchesi), John and Amy are among them. This race is Amy's birthday surprise to John. There are some tensions with an ex-lover in the midst. Professor Vasquez has other ideas and is using this outing to further his own agenda which is finding the lost treasure. He has also hired three commando type mercenaries to help him in his mission. The location of the treasure is located in the "Cave of Souls" which happens to be on a military artillery practice range which is used by the Mexican government. Things don't go to plan and there is also a double-cross in the mix. A curse is unleashed and they have to deal with skeletal warriors who were once the soldiers of Coronado.

== Cast ==
- Ross Kelly as John Barnes
- Stephanie Marchese as Amy Barnes
- Miguel Martinez as Professor Gordon Vasquez and General De Gama
- Mike Hatfield as Fred Griffith
- Malcolm Madera as Tobias Schuler
- Audrey Anderson as Jenny Crane
- Vic Browder as Matt Kittridge
- Jocelyn Tucker as Kristen McKnew
- Jeffrey James Mocho as Jack Johnson
- Casey Messer as Alicia Williamson
- Matt Camacho as Rodruigo Taylor
- Jason Hill as Graham Earl
- Brian Lucero as Spencer Combs

== Release ==
The film was released on DVD by Maverick Entertainment Group on March 4, 2008.

== Reception ==
HorrorNews.net gave the film a mixed review, writing, "While this is not a great film by any means, if you are in the right kind of mood than [sic] it is a fun watch. And by the right kind of mood I mean if you’re ready for melodramatic acting, cheesy effects and a traditional B-movie atmosphere. If you’re not use to seeing these types of film, then I would advise to stay far away."
