= The War Boys =

- Directed by: Ronald Daniels
- Written by: Naomi Wallace (play and screenplay); Bruce McLeod
- Produced by: Carly Hugo; Matt Parker; Gill Holland; John Hart; Jeff Sine
- Starring: Benjamin Walker; Victor Rasuk; Brian J. Smith; Greg Serano; Teresa Yenque; Cheyenne Serano; Micaela Nevárez; Peter Gallagher
- Cinematography: Horacio Marquínez
- Edited by: David Leonardo
- Music by: Stephen Cullo
- Production company: Group Entertainment
- Distributed by: Snapping Turtle Films
- Release date: August 7, 2009; (United States)
- Running time: 92 minutes
- Country: United States
- Languages: English; Spanish

The War Boys is a 2009 American independent drama film directed by Ronald Daniels and starring Peter Gallagher, Victor Rasuk, Brian J. Smith and Benjamin Walker. Its screenplay was written by Naomi Wallace and Bruce McLeod, based on the play of the same name by Naomi Wallace.

== Plot ==
David Welch has been suspended from college. He and two friends, Greg and George, spend their time along the U.S.-Mexico border, alerting the border patrol to illegal border crossings and calling themselves "The War Boys." David is angry at his father, who won't agree to him leaving school to work in the family trucking business. David devises a plan to hijack one of his father's trucks, expecting it to be carrying a shipment of black market TVs from Mexico. The boys succeed in stealing the truck and they temporarily park the locked truck in a desolate area while they look for a purchaser for the stolen goods. David's father vows revenge against whoever stole from him. David is surprised that his father is so upset instead of just seeing the stolen truck as a business loss.

While the truck sits abandoned, Greg pursues Marta, a local Mexican woman, and David and George explore their attraction for one another. David's father discovers his son's relationship with George and confronts him, expressing disapproval of George's family and economic status.

The operation goes perfectly until some unidentified men vaguely threaten Marta. She had occasionally helped immigrants to get fake documents, and the traffickers interrogate her on the whereabouts of the cargo. This makes it clear to the trio that the truck must contain something more valuable than just televisions, possibly drugs. Determined to get some profit anyway, they choose to return to the wasteland, take what they can from the truck, and then report its location to the traffickers via an anonymous call.

When they unlock the truck's storage, they discover its cargo included Mexican immigrants being smuggled into the US—and who are now dead after being locked in the truck for so long. Their rage and fear leads the situation to slip completely out of their control as David's father arrives with the police. David confronts his father at gunpoint and is shot by the police. George screams for help as David dies in his arms.

== Cast ==
- Victor Rasuk as Greg
- Brian J. Smith as George
- Benjamin Walker as David Welch
- Peter Gallagher as Slater Welch
- Micaela Nevárez as Marta
- Teresa Yenque as Maria
- Cheyenne Serano as Cat
- Ross Kelly as Agent Burrows

== Production ==
The film was shot over a twenty-three-day span in Albuquerque, New Mexico. According to Daniels, the shoot was plagued by sandstorms and prop mishaps.

== Release and reception ==
The film premiered at the Birmingham Gay and Lesbian Film Festival on May 30, 2009. It went on to be screened at the Woods Hole Film Festival, held in Woods Hole, Massachusetts; the San Antonio Film Festival, held in San Antonio, Texas; and the SoCal Independent Film Festival, held in Huntington Beach, California, where it won the Best Feature Film Award.

== See also ==
- List of American films of 2009
- List of drama films
- List of films: U-V-W
