= Urban Justice =

2007 film directed by Don E. Fauntleroy

- DVD cover
- Directed by: Don E. FauntLeRoy
- Written by: Gilmar Fortis II
- Produced by: Steven Seagal
- Starring: Steven Seagal; Eddie Griffin; Carmen Serano; Danny Trejo
- Cinematography: Don E. FauntLeRoy
- Edited by: Scott Conrad
- Music by: Peter Meisner
- Production companies: Screen Gems; Steamroller Pictures
- Distributed by: Sony Pictures Home Entertainment
- Release date: November 13, 2007
- Running time: 96 minutes
- Country: United States
- Language: English

Urban Justice (released in the United Kingdom as Renegade Justice) is a 2007 American vigilante action film directed and shot by Don E. FauntLeRoy. It stars Steven Seagal with a supporting cast of Eddie Griffin, Carmen Serano and Danny Trejo. The film was released direct-to-DVD in the United States on November 13, 2007.

== Plot ==
In Los Angeles, two rival gangs war with each other: the Hyde Park Gang, led by El Chivo, and the East Side Gangsters, led by Armand Tucker. Vice cop Max Ballister receives a call he assumes to be from his informant, Gary Morrison. Max leaves a romantic dinner with his wife and is gunned down. Max's angry father, Simon, a martial arts expert who is implied to be ex-CIA, moves to the neighborhood in which Max died and begins investigating. His landlady, Alice Park, who also runs a liquor store, aids him. The others do not know that the investigating cop, Frank Shaw, has formed a partnership with Tucker.

As Simon investigates, he leaves a trail of beaten and dead gangsters. Gary gives Simon a lead on El Chivo, who runs most of the booking joints that Max went after. At his private club, El Chivo suggests that Tucker ordered the hit on Max. A pair of East Side Gangsters chase Simon via car, and Simon causes them to crash. One gangster dies, and Simon interrogates the other, Gary's brother Isaiah Morrison, who says Tucker sent them. Isaiah talks to Tucker, and Tucker threatens to kill everyone Isaiah cares about unless he kills Simon. The next morning, Simon saves Gary from a group of racists. Simon asks him if Isaiah was Max's killer, but Gary does not respond. As Gary leaves, Simon plants a tracking device on him.

Simon tracks Gary to a warehouse and uses electronic equipment to eavesdrop on his conversation, a meeting between the gangs. After Simon plants more tracking devices, he hears Shaw and a sudden burst of gunfire. When it is over, Chivo's gang is dead at the hands of dirty cops in the employ of Shaw; Tucker and Shaw take the drugs and money. Simon tracks them to another warehouse, breaks in, and finds their cocaine. Tucker's men follow Simon back to Park's liquor store, where Simon has an apartment. Using his tracking device, Simon notices they are outside and tells Alice to hide. When they break in, Simon kills them and escorts Alice outside past more gangsters, whom he kills. Tucker shoots Simon and wounds him, then manages to escape. Alice takes Simon to her cousin, Winston, who works at USC Medical center.

The next day, Simon goes to Isaiah's and Gary's house, beats Isaiah up, and finds the murder weapon. When Gary returns home, Simon forces him to admit that Shaw is behind everything, including Max's murder. Gary explains that he was afraid to talk and that Shaw killed Max because he witnessed a deal between Shaw and Tucker.

Later that night, Shaw and Tucker meet with a drug dealer from New York at a warehouse. As Simon arrives and begins killing gangsters, Shaw kills the New York drug dealer. After killing all of Tucker's and Shaw's men, Simon confronts Shaw. As Simon chokes Shaw to death, Tucker walks in with a gun and watches, despite Shaw's orders to open fire.

Simon then disarms Tucker and turns the gun on him, but he lets Tucker go, saying that he has no beef with him. Simon hands back the gun and leaves, earning Tucker's respect with his cool demeanor.

== Cast ==
- Steven Seagal as Simon Ballister
- Eddie Griffin as Armand Tucker
- Carmen Serano as Alice Park
- Cory Hart as Officer Max Ballister
- Liezl Carstens as Linda
- Kirk B. R. Woller as Detective Frank Shaw
- Mary Evans as Irene
- Al Staggs as Priest
- Jade Yorker as Gary Morrison
- Jermaine Washington as Rasheed
- Brian Lucero as Benny
- Danny Trejo as "El Chivo"
- Diego Lopez as Winston
- Grady McCardell as Dwight Morris
- Brett Brock as Watch Sergeant
- Ronald Hamilton as Police Man

== Release ==
Urban Justice was released on DVD in the United States on November 13, 2007.

== Reception ==
Nathan Rabin of The Dissolve wrote, "Urban Justice is a sublimely ridiculous exercise in unintentional self-parody, a so-bad-it's-good romp highly recommended to Seagal fans and detractors alike." Hock Teh of IGN rated it 5/10 and recommended it Seagal fans only. Ian Jane of DVD Talk rated it 3/5 stars and wrote that "the film is entertaining if you don't mind turning your brain off". David Johnson of DVD Verdict rated it 58/100 and wrote that the film has poor acting and fight scenes.
