= Craig W. Chenery =

British writer

- Writing career
- Years active: 1996–present
- Genres: dark humor, dystopian, horror, children's, science fiction, steampunk

Craig W. Chenery is a British-American author, screenwriter, comic book writer, and artist with a particular interest in the dark humor, zombie, horror, comedy, pop culture, Star Wars and special effects genres.

== Writing ==
Craig W. Chenery is the author of Blood Splatter: A Guide to Cinematic Zombie Violence, Gore and Special Effects. It is a study of the zombie genre as defined by gore and special effects. Chenery interviewed genre professionals, including Greg Nicotero, Tom Savini, John Russo and Lloyd Kaufman of Troma Entertainment.

Chenery is the co-author of the Butch G. Cat series of children's novels children's book series. The first two books in the series were released in late 2012 and book three was released September 2013. As of 2014, these books are out of print.

In 2014, Chenery released the bestselling The Comicon and Convention Survival Guide. It is an in-depth study of the logistics behind attending pop culture events. The second edition followed in October 2015. He has also contributed stories and articles to numerous horror and Steampunk anthologies and magazines.

In 2019, Chenery finished his debut novel God Just Wanted to Play Golf, the first book in The Oceanview Trilogy. Lucifer Just Wanted to Pet Kittens book two in the series, was released December 2022. Chenery is currently working on book three tentatively titled Death Just Wanted to Eat Waffles.

In 2019, Chenery started writing the screenplay for "Dr. Saville's Horror Show". The movie was filmed in 2019 and 2020, and was released 4 April 2023.

Chenery is a lifelong supporter of EFL Championship football team Ipswich Town F.C. and USL Championship team Phoenix Rising FC.

== Bibliography ==
=== Books ===
Year	Title	Genre	Notes
2011	The Undead The Saved Christmas 2	Horror	Author of "The Last Noel"
2011	The Undead That Saved Christmas: Vampire Edition	Horror	Author of "In The Twilight Of Christmas"
2012	Blood Splatter: A Guide to Cinematic Zombie Violence, Gore and Special Effects	Reference: Horror	WINNER Dead Letter Awards – Best Horror Reference Book
2012	Z Magazine	Horror	Author of "The Zombie Survival Guide: Essential Reading or Bible of Hatred?"
2013	Steampunk Originals: Volume 1	Steampunk, Horror	Author of "Vow". Illustrated by Dominic Black
2014	The Comicon and Convention Survival Guide	Reference: Pop Culture	
2015	The Comicon and Convention Survival Guide - Second Edition	Reference: Pop Culture	
2019	God Just Wanted To Play Golf	Humor, Horror	Book 1 of The Oceanview Trilogy
2022	Lucifer Just Wanted To Pet Kittens	Humor	Book 2 of The Oceanview Trilogy

=== Comic Books ===
Year	Title	Genre	Notes
2024	Shadowblade Issue #1	Dystopian action/adventure	Craig W. Chenery - writer, lettering. Kevin R. Phipps - writer, coloring. Gianluca Testaverde - pencils and inks.
2025	Shadowblade Issue #2	Dystopian action/adventure	Craig W. Chenery - writer, lettering. Kevin R. Phipps - writer, coloring. Gianluca Testaverde - pencils and inks.
2026	Shadowblade Issue #3	Dystopian action/adventure	Craig W. Chenery - writer, lettering. Kevin R. Phipps - writer, coloring. Gianluca Testaverde - pencils and inks.
2026	Shadowblade Issue #4	Dystopian action/adventure	Craig W. Chenery - writer, lettering. Kevin R. Phipps - writer, coloring. Gianluca Testaverde - pencils and inks.

=== Screenplays ===
Year	Title	Notes
1996	Married... With Children	"Singing to a Different Fortune" - Co-written with Danny Renfroe (unoptioned screenplay)
1997	Butterfinger	Co-written with Danny Renfroe (unoptioned screenplay)
2008	Blood Brothers	Ghostwriter (optioned but stalled in development)
2011	The Butch G. Cat Movie	Co-written with Danny Renfroe (optioned but stalled in development)
2022	Dr. Saville's Horror Show	Completed and released in 2023
2025	Angel of Death	In post production - "Rest Stop" screenwriter
2026	Shadowblade	In development
2026	God Just Wanted To Play Golf	In development

== Public appearances ==
Chenery has been interviewed by numerous podcasts and radio shows on a variety of subjects related to horror, special effects, science fiction, and mental health.

In 2012, Chenery was invited to present at Phoenix Comicon on the evolution of special effects in zombie cinema. In 2013, Phoenix Comicon invited Chenery to present new panels, including A Visual History of Zombie Cinema and a ten-year retrospect of cult classic, Shaun of the Dead. Chenery was also a guest judge at the Zombie Beauty Pageant. Chenery has been a staple presenter at the event, and continues to present.

He was also a guest at the Rapture Horror Expo in October 2012 and 2013. Chenery was a guest author at Phoenix FearCon VII in 2015, VIII in 2019 and X in 2021. In 2017, he was a guest presenter at Westercon.

== Filmography ==
=== Film ===
Year	Title	Role	Notes
2008	The Max Power Hour	British Journalist	Season 1, Episode 6 "Innerview"
2008	Inside Patsy	Jason Patton	Season 1, Episode 2 "Audit"
2008	Evil Breakfast Dead Club	Boom Operator	Promotional trailer
2009	An Uplifting Tale	Narrator	
2010	Vincent and Me	Narrator	Season 3, Episode 7 "Vincent's Christmas Carol"
2013	.357	Night Club patron	Uncredited
2017	Surviving The Zombie Plague	Zombie, FX Artist	
2017	Friday the 13th Part 3: The Memoriam Documentary	Himself	
2018	Strange Nature	Thanks	
2022	Dr. Saville's Horror Show	Screenwriter, producer	
2025	Angel of Death	Screenwriter	"Rest Stop" short

=== Other acting ===
Chenery was also a member of The Gentleman's Club Comedy Improv troupe. The troupe was a long form three-man monoscene Improv Troupe and have previously been nominated for Arizona's Best Comedy or Improv Troupe two years running. The Gentleman's Club performed monthly at Club Mardi Gras in Scottsdale, and Space 55 in Phoenix. In 2010, they appeared at the Phoenix Improv Festival. He has also performed with The Phoenix Neutrino Project where he both acted and scored the live soundtrack on numerous improvised live movies.

== Art ==
In January 2017, Chenery debuted his latest project called "Comicones". Comicones is an art design project that presents a playful look at pop culture characters, including Disney, Star Wars, DC Comics, Marvel Comic, Doctor Who and many more. He has also included celebrities including Tommy Wiseau and Weird Al Yankovic. At present, Chenery has created over 1000 characters. In his words "Comicones is a celebration of equality, but also of uniqueness". Comicones is an official licensee of Jay and Silent Bob, Star Trek, Shaun of the Dead, Adventure time, and Rick and Morty. Chenery is working on more official licensing for the brand.

== Critical reception ==
Chenery's work has been positively reviewed by numerous print publications such as Fangoria Magazine, Rue Morgue Magazine, Gore Noir Magazine, Ultra Violent Magazine, Z Magazine, Stiff Magazine, and genre websites such as Dread Central and Bloody Disgusting. Issue 312 of Fangoria called Blood Splatter "A Must Have". His debut film, "Dr. Saville's Horror Show", has won numerous awards and has been an official selection at twelve film festivals across the globe.

=== Improv ===
Year	Title	Event	Award	Result
2010	The Gentleman's Club	Arizona Republic Arizona's Best	Best Improv or Comedy Troupe	Nominee
2011	The Gentleman's Club	Arizona Republic Arizona's Best	Best Improv or Comedy Troupe	Nominee

=== Writing ===
Year	Title	Event	Award	Result
2013	Blood Splatter: A Guide to Cinematic Zombie Violence, Gore and Special Effects	Dead Letter Awards	Best Horror Reference Book	Won
2019	God Just Wanted To Play Golf	Maxy Awards	Best Independent Horror Novel	Runner Up.

=== Film ===
Year	Title	Event	Award	Result
2022	Dr. Saville's Horror Show	Atlanta Horror Film Festival	Best Horror film	Official Selection
2022	Dr. Saville's Horror Show	Tucson Terrorfest	Best Arizona Horror film	Won
2022	Dr. Saville's Horror Show	Frights and Fears Horror Festival	Best Film	Won
2022	Dr. Saville's Horror Show	Frights and Fears Horror Festival	Best Cast	Won
2022	Dr. Saville's Horror Show	Frights and Fears Horror Festival	Best Kill	Won
2022	Dr. Saville's Horror Show	Thrills and Chills International Film Festival	Best Film	Official Selection
2022	Dr. Saville's Horror Show	Tokyo Film Awards	Best Horror Film	Won
2022	Dr. Saville's Horror Show	Reel Screen Film Fest	Best Horror Film	Official Selection
2022	Dr. Saville's Horror Show	Scream Queen Film Festival	Best Horror Film	Official Selection
2022	Dr. Saville's Horror Show	Sweden Film Festival	Best Horror Film	Won
2022	Dr. Saville's Horror Show	Budapest Best International Film Festival	Best Horror Film	Won
2022	Dr. Saville's Horror Show	Boden International Film Festival	Best Horror Film	Official Selection
2023	Dr. Saville's Horror Show	Worldwide Women's Film Festival	Best Horror Film	Won
2023	Dr. Saville's Horror Show	Calgary Horror Con XI	Best Horror Feature	Official Selection
2024	Dr. Saville's Horror Show	Horror Island	Best Feature Film	Won
