= Robert Sedgwick (actor) =

American actor

- Born: United States
- Other name: Rob Sedgwick
- Occupation: Actor
- Years active: 1984-present
- Relatives: Kyra Sedgwick (sister); Kevin Bacon (brother-in-law); Sosie Bacon (niece)

Robert Sedgwick is an American actor. He is the brother of actress Kyra Sedgwick.

Sedgwick graduated from Bennington College in 1984. That year, he made his debut on the television soap opera Another World as Hunter Bradshaw. During the 1980s, he appeared in several Hollywood movies, such as Staying Together, Morgan Stewart's Coming Home and Nasty Hero. In the 1990s, he appeared in several films, such as Tales from the Darkside: The Movie, Die Hard with a Vengeance and Vibrations. In 2005, Sedgwick appeared in the film Loverboy alongside his sister Kyra, brother-in-law Kevin Bacon, nephew and niece Travis and Sosie Bacon.

In 2003, Sedgwick was the voice of Smilies #3 in the video game Manhunt.

He also made television appearances for television shows, such One Life to Live, Law & Order, Deadline and Ed.

== Filmography ==
- Another World (TV Series) (1984-1985) - Hunter Bradshaw
- Morgan Stewart's Coming Home (1987) - Craighton
- Nasty Hero (TV) (1987) - Brad
- Staying Together (1989) - Doctor
- Tales from the Darkside: The Movie (1990) - Lee (segment "Lot 249")
- Tune in Tomorrow... (1990) - Elmore Dubarque
- One Life to Live (TV Series) (1990) - Greg Ellis
- Law & Order (TV Series) (1993-2005) - Elliot Peters/Mickey
- Die Hard with a Vengeance (1995) - Rolf
- Vibrations (1996) - Bugger
- Side Streets (1998) - Frank
- Perfect Murder, Perfect Town: JonBenét and the City of Boulder (TV) (2000) - Chris Wolf
- Deadline (TV Series) (2000) - Peter Stoneman
- Ed (TV Series) (2001)
- Law & Order: Special Victims Unit (TV Series) (2001) - James Campbell
- Law & Order: Criminal Intent (TV Series) (2004) - Mike
- Everyone's Depressed (2005) - Tennis Pro
- Loverboy (2005) - Emily's 3rd Grade Teacher
- The Mirror (2005) - Adam
- Leaving Gussie (2007) - Rex
- 30 Rock (TV Series) (2008) - Archery Coach
- Damages (TV Series) (2010) - Donnie Rhyne
- The Following (TV Series) (2015) - Oleg
- Banshee (2016) - Hightower
- Police State (2016) - Desk Sergeant
- The Blacklist (2017) - Tyson Pryor
