= Guts & Glory (TV series) =

- Genre: Reality competition
- Created by: Greg Nicotero
- Presented by: Greg Nicotero
- Country of origin: United States
- No. of seasons: 1
- No. of episodes: 6

Production
- Executive producers: Greg Nicotero; Chris Stonich; Andrew Molina; Chris Wagner; Brian Witten
- Running time: 35 minutes
- Production company: White Label Productions

Original release
- Network: Shudder
- Release: October 14, 2025 – present

Guts & Glory, also known as Greg Nicotero's Guts & Glory, is an American reality television series created by special effects makeup artist Greg Nicotero that premiered on October 14, 2025, on Shudder. The contestants compete in horror film and Universal's Halloween Horror Nights-inspired scenarios. Situations heavily utilize Nicotero's work, who described the show as a cross between The Blair Witch Project and Survivor. The last contestant remaining, the winner, will be awarded a 2025 Hyundai Tucson XRT and $15,000.

== Episodes ==
=== Episode 1: "The Deep Dark Woods" ===
Original airdate: October 14, 2025

Ten contestants are taken to an Alabama swamp, where they're divided into two teams and search for totems of cryptids. Team 1 consist of Lucien, Kolbie, Makayla, Julia & Alexis. Team 2 consist of Dujuan, Brian, Josh, Bradi & Juliene. The dark nature of the competition comes into focus when one of the contestants wanders off into the night.

  - ELIMINATED: Juliene

=== Episode 2: "Hospital of Horror" ===
Original airdate: October 14, 2025

In a haunted hospital, the contestants must search within the guts of a decaying corpse. Later, they must correctly guess the weight of the guts. Brian was set to be eliminated, but host Greg Nicotero saved him.

  - WINNER: Josh
  - ELIMINATED: None

=== Episode 3: "The Hitcher" ===
Original airdate: October 21, 2025

  - WINNERS: Kolbie, Bradi, Makayla and Dujuan
  - ELIMINATED: Brian, Alexis, and Lucien

=== Episode 4: "Rest in Pieces" ===
Original airdate: October 28, 2025

  - ELIMINATED: Dujuan and Bradi

=== Episode 5: "Back From The Dead" ===
Original airdate: November 4, 2025

  - WINNER: Kolbie (Wins 2025 Hyundai Tucson XRT and $15,000)
  - RUNNER-UP: Mikayla (Awarded $10,000)
  - ELIMINATED: Josh and Julia

=== Episode 6: "Demons Among Us" ===
Original airdate: November 4, 2025

A look behind-the-scenes of the show.
