= Save Me (film) =

- Theatrical release poster
- Directed by: Robert Cary
- Screenplay by: Robert Desiderio
- Story by: Craig Chester; Alan Hines
- Produced by: Christopher Racster; Herb Hamsher; Chad Allen; Robert Gant; Judith Light
- Starring: Chad Allen; Robert Gant; Judith Light; Stephen Lang
- Cinematography: Rodney Taylor
- Edited by: Phillip J. Bartell
- Music by: Jeff Cardoni
- Distributed by: First Run Features
- Release dates: January 21, 2007 (Sundance Film Festival); September 5, 2008 (United States)
- Running time: 96 minutes
- Country: United States
- Language: English

Save Me is an American drama film 2007 film directed by Robert Cary about Mark (Chad Allen), a drug-addicted gay man who is admitted into an ex-gay program run by Gayle (Judith Light) and her husband Ted (Stephen Lang). The film premiered at the 2007 Sundance Film Festival and was later picked up for distribution by independent studio First Run Features.

In September 2008 the film began its limited theatrical release in select markets in the United States.

The film screened at several film festivals and drew positive reviews from Entertainment Weekly, Variety, Time Out London and several other publications.

== Plot summary ==
When Mark—a young gay man addicted to sex and drugs—hits bottom, his concerned brother checks him into a Christian retreat in the New Mexico desert. Run by a compassionate husband and wife team, Gayle and Ted have made it their life's mission to "cure" young men of their 'gay affliction' through spiritual guidance. At first, Mark resists, but soon takes the message to heart. As Mark's fellowship with his fellow Ex-Gays grow stronger, however, he finds himself powerfully drawn to Scott, another young man battling family demons of his own. As their friendship begins to develop into romance, Mark and Scott are forced to confront their true selves.

== Cast ==
Actor	Role
Jeremy Glazer	Trey
Chad Allen	Mark
David Petruzzi	Dustin
Arron Shiver	Jude
Colin Jones	Randall
Stephen Lang	Ted
Judith Light	Gayle
William Dennis Hurley	Bill
Robert Gant	Scott
Robert Baker	Lester
Ross Kelly	Adam
Luce Rains	Clerk
Paul Scallan	Paul
Carmen Morales	Lydia
Forrest Fyre	Dr. Wilson
Greg Serano	Hector
Marc Miles	Pastor Thompson
Kevin Wiggins	Mr. Andrews
Mary Evans	Mrs. Andrews
Hunter Krestan	John
Carmen Serano	Anna
Sam Gill	Jeff
