= Greg Serano =

American actor (born 1972)

- Born: August 7, 1972 (age 54); Brooklyn, New York, U.S.
- Occupation: Actor
- Years active: 1996–present
- Spouse: Carmen Serano (m. 1997; div. 2013)
- Children: 2

Greg Serano (born August 7, 1972) is an American actor. He is best known for his role of Pablo Betart on Wildfire and as Enrique Salvatore in Legally Blonde. He played a role in Power as Agent Juan Julio Medina.

== Filmography ==
=== Film ===
Year	Title	Role	Notes
1996	The Rich Man's Wife	Gangbanger	
1997	The Postman	California Carrier	
1997	The Journey: Absolution	Chad Hubbard	
2001	The Cross	John	
2001	Legally Blonde	Enrique Salvatore	
2001	Frailty	FBI Agent #1	
2002	Road Dogz	Alfonso Carrasco	
2002	Saint Sinner	Tomas Alcala	TV movie
2003	National Security	Carjacker	
2005	Marilyn Hotchkiss' Ballroom Dancing & Charm School	Officer #1	
2007	Save Me	Hector	
2007	In the Valley of Elah	Detective Manny Nunez	
2007	American Dream	Javier Garcia	Short
2008	Conspiracy	Miguel Silva	
2008	Felon	Officer Diaz	
2008	The Stand	Tim Walton	Short
2008	Beer For My Horses	Tito Garza	
2009	Not Forgotten	Deputy Valdez	
2009	Terminator Salvation	Hideki	
2009	The War Boys	Silvio	
2010	Deadly Impact	Ryan Alba	
2010	Undocumented	Davie DeCario	
2015	LA Apocalypse	Ramirez	
2015	Broken Horses	Miguel Santion	
2016	Wild for the Night	Spike	
2017	Distortion	Erick Marshall	
2018	Canal Street	Flako	
2019	3 from Hell	Warlock	

=== Television ===
Year	Title	Role	Notes
1996-97	Dangerous Minds	Gusmaro Lopez	Main Cast
1997	Diagnosis: Murder	Roberto	Episode: "Blood Brothers Murder"
1997	Alright Already	Cesar	Episode: "Again with the Black Box"
1998	Early Edition	Wayne Moreno	Episode: "Return of Crumb"
1998	ER	EVAC Pilot	Episode: "Family Practice"
1998	The Magnificent Seven	Chanu	Episode: "Manhunt"
1998	Walker, Texas Ranger	Hector Lopez	Episode: "Trackdown"
1998	Touched by an Angel	Jorge	Episode: "An Angel on the Roof"
1999	The Pretender	Manny	Episode: "Qallupilluit"
2002	CSI: Crime Scene Investigation	Javier Molina	Episode: "Fight Night"
2002	The Twilight Zone	Marco Flores	Episode: "Last Lap"
2003	Kingpin	Joaquin	Recurring Cast
2003	The Dead Zone	Danny Avila	Episode: "The Combination"
2004	North Shore	Pedro Garcia	Episode: "Sucker Punch"
2005-08	Wildfire	Pablo Betart	Main Cast
2010	Scoundrels	Cruz	Recurring Cast
2011	Unforgettable	Detective Ben Cortez	Episode: "Trajectories"
2012	The Mentalist	Dion Warren	Episode: "War of the Roses"
2014	The Night Shift	Steve	Episode: "Hog Wild"
2014-18	Power	Agent Juan Julio Medina	Main Cast: Season 1, Recurring Cast: Season 3 & 5
2015	Agent Carter	Agent Rick Ramirez	Episode: "The Iron Ceiling"
2016	NCIS	Jalen Washington	Episode: "Decompressed"
2016	Castle	FBI Agent Napier	Episode: "And Justice for All"
2016	Lethal Weapon	Motorcycle Shop Owner	Episode: "Can I Get a Witness?"
2018	NCIS: Los Angeles	FBI Special Agent Roger Gonzalez	Guest Cast: Season 9-10
2019	Hawaii Five-0	Jameson	Episode: "Ho'opio 'ia e ka noho ali'i a ka ua"
2020	NCIS: New Orleans	Lawrence Chastang	Episode: "The Root of All Evil"
2020	The Rookie	T.O. Martinez	Recurring Cast: Season 2
2022	Power Book IV: Force	Agent Juan Julio Medina	Episode: "Family Business"
2022	Mayans M.C.	Jay-Jay	Recurring Cast: Season 4
2023	Power Book II: Ghost	Agent Juan Julio Medina	Recurring Cast: Season 3

== See also ==
- List of people from Brooklyn
