= Ralph Marrero =

American actor

- Marrero in Day of the Dead (1985)
- Born: August 21, 1958; New York City, U.S
- Died: November 16, 1991 (aged 33); Albuquerque, New Mexico, U.S
- Occupation: Actor
- Years active: 1985–1991

Ralph Marrero (August 21, 1958 – November 16, 1991) was an American actor. He is best remembered for his portrayal of Private Robert Rickles in George A. Romero's post-apocalyptic zombie horror film Day of the Dead (1985). He also appeared in the comedy horror film Tales from the Darkside: The Movie (1990).

Marrero died on November 16, 1991, in an automobile accident in Albuquerque, New Mexico. His final film role was as the baseball player Ping Bodie in the biographical sports drama film The Babe (1992).

== Filmography ==
Year	Title	Role	Notes
1985	Day of the Dead	Private Robert Rickles	
1990	Tales from the Darkside: The Movie	The Cabbie	(segment "Lot 249")
1990	Street Hunter	Eddie	
1991	Johnny Suede	Bartender	
1992	The Babe	Ping Bodie	(final film role)
