= Isaac Kappy =

American actor (1977–2019)

- Born: February 17, 1977; Albuquerque, New Mexico, U.S.
- Died: May 13, 2019 (aged 42); Bellemont, Arizona, U.S.
- Occupation: Actor
- Years active: 2006–2019

Isaac Kappy (February 17, 1977 – May 13, 2019) was an American actor. He had roles in the films Thor (2011) and Terminator Salvation (2009) and in the AMC television series Breaking Bad.

== Career ==
Kappy made his feature film debut as a hustler in the movie Beerfest (2006). He would go on to act in the movies Not Forgotten, Fanboys, Terminator Salvation, Saint John of Las Vegas (all 2009), Klown Kamp Massacre (2010), Lemonade Mouth, Thor, and 10 Years (all 2011), and the television series Breaking Bad, The Night Shift, and Rachel Dratch's Late Night Snack.

As a musician, Kappy played in the band Charles McMansion with Tom Sandoval. The group released one recording, the song "T.I.P." (an acronym for Touch In Public), and appeared on the reality show Vanderpump Rules.

== Personal life ==
Kappy appeared as a guest on Alex Jones' radio show InfoWars in August 2018, on which he accused multiple movie stars, such as Tom Hanks and Seth Green, of pedophilia as part of the QAnon conspiracy theory, which involves a cabal of child molesters who run a global child sex-trafficking ring. During the broadcast, Jones asked Kappy to be more circumspect and avoid "getting into names", while Kappy briefly insisted Jones was "gaslighting" him by querying his claims. The Daily Beast mentioned that around this time, Kappy has become a "hero" of the QAnon movement in its news section.

In the years following his death, a conspiracy theory arose that he did not die by suicide, but was rather the victim of foul play, due to his political views, spread by conspiracy theorists such as Lin Wood.

=== Legal issues ===
In 2018, Kappy was investigated by police after reportedly threatening actress Paris Jackson and actor Seth Green. Jackson accused Kappy of choking her at a party they were both attending. The Los Angeles Police Department (LAPD) confirmed an investigation, but said it was not active as of August 2018.

== Death ==
In 2019, Kappy died by suicide by jumping off an overpass into oncoming traffic in Arizona. Two bystanders on the bridge attempted to prevent Kappy from throwing himself from the bridge but were unsuccessful. Around the time of his death, a lengthy note was posted on his Instagram account, in which he claimed to be the reincarnation of Judas Iscariot, while opening up about his drug and alcohol abuse. He also apologized to Jesus Christ, Donald Trump, and QAnon. The post was captioned, "Beware the man that has nothing to lose, for he has nothing to protect".

== Filmography ==
=== Film ===
Year	Title	Role	Ref(s)
2006	Beerfest	Antonio	
2009	Fanboys	Garfunkel	
2009	Terminator Salvation	Barbarosa	
2009	Saint John of Las Vegas	Geek	
2010	Klown Kamp Massacre	Buzter Pie	
2011	Lemonade Mouth	Mel	
2011	Thor	Pet Store Clerk	
2011	10 Years	Gutterball	

=== Television ===
Year	Title	Role	Notes	Ref(s)
2009	Breaking Bad	Rowdy Prisoner	Episode: "Seven Thirty-Seven"	
2015	The Night Shift	Sean	Hold On	
2016	Rachel Dratch's Late Night Snack	Actor	Love, Life, and Outer Space	
