= Pinfall (short story) =

Short story by Stephen King

- Short story by Stephen King and George A. Romero
- Country: United States
- Language: English
- Genre: Horror short story/screenplay

Publication

"Pinfall" is an unpublished short story/film treatment by Stephen King and George A. Romero. It was originally written by King as a segment for the 1987 anthology film Creepshow 2, with Romero developing it into a script in 1984, but was never filmed. In 2016, a comic book adaptation of the story was produced by Jason Mayoh.

== Authorship ==
It is unclear to what extent "Pinfall" was authored by Stephen King or George A. Romero. The 2006 work Stephen King: Uncollected, Unpublished states "...there is much speculation as to exactly how much, if anything, King wrote of it [but] it seems certain the story idea was his". The screenplay version is credited solely to Romero, though Stephen Spignesi suggests "King's special touch is clearly evident in the stage directions in the script". In a 1991 interview with Cinefantastique, Romero stated "I wrote it from a couple of pages that [King] had sketched out. King himself stated in an interview that "The notes I sent [Romero] were pretty detailed, and they even had some dialogue, but [Romero] really carried it off" and that "[Romero] sent me the script, and I suggested some cuts and some changes, and some of them were made and some were not." King describes "Pinfall" as "a Jack Davis kind of story" inspired by the notorious EC Comics strip "Foul Play".

== Plot summary ==
This summary relates to the version of the story appearing in the Creepshow 2 screenplay.

The story centers on two rival teams in a ten-pin bowling league: the white-collar "Regi-Men" (led by the self-important Reggie Rambeaux, who takes bowling extremely seriously) and the blue-collar "Bad News Boors" (led by the easy-going Chooch Mandolino, who prioritises having a good time with his friends). As the story begins, the two teams are bowling in adjacent lanes on team night at the "Big Ten Lanes" bowling alley in "Everytown", with the Regi-Men on track to win the league. After an 82-year old bowling aficionado named J. Frederick MacDugal incurs Reggie's ire by breaking his concentration, Chooch invites MacDugal to become an honorary member of the Bad News Boors for the night. While attempting to make a 7–10 split, MacDugal suffers a "cardiac seizure", resulting in a freak accident that sees him fatally crushed by the pinsetter.

Following MacDugal's death, it is revealed that he was "the world's tenth wealthiest man" and that he has bequeathed five million dollars after tax to the Big Ten Lanes team with the highest score at the end of the season. After the Bad News Boors begin narrowing the Regi-Men's lead, the Regi-Men resort to sabotaging their opponents' Dodge van by surreptitiously loosening bolts on the axle, resulting in the Bad News Boors being killed when the van careens off a cliff and explodes. Following the incident, which is deemed a "tragic accident", the Regi-Men publicly announce they will buy each of the Bad News Boors special headstones to commemorate them if they win the league.

While the Regi-Men are practicing late one night in the closed Big Ten Lanes, the lights are switched off and they are confronted by the zombified Bad News Boors. The Regi-Men are gruesomely killed, with one member throttled, another electrified by being thrown into an arcade game, and another being impaled on a hot dog rotisserie and subsequently melted. Reggie himself is killed by having holes drilled into his skull with a ball driller. The story ends with the Bad News Boors - joined by the similarly zombified MacDugal - drinking "blood beers" and bowling using the Regi-Men's arms and legs as pins and Reggie's head as a ball.

== Reception ==
Reviewing the un-filmed screenplay in 2014, John Squires described "Pinfall" as a "fun tale". Stephen J. Spignesi described it as "a fun piece" and "an honest tribute to E.C. Comics".

== Adaptations ==
"Pinfall" was intended to be filmed as a segment for the 1987 anthology film Creepshow 2. The treatment by Stephen King was adapted into a script by screenplay writer George A. Romero, but the segment was dropped "at the last minute", reportedly due to concerns that the special effects required would push the production over budget. Benjamin T. Rubin suggests that the decision to remove "Pinfall" from Creepshow 2 was also based on concerns around the film's runtime (the script of "Pinfall" is 27 pages, suggesting the segment would have added close to 30 minutes to the runtime of Creepshow 2). Rubin also suggests that "It was partially a special effects issue. Which I find extremely hard to believe that, you know, Savini and Nicotero couldn't pull that off. But that’s at least one story that I've heard." In a 1991 interview, Romero stated "It was my total favorite. It'll probably turn up in another movie somewhere."

In 2014, British filmmaker Dayle Teegarden launched a Kickstarter campaign to crowdfund the production of an unauthorized adaptation of "Pinfall." The production ultimately did not proceed.

In 2016, "Pinfall" was adapted into an EC Comics-style comic book by artist Jason Mayoh which was packaged with a limited-edition Blu-ray release of Creepshow 2 by Arrow Video, with 3,000 units released. Artwork from the comic was gifted to Romero by Mayoh; it is now held in the George A. Romero Archival Collection of the University of Pittsburgh University Library System.

== See also ==
- George A. Romero filmography
- Stephen King short fiction bibliography
- Unpublished and uncollected works by Stephen King
