= Tales from the Darkside: The Movie =

1990 film by John Harrison

- Theatrical release poster
- Directed by: John Harrison
- Screenplay by: Michael McDowell; George A. Romero
- Based on: "Lot No. 249" by Arthur Conan Doyle; "The Cat from Hell" by Stephen King; "Yuki-onna" by Lafcadio Hearn
- Produced by: Richard P. Rubinstein; Mitchell Galin
- Starring: Deborah Harry; Christian Slater; David Johansen; William Hickey; James Remar; Rae Dawn Chong
- Cinematography: Robert Draper
- Edited by: Harry B. Miller III
- Music by: Donald A. Rubinstein; Jim Manzie; Pat Regan; Chaz Jankel; John Harrison
- Production company: Laurel Productions
- Distributed by: Paramount Pictures
- Release date: May 4, 1990
- Running time: 93 minutes
- Country: United States
- Language: English
- Budget: $6 million
- Box office: $16.3 million

Tales from the Darkside: The Movie is a 1990 American comedy horror anthology film directed by John Harrison and written by Michael McDowell and George A. Romero, serving as a spin-off of the anthology television series Tales from the Darkside (1984–1988) created by Romero. The film is structured around a frame story of a kidnapped paperboy who relates three tales of horror to a suburban witch who is preparing to eat him. Its cast includes Deborah Harry, Christian Slater, David Johansen, William Hickey, James Remar, Rae Dawn Chong, Matthew Lawrence, Robert Sedgwick, Steve Buscemi, Julianne Moore (in her film debut), and Robert Klein.

Tales from the Darkside: The Movie was released theatrically by Paramount Pictures on May 4, 1990. It was a moderate commercial success and received mixed reviews from critics.

== Plot ==
=== Prologue ===
The film opens with an affluent suburban housewife and modern-day witch named Betty, who plans a dinner party for her fellow witches. The main dish is to be Timmy, a young boy whom she has captured and chained up in her pantry. To stall her from cooking him, the boy tells her three stories from a book she gave him, titled Tales from the Darkside.

=== Lot 249 ===
Graduate student Edward Bellingham has been cheated by two classmates, Susan and Lee, who framed him for theft to ruin his chances of winning a scholarship for which they were competing. As revenge, Bellingham reanimates a mummy and uses it to murder them.

Susan's brother Andy kidnaps Bellingham, forces him to summon the mummy, then destroys it and burns its remains. He also burns what he believes to be the reanimation parchment. He considers killing Bellingham, but in the end cannot bring himself to commit real murder.

However, Bellingham resurrects Susan and Lee (having switched the reanimation parchment with a similar one) and dispatches them to Andy's dorm. They greet the terrified Andy by saying that Bellingham sends his regards.

=== The Cat from Hell ===
Drogan, a wealthy old man who uses a wheelchair, brings in a hitman named Halston for a bizarre hire: kill a black cat, which Drogan believes is murderously evil. Drogan explains that there were three other occupants of his house before the cat arrived: his sister, Amanda, her friend Carolyn, and the family's butler, Richard Gage. Drogan claims that one by one, the cat killed the other three, and that he is next. Drogan's pharmaceutical company killed 5,000 cats while testing a new drug, and he is convinced that this black cat is here to exact cosmic revenge.

Halston does not believe the story, but is more than willing to eliminate the cat since Drogan is offering $100,000. But when Drogan returns to the house to see if the deed is done, he finds that the cat has killed Halston by climbing down his throat. The cat emerges from the hitman's corpse and jumps at Drogan, giving him a fatal heart attack.

=== Lover's Vow ===
Preston is a struggling artist. He lives in a studio with a skylight, through which a large stone gargoyle on the neighboring building peers down. Preston's agent calls, asking to meet with him at a bar a few blocks away. The agent tells Preston that his artwork is unpopular and not selling. Dejected, Preston drinks heavily and at the end of the night, the bar owner who is a friend of his, offers to walk him home.

Along the way, Preston stops to relieve himself in a back alley, when his friend sees and shoots at a gargoyle monster. The creature attacks, severing his hand and then decapitating him. Terrified, Preston tries to run away, but the creature corners him and speaks, agreeing to spare his life if he swears never to reveal what he has seen. The monster scratches Preston's chest, saying "Cross your heart?", then vanishes.

Preston runs into another alley where he bumps into a lone woman named Carola. She claims to have become lost while going to meet friends and was searching for a taxi. Preston convinces her to call a taxi from his apartment, where Carola cleans the gargoyle-inflicted wound on his chest, and they have sex.

Preston's life soon improves, and his struggling art career becomes wildly successful, mostly thanks to Carola's connections. They eventually marry and have two children. Preston is still tormented by memories of the gargoyle though, and his vow of silence weighs heavily on him. On the tenth anniversary of him first meeting Carola, Preston breaks down and tells her about the monster. Carola appears uncomfortable by his revelation and then emits a heartbroken wail, "You promised you'd never tell!", revealing herself as the creature that killed his friend.

With Preston's vow broken, Carola can no longer remain human and begins transforming back into a gargoyle. Their children are screaming in the bedroom as they also transform into gargoyles. Carola, now fully transformed, wraps her wings around Preston and the couple proclaim their love for each other, but with the vow broken, Carola is still reluctantly forced to kill him by ripping his throat out, before flying away with her gargoyle children. The final scene shows the three gargoyles now turned to stone and sitting upon the building ledge, staring down at the city with sorrowful expressions.

=== Epilogue ===
Betty remarks that Timmy saved the best story for last, but he says that the next one is best, and has a happy ending. She replies that none of the stories in the book have happy endings and it is too late as she has to start cooking him. As Betty advances on Timmy, he narrates his own actions: throwing some marbles on the floor, causing her to slip and fall on her butcher's block and impaling her on her own tools. Timmy releases himself and pushes her into her own oven. The film ends with Timmy helping himself to a cookie and breaking the fourth wall by saying "Don't you just love happy endings?"

== Cast ==
Wraparound Story

- Deborah Harry as Betty
- Matthew Lawrence as Timmy
- David Forrester as The Priest
- Bryan Thomas Norton as Boy on Bicycle

Lot 249

- Steve Buscemi as Edward Bellingham
- Julianne Moore as Susan Smith
- Christian Slater as Andy Smith
- Robert Sedgwick as Lee Monckton
- Donald Van Horn as Moving Man
- Michael Deak as The Mummy
- George Guidall as Museum Director
- Kathleen Chalfant as Dean
- Ralph Marrero as The Cabbie

Cat from Hell

- William Hickey as Drogan
- David Johansen as Halston
- Paul Greeno as The Cabbie
- Alice Drummond as Carolyn
- Dolores Sutton as Amanda
- Mark Margolis as Gage

Lover's Vow

- James Remar as Preston
- Rae Dawn Chong as Carola
- Robert Klein as Wyatt
- Ashton Wise as Jer
- Philip Lenkowsky as Maddox
- Joe Dabenigno as Cop No. 1
- Larry Silvestri as Cop No. 2
- Donna Davidge as Gallery Patron
- Nicole Rochelle as Margaret
- Daniel Harrison as John

== Production ==
Tales from the Darkside: The Movie was a film adaptation of the TV series of the same name, a horror anthology series created by George A. Romero in the wake of his success with the anthology film Creepshow (1982). Romero and author Stephen King had previously collaborated on both Creepshow and Creepshow 2 (1987), but did not return for the third installment, Creepshow 3 (2006). Subsequently, some, including Creepshow series effects artist Tom Savini, have referred to Tales From the Darkside: The Movie as the true Creepshow 3, due to its similar tone, feel and production ties to the first two films. Director John Harrison had previously worked with Romero on many projects, including the Tales from the Darkside TV series and Creepshow, providing the musical score for the latter.

The first segment is an adaptation of Sir Arthur Conan Doyle's 1892 short story "Lot No. 249", written by Michael McDowell. The second segment is an adaptation of Stephen King's 1977 short story "The Cat from Hell", written by George A. Romero. The third and final segment is based on the second segment from Masaki Kobayashi's horror epic Kwaidan (1964), itself an adaptation of the Yuki-onna tale from Lafcadio Hearn's 1904 book Kwaidan: Stories and Studies of Strange Things. This makes Kwaidan the first Japanese horror film with an American remake. The Tales from the Darkside version was also written by McDowell.

"The Cat from Hell"—as well as another King story, Pinfall—was originally going to appear in Creepshow 2 but was scrapped, due to budgetary reasons.

== Reception ==
Tales from the Darkside: The Movie was a modest box office success for Paramount Pictures. The film was released on May 4, 1990, in the United States, opening in third place that weekend. It grossed a total of $16,324,573 domestically.

The film received mixed reviews from critics. It has a rating of 50% on the ratings aggregation site Rotten Tomatoes, based on 26 reviews. On Metacritic, the film has a rating of 54 out of 100, based on 13 critics, indicating "mixed or average reviews".

Los Angeles Times writer Michael Wilmington criticized Harrison's directing choices ("too much ritzy film noir styling and self-conscious comic book frames") but said "there's more brain than usual beneath the blood and guts". The Washington Post panned the film, calling it a "lame effort". TV Guide deemed the film a "Dull, derivative horror anthology", finding it to be "overrun with flashy camerawork and film noir stylistic flourishes that pad, rather than propel, the already weak stories offered."

In retrospective reviews, Odie Henderson of Slant Magazine observed that "Each mini-movie has the same tally of moments of greatness, grossness, and dullness, giving Tales from the Darkside: The Movie an even-handed feel", adding, "Wraparound story notwithstanding, they want you to root for the underdog, even if the underdog represents evil." Padraig Cotter of Screen Rant noted that, while the film "wasn't a huge hit, it was an effective, entertaining anthology", and agreed with the notion that it was the true successor to Creepshow 2.

== Planned sequel ==
Laurel Productions initially announced a sequel to the film in October 1990. A screenplay was written by the first film's screenwriters, Michael McDowell and George Romero, along with Gahan Wilson. Segments planned included an adaptation of Robert Bloch's "Almost Human", alongside adaptations of King's short stories "Pinfall" (originally planned for Creepshow 2) and "Rainy Season". This sequel, however, never came to fruition.
