= Klown Kamp Massacre =

- Directed by: David C. Valdez; Philip H. R. Gunn
- Written by: Philip H.R. Gunn; David C. Valdez
- Produced by: Philip H.R. Gunn; Darren Gunn; Armando Kirwin
- Starring: Jared Herholtz; Ross Kelly
- Cinematography: Luis M. Robinson
- Edited by: David C. Valdez; Philip H. R. Gunn
- Music by: Kaleb Wentzel-Fisher
- Production company: I Can't Believe It's Not Hollywood! Entertainment
- Distributed by: Troma Entertainment
- Release date: May 4, 2010
- Running time: 84 minutes
- Country: United States
- Language: English

Klown Kamp Massacre is a 2010 American horror film written and directed by Philip H. R. Gunn and David Valdez.

== Plot ==
On May 15, 1991, after massacring the entirety of Bonzo's Ranch, Edwin the Clown tapes a confession to send to his mother, showing all the people he murdered in various comedic ways.

15 years later, Edwin is watching television and sees Bonzo announcing the reopening of Clown Camp at his ranch, sending Edwin into a rage.

Clowns Vinnie and Lenny Boboski enter a gas station to buy food and supplies before heading to Bonzo's Ranch. Outside, they meet up with Tipsy and Brandi before being stopped by Crazy Ernie, telling them not to go to "Camp Sparkling Lake" since there is a "Death Curse" with a man wearing a football helmet stalking the place. Brandi tells him that they are going to Bonzo's Ranch.

Philbert then appears, walking into the camp meeting other students, Puff and Squirts.

Edwin picks up a female hippy clown also headed to Bonzo's Ranch, who gets high in his magic clown car, and after he drives past the ranch, he drives into a field and goes around in a small circle so quickly, his car window crushes her head. At the camp, the students wait for the first lesson until Sergeant Thaddeus Funnybones the Third arrives and introduces himself as their teacher. Another teacher, Tex (a rodeo clown), shows no faith in their abilities.

Tex is still baling hay when Edwin sabotages the machine with a whoopee cushion. When Tex investigates and takes it out, he is shoved inside the hay packer alive and comes out a bloody mess. For the next lesson, all the students watch a slideshow on clowns' history, including clowning being "the second oldest profession in history" behind prostitution. During the lesson, Philbert tries flirting with Valerie. Later that night, around a campfire, Buzter Pie tells the story of Edwin the Clown, how he went to Bonzo's Ranch fifteen years ago to follow his dreams of becoming a circus clown but failed every class. On the last day of camp, Edwin has one final chance to succeed: stand-up comedy. He gets another student to join him on stage, intending for him to sit on a whoopee cushion his mother gave him, but just as the student sits on it, another student in the audience answers his phone when it loudly rings, ruining his act. Edwin begs for another chance, only for the others to yell at him and pelt him with pies until he runs off. The next day, he commits his massacre, dumps the bodies into Sparkling Lake, and then goes into hiding.

The next day, the students gather around when Squirts shows Valerie one of his perverted jokes, which gives her a PTSD flashback of when her father raped her as a child. Philbert tries to comfort her when she runs off, only to be told she does not want to be a clown and that Bonzo wanted her to be one since she is his granddaughter. They arrive late to the next lesson, pie throwing. Sergeant Funnybones punishes Philbert by forcing him and Puff to move a barrel of Seltzer up a hill but abandon it after Buzter Pie and Puff get into a fight. They stumble across where Edwin has been staying and quickly leave. Sergeant Funnybones later finds the barrel abandoned.

Suddenly, Edwin the Clown starts laughing at him, and Sergeant Funnybones chases him until he gets stabbed through his face. Back at the camp, Edwin finally finds Bonzo and hangs him inside his bathroom after taking his prescription medicine to make it look like a suicide, so no one will think he killed anyone yet. Philbert then meets up with Valerie again, where she thanks him for comforting her after the pie range incident, and he offers her to join him later with his friends to drink beer though she initially declines.

Brandi and Tipsy sneak off to have sex in a private bedroom, during which Edwin makes a noise to force Tipsy to investigate when Brandi gets scared so Edwin can decapitate her with a hatchet off-screen without Tipsy knowing. Edwin also slits Squirts' throat while he masturbates watching them through their window. Tipsy then starts having sex with her dead body, not knowing due to the lack of lights, until Edwin shows him her severed head and then kills him off-camera. Philbert returns to Puff and Buzter Pie with beer and prostitutes. The next day, during Bananas' seltzer spraying lesson, the last living teacher, Edwin, switches Lenny's seltzer sprayer with acid, which melts off most of Vinnie's face, though he survives. Lenny runs off, horrified at thinking he accidentally killed his friend, until he finds a whipped cream pie in the middle of a field and starts eating it, not seeing a stick of dynamite sticking out of it until it blows up his head.

Crazy Ernie tries to get to Bonzo's Ranch as fast as possible to warn them about Edwin, only to arrive at Camp Sparkling Lake, where he meets the football helmet-wearing murderer. He gets hit by a car off-screen, making the unnamed murderer sadly walk back to his camp. The remaining students at Bonzo's Ranch try their best to take care of Vinnie even though it is doubtful he will survive. Butzer finally finds Bonzo's hanging body and discovers Edwin is at the camp murdering everyone. Puff, Philbert, and Valerie stay at the camp to try and take care of Vinnie while Butzer and Gerald try to escape. Edwin quickly finds them, and after Butzer abandons him, Gerald tries reasoning with Edwin only to have his head smashed with a high striker game mallet. Edwin then finds Buzter and punches through his chest, ripping out his heart.

While Philbert tries to comfort Valerie while she mourns over Bonzo, he sits down on Edwin's whoopee cushion, discovering he is close. They run to check on Vinnie when they hear a glass break, finding him resting. However, Edwin comes out of the closet, attacks the four with a knife, and accidentally finishes off Vinnie when he stabs him in the chest. Valerie and Philbert escape while Edwin captures Puff. Valerie stops running after a while to reveal that when she was young, she shot and killed her father in self-defense when he tried to rape her once again. Bonzo framed a gardener who could not speak English, bribed the judge, and lied to reporters to save his reputation. However, Valerie feels like the deaths of everyone at the camp are her fault since if Bonzo had won his TV show, he would have never reopened the camp, and Edwin's murders would have never happened. Edwin appears in his magic car again and starts chasing the two down until they split up, and he goes after Philbert, who hides in a tree, but Edwin's car can fly, and he runs Philbert over while in the tree.

Valerie unknowingly runs off to Edwin's hiding place to seek help. Meanwhile, Edwin returns home with all of the bodies stored in his car, and when he hears Valerie cry out, "Oh my god!" when she finds the pie and knife used to kill Sergeant Funnybones, he goes inside to investigate. He chases her around his home until she is cornered in the basement. Bananas attempts to save Valerie and successfully fights Edwin until he pushes Bananas against a wall and snaps his neck. Valerie tries escaping again but slips on Banana's banana and knocks herself out. When she wakes up, Valerie finds herself chained to the wall. When she asks why Edwin is doing this, he says this is his second chance at becoming a real clown. A phone rings: it is Bonzo's phone. Edwin angrily crushes Bonzo's skull with a mic stand before he starts sawing an assistant in half. He wheels out Puff, and Edwin saws through him until he dies. He makes Valerie, his assistant, sit down on his whoopee cushion for his final act.

A crowd starts laughing, revealing that the movie's events were all one big and elaborate prank TV show, You've Been Clown'd! with Valerie as the winner. Edwin was none other than Vic Vickers. During the credits, Valerie is last seen in a catatonic state, having been committed to an asylum. The real Edwin the Clown watches this on TV and angrily exclaims that he will kill all of them for doing this to her.

== Cast ==
- Jared Herholtz as Edwin
- Mike Miller as Bonzo
- Miguel Martinez as Sergeant Thaddeus Funnybones the Third
- Lloyd Kaufman as Vic Vickers
- Chris Payne as Puff
- Isaac Kappy as Buzter Pie
- Ross Kelly as Philbert
- Kerri Duabe as Valerie
- Daniel Gutierrez as Gerald
- Sandor Gattyan as Squirts
- Kevin R. Elder as Crazy Ernie/Flopsy McCool
- Tara Hahn as Brandi
- Jon Boltz as Valerie's Father
- Chad Brummett as Tex
- Nick Lopez as Vinnie
- Reuben Finkelstein as Lenny Bobowski
- Matt Sanford as Tipsy
- Henry Atencio as Judge
- George Bach as Unsolved Clown Murders Host
- Melissa Collins as Edwin's Mom (Voice)
- Peter Lane as Football Killer

== Reception ==
HorrorNews.net gave the film a favourable review mentioning that it "delivers the gore while maintaining a tongue-in-cheek atmosphere. Jeremy Biltz from DVD Talk gave the film 3/5 stars, writing, "Klown Kamp Massacre is a film that goes for the gag with delighted abandon, and doesn't really care what taboos or sacred cows it runs down in the process. It's not exactly a high quality endeavor, but it delivers enough laughs and fun gore effects that it works for the thin slice of the slasher comedy genre it's aiming at."
