= The Rabbit Factory =

2006 novel by Marshall Karp

- Cover of the hardcover novel
- Author: Marshall Karp
- Language: English
- Publisher: MacAdam/Cage
- Publication date: April 28, 2006
- Publication place: United States
- Pages: 632 pp (Hardcover)
- ISBN: 1-59692-174-9
- OCLC: 62889017
- Dewey Decimal: 813/.54 22
- LC Class: PS3561.A684 R33 2006
- Followed by: Bloodthirsty

The Rabbit Factory (2006) is the first novel by author Marshall Karp. It recounts the investigation by detectives Mike Lomax and Terry Biggs as they explore a series of murders directed at a fictional company Lamaar, a parody of Disney. First is the murder of the man wearing the "Rambunctious Rabbit" costume in the theme park (this is depicted on the book's cover).

Karp published additional novels featuring Lomax and Biggs: Bloodthirsty (2007), Flipping Out (2009), and Cut, Paste, Kill (2010).

In 2010, screenwriter Allan Loeb wrote an adaptation of the novel as a proposed television pilot at TNT. The script was known as the "Untitled Allan Loeb Project." The TV pilot was produced in the fall of 2010 with Steven Weber and D.L. Hughley cast in the lead roles. Loeb was the pilot's executive producer and James Sadwith directed. By June 2011 TNT announced that they had passed on the pilot and would not order more episodes for a full season.

== Reception ==
Janet Maslin, writing for The New York Times, gave the book a mixed review, stating that the author is "good at what he does. And he conveys a sense of enjoyment." However, the review also criticized the book's reliance on popular genre conventions, and wished that it was "better at avoiding the generic."

Kirkus Reviews similarly gave a mixed review, summarizing the book as "a bloated piece of work, devoted more to the pleasure of reading than the offer of a dazzling dénouement."
