= Wishmaster (film) =

1997 film

- Theatrical release poster
- Directed by: Robert Kurtzman
- Written by: Peter Atkins
- Produced by: Pierre David; Clark Peterson; Noël A. Zanitsch
- Starring: Tammy Lauren; Andrew Divoff; Kane Hodder; Tony Todd; Robert Englund
- Cinematography: Jacques Haitkin
- Edited by: David Handman
- Music by: Harry Manfredini
- Distributed by: Live Entertainment
- Release date: September 19, 1997
- Running time: 90 minutes
- Country: United States
- Language: English
- Budget: $5 million
- Box office: $15.7 million

Wishmaster is a 1997 American dark fantasy horror film directed by Robert Kurtzman. It is the first installment of the Wishmaster film series. The film was executive produced by Wes Craven, and is the only film of the Wishmaster series with his name attached. Its plot concerns a djinn, a wish-granting, evil genie who is released from a jewel and seeks to capture the soul of the woman who discovered him, thereby opening a portal and freeing his fellow djinn to inhabit and enslave the Earth.

The film stars Andrew Divoff, as The Djinn, and Tammy Lauren.

The film was followed by three sequels, Wishmaster 2: Evil Never Dies (1999), Wishmaster 3: Beyond the Gates of Hell (2001) and Wishmaster: The Prophecy Fulfilled (2002).

== Plot ==
In 1127, a djinn asks a Persian emperor to make his second wish. When the emperor wishes to see wonders, the Djinn uses his powers to torture and mutilate people in the palace. The emperor is horrified, but the Djinn tells him to use his third wish to set things right. Before the emperor can make his third wish, a sorcerer explains the consequences of the third wish, as it will free legions of djinn on Earth. He then reveals a fire opal, which pulls the Djinn inside and traps him.

In present-day America, Raymond Beaumont supervises workers lowering a large crate containing an antique statue of Ahura Mazda onto a ship. The crane operator, Mickey Torelli, is drunk and drops the crate, killing Beaumont's assistant Ed Finney and destroying the statue. A dockworker steals the fire opal from the rubble and pawns it. Eventually, the jewel reaches Regal Auctioneers, where Nick Merritt instructs appraiser Alexandra "Alex" Amberson to examine it, which wakes the Djinn. Alex sees something inside the jewel and leaves it with her close friend and colleague, Josh Aickman, to analyze. As he collects data, the gem explodes, destroying the lab and releasing the Djinn. Josh, wounded, wishes for relief from his physical pain, and the Djinn grants his wish by killing him.

Alex, having been informed of Josh's death by Lieutenant Nathanson, tracks the gem to the statue which she tracks to Beaumont, who sends Alex to visit Wendy Derleth, a folklore professor. Wendy explains the history of the gem and the nature of the djinn: a djinn grants wishes in exchange for souls, but as djinns are demonic in nature, the wishes will be twisted into curses for the djinn's amusement. Alex learns that the Djinn needs to power the gem with human souls and then grant her (the person who originally released him) three wishes before he can open the gateway to release his fellow djinn on Earth.

Meanwhile, the Djinn takes the form of a dead man and uses the name Nathaniel Demerest. He kills a pharmacist with the wish of a vengeful vagrant and grants sales clerk Ariella's wish for eternal beauty by turning her into a mannequin. Searching for Alex, he goes to Nathanson to gain her information. Nathanson refuses to help him, but the Djinn grants Nathanson's wish to easily prove a criminal's guilt by having the criminal go on a shooting spree inside the police precinct, and in the chaos finds Alex's home address and leaves. The Djinn next visits Nick. Nick agrees to help in exchange for a million dollars, which he receives when his mother takes out a life insurance policy and is killed in a plane explosion.

Alex sees troubling visions every time the Djinn grants wishes. She consults Derleth again but realizes she is actually talking to the Djinn, who has killed Derleth and taken her form. The Djinn confronts Alex and offers her three wishes. In the spirit of fair play, he offers her a "free" wish, to see what will happen. She wishes for him to shoot himself, but he is immortal and the gunshot fails to harm him. Using the first of her three official wishes, Alex wishes to know what he is. The Djinn teleports her to his hellish world within the gem where the souls of his victims are tortured which terrifies her as he boasts of his evil to her. She then wishes to escape back to her apartment, alone.

The Djinn threatens Alex's sister, Shannon, so Alex hurries to a party to which Beaumont had invited Alex and Shannon. The Djinn follows, again disguised as Demerest. Alex tells doorman Johnny Valentine to hold the Djinn, as he is trying to kill her; however, the Djinn manipulates Valentine into making a wish "to escape his routine life," allowing the Djinn to kill Valentine, making his way into the party. The Djinn charms Beaumont, who wishes his party would be unforgettable. The Djinn causes the artwork in his party to come to life and kill Beaumont, the guests, and the security guards called in to help. The Djinn corners the sisters and attempts to scare Alex into making her third wish by trapping Shannon in a burning painting.

Alex wishes that crane operator Mickey Torelli had not been drinking on the job two days ago, which the Djinn is forced to grant. This undoes the events that followed the statue's destruction and traps the Djinn in the fire opal once again, as the now-sober Torelli lowers the crate without problems. Alex visits Josh, who is now alive again, and notices that Alex seems pleased with herself, though she does not explain why. Inside the jewel in the statue of Ahura Mazda, now in Beaumont's private collection, the Djinn sits on a throne, waiting to be released.

== Cast ==
Main cast

- Tammy Lauren as Alexandra Amberson
- Andrew Divoff as The Djinn / Nathaniel Demerest
- Robert Englund as Raymond Beaumont
- Chris Lemmon as Nick Merritt
- Wendy Benson as Shannon Amberson
- Tony Crane as Josh Aickman
- Jenny O'Hara as Wendy Derleth
- Ricco Ross as Lieutenant Nathanson
- Gretchen Palmer as Ariella
- John Byner as Doug Clegg

Cameos

- Angus Scrimm as narrator (voice only)
- George "Buck" Flower as Homeless Man
- Ted Raimi as Ed Finney
- Kane Hodder as Merritt's Guard
- Tony Todd as Johnny Valentine
- Reggie Bannister as Pharmacist
- Joseph Pilato as Mickey Torelli
- Dennis Hayden as Security Guard

== Production ==
The film began as an idea by Live Entertainment who wanted to establish an evil genie as a Freddy Krueger-esque monster that they could build a franchise around. In order to develop the franchise, Live hired Peter Atkins, a writer known for his work on the Hellraiser sequels, to develop a screenplay. Live furnished Atkins with several Xeroxes of Encyclopedia entries and books concerning the mythology around the Djinn from Eastern culture with some sources describing the Djinn as a race made by God after Angels but before Humans who unlike Angels in Heaven and Humans on Earth were not given a home by God and served as the source of their malevolence towards mankind. In approaching how the Djinn would be depicted, Atkins wanted to portray the character in a manner similar to Pinhead where he spoke in an articulate manner and favorably compared Andrew Divoff with Doug Bradley for being able to deliver his "high-falutin’, piss-elegant, pretentious verbiage" in a manner that was flamboyant and larger than life without devolving into Camp. The film marked the sophomore directing effort of effects artist Robert Kurtzman, following The Demolitionist.

=== Casting and cameos ===
Wishmaster is notable for featuring many actors from popular horror films. Kurtzman was able to secure many of the cameos thanks to his prolific effects work in the horror genre. Robert Englund, who was Freddy Krueger in the Nightmare on Elm Street series, played an antique collector, and Kane Hodder, who played Jason Voorhees in the Friday the 13th series, played a security guard. Also in the film were Tony Todd from Candyman; Ted Raimi from Candyman, Darkman, Evil Dead II and Army of Darkness; Ricco Ross from Aliens; Joseph Pilato from Day of the Dead; Reggie Bannister and the voice of Angus Scrimm (from the Phantasm films); Jenny O'Hara from the later Devil; actor Jack Lemmon's son Chris Lemmon from Just Before Dawn; and George 'Buck' Flower (who was often used in small parts in various horror movies of the 1980s and early 1990s, often directed by John Carpenter). Verne Troyer of later Austin Powers fame appears as the smaller Wishmaster when he first escapes from his gem prison. A Pazuzu statue, a personification of the demonic figure which possessed Linda Blair's character in The Exorcist series, also appeared. This can be seen in Beaumont's collection room and on display during the party scene where it attacks some of the guests, though it is not formally referenced. A veiled reference to the Cthulhu Mythos can be heard in the incantation used to imprison the Djinn; the words "Nib Shuggurath", a spoonerism of Shub-Niggurath. Another Lovecraft reference appears in the character name of Wendy Derleth (Jenny O'Hara); August Derleth (1909-1971) was a publisher and anthologist who was the first book publisher of the writings of H.P. Lovecraft, and a long-time contributor of new works in the Cthulu Mythos. Makeup artist Tom Savini is mistaken to cameo in the pharmacy; however, Robert Kurtzman has debunked that claim stating that it was just an extra that got cast that looks like him.

Many crew members, including director Robert Kurtzman (man killed by piano), had small cameos in the film.

Tammy Lauren said she was attracted to the script due to her character's battle against the Djinn being a more psychological than physical altercation which she found more thematically rich.

=== Writing ===
Screenwriter Peter Atkins, who had previously worked on the Hellraiser films, incorporated references to horror and fantasy writers into the names of several characters. In a 2016 retrospective for Bloody Disgusting, Daniel Baldwin identified the surnames Beaumont, Finney, Etchison and Derleth, as well as a reference to a "Professor Leiber", as allusions to genre authors.

== Reception ==
=== Box office ===
Wishmaster was shot on an estimated budget of US$5 million and its total domestic gross was US$15,738,769. During its opening weekend in theaters, 19–21 September 1997, Wishmaster made US$6 million, putting it in third place at the box office, behind In & Out (which was debuting in first place) and The Game (which was in second place during its second week).

=== Critical response ===
The film was negatively received overall by critics. On Rotten Tomatoes it has an approval rating of 25% based on 32 reviews, with an average rating of 3.97/10. The site's consensus reads: "Wishmaster searches for horror in the exploits of a supernatural being—one whose powers, alas, evidently do not include the ability to summon a compelling script".

Peter Stack of the San Francisco Chronicle called it "an extravaganza of bad special effects and worse acting". Of the few positive reviews, The Times of Northwest Indiana critic Christopher Sheid gave it a B+ and stated that "considering that the djinn itself is essentially a combination of Pinhead and Freddy, it's safe to say "Wishmaster" is a movie respectful of its influences. It's also respectful of its audience's intelligence, which is to say this shocker doesn't bore us with the pretense of trying to be smart ... You couldn't wish for a better low-budget fright flick."

== Sequel ==
A sequel titled Wishmaster 2: Evil Never Dies, was released in 1999.

== Novelization ==
In 2020, an official novelization of the film was written by Christian Francis and published by Encyclopocalypse Publications.
