= Creepshow 2 =

1987 American comedy horror anthology film

- Theatrical release poster
- Directed by: Michael Gornick
- Screenplay by: George A. Romero
- Based on: Stories by Stephen King
- Produced by: David Ball
- Starring: Lois Chiles; George Kennedy; Dorothy Lamour; Tom Savini
- Cinematography: Richard Hart; Tom Hurwitz
- Edited by: Peter Weatherley
- Music by: Les Reed; Rick Wakeman
- Production company: Laurel Entertainment
- Distributed by: New World Pictures
- Release date: May 1, 1987
- Running time: 89 minutes
- Country: United States
- Language: English
- Budget: $4.1 million
- Box office: $14 million

Creepshow 2 is a 1987 American comedy horror anthology film directed by Michael Gornick, and the sequel to Creepshow. Gornick was previously the cinematographer of the first film, and the screenplay was written by George A. Romero who was director of the original film. It consists of three story segments and an animated wraparound. Like the first film, the segments are based on stories written by Stephen King.

The film's ensemble cast features Lois Chiles, George Kennedy, Dorothy Lamour, Tom Savini, and Holt McCallany (in his film debut), and features Stephen King in a cameo appearance.

Creepshow 2 was released by New World Pictures on 1 May 1987. It received mixed critical reviews, but was a commercial success. A sequel without Romero or King's involvement, Creepshow 3, was released in 2006.

== Plot ==
=== Prologue ===
In the small town of Dexter, Maine, a delivery truck pulls up to a newsstand. Billy, a young boy, eagerly follows the truck on his bike. The truck's back shutter opens to reveal the Creep, who drops off copies of the latest issue of Creepshow (which has the same cover as the comic in the final scene of the previous film) before vanishing. It cuts to animation Billy picks up an issue and begins to read it. At his castle, the Creep welcomes the kiddies to another edition of Creepshow. With them being loyal to the "core", they wouldn't want to be dead wood as it becomes the subject of the first story.

=== Old Chief Wood'nhead ===
In a small town called Dead River, Ray and Martha Spruce are an elderly couple who run the small town's general store, whose décor includes a cigar store Indian named "Old Chief Wood'nhead." The Spruces are visited by Benjamin Whitemoon, the elder of a local Native American tribe, who gives them a bag of turquoise jewelry, his tribe's sacred treasures, as collateral for the debt the tribe has incurred, despite Ray's objections.

Later that night, the Spruces are robbed by Benjamin's estranged ne'er-do-well nephew Sam Whitemoon, armed with a shotgun, and his two friends, Andy Cavanaugh and Vince “Fat Stuff” Gribbens. Sam, who has long black hair, dreams of taking the jewels and moving to Hollywood to become a movie star. In a struggle, Sam's gun goes off and fires at Martha, killing her. Sam shoots and kills Ray as well before grabbing the jewels and driving away with the others. After they leave, Old Chief Wood'nhead comes to life and goes after the thugs to avenge the Spruces. He shoots Vince with multiple arrows, slaughters Andy with a tomahawk after smashing up his car, and uses a hunting knife to scalp Sam upon cornering him at his home. The next morning, Benjamin wakes up to find the turquoise jewelry on his bed. He visits the ruined store to find Old Chief Wood'nhead back on the porch, holding Sam's bloody scalp and a bloodstained knife, with fresh war paint on his face. Now aware of what has happened to the Spruces and what Old Chief Wood'nhead had done to the killers, Benjamin wishes the old warrior a peaceful afterlife and drives away. The final scene turns to a panel as the Creep commented that was quite a price for young Sam Whitemoon "to pay... toupée, eh?"

=== Interlude 1 ===
At the town post office, Billy receives a package from the clerk, Mr. Haig, that supposedly contains a product advertised in his comic: The bulb for a meat-eating Venus flytrap. Billy pays for the package and sets off for home. With the kiddies still here, the Creep appears from behind the post office counter stating that if Old Chief Wood'nhead didn't drive them away, the next story will.

=== The Raft ===
In mid-October, four college students, Deke, Laverne, Randy, and Rachel, arrive at Cascade Beach, a desolate lake far from civilization, for some fun. While swimming to a wooden raft in the middle of the lake, Randy witnesses a duck being pulled under the water by an unseen force. Once all four students are on the raft, they discover what Randy was so nervous about: a large, black, blob-like creature resembling an oil slick floating on the surface of the water. As Rachel leans over the raft to try and touch the creature, it grabs hold of Rachel, pulls her into the lake, and digests her. The three panicking students remember that it's currently the off-season, meaning that there is no caretaker to rescue them anytime soon.

As time passes, Deke plans to swim to shore so he can bring back help. Before he can make a break for it, however, the blob seeps through the raft's cracks, grabs Deke by the foot, and pulls him through the raft, killing him. Noting that the creature is still hungry, Randy and Laverne manage to evade the creature as it tries to grab them from under the raft. When night falls, Randy and Laverne take turns watching for the creature, then eventually fall asleep in each other's arms.

The next morning, Randy awakens and begins to kiss Laverne. He lays Laverne on the raft and begins removing her shirt, neglecting the creature. Laverne then awakens, screaming in agony; the creature has seeped through the cracks and covered half of her face. As the blob pulls her off the raft and begins consuming her, a horrified Randy jumps off the raft to swim to shore. He makes it and shouts, defiantly, "I beat you!" However, the creature rears up from the water like a wave and engulfs Randy.

The blob returns to the lake, leaving no evidence of the students other than their discarded clothes and still-running car. Unknown to the students, there was a sign barely visible behind some thick vegetation that reads "No swimming." The Creep is heard quoting "Well swimmers, that was...er...slick"!

=== Interlude 2 ===
On his way back home from the post office upon returning to animation, Billy is ambushed by a gang of neighborhood bullies. The gang's leader, nicknamed Rhino, takes Billy's package, finds the Venus Flytrap bulb, and crushes it with his foot. In retaliation, Billy kicks Rhino in the groin and flees as the bullies race after him. As Billy escapes, The Creep appears from behind a tree and goes on to tell the last story.

=== The Hitch-hiker ===
Annie Lansing, an adulterous Maine businesswoman, wakes up and gets out of bed after sleeping with her gigolo lover. Annie realizes that she only has 15 minutes before her attorney husband George arrives home, so she hops into her car and races for home several miles away. A spilled ember from her cigarette causes Annie to lose control at a slippery corner, where she runs down a Dover-bound hitchhiker. Seeing that no one witnessed the incident, Annie takes off and doesn't look back. Shortly after she leaves, however, the area is crowded with a truck driver, a pair of passersby, and George, who reports the hit-and-run to the police.

Miles away, Annie thinks about what she has done and briefly considers turning herself in but ultimately concludes that no one has anything on her and thinks that everything will be fine. Before she can continue, however, the hitchhiker suddenly appears outside her window and utters "Thanks for the ride, lady!", a line he repeats throughout the story. Annie speeds off in terror, but the hitchhiker reaches through the sunroof and grabs her. She drives off the road and through the woods, where she knocks the hitchhiker off the roof with a low hanging branch. The hitchhiker appears again, opening the door to the passenger seat. Annie shoots him with a revolver multiple times but fails to kill him. She manages to kick him out of the car and run him over repeatedly. The hitchhiker then climbs onto the hood and pulls up his "DOVER" sign, which now reads "You killed me." Annie again loses control of the car and drives off the road, down a hill, and into a tree. Annie repeatedly slams the hitchhiker into the same tree, knocking herself out in the process.

A while later, Annie awakens from her accident. Not seeing the hitchhiker anywhere, Annie believes the experience was all a nightmare, so she gets back on the road and drives home, actually getting there before George. As she begins to step out of her car, the hitchhiker, gruesomely mangled and still uttering "Thanks for the ride, lady!", crawls out from under the car and attacks her. The garage door swings shut as the interior begins to fill with smoke.

Sometime later, George finally arrives home to find Annie in her still-running car, dead from carbon monoxide poisoning. The hitchhiker's bloodied "DOVER" sign sits in her lap. The Creep is heard telling the lesson about never picking up hitchhikers....on the hood of your car.

=== Epilogue ===
Inside the delivery truck upon returning to animation, the Creep prepares to drive away and bids the audience farewell, but he then spots Billy, still being chased by the bullies. Billy leads his pursuers into a vacant lot swarming with out-of-control plant growth. The bulb Rhino smashed was not the first one Billy had ordered. A quintet of giant Venus Flytraps emerge from the surrounding weeds and devour all the thugs. Shifting back to live-action, the Creep cackles in glee and drives off to deliver the latest issue of Creepshow to another town as the credits roll.

In a post-credits scene, the following text appears (as quoted by Colliers Magazine in 1949):

Juvenile delinquency is the product of pent up frustrations, stored-up resentments and bottled-up fears. It is not the product of cartoons and captions. But the comics are a handy, obvious, uncomplicated scapegoat. If the adults who crusade against them would only get as steamed up over such basic causes of delinquency as parental ignorance, indifference, and cruelty, they might discover that comic books are no more a menace than Treasure Island or Jack the Giant Killer.

== Cast ==
Wraparound Story

- Domenick John as Billy
- Tom Savini as The Creep
  - Joe Silver as The Creep (voice)
- Brian Noodt, Marc Stephan Delgatto, Jason Late, P.J. Morrison, and Clark Utterback as animation voices

Old Chief Wood'nhead

- George Kennedy as Ray Spruce
- Dorothy Lamour as Martha Spruce
- Philip Dore as Curly
- Frank Salsedo as Ben Whitemoon
- Holt McCallany as Sam Whitemoon
- David Holbrook as Vince “Fat Stuff” Gribbens
- Don Harvey as Andy Cavanaugh
- Dan Kamin as Old Chief Wood'nhead
- Dean Smith as Mr. Cavanaugh
- Shirley Sonderegger as Mrs. Cavanaugh
- Maltby Napoleon as Indian #1
- Tyrone Tonto as Indian #2

The Raft

- Paul Satterfield as Deke
- Jeremy Green as Laverne
- Daniel Beer as Randy
- Page Hannah as Rachel

The Hitchhiker

- Lois Chiles as Annie Lansing
- David Beecroft as Annie's Lover
- Tom Wright as The Hitchhiker
- Richard Parks as George Lansing
- Stephen King as Truck Driver
- Cheré Bryson as Woman at Accident

== Production ==
Where the first film consisted of five stories, Creepshow 2 features only three. Two additional King stories, "Pinfall" and "Cat from Hell", were set to be adapted in the film, but were scrapped due to budgetary reasons. "Cat from Hell" was later filmed for Tales from the Darkside: The Movie. It focuses on a wealthy old man hiring a hitman for $100,000 to kill a black cat, which was believed to have killed three other people inside the residence he lives in and fears to be next. Unbeknownst to them, the cat soon exacts cosmic revenge on the two.

"Pinfall", which was set to appear after "Old Chief Wood'nhead", told the story of two rival teams consisting of the Regi-Men and the Bad News Boors competing in a bowling alley owned by an aged millionaire. The owner is killed in a freak accident and the teams find out afterwards that he would have awarded one of them $5 million for whoever got the higher score. Soon, things take a turn for the worse for the Regi-Team when the Boors, killed in a fiery car-crash purposely caused by the Regi-Team, return as burnt-up revenants and get their revenge on their killers. Unlike "Cat from Hell", which managed to be brought onto the screen in a different film, "Pinfall" was never shot and never appeared outside of the film's original script. In 2014, the segment was funded through Kickstarter by Dayle Teegarden and was successfully pledged by its backers with £1,231 put into the project against its £1,000 goal. The segment was going to be in the sequel for Tales from the Darkside: The Movie, but this never came to fruition.

During "The Raft" segment, actor Daniel Beer stated that he almost died from hypothermia due to the water being very cold. While the crew wanted him to continue working, director Michael Gornick brought him to the hospital, as he feared the actor would leave the set and never return if they forced him to keep working. After a full recovery, he managed to finish the segment.

== Release ==
The film was theatrically released on May 1, 1987.

=== Home media ===
After its theatrical release, the film was released on VHS the same year by New World Home Video. While being released by Anchor Bay Entertainment on DVD, a special edition DVD of the film was released with the cover art being a homage to the Tales from the Crypt comic books from EC. In 2013, the film was released on Blu-ray by Image Entertainment on September 3, 2013. On December 13, 2016, Arrow Video released a special edition Blu-ray in the United States. The release contains many interviews with the cast and crew along with behind the scenes footage.

== Reception ==
=== Box office ===
On its opening weekend, it grossed $3,584,077 and has achieved $14,000,000 during its run in theaters.

=== Critical response ===
Janet Maslin of The New York Times wrote that the film "has three suitably grisly ideas that are only glancingly developed. The episodes are marginally interesting, but each is a little too long. And each could be fully explained in a one-sentence synopsis." Todd McCarthy of Variety panned the film as an "omnibus snoozefest which is utterly lacking in chills or thrills," with all three stories "so deficient in imagination and scare quotient they wouldn't pass as even satisfactory episodes on a TV show like Amazing Stories or The Twilight Zone." Kevin Thomas of the Los Angeles Times called the film "a cut-rate sequel from those two popular masters of horror, Stephen King and George Romero, that plays like leftovers. Fans of both deserve better." Richard Harrington of The Washington Post wrote that the film "goes nowhere slowly. Part of the problem is that King's short stories simply work better in print." Allmovie awarded 1.5 stars out of 5 in a retrospective review and stated: "Despite its strengths -- a livelier pace, some creatively gory set-pieces -- this is a much cheaper-looking effort than its predecessor, with the deft guidance of Romero conspicuously absent (long-time collaborator Michael Gornick took up the directorial reins); as a result, King's gross-out sensibilities don't come off as well."

On review aggregator Rotten Tomatoes, it holds a 36% approval rating based on 25 reviews as of January 2026. The site's critical consensus reads, "Not even the melding of Stephen King and George A. Romero's writing sensibilities can elevate this spineless anthology, which is too simple in its storytelling and too skimpy on the genuine scares." Metacritic, which uses a weighted average, assigned the film a score of 39 out of 100, based on 11 critics, indicating "generally unfavorable" reviews.

The Blu-ray reviews by Jake Keet and M. Enois Duarte suggests that the film "admittedly not as good as [the first Creepshow]", but it "still makes for a decent follow-up that offers a few amusing moments of horror-comedy".

== Soundtrack ==
The music to the film was composed and conducted by Les Reed and Rick Wakeman. A soundtrack album was released by Waxwork Records as a double-LP record in the United States in 2017.

== Sequel ==
Creepshow 3 was released in 2006 via Taurus Entertainment who had purchased the naming rights. The film featured no involvement whatsoever from Stephen King or George Romero and was critically panned.
