= The Stink of Flesh =

- Directed by: Scott Phillips
- Written by: Scott Phillips
- Starring: Diva, Kurly Tlapoyawa, Ross Kelly
- Music by: Chris Alexander and Carrie Eliza
- Distributed by: Tempe DVD
- Release date: 2005
- Running time: 82 min
- Country: United States
- Language: English

The Stink of Flesh is a 2005 black comedy and sexploitation film directed by Scott Phillips. It depicts a band of survivors in a zombie wasteland. The film includes a sequence of human-zombie intercourse.

== Plot ==
Dexy, a sexually insatiable woman, implores her husband Nathan to find her "someone to play with". Immediately afterward, a man armed with a one-handed sledgehammer and a number of long spikes is engaged in hand-to-hand combat with a zombie, which he ultimately kills by overpowering it and driving a spike into its head with his hammer. His name is revealed to be "Matool". He then sees another zombie approaching him, which appears to annoy him more than frighten him. He is also shown being extremely protective of his glasses, since zombies have overrun the world and he might find it difficult to acquire another pair.

As the opening credits roll, short clips are shown of Matool running around the deserted streets of Albuquerque, New Mexico, while Nathan is driving his pickup on those same streets, showing that the city is devoid of human life.

Afterward, a young woman is shown trapped in her car by a group of ravenous zombies outside, while her male companion is pulled down and devoured. Matool hears this and utters "Fuck yeah!" while rushing off to her rescue. Though she is obviously reluctant, she allows herself to be saved, but Matool is forced to resort to carrying her, as she is overcome by panic. They take refuge in a rundown, abandoned house, which is already occupied by a middle-aged man and two young boys. The older man, Mr. Rainville, seems not to be bothered much by what is happening outside, and neither does one of his young friends, but the other boy does not speak at all or show any kind of emotion. After some amusing introductions, Matool inquires as to the identity of the man who was just killed, and the young woman replies that it was her brother, much to Matool's joy, but she is incensed by his subtle advances, and still believes that they can save her now-dead brother. Rainville continues to do nothing but sit and watch as all this happens, though he does not hesitate to jump in with a witty comment about he's "not going to fuck you either" to Matool, mocking his attempts to get the young lady in bed. The woman then loses it and tries to leave to save her brother, but is pulled down and devoured by several zombies while Matool has no choice but to run. Rainville and one of the boys are eaten alive, but the quiet one simply hides, showing no emotion whatsoever.

As Matool runs, Nathan hits him with the door of his truck. Matool later wakes up bound in the back of Nathan's truck as they arrive at Nathan's house in the mountains near the city. Also in the truck is the quiet boy who Rainville had taken in (though the purposes for which he did so are implied to be carnal in nature). After being taken inside, he is cut loose, welcomed, allowed to bathe, and is bluntly informed that Nathan and Dexy have an alternative lifestyle, which involves Nathan watching while other men engage in sexual activity with Dexy. Matool is intrigued by this and goes along with the idea, but their first time, Dexy's sister Sassy smacks his bare rear with a ruler, surprising Matool, who is even more surprised when he sees that this new woman has a mutated human face on her side, the result of some kind of conjoined twins situation (the face appears to be self-aware, and is named Dottie). Matool apologizes for freaking out, seeing that Sassy is very sensitive.

After a few days, during which Matool gets used to his new surroundings, and after a few fights with zombies lurking outside, Nathan and Matool become fast friends, and Matool is shown a shed behind the house where Nathan keeps a naked female zombie that he likes to "look at", prompting Matool to remark "Yeah, she'd be pretty fucking hot if she weren't decomposing."

Shortly thereafter, a small group of soldiers arrive in the rain. Two are carrying a third, who is badly injured. Their leader is Mandel, the other is Vega, and the wounded man is Sepulveda, who talk their way inside. A flashback reveals that they were part of a larger unit surviving on the roads after the zombies overran civilization until a zombie attack (including what they call 'hyperzombies, which can move faster than normal zombies) cost them two soldiers (one, a male, was eaten alive and another, a female, was dragged screaming under their truck), and wounded Sepulveda. Mandel becomes acquainted with Matool who tells him that the house is well-supplied, has power from an electrical generator, a well, as well as "more". Sepulveda is placed in an unoccupied bedroom where Mandel and Vega take turns watching him, knowing that death and reanimation are inevitable. Also, Vega becomes acquainted with Sassy, who later admits to Mandel and Matool that the face on her side is "disturbingly sexy" (prompting Matool to call him "disturbingly weird").

Later, Mandel and Vega begin having sex with Dexy while Nathan watches, causing him obvious frustration, leading him to, while the others are having breakfast, sneak back to his shed and have rough sex with his chained female zombie. A flashback reveals that the female zombie was one of two survivors who had arrived sometime earlier (the other being a male), who, after seeing Dexy's attraction to them both, shot the man and strangled the woman, keeping her for sexual purposes.

As the days pass, Vega and Sassy begin a relationship, while Sepulveda continues to die in agony, while Mandel resists Matool's suggestion that he be put down right away. Nathan and Matool continue to fight and destroy zombies (Nathan with a Beretta pistol, Matool with his trademark hammer and spikes) as they show up at the house.

Things inevitably fall apart, however, as the quiet boy who has not yet said a word begins feeling an attraction towards Dexy, and takes Nathan's keys and frees his female zombie, leaving it contained in the shed. Meanwhile, Sepulveda wakes up and sees Sassy for the first time, as well as her conjoined twin, freaking out at how disgusting it is, causing Sassy to lose it and kill him with a pair of scissors. Mandel, who was watching Sepulveda, instinctively shoots Sassy, killing her. Nathan goes out to the shed for a tryst, but is killed and devoured by his zombie companion. Meanwhile, Matool, Mandel, and Vega take Sassy and Sepulveda's bodies out before they reanimate as zombies, while attempting to reassure Dexy that it was "an accident". Matool smashes Sassy's head with a cinder block over Vega's objections who is then attacked and killed by a reanimated Sepulveda.

As more zombies begin to gather at the house, Matool demands that Mandel go back into the house to get his MP5 submachine gun, but he can't, as the boy has locked them out. Mandel then kills the Sepulveda zombie with his knife. Then they head to the shed to find Nathan. They open the door and see him being devoured by his female zombie and proceed to lock her back in. As more and more zombies arrive, Mandel punches Matool, claiming Dexy as his own, but Matool fights back. As they fight, they find themselves surrounded and are forced to run down the same road to escape. Dexy, meanwhile, looks out the window as the zombies approach the door while the boy comes up to her, still not speaking or expressing any emotion. She looks at him and says "Nathan will be back." The boy then holds Dexy's hand.

Matool and Mandel run down a gravel road together, making their escape.

== Partial cast ==
- Kurly Tlapoyawa as Matool
- Ross Kelly as Nathan
- Diva as Dexy
- Billy Garberina as Mandel
- Kristin Hansen as Sassy
- Devin O'Leary as Vega
- Andrew Vellenoweth as Sepulveda
- Bryan Gallegos as the Quiet Boy (referred to in the credits as "Spooky Kid")
- Bob Vardeman as Mr. Rainville

== DVD extras ==
The DVD includes a 46-minute film detailing the adventures of the cast and crew over the twelve days of shooting.

Seven minutes of especially funny outtakes are featured.

There is also a ten-minute film showing the premier of The Stink of Flesh at the Guild Theater in Albuquerque, where many independent movies, especially those made in and around Albuquerque, are shown.

Also featured is a short called "Rainville, the Early Years" in which Bob Vardeman, who played Rainville, essentially goes on a random, foul-mouthed rampage while driving, walking around his front yard, petting his cat, and trying on hats for the movie.

== Soundtrack listing ==
- Score by Chris Alexander and Carrie Eliza
- I Bought You Some Roses, Walking Alone, A Love More True by Angry Johnny and the Killbillies
- Hell's what I'm used to, Through The Devils Eyes by Lonesome Kings
- Love Her with A Feel, Rio Grande Blues, Matool's Smooth Groove by Rudy "Boy" Jarmillo
- July, Sinnerman, Christine, Lakeshore by Soda and His Million Piece Band
- Code of The West, Go-Go by Boot Hill
- Sassy's Theme by Noah Wolters

== See also ==
- List of zombie films
