= The Demolitionist =

- Theatrical release poster
- Directed by: Robert Kurtzman
- Written by: Brian DiMuccio; Dino Vindeni
- Story by: Anne Kurtzman; Robert Kurtzman
- Produced by: Donald P. Borchers
- Starring: Nicole Eggert; Richard Grieco; Bruce Abbott; Heather Langenkamp; Susan Tyrrell; Peter Jason; Sarah Douglas; Tom Savini; Jack Nance
- Music by: Shawn Patterson
- Production company: A-Pix Entertainment
- Distributed by: Two Moon Releasing
- Release date: March 10, 1995
- Running time: 100 minutes
- Country: United States
- Language: English
- Budget: $1 million

The Demolitionist is a 1995 American cyberpunk superhero film directed by Robert Kurtzman. The film stars Nicole Eggert, Richard Grieco, Bruce Abbott, Heather Langenkamp, Susan Tyrrell and Tom Savini.

== Plot ==
A murdered female police officer is brought back to life by a cold-hearted scientist to serve as "The Demolitionist", the ultimate crime-fighting weapon in a city overrun by criminals and internal corruption.

== Cast ==
- Nicole Eggert as Alyssa Lloyd
- Richard Grieco as "Mad Dog" Burne
- Bruce Abbott as Professor Jack Crowley
- Heather Langenkamp as Christy Carruthers
- Andras Jones as Daniel Dupre
- Susan Tyrrell as Mayor Eleanor Grimbaum
- Peter Jason as Chief Higgins
- Sarah Douglas as The Surgeon
- Tom Savini as Roland
- Jack Nance as Father McKenzie
- Randy Vasquez as Henry "Little Henry" Burne
- Chris Cowell as The Executioner
- Joseph Pilato as "Boxer"
- Reggie Bannister as Warden Thomas
- Dan Hicks as Krutchfield
- Bob Hurst as Duffy
- Niles Allen Stewart as "Hammerhead"
- David Anthony Marshall as "One Eye"
- Andre Rosey Brown as Frank "Big Frank"
- James Mongold as Arlis
- Paul Munoz as "Skin"
- Russ MacGuire as "Ram"
- J. Wolf as "Wolf"
- Brandon Burke as Jermot
- Randy Stafford as "Lipps"
- Derek Mears as Chuck "Chuck X"
- Porter Jamison as "Swamp Rat"
- Walter T. Hubbard as "The Hubb"
- Richard French as J.C.
- Ryan Powley as "Porkchop"
- Armand Medina as Mortay
- Michael Maranda as Otto
- Joelle Sailers as Biker Slut
- Bruce Campbell as Raffle Winner (uncredited)

== Production ==
Special effects artist Robert Kurtzman made his directorial debut with The Demolitionist and co-wrote the original screenplay with his wife Anne. The Kurtzman's had wanted to work on a low-budget film together with the plan being for Anne to produce the film while Robert would direct it. After producer Donald P. Borchers learned of their planned film, he came aboard and helped set up the film at Border Planet Productions and A-Pix Entertainment which gave the film a bigger albeit still low budget. In order to stretch their low budget, the producers made a deal with Coca-Cola who in exchange for prominent product placement provided funds for the production as well as unlimited drinks for the cast and crew during production.

== Release ==
The film premiered in Los Angeles on March 10, 1995. It later received a limited theatrical release in May 1996 before debuting on video in July 1996.

== Reception ==
The film has a 17% approval rating based on 6 reviews on Rotten Tomatoes. Ray Mark Rinaldi of St. Louis Post-Dispatch highlighted the film's camp aesthetics, and described the performances as a "cartoon brought to life." Glenn Kenny of EW praised the film for its "low budget charm". Lorry Kikta of Film Threat praised the action sequences, costume design, and dialogue. She also highlighted the performances of Susan Tyrell and Richard Grieco. In contrast, TV Guide panned the movie, commenting that it was obviously inspired by RoboCop, but lacked the "inspiration's satiric viewpoint, or enough of a budget to create any memorable action scenes."
