= The Night Flier (film) =

1997 American horror film

- DVD cover
- Directed by: Mark Pavia
- Written by: Mark Pavia; Jack O'Donnell
- Story by: Stephen King
- Based on: The Night Flier by Stephen King
- Produced by: Mitchell Galin; Richard P. Rubinstein
- Starring: Miguel Ferrer; Julie Entwisle; Dan Monahan; Michael H. Moss
- Cinematography: David Connell
- Edited by: Elizabeth Schwartz
- Music by: Brian Keane
- Production company: Laurel Productions
- Distributed by: New Line Cinema
- Release dates: May 2, 1997 (Italy); November 7, 1997 (U.S. HBO); February 6, 1998 (U.S. theatrical)
- Running time: 93 minutes
- Countries: United States; Italy
- Language: English
- Box office: $125,397 (United States only)

The Night Flier (also known as Stephen King's The Night Flier) is a 1997 American horror film based on the 1988 short story of the same name by Stephen King. Directed and co-written by Mark Pavia, the film stars Miguel Ferrer as Richard Dees, a tabloid reporter who, while investigating a series of murders committed in airfields, begins to suspect that the killer may be a vampire.

The Night Flier premiered on television in the United States on HBO on November 7, 1997, receiving a limited theatrical release in the United States by New Line Cinema the following year.

== Plot ==
Richard Dees is a cynical tabloid reporter whose motto is "Never believe what you publish and never publish what you believe." Merton Morrison, his editor-in-chief at the tabloid Inside View, assigns him to investigate a series of murders at rural airfields. The killer is a mysterious pilot who appears to believe that he is a vampire and is registered under the name of Dwight Renfield. Dees initially refuses the story, and Morrison assigns it to novice reporter Katherine Blair. Dees later changes his mind and agrees to investigate after two more murders are committed at another airfield, the victims drained of their blood. Blair is outraged when Morrison gives the story to Dees, who begins using his own light aircraft to retrace the killer's path.

Dees gathers witness accounts and bribes officials as he conducts his investigation. He is amoral, caring only about sensationalizing the story: he has no scruples about desecrating a grave for a photo opportunity or taking pictures of dead victims for publication. As he investigates, he receives messages from Renfield warning him off the story.

Dees grows obsessed with the story, as it appears that Renfield has hypnotic abilities often associated with vampires. Dees antagonizes his editor Morrison by refusing to provide an article until he finishes investigating. An angry Morrison sends Blair to conduct her own parallel investigation. Dees and Blair run into each other at a motel, and Dees convinces Blair to join forces with the promise that he will share the byline with her.

The duo determine that Renfield has just landed at Wilmington airfield. Dees betrays Blair, locking her in a closet and telling her he doesn't share bylines. He flies to Wilmington and asks if there is a black skymaster airplane on the ramp, but then the radio communicator is filled with sounds of screaming. Then Dwight tells Dees To turn back while he still can but Dees refuses. He finds Renfield's black Cessna Skymaster, the interior covered in blood and an old photo album showing a pilot and his wife.

Dees hears screaming again and heads back to the terminal, where he finds dozens of mutilated bodies. He photographs the bodies until, finally unnerved, he goes to the bathroom to vomit. There Renfield confronts him. Renfield, clearly a monstrous being but with his face still obscured, tells the reporter that he likes Dees's work and would find the world more dull without him in it. Renfield destroys Dees's photographic film and gives one final warning to leave him alone. As Renfield leaves, Dees chases after him and demands to see Renfield's face. Renfield complies, remarking that Dees has been chasing death his whole life; Renfield's face is hideous and malformed, and the vampire forces Dees to drink his blood. Dees hallucinates that the victims are rising as revenants (or folkloric vampires), so he grabs a fire axe and begins recklessly hacking them. Police officers arrive on the scene, accompanied by Blair, and find Dees alone chopping up bodies. They shoot him dead. Blair goes to the window and sees Renfield get in his plane and take off, but, adopting Dees's motto, she publishes an article portraying Dees as the killer.

== Cast ==
- Miguel Ferrer as Richard Dees
- Julie Entwisle as Katherine Blair
- Dan Monahan as Merton Morrison
- Michael H. Moss as Dwight Renfield
- John Bennes as Ezra Hannon
- Beverly Skinner as Selida McCamon
- Rob Wilds as Buck Kendall
- Richard K. Olsen as Claire Bowie
- Elizabeth McCormick as Ellen Sarch

== Production ==
=== Writing and casting ===
The Night Flier is based on the 1988 short story of the same title by Stephen King. Jack O'Donnell, who co-wrote the film alongside director Mark Pavia, said that, "Mark and I wanted to keep this film as close to the story as possible. Obviously, a 40-page short story is going to need to be filled out to turn it into a feature film." The character of Katherine Blair was added to the screenplay when O'Donnell, Pavia, and King decided to include "a younger rookie for Dees to play off of."

Miguel Ferrer, who plays Richard Dees, first met King during the production of the 1994 miniseries The Stand. Ferrer became aware of the Night Flier adaptation about a year prior to the film's production, when The Stand director Mick Garris informed him that he was being considered for a role in it. Ferrer was not familiar with the short story at the time, and stated that, "I went out and got it and read it, and I thought, 'Well, this is a great story, but I don't see a movie here,' you know what I mean? I didn't get it; I didn't see what they were going to do with it. So I spoke to Stephen and Mark, and I got the script and I thought, 'This is a really, really ingenious adaptation.'" It featured the film debut of actress Julie Entwisle as Katherine Blair. In an interview shortly after the film's release, she stated, "the character I play, Katherine Blair, is a terrific, amazingly written female character. She's very strong. You don't see a lot of strong female characters, especially in genre pictures. They scream and run away, you know, or get saved. And nobody does any saving of Katherine Blair. She doesn't need it." Regarding working with Ferrer, Entwisle said that "I was so pleased and felt so blessed that my first moments on a screen were with him."

The name of the vampire in the film, Dwight Renfield, is derived from American actor Dwight Frye and his role as Renfield in the 1931 English-language film Dracula.

=== Filming ===
The Night Flier was shot on location in Wilmington, North Carolina. The production lost a day when Hurricane Bertha made landfall in the state. Pavia stated that, "I was pretty worried that we might lose some sets that we had just built, but we were lucky. We inspected them the day after the hurricane hit and they were fine. Some of the detail had gotten lost, some of the landscaping had changed, but overall it didn't really affect us."

=== Special effects ===
The special effects and prosthetic makeup for the film was provided by KNB EFX Group. Moss recalled that, when he first auditioned for the role of Renfield, "I didn't know I would be in full makeup with the jaws and stuff. All I had were the [written] scenes, which I had been given for the audition. So I immediately felt how sad this man is, to have to be immortal and fly around and land in places with some kind of anonymity and all off people to feed, and I thought that aspect of him really was the most attractive [thing about the role]. But later, when I found out about all the rest of the stuff, I went, 'Oh, cool!'"

== Release ==
The film, which was independently financed by European investors, attracted strong interest from Paramount Pictures. In 1996, Paramount had released the King adaptation film Thinner, in addition to also handling his 1985 film adaptation Silver Bullet, and his 1989-90 film adaptations Graveyard Shift and Pet Sematary. Due to a crowded release schedule, the studio could only bring the film to theaters in time for Halloween 1998. Director Mark Pavia and producer Richard P. Rubinstein opted not to take Paramount's offer, as keeping the film on the shelf until October 1998 would break obligations they had with their European investors. The Night Flier would instead premiere in the United States on HBO on November 7, 1997 (it had previously received a worldwide premiere in Italy during May of that year). The film was later picked up by New Line Cinema, which was owned by Time Warner, the same parent company of HBO. New Line gave it a U.S. theatrical release on February 6, 1998, where it had an underwhelming run. Overall, it grossed $210,426 from 91 theaters.

The Night Flier was first released on DVD by HBO Home Video on May 27, 1998. Since then the film has been released multiple times by HBO and Warner Home Video, and was once distributed by Mosaic Movies in 2000. Fox acquired home video rights for the film in Australia, and in 1998, it received an Australian VHS release by 20th Century Fox Home Entertainment South Pacific. In Australia, it later received a 2005 DVD release from local distributor Force Entertainment.

The film is not available on the Warner-owned streaming site HBO Max, or on any other streaming platforms. It has also never been released on Blu-ray or 4K Ultra HD.

== Reception ==
On Rotten Tomatoes, the film holds an approval rating of 33% based on six reviews, with a weighted average rating of 4.1/10. On Metacritic, which assigns a rating to reviews, the film has a weighted average score of 36 out of 100 based on seven critics, indicating "generally unfavorable reviews".

Stephen Holden of The New York Times gave the film a negative review, criticizing the film's poor adaptation and lack of thrills, citing Ferrer's performance as the film's sole strength. Lisa Schwarzbaum from Entertainment Weekly wrote, "Once the easy joke about the fellowship of bloodsuckers has sunk in and the versatility of latex in the creation of gore has been demonstrated, there's not much else going on [...] What personality there is comes from Ferrer, who, with a belligerent glower, throws himself into the role of the soul-dead reporter with a full-blooded intensity that's almost more than this undead caper can handle."

Leonard Maltin gave the film a score of 2.5/4 stars, complimenting the film's "Genuinely creepy mood" and Ferrer's performance, but criticized the final third of the film. Lael Loewenstein from Variety gave the film a positive review, writing, "The Night Flier is a creepy vampire tale that also offers some clever commentary on bloodthirsty tabloid journalists." The film was featured in John Kenneth Muir's 2011 book Horror Films of the 1990s, with Muir calling the film a "good commentary on tabloid journalism in the 1990s, and a better-than-average adaptation of Stephen King source material."

== Awards ==
The film had 3 award nominations with 1 win.

- 25th Saturn Awards Best Home Video Release: The Night Flier – (Nominated)
- 1999 Fangoria Chainsaw Awards Best Limited Release: The Night Flier – (Won)
- 1999 Fangoria Chainsaw Awards Best Actor: Miguel Ferrer − The Night Flier as Richard Dees – (Nominated)

== Cancelled sequel ==
A sequel script titled Fear of Flying was written by Pavia and King in the mid-2000s, focusing more on the Katherine Blair character as well as the origins of the Night Flier killer. However, the duo failed to gain the required 10 million dollars in financing from Hollywood studios, due to the original 1997 film being viewed as merely a minor cult hit.
