= Richard P. Rubinstein =

American film and television producer

- Born: Brooklyn, New York, U.S.
- Education: American University; Columbia University
- Occupation: Producer
- Years active: 1970–present
- Spouse: Katherine Rubinstein
- Relatives: Donald Rubinstein (brother)

Richard P. Rubinstein is an American film and television producer, who has worked mainly in the science fiction and horror genres.

In the 1970s and 1980s he collaborated frequently with horror director George A. Romero, including on the seminal zombie films Dawn of the Dead (1978) and Day of the Dead (1985). He also produced Romero's anthology horror television series Tales from the Darkside (1984–88).

In the 1980s and 1990s, Rubinstein produced a substantial number of projects based on the writings of horror novelist Stephen King. He has also produced film and television adaptations of Frank Herbert's Dune novels.

== Early life ==
Rubinstein was born in Brooklyn, New York. His younger brother, born in 1952, is Donald Rubinstein, a composer who wrote the music for some of the films and series Rubinstein produced.

Rubinstein received an undergraduate degree from American University, and an MBA from Columbia University.

== Career ==
Rubinstein began his production career as a production assistant for television commercials. He got his first associate producer credit in the early 1970s for the one-hour TV special A Night with Nicol Williamson, produced by Dore Schary. In 1973 Rubinstein produced The Winners, a series of one-hour profiles about various American sports heroes, and in 1974 he independently produced a similar one-hour television special profiling O. J. Simpson.

=== Laurel Entertainment ===
In the mid-1970s, Rubinstein and horror director George A. Romero co-founded the production company Laurel Entertainment. In 1979, Rubinstein took the company public, to raise more money.

In 1984, Romero left Laurel Entertainment to pursue his own projects, although the two would continue to collaborate. In 1986, Laurel teamed up with New World Pictures in order to co-produce the film Creepshow 2. In 1988, Rubinstein and Aaron Spelling merged Laurel Entertainment and Spelling's own production company, Aaron Spelling Productions as subsidiaries of a new public company, Spelling Entertainment Inc. The merger was completed on March 1, 1989. Rubinstein remained head of the Laurel Entertainment division.

On October 5, 1993, Blockbuster Entertainment acquired a controlling stake in Spelling Entertainment Group., and in 1994 it in turn was bought by Viacom. In 1995, Rubinstein, who was still head of the Laurel division, left to found his own, smaller production company, New Amsterdam Entertainment in New York City. Laurel Entertainment was folded into Spelling Television the same year.

=== Association with George Romero ===
Through Laurel Entertainment, Rubinstein co-produced or executive produced a number of Romero's films, most notably Dawn of the Dead but also Martin (1978), Knightriders (1981), Creepshow (1982) and Day of the Dead (1985).

Rubinstein also executive produced Romero's 1983–1988 anthology horror series Tales from the Darkside, which was based on the success of Creepshow. After Tales from the Darkside ended, Rubinstein executive produced the similar anthology show Monsters, which ran from 1988 to 1991, this one without involvement from Romero.

Rubinstein also co-produced the 2004 remake of Romero's Dawn of the Dead, again without involvement from Romero (Romero was critical of the remake, saying it was more like a "video game").

=== Association with Stephen King ===
Rubinstein's first known professional collaboration with Stephen King was the 1982 anthology film Creepshow, which Rubinstein co-produced and which had a screenplay written by King, based on a combination of some of King's published short stories as well as new plots. In 1987, via Laurel Entertainment, Rubinstein executive-produced its sequel, Creepshow 2, this time based on King's stories but written by Romero. In the 1980s, two anthology horror series that Rubinstein executive-produced, Tales from the Darkside and Monsters, included episodes based on short stories by King. The 1990 anthology horror film Tales from the Darkside: The Movie also included a chapter based on a short story by King. Rubinstein co-produced the 1991 miniseries Golden Years, which was written by King, based on an original concept.

Rubinstein also produced a string of film and television adaptations of other written works by Stephen King, including the 1989 film Pet Sematary, the 1994 miniseries The Stand, the 1995 miniseries The Langoliers, the 1996 film Thinner and the 1997 film The Night Flier. These were often co-produced with Mitchell Galin.

=== Dune ===
Rubinstein held the film and television rights to the Dune series of books by Frank Herbert since 1996. With Mitchell Galin, Rubinstein produced the 2000 miniseries Frank Herbert's Dune and its 2003 follow-up, Frank Herbert's Children of Dune. In 2008, Rubinstein attempted to produce a film adaptation of Dune with Paramount Pictures, but Paramount dropped the effort in 2011. Legendary Pictures and Warner Bros. Pictures later acquired the rights from Rubinstein for a new two-film adaption of Dune to be directed by Denis Villeneuve with the first part to be released in December 2020; Rubinstein served as executive producer for the films.

== Filmography ==
Key
†	Denotes films that have not yet been released

=== Film ===
Year	Title	Producer	Executive Producer	Director	Notes
1975	The Amusement Park	Yes	No	George A. Romero	Not widely released until 2019
1977	Martin	Yes	No	George A. Romero	
1978	Dawn of the Dead	Yes	No	George A. Romero	
1981	Knightriders	Yes	No	George A. Romero	
1982	Creepshow	Yes	No	George A. Romero	
1985	Day of the Dead	Yes	No	George A. Romero	
1987	Creepshow 2	No	Yes	Michael Gornick	
1989	Pet Sematary	Yes	No	Mary Lambert	
1990	Tales from the Darkside: The Movie	Yes	No	John Harrison	
1996	Thinner	Yes	No	Tom Holland	
1997	The Night Flier	Yes	No	Mark Pavia	
2004	Dawn of the Dead	Yes	No	Zack Snyder	Remake of 1978 film
2008	Giving It Up	Yes	No	Frank Ray	Documentary
2021	Dune	No	Yes	Denis Villeneuve	
2024	Dune: Part Two	No	Yes	Denis Villeneuve	
2026	Dune: Part Three †	No	Yes	Denis Villeneuve	Post-production

=== Television ===
Year	Title	Producer	Executive Producer	Notes
1973–74	The Winners	Yes	Yes	Documentary series
1974	O. J. Simpson: Juice on the Loose	Yes	No	Documentary
1976	Magic at the Roxy	No	Yes	Special
1983–88	Tales from the Darkside	No	Yes	90 episodes
1987	Night Rose: Akhbar's Daughter	No	Yes	TV movie
1988–91	Monsters	No	Yes	72 episodes Also creator
1991	Golden Years	Yes	No	Miniseries
1991	The Secrets of Dick Smith	No	Yes	Documentary
1993	Precious Victims	No	Yes	TV movie
1994	The Vernon Johns Story	No	Yes	TV movie
1994	The Stand	No	Yes	Miniseries
1995	The Langoliers	No	Yes	Miniseries
1996	Kiss and Tell	No	Yes	TV movie
1996	A Season in Purgatory	No	Yes	Miniseries
2000	Frank Herbert's Dune	No	Yes	Miniseries
2003	Frank Herbert's Children of Dune	No	Yes	Miniseries
2020–21	The Stand	No	Yes	Miniseries
2024–present	Dune: Prophecy	No	Yes	6 episodes

== Awards and accolades ==
- Rubinstein received a Monte Carlo TV Festival award and a Christopher Award for The Vernon Johns Story, a 1994 TV movie starring James Earl Jones.
