= Precious Victims =

- Based on: Precious Victims by Charles Bosworth Jr. and Don W. Weber
- Screenplay by: Deborah Dalton
- Directed by: Peter Levin
- Starring: Park Overall; Robby Benson; Frederic Forrest
- Theme music composer: Mark Snow
- Country of origin: United States
- Original language: English

Production
- Executive producers: Mitchell Galin; Richard P. Rubinstein
- Producer: Timothy Marx
- Production location: Los Angeles
- Cinematography: Paul Maibaum
- Editor: Skip Schoolnik
- Running time: 120 minutes
- Production companies: Big Apple Films; Laurel Productions; Spelling Entertainment

Original release
- Network: CBS
- Release: September 28, 1993

Precious Victims is a 1993 American television film directed by Peter Levin and starring Park Overall, Robby Benson and Frederic Forrest. It is based on the book of the same name by Charles Bosworth Jr. and Don W. Weber.

== Cast ==
- Park Overall as Paula Sims
- Robby Benson as Robert Sims
- Frederic Forrest as Sheriff Frank Yocom
- Brion James as Agent Jimmy Bivens
- Cliff DeYoung as Don Groshong
- Robyn Lively as Wendy McBride
- Nancy Cartwright as Ruth Potter
- Eileen Brennan as Minnie Gray
- Richard Thomas as Don Weber

== Production ==
Filming occurred in Los Angeles.

== Reception ==
Maj Canton of Radio Times awarded the film three stars out of five.
