= Michael McDowell (author) =

American novelist and screenwriter

- Born: Michael McEachern McDowell; June 1, 1950; Enterprise, Alabama, United States
- Died: December 27, 1999 (aged 49); Boston, Massachusetts, United States
- Occupations: Novelist; screenwriter
- Writing career
- Pen name: Axel Young; Nathan Aldyne; Preston Macadam; Mike McCray
- Period: 1979–1999
- Genre: Horror

Michael McEachern McDowell (June 1, 1950 – December 27, 1999) was an American novelist and screenwriter. He was described by Stephen King as "the finest writer of paperback originals in America today." His best-known work is the screenplay for the Tim Burton film Beetlejuice.

== Early life and education ==
McDowell was born in 1950 in Enterprise, Alabama, and graduated from T.R. Miller High School in Brewton, Alabama. He received a Bachelor of Arts and a Master of Arts from Harvard University, and a Ph.D. in English from Brandeis University in 1978 with a dissertation entitled "American Attitudes Toward Death, 1825–1865".

== Career ==
While arguably best known for his works of Southern Gothic horror, McDowell wrote several series with wide differences in tone and subject matter. His historical novels were praised for their well-researched and accurate details, and range from Gilded Age New York City to Great Depression Alabama.

McDowell collaborated with his close friend Dennis Schuetz in writing four mysteries starring characters Daniel Valentine and Clarisse Lovelace: Vermillion (1980), Cobalt (1982), Slate (1984), and Canary (1986). The four novels were published under the pseudonym Nathan Aldyne.

McDowell and Schuetz also released two psychological thrillers, Blood Rubies (1982) and Wicked Stepmother (1983), under the pseudonym Axel Young. Both books were over-the-top parodies of Sidney Sheldon-type suspense novels.

In the mid-1980s, McDowell wrote the "Jack and Susan" mysteries for Ballantine Books, featuring characters reminiscent of the Thin Man films. The series included Jack and Susan in 1953 (1985), Jack and Susan in 1913 (1986), and Jack and Susan in 1933 (1987). The books chronicled the adventures of an eternally youthful couple and their dog. McDowell was contracted to do one for each decade of the century, but he exited the contract after three.

His screenwriting credits included Beetlejuice (1988), The Nightmare Before Christmas (1993), and Thinner (1996). McDowell also wrote the novelization of Clue in 1985. The film featured three different endings, but the novelization was based on the shooting script and includes an additional fourth ending that was cut from the film. He also contributed screenplays to a number of television horror anthologies, including Tales from the Darkside.

McDowell was one of seventeen contemporary British and American horror writers interviewed by Douglas E. Winter in his 1985 interview book Faces of Fear. Of his own writing, McDowell said: "I am a commercial writer and I'm proud of that. [...] I am writing things to be put in the bookstore next month. [...] I think it is a mistake to try to write for the ages." Stephen King described McDowell as "the finest writer of paperback originals in America today."

== Personal life and death ==
McDowell lived in Medford, Massachusetts, and maintained a residence in Hollywood, Los Angeles, with his sister Ann and the filmmaker Peter Lake. He also had one brother, James.

McDowell's partner was theater historian and director Laurence Senelick, whom he met in 1969 when McDowell was a cast member of a play Senelick directed, Bartholomew Fair. McDowell and Senelick remained together for thirty years until McDowell's death.

McDowell was diagnosed with AIDS in 1994. After his diagnosis, McDowell taught screenwriting at Boston University and Tufts University while continuing to write commissioned screenplays. One of his final projects, upon which he was working at the time of his death, was a sequel to Beetlejuice. His final, unfinished novel Candles Burning was completed by novelist Tabitha King and published in 2006. McDowell died on December 27, 1999, in Boston, Massachusetts, from an AIDS-related illness at the age of 49.

McDowell specialized in collecting death memorabilia. His collection reportedly filled over seventy-six boxes, including items such as death pins, photographs, and plaques from infant caskets. After his death, the collection was acquired by Northwestern University, where it went on display in 2013.

== Bibliography ==
- The Amulet (1979), reissued in 2013 by Valancourt Books, with a new introduction by Poppy Z. Brite.
- Cold Moon Over Babylon (1980), reissued in 2015 by Valancourt Books, with a new introduction by Douglas E. Winter.
- Gilded Needles (1980), reissued in 2015 by Valancourt Books, with a new introduction by Christopher Fowler.
- The Elementals (1981), reissued in 2014 by Valancourt Books, with a new introduction by Michael Rowe.
- Katie (1982), reissued in 2015 by Valancourt Books.
- The Blackwater series (1983): The Flood, The Levee, The House, The War, The Fortune, Rain. Books 1-3 and 4-6 of the Blackwater series were collected as two omnibus editions released in 1983 immediately after the original serialized publication. In 2014, the series was reissued by Tough Times Publishing as ebooks of both the original individual volumes and as a single omnibus, Blackwater: The Complete Caskey Family Saga. In 2015, another hardcover publication of the full series, with illustrations by Patrick Loehr and an introduction by Poppy Z. Brite, was released as a limited edition by Centipede Press. An omnibus edition was reissued in 2017 by Valancourt Books, with a new introduction by Nathan Ballingrud.
- Toplin (1985), reissued in 2017 by Valancourt Books.
- Clue (1985), movie novelization.
- The Jack and Susan novels, also known as the Wild Card series: Jack and Susan in 1953 (1985), Jack and Susan in 1913 (1986), Jack and Susan in 1933 (1987). All novels in this series were reprinted in 2013 by Felony & Mayhem Press.
- Candles Burning (2006), completed by Tabitha King after McDowell's death.

Short stories

- "Miss Mack" in Halloween Horrors (September 1986, ed. Alan Ryan, Doubleday), reprinted in The Valancourt Book of Horror Stories, Vol. 1 (October 2016, Valancourt Books)
- "Halley's Passing" in Twilight Zone Magazine (June 1987), reprinted in The Year's Best Science Fiction: Fifth Annual Collection (May 1988, St. Martin's Press) and in The Year's Best Fantasy: First Annual Collection (1988, St. Martin's Press)

As Axel Young (with Dennis Schuetz)

- Blood Rubies (1982), reissued in 2017 by Valancourt Books.
- Wicked Stepmother (1983), reissued in 2017 by Valancourt Books.

As Nathan Aldyne (with Dennis Schuetz)

- The Valentine and Lovelace series, all reprinted in 2014 by Felony & Mayhem Press: Vermillion (1980), Cobalt (1982), Slate (1984), Canary (1986).

As Preston Macadam

- Michael Sheriff, The Shield: African Assignment (1985)
- Michael Sheriff, The Shield: Arabian Assault (1985)
- Michael Sheriff, The Shield: Island Intrigue (1985)

As Mike McCray

- Several titles in the Black Beret series (1984–1987)

== Screenwriting credits ==
- Alfred Hitchcock Presents ("The Jar")
- Amazing Stories ("Miscalculation")
- Beetlejuice (1988) (shared story and screenplay)
- Tales from the Darkside (1984–1987) (eleven episodes)
- Tales from the Crypt (1989) ("Lover Come Hack to Me")
- Monsters (1989–1990) ("La Strega" and "Far Below")
- Tales from the Darkside: The Movie (1990) (segments of "Lot 249" and "Lover's Vow")
- The Nightmare Before Christmas (1993) (adaptation)
- Thinner (1996) (screenplay with Tom Holland, based on the 1984 novel by Stephen King)

== Adaptations ==
- Beetlejuice (TV series based on the 1988 film)
- Blood Rubies (stage production based on 1982 novel)
- Cold Moon (based on the 1980 novel Cold Moon Over Babylon)
