= The Stranger Within =

The Stranger Within may refer to:

- The Stranger Within (1974 film), an American made-for-television science fiction horror film
- The Stranger Within (1990 film), an American made-for-television thriller film
- The Stranger Within (2013 film), a 2013 thriller starring William Baldwin and Estella Warren
