= Amulet (disambiguation) =

An amulet is an object intended to bring good luck.

Amulet may also refer to:

== Arts and media ==
=== Music ===
- Amulet (band), a Norwegian hardcore band
  - Amulet (Amulet album), their first album
- Amulet (Fursaxa album), released in 2005
- "Amulet" (song), a song by Natacha Atlas from her album Harim
- "Amulet", a song by Paul Simon from his album So Beautiful or So What
- Amulet Records, an American percussion and experimental music label
- The Amulet (album), a 2017 album by American rock band Circa Survive

=== Other media ===
- Amulet (film), a 2020 film directed by Romola Garai
- Amulet (novel), a 1999 novel by Roberto Bolaño
- Amulet Books, an imprint of Abrams Books
- Amulet (comics), a graphic novel series by Kazu Kibuishi
- The Amulet (novel), a 1979 horror novel by Michael McDowell
- The Story of the Amulet, a children's story by E. Nesbit

== Other uses ==
- AMULET microprocessor
- Amulet, Saskatchewan, a hamlet
