= Twisted Tales (web series) =

- Cover for the 2014 DVD release
- Genre: Horror
- Created by: Tom Holland
- Written by: Tom Holland
- Directed by: Tom Holland
- Composers: Alan Hewitt, Joe Renzetti
- Country of origin: United States
- Original language: English
- No. of seasons: 1
- No. of episodes: 9

Production
- Producer: Dennis DeFrehn
- Cinematography: Will Barratt
- Production company: Dead Rabbit Films

Original release
- Network: Fearnet (online); Image Entertainment (DVD, USA); Umbrella Entertainment (Australia)
- Release: October 2013

Twisted Tales (also known as Tom Holland's Twisted Tales) is a 2013 webseries that was written and directed by American director Tom Holland. The series was released in late 2013 through Fearnet's website and was released onto DVD on March 18, 2014, through Image Entertainment.

Holland had initially planned for Twisted Tales to have thirteen episodes, but had to cut four episodes because of budgetary and time constraints. He later released those in script format. He has stated that he is unsure as to whether or not he will continue the series, but that if he did, he would prefer to make each episode at least 30 minutes in length.

== Synopsis ==
Each episode begins with Tom Holland introducing the short and the basic plot of each episode, with the only exception being Vampire Dance, where Holland appears as a janitor and makes several comments as the episode progresses. The shorts are all self-contained and are unrelated to one another in any aspect other than Holland serving as the opening narrator.

== Episodes ==
Episode #	Title	Original release date	U.S. viewers (millions)	Rating/Share 18-49
1	"Fred and His GPS"	TBA	TBD	TBA
Businessman Fred (A. J. Bowen) has murdered his wife Samantha (Bonnie Piesse) in a fit of jealous rage. He uses his voice-activated GPS to plot a course to the airport with the intent to escape any retribution for his crime and in so doing, tearfully admits to the machine what he's done. As he drives Fred begins to notice that everyone he passes looks like Samantha and he begins to try to justify his actions to the GPS by saying that his wife was unfaithful — only for the GPS to begin arguing back and forth with him in his wife's voice, causing Fred to think that he is either insane or that his wife's spirit is inhabiting the GPS. The GPS says several things that makes Fred doubt his assertions about his wife's faithfulness and they continue fighting until Fred pulls over. He gets out of his car to seek help as this has all made him quite scared, Fred is instantly hit by a car and dies- much to the delight of the GPS unit.
2	"To Hell with You"	TBA	TBD	TBA
After a particularly messy and public breakup with her cheating boyfriend Carlos (Eddie Hargitay), Susan (Danielle Harris) accidentally sells her soul to Mr. Smith (William Forsythe) in exchange for her boyfriend's death. She tries to wriggle out of the deal, only for Mr. Smith to initially rebuff her attempts. Susan manages to get a wish out of Mr. Smith and she uses it to demand to speak to the Devil, knowing that it would end with Mr. Smith being tortured for bringing an ordinary mortal in front of the powerful entity. She blackmails Mr. Smith into resetting time to the beginning of her date with Carlos, where Susan spends no time in dumping Carlos herself by admitting that she was unfaithful as well before humiliating Carlos and leaving. Upset, Carlos is approached by Mr. Smith, who offers Carlos the same deal he offered Susan.
3	"Boom"	TBA	TBD	TBA
Dave (Noah Hathaway) is an ex-military bomb expert that is convinced that his wife Jolene (Sarah Butler) is cheating on him with his best friend Buddy (Alex Urbom). Upset, he lures them both into a garage and manages to get Buddy to trip the dead man's switch. Once he has them completely trapped, Dave begins to demand answers. Buddy and Jolene manage to convince Dave that they were only talking to one another in order to plan a surprise party for him, and Dave releases them both from confinement by switching places with his friend. Once free, they confess that Dave's assumptions were true and that they had been having an affair. They leave Dave with his finger on the trigger and leave with the idea that he will die and be able to take their affair public, only for Dave to call them and reveal that the true bomb is in the car, which summarily blows up
4	"Mongo's Magik Mirror"	TBA	TBD	TBA
Dunstin Dynamite (Joel Ward) and his assistant Mary Contrary (Breanne Racano) have approached street magician Mongo the Magnificent (Ray Wise) with the intent to purchase a magic mirror capable of transporting people to a world that shows their true selves. They believe it to be an elaborate illusion, but they're surprised to find that it's all too real. Dunstin tries to persuade and then force Mongo into selling the mirror, who refuses. A trip through the mirror shows Mary to be a good person as evidenced by a beautiful world in various shades of pink, but Dunstin's world turns out to be dark and violent. Mongo reveals that he came across the mirror by accident in an obscure shop and that he's not really aware of where the mirror truly came from. Dunstin tries to trap Mongo and Mary (as she did not want Dunstin to harm Mongo) in the mirror and leave them to their deaths, but ultimately ends up getting pulled into the mirror himself and gets trapped there. The short ends with Mary agreeing to become Mongo's assistant, as the mirror greatly likes her.
5	"Bite"	TBA	TBD	TBA
Susan (Brianne Howey) and her friends are all too eager to try a new type of salvia named "Bite", as it reportedly gives people psychic visions. After smoking the drug the group views a news report stating the drug actually transforms the user into a bloodthirsty werewolf as opposed to giving them psychic visions. They freak out and Susan tries to convince everyone that as Bite is supposed to cause hallucinations, that they are imagining everything. Her plea for calm is short lived as they begin to transform one by one, making it necessary for the turned parties to be killed. It culminates with Susan watching one of her friends turn into a werewolf and attack her, only for her to realize that it was all a vision of the future. She tries to persuade the group to not smoke the drug, but is unsuccessful and is eventually killed when everyone turns.
6	"Shockwave"	TBA	TBD	TBA
Lida (Angela Bettis), her husband Jesse (Josh Holland), and her friends Toughey (James Duval) and Dhianna (Amber Benson) are having a pleasant dinner in a large mansion in Los Angeles when they view a news report that says that deadly nuclear EMP waves that are rolling across cities and wiping out humanity. The house has a saferoom and the house's occupants fight over who can enter it, as it can only hold two. The fight ends up with all but Dhianna, Lida, and the pregnant house maid dying at one another's hands. Dhianna tries to kill the maid so she and Lida can enter the cage, but Lida kills Dhianna and urges the maid to enter. Lida looks over the corpses of her loved ones before sitting out on the patio to watch the world end. The following morning Lida awakens without any issues and a news report states that the initial reports that the EMP waves would kill everyone was false, as the new information shows that the EMP waves only affected technology and not human life, making the previous night's deaths unnecessary.
7	"Cached"	TBA	TBD	TBA
Against the advice of his friend Ricardo (Jose Pablo Cantillo), Barney (Jonathan Chase) steals an iPad off the corpse of a strange paranoid man that they watch kill himself. Barney is frightened when computer programmer Danny Doyle (Adam Rose) begins communicating with him via FaceTime, threatening to kill him. Barney is initially skeptical of Danny's ability to fulfill his threats and tries to throw the iPad away, only for it to reappear in his house. He calls his friend Ricardo, who reveals that Danny has been dead for four years, as he had been a pedophile that enjoyed killing his victims and did not want to go to jail or death row. Danny proceeds to torment Barney by sending him images via his iPhone and television, culminating with Barney trying to destroy the iPad and kill Danny by shooting him. Frightened, Barney runs to a remote area in an attempt to hide from Danny. His friend Ricardo appears (having been in contact with Barney via his phone) and an invisible Danny attacks Ricardo and kills Barney. The iPad reappears next to Barney and Danny unsuccessfully tries to goad Ricardo into picking up the iPad, as he can only attack people once they have made physical contact with the device. Ricardo instead runs away in fear, leaving the iPad lying on the ground while Danny yells for someone to pick it up and start the cycle over again.
8	"Pizza Guy"	TBA	TBD	TBA
Desperate to talk to her dead sister, Erin (Erin Aine Smith) performs a Satanic ritual to summon the devil. When a pizza delivery guy (Marc Senter) appears, Erin believes that her ritual is successful. Her friends try to persuade her otherwise, but Erin is unflagging in her belief. After some discussion and trouble, the delivery guy reveals that he is a goat demon.
9	"Vampire's Dance"	TBA	TBD	TBA
A young woman comes into a club looking for her missing roommate and is assisted by a handsome young man. The club is revealed to be a feeding grounds for vampires, who use it as a way to lure in unsuspecting humans. The woman is given the choice to either become a meal or get turned into a vampire herself. She chooses to become a vampire and becomes the man's lover. Unlike the previous shorts, Holland reappears several times during the short to make various statements about the woman's predicament.

== Reception ==
Critical reception for Twisted Tales has been mixed. Fangoria and Twitch Film both gave the DVD anthology mostly positive reviews and Twitch Film noted that "As with nearly every anthology series out there, there are high notes and low notes." We Got This Covered and Dread Central both expressed disappointment over the collection in comparison to Holland's previous work and Dread Central opined that the DVD collection would have been stronger if Holland had condensed the work and included only the stronger pieces, as the weaker shorts dragged the others down.
