= The Owl (1991 film) =

American TV Movie

- Title card
- Genre: Action
- Based on: The Owl by Bob Forward
- Written by: Tom Holland
- Directed by: Tom Holland (as Alan Smithee)
- Starring: Adrian Paul
- Music by: Sylvester Levay
- Country of origin: United States
- Original language: English

Production
- Executive producers: Tom Holland; Kim LeMasters
- Producers: Joel Simon; Bill Todman Jr. Bob Forward
- Cinematography: Steve Yaconelli
- Editor: Casey Brown
- Running time: 48 minutes (TV); 84 minutes (home video)
- Production company: Lorimar Film Entertainment

Original release
- Network: CBS
- Release: August 3, 1991

The Owl is a 1991 American action television film inspired by the 1984 novel of the same name by Bob Forward. The film, intended as a pilot for a series on CBS, was written and directed by Tom Holland, who chose to be credited as "Alan Smithee" on the later extended home video release. The film starred Adrian Paul, Patricia Charbonneau, Brian Thompson, and Erika Flores.

== Plot ==
Alex L'Hiboux, a ruthless mercenary-cum-vigilante, is known as "the Owl" because he never sleeps. His insomnia comes from a combination of a medical disorder and recurring nightmares of the murder of his wife and daughter. Alex is approached by Lisa, a young girl whose father is missing. She awakens painful memories of his own child, but after some persuasion from a policewoman friend, he agrees to help her.

== Cast ==
- Adrian Paul as "The Owl"
- Patricia Charbonneau as Danny Santerre
- Brian Thompson as The Barkeeper
- Erika Flores as Lisa
- Jacques Apollo Bolton as "Cool Ice"
- David Anthony Marshall as Bobby "Bobby B"
- Billy "Sly" Williams as "Gullett"
- David Selburg as Dr. Clements
- Mark Lowenthal as Mr. Miller
- Alan Scarfe as Hutchins
- Thomas Rosales Jr. as Morito
- Alejandro Quezada as Gossett
- Gregory Scott Cummins as "Trash"
- Rick Zumwalt as Packer
- Bridget Klappert as Six-year-old
- Jill Pierce as Dark Haired Lady
- Sondra Spriggs as Black Chick
- Chris Hendrie as Wolpert
- Josh Holland as Mark Wolpert
- Tom Holland as Mugger (uncredited)

== Broadcast and home media ==
The film was broadcast as a television pilot on CBS from 10:45 p.m. to 11:45 p.m. (Eastern Time Zone) on Saturday, August 3, 1991, but was not picked up as a series. The TV broadcast ran 48 minutes, while the later home video release runs 84 minutes. Reviewer Eoin of theactionelite.com explained this difference, writing, "The length was doubled by padding it with deleted scenes (including Holland’s cameo as a rapist), and tedious montages were created utilizing every bit of alternate footage imaginable. Holland was so disgusted by the extended version that he had his directorial credit switched to Alan Smithee – though many video boxes still touted him as the director."

== Reception ==
In a critical review of the film, David Bushman of Variety wrote, "unfortunately, it can't resist the temptation to be cute and sentimental, and thus it often loses momentum."
