= The Stand (1994 miniseries) =

1994 American post-apocalyptic horror miniseries

- Television miniseries poster
- Genre: Post-apocalyptic; Fantasy drama; Horror; Disaster
- Based on: The Stand by Stephen King
- Screenplay by: Stephen King
- Directed by: Mick Garris
- Starring: Gary Sinise; Molly Ringwald; Jamey Sheridan; Rob Lowe; Laura San Giacomo; Miguel Ferrer; Ruby Dee; Bill Fagerbakke; Corin Nemec; Adam Storke; Ray Walston; Matt Frewer; Ossie Davis; Shawnee Smith
- Theme music composer: W.G. Snuffy Walden
- Country of origin: United States
- Original language: English
- No. of episodes: 4

Production
- Executive producers: Stephen King; Richard P. Rubinstein
- Producer: Mitchell Galin
- Production locations: Utah; Nevada; Pennsylvania; New York
- Cinematography: Edward J. Pei
- Editor: Patrick McMahon
- Running time: 366 minutes
- Production companies: Laurel Entertainment; DawnField Entertainment; Greengrass Productions
- Budget: $26 million

Original release
- Network: ABC
- Release: May 8 – May 12, 1994

The Stand (also known as Stephen King's The Stand) is a 1994 American post-apocalyptic horror television miniseries based on the 1978 novel The Stand by Stephen King. Written by King and directed by Mick Garris, the four-part miniseries depicts the aftermath of a deadly engineered strain of influenza that kills most of the world's population. The remaining survivors gradually align themselves with either the benevolent Mother Abagail or the demonic Randall Flagg, leading to a final struggle between good and evil. The ensemble cast includes Gary Sinise, Molly Ringwald, Jamey Sheridan, Laura San Giacomo, Ossie Davis, Ruby Dee, Matt Frewer, Miguel Ferrer, Adam Storke, and Rob Lowe.

The project spent several years in development before reaching television. During the 1980s the novel was initially planned as a theatrical film adaptation to be directed by George A. Romero, but the scale of the story and its projected budget prevented the project from moving forward. In the early 1990s the adaptation was revived as a television miniseries for the American Broadcasting Company (ABC), allowing the narrative to be presented across multiple episodes. Filming took place primarily in Utah and Nevada, with additional production in Pennsylvania and New York, and involved extensive prosthetic makeup and visual effects work to depict the devastation caused by the pandemic.

The miniseries originally aired on ABC over four nights from May 8 to May 12, 1994. It attracted strong ratings and was watched by millions of viewers during its broadcast run. The Stand received generally positive reviews from critics and was nominated for six Primetime Emmy Awards, winning for Outstanding Makeup for a Miniseries, Movie or a Special and Outstanding Sound Mixing for a Limited Series or a Special.

== Plot ==
On June 13, a weaponised strain of influenza known as Project Blue is accidentally released from a secret U.S. Army laboratory in California. A soldier, Charlie Campion, escapes the facility with his wife and child, unknowingly spreading the virus as they travel across the country. Days later he crashes his car in Arnette, Texas, where locals including Stu Redman attempt to help him. Campion dies after warning of a mysterious pursuer he calls the "Dark Man". The military soon quarantines the town under orders from General Starkey, but the virus—nicknamed "Captain Trips"—rapidly spreads across the world, killing 99.4% of the global population within weeks.

Among the scattered survivors are aspiring musician Larry Underwood; deaf-mute drifter Nick Andros; pregnant college student Frannie Goldsmith and her neighbour Harold Lauder; imprisoned criminal Lloyd Henreid; and a disturbed arsonist known as the Trashcan Man. Many survivors begin experiencing dreams in which they are summoned either by the benevolent Mother Abagail, an elderly woman living in Nebraska, or by the sinister "Dark Man", revealed to be the supernatural Randall Flagg. The dreams urge them to travel either to Abagail or to Flagg, forcing them to choose sides.

Lloyd is freed from prison by Flagg and becomes his lieutenant. Meanwhile, Larry escapes the chaos of New York City and travels with a woman named Nadine Cross, who believes she is destined to join Flagg. She eventually leaves Larry, who later joins other survivors heading west. Stu escapes a government facility where scientists were studying the virus and forms a group with Frannie, Harold, and former professor Glen Bateman. In the Midwest, Nick befriends Tom Cullen, a man with an intellectual disability, and together they travel west with farmer Ralph Brentner. These survivors eventually reach Mother Abagail's farm in Hemingford, Nebraska. She warns that a final confrontation between good and evil is approaching and instructs them to travel to Boulder, Colorado, where they establish a community known as the Boulder Free Zone.

In Las Vegas, Flagg builds a harsh authoritarian society from the survivors who pledge loyalty to him. Seeking to destroy the Boulder community, Flagg sends the Trashcan Man to locate a nuclear weapon. Back in Boulder, jealousy drives Harold—who resents Stu's leadership and loves Frannie—to ally himself with Nadine and secretly work for Flagg. After Mother Abagail temporarily leaves Boulder in a crisis of faith, the Free Zone committee sends three spies to infiltrate Las Vegas.

Harold and Nadine plant a bomb intended to kill Boulder's leadership during a council meeting. Most of the leaders escape following a psychic warning from Abagail, but several residents, including Nick, are killed in the explosion. Before dying, Abagail declares that Stu, Larry, Glen, and Ralph must journey west on foot to confront Flagg directly.

As the men travel across the desert, Stu breaks his leg and is forced to remain behind with Glen's dog, Kojak. The others continue on but are captured upon reaching Las Vegas. Glen is executed after openly defying Flagg. During a public spectacle meant to demonstrate Flagg's power, the Trashcan Man returns with a stolen nuclear warhead. A supernatural force manifests and detonates the weapon, destroying Las Vegas and killing Flagg and his followers.

Tom Cullen later rescues Stu, and the two witness the distant explosion before returning to Boulder during the winter. There they find the settlement rebuilding. Frannie has given birth to a daughter, and although the baby briefly contracts the virus, she survives. The community takes this as a sign that humanity can endure and begins the long process of restoring civilisation.

== Cast ==
- Gary Sinise as Stu Redman
- Molly Ringwald as Frannie Goldsmith
- Jamey Sheridan as Randall Flagg
- Laura San Giacomo as Nadine Cross
- Ruby Dee as Mother Abagail Freemantle
- Ossie Davis as Judge Richard Farris
- Miguel Ferrer as Lloyd Henreid
- Corin Nemec as Harold Lauder
- Matt Frewer as Trashcan Man
- Adam Storke as Larry Underwood
- Ray Walston as Glen Bateman
- Rob Lowe as Nick Andros
- Bill Fagerbakke as Tom Cullen
- Peter Van Norden as Ralph Brentner
- Bridgit Ryan as Lucy Swann
- Rick Aviles as Rat Man
- Sam Anderson as Whitney Horgan
- Max Wright as Dr. Herbert Denninger
- Shawnee Smith as Julie Lawry
- Cynthia Garris as Susan Stern
- Richard Jewkes as Dick Ellis
- Sarah Schaub as Gina McKone
- William Newman as Dr. Soames
- Kareem Abdul-Jabbar as The Monster Shouter
- Warren Frost as Dr. George Richardson
- John Bloom (aka Joe Bob Briggs) as Deputy Joe-Bob
- Troy Evans as Sheriff Johnny Baker
- Stephen King as Teddy Weizak
- John Landis as Russ Dorr
- Dan Martin as Rich Moffat
- John Dunbar as Dave Roberts
- Sam Raimi as Bobby Terry
- Chuck Adamson as Barry Dorgan
- Kellie Overbey as Dayna Jurgens
- Ray McKinnon as Charlie D. Campion
- Tom Holland as Carl Hough
- David Kirk Chambers as Brad Kitchner
- Kathy Bates as Rae Flowers (uncredited)
- Ed Harris as Gen. Bill Starkey (uncredited)
- Robert Knott as Major Len Creighton
- Sherman Howard as Dr. Dietz
- Ken Jenkins as Peter Goldsmith
- Richard Lineback as Poke Freeman
- Leo Geter as Chad Norris
- Patrick Kilpatrick as Ray Booth
- Jordan Lund as Bill Hapscomb
- Jesse Bennett as Vic Palfrey
- Jim Haynie as Deputy Kingsolving
- Billy L. Sullivan as Joe
- Hope Marie Carlton as Sally Campion
- Mary Ethel Gregory as Alice Underwood
- Britney Lewis as Arlene
- Mike Lookinland as Sentry
- Bill Corso as the voice of corpses

== Development ==
=== As a theatrical film ===
King and George A. Romero's first conversations with each other were about the development of an adaptation of 'Salem's Lot (1975) in the late 1970s, and although Romero would not be involved in any adaptation of that novel, he did express interest in adapting The Stand during these discussions. While King initially did not think of the novel being worthy of a film version, Romero's reasons were the amount of traveling he could do, as the novel takes place in several locations, and the story's relevance to social issues.

Due to the epic style of the novel demanding a huge budget, King and Romero's primary concern was possibly having to deal with financing from major studios, which would likely have meant losing a lot of artistic control or worsening studio reputation if the film was a box office bomb. King recalled in a 1980 interview of Hollywood middlemen were skeptical of Romero's idea of The Stand becoming a feature-length picture for the story's scale. There were some studios that did offer King and Romero several option contracts for adapting The Stand shortly after the novel's release, but the two turned all of them down.

At the same time, Laurel Entertainment's Richard P. Rubinstein was also obsessed with trying to produce a film of The Stand since the book had been published in 1978, and it became Laurel's pet project throughout the adaptation's development as a theatrical production. In the summer of 1979, talks began between Romero and Rubinstein, and they came up with an idea of how to fund it independently: by producing Creepshow, a low-budget original film that would create a huge profit and increase Laurel's credibility. Both Creepshow and The Stand were first announced in a summer 1980 edition of Cinefantastique, and Romero's attachment to direct the theatrical version of The Stand was printed on the second-edition paperback-printings of the novel. Stephen King completed the first draft of the screenplay in early 1981.

Warner Bros. initially wanted King to do a single, two-hour script, but he ended up turning in a screenplay that was over 400 pages (equivalent to six hours in length). Creepshow was released in 1982 to commercial success, and The Stand project garnered the interest of Warner Bros., a company that placed it into development. The budget for The Stand was set around $15–25 million just after Creepshow's release.

As of September 1982, King had completed two drafts of The Stand. The second draft planned for it to be a two-film series with each movie being two hours. However, Laurel, by the completion of King's third draft in December 1983, switched the plan to one three-hour film.

Dario Argento stated in a 1983 interview that he was once approached to direct a film version of The Stand but rejected the offer due to a lack of interest in working on adaptations.

King completed the final draft circa 1986. Despite Romero's initial excitement, he grew increasingly distant from the project due to the poor box office performance of King's films in the 1980s and conflicts between him and Rubinstein leading him to leave Laurel.

Hollywood significantly increased their interest in screen adaptations of King's work after the box office success of Pet Sematary (1989), and many were being pitched in studios following the film's release; one of these was an adaptation of The Stand, which was reported in a January 1990 Cinefantastique article to be "the most anticipated" developing King project. Stephen King's most popular novel among fans, The Stand was controversial as a film adaptation from the beginning. Nevertheless, King began working on a screenplay based on the book for Rubinstein.

King wrote a 700-page screenplay and then made five attempts to condense it into a 130-page script. Rubinstein disliked King's drafts, suggesting the author knew the novel too closely. Thus, he hired Rospo Pallenberg for screenwriting duties and planned for John Boorman to direct. Rubinstein and Laurel were very serious about the project to the point where they paid Pallenberg $30,000 for just one treatment. However, nothing further materialized. As King put it simply, there was "too much story for a movie", and yet he was skeptical about making a TV version of the book because "you can't have the end of the world brought to you by Charmin toilet tissue."

=== As a television miniseries ===
In June 1992, King figured that a miniseries was a way to present most of the novel's contents without having to deal with the other broadcast Standards and Practices regular television shows face. He spent four months writing a 420-page first draft without using his or Pallenberg's theatrical film drafts as reference. He submitted the draft to ABC, which offered King the ability for the script to be produced just days after submission. The network also had to follow conditions that it could not throw so many Standards and Practices at him that it would ruin the spirit of the source material.

Worried about disappointing fans, King took six months just to write one draft, "and then there were two more". King wrote six drafts of the miniseries before production began. Only minor changes were made in writing the miniseries, and while it is not based on the 1990 expanded version of the novel, the first scenes of the miniseries are taken from that edition. ABC still had discussions with King and Garris about certain plot elements likely not following practices, such as the use of a mummified child doll, a man on a cross wearing a crown of drug needles with the sign "Drug Addict" on his neck, and open-eyed corpses. A lot of these, however, were kept in the final product because of expectations from fans of The Stand.

While ABC and Rubinstein suggested Brian De Palma to direct The Stand, King chose Mick Garris after viewing his work for Psycho IV: The Beginning (1990) and the 1992 film version of King's Sleepwalkers. King thought the director was good at just being a "medium" that did not alter the story's original message. King told Garris about the project while both were on the set of Sleepwalkers, and Garris signed on due to the content's unusual fantasy elements and the large scale of the production he would be dealing with, such as in effects, outdoor locations, action sequences, and the number of extras.

=== Casting ===
Despite the script's 125-plus speaking roles, casting for The Stand was very easy except for one character: Randall Flagg. While Miguel Ferrer, who was ultimately cast as Lloyd Henreid, was interested in the part, Garris and King had other plans, searching for several prominent actors for the part, such as Christopher Walken, Jeff Goldblum, Willem Dafoe, James Woods, Lance Henriksen, and David Bowie; none of them were available. Steve Johnson recalled Garris' ideas of a possible Flagg actor to be "a bit against normal kinds of view points in casting". King himself had suggested Robert Duvall in his introduction to the novel. Ultimately, after seeing a lesser-known Jamey Sheridan as a psycho killer in Whispers in the Dark (1992), King considered him for the part. As King explained, "when he came into readings, he said, 'Flagg is really a funny guy, isn't he?' And I was sold."

Moses Gunn had originally been cast as Judge Farris, but shortly after filming had commenced his health declined, and he died shortly after that. Ossie Davis, who was present at the filming because his wife, Ruby Dee, was playing Mother Abagail, took over the role of Judge Farris. Whoopi Goldberg was approached by the casting team for Mother Abagail, but could not take the role as she was working on Sister Act 2: Back in the Habit (1993). Goldberg would later play Abagail in a 2020 web miniseries version of The Stand. When Dee was offered the role of Abagail, she felt she "was" the character and "my whole life has been research for Mother Abagail." Rob Lowe had been originally considered for the role of Larry Underwood, but Lowe felt that playing the more unusual role of the deaf and mute Nick Andros would be a great challenge and was able to convince Garris that it would better suit the production (Lowe has been deaf in his right ear since childhood). Adam Storke ended up with the role of Underwood, where his musical skills were an asset.

Bates's character, Rae Flowers, was originally a man (Ray Flowers), but when Bates became available, King – who wanted her to play the part – rewrote the role as a woman. King played Teddy Weizak, the first character he played that was intelligent and not a typecast "country asshole". He has less of a presence in the miniseries, as King "had a lot of other fish on a lot of other griddles that I was trying to fry all at once." This also meant some of the lines Weizak originally meant to speak were transferred to Garris' character Henry Dunbarton.

== Production ==
=== Budget ===
Despite the large scale of The Stand, ABC did not cover all of its production costs and Laurel "lost its shirt" when it came to budgeting; the network expected Laurel to profit from worldwide distribution and home media sales, as it was owned by Blockbuster Video and the miniseries would get a worldwide distribution from one of the company's subsidiaries, Worldvision Enterprises. The total budget was $26 million, more than double that of all previous ABC King miniseries where it would be set at $12 million. With $3 million used for development, however, $23 million was used for production, leaving only $6 million for each two-hour episode.

=== Filming ===
The shooting of The Stand, which lasted for six months, took on a style of guerrilla filmmaking, where it was shot on a 16mm film camera. Filming took place in at least two different locations each day, "places I hadn't seen until we began shooting there," Garris explained, and the effects artists had to do their job at a lower-than-usual price. Garris did everything he could to emphasize the miniseries' scale, such as filming wide shots of all the locations. Production designer Nelson Coates created all of the production's 225 sets. The dream version of Abagail's house involved a week of redressing the reality version of the home, with the design being inspired by The Cabinet of Dr. Caligari where "none of the lines were straight up and down" and "unreal colors" were used.

Filming began in Salt Lake City in February 1993 for what was originally the parts of the novel that took place in Boulder, Colorado. These scenes were initially planned to be shot in Boulder, but after the passage of Colorado Amendment 2, which nullified local gay rights laws, protests as well as the production team not morally agreeing with the amendment, led them not to shoot there. Shooting was moved to Utah, a state that had many Stephen King fans and religious people that related to the themes of the original novel, and four months of filming were done in Utah locations during what would be the state's bitterest winter in 100 years. The interior shots were done first with the plan that the snow would melt later on, only for that not to happen. This resulted in shots that featured weather not originally planned to be part of the plot, which worked in favor of some sequences in Garris's opinion.

For filming the gas station scene, they had to deal with freezing cold rain. There were supposed to be close-up shots of Stu Redman being still, but it was impossible for Sinise to not shake from the cold weather. Thus, the close-up shots were rejected. It was also tough for Sinise to deliver lines in filming days following the shoot. The harsh weather also caused another unforeseen problem, as being faced with prices of $40 per stalk for New York-made fake cornstalks, Coates opted instead to grow 3,250 cornstalks as a cost-cutting measure, but when a winter storm hit Utah, the reproduction of a Nebraska house with cornfield became complicated by the fact that the harsh weather did not allow the corn crop to grow taller than 4 feet.

The jail sequences were shot for three days at the sex offender wing of the Utah State Prison. However, the effects crew who were working on dead body dummies in the cells were unaware of this on the first day of shooting at the location and assumed it was an unused wing. The prison actually moved the sex offenders out of their cells for the miniseries, but the prisoners' belongings were left in the cells only for members of the effects team to confuse them as props by the art directors. On the first shooting day, the effects people moved all of the props from one cell to another, and the next day, several letters were written by prisoners and attached to their respective cells, ranging from angry responses to bids for King to sign an autograph.

The miniseries was then shot in Las Vegas following the Utah shoots.

=== Effects ===
I just wanted to do the best possible job I could because I really wanted to do justice to the material. And I wanted to make Stephen [King] happy because he's made me so happy with all of his work. So we just kicked ass on this job. We did everything we could to make certain that every aspect of everything we touched was perfect. And I have to say that it's probably one of the cleanest shows that's ever come out of the shop for that reason.

— Johnson, 1994

While many effects companies were interested in working on The Stand, Garris chose a colleague he knew for a very long time but never worked on a project with: Steve Johnson. Johnson had a been fan of King's books since twelve years before he started working on the miniseries, and the original novel was his favorite book by the author; he described it as "a dream come true" to work with King on set.

Johnson's team XFX did Abagail's age makeup, Flagg's demonic heads, the Trashcan Man's burn make-up, 60 dummies of the dead bodies, and facial hair controlled with electrostatics. The corpses of the flu victims were intended to be dummies rather than "movie monster[s]," Garris described. Bill Corso, a member of the effects team for The Stand, voices two of the corpses.

==== Randall Flagg ====
To work with Sheridan's clean-cut look in working on Randall Flagg's normal make-up, Johnson came up with the idea of adding a longer-hair wig for a more abrasive look.

The source material's religious elements were referred to when designing Flagg's demon incarnations. According to writer Michael Beeler, Flagg's goat head was a "traditional concept of what evil in human form would be". In order for the ram horns to glow, they were made out of translucent substance with illumination coming from a backlight. For Flagg's hands, the effects team went for a recurring theme of eccentricities in how they worked, such as the extending of a third finger for symbolizing the devil's existence. In the scene where Flagg raises his fist at Abagail, the original screenplay presented him as having it clenched throughout; however, Johnson came up with a representation of Stigmata by first showing Flagg's palm with blood spewing out and then clenching it into a fist. The split-second shot of Flagg's fingers flexing backwards was done with the hand palm up, but the actor wore an appliance for a palm down illusion.

For the scarecrow form, Johnson was initially skeptical to create one due to the idea of it being "kind of silly" and attempted to persuade Garris not to include it. The two ultimately decided to produce a "rotted" version of the scarecrow, meaning the stitching of the fabric, as Beeler put it, "makes it appear as if it has scars all across its face that are coming apart at the seams with dust and sawdust falling out whenever it speaks". Johnson later admitted that the scarecrow was his favorite Flagg incarnation of the miniseries. For a silhouette shot of the scarecrow in the cornfield, the shape of the character's eyes and mouth are indicated through a glowing effect. The radiating contact lenses used on the eyes were previously made by XFX for the film Innocent Blood (1992), while a light-emitting diode palate for the mouth was created by Rick Baker colleague Mark Setraikien and triggered via wires under Sheridan's make-up.

XFX members came up with multiple concepts for the scarecrow's hair, with Johnson suggesting a set of mushrooms, flowers, and moss growing around it. He also thought of worms and cockroaches crawling in the hair for close-up shots, but when they were placed on Sheridan's hair during a test, the actor freaked out and Johnson thought it "wouldn't have read on film anyway." The final result was that the hair was made of "muddy, twisted roots growing out of his head" which Johnson thought "looked the creepiest".

While Tom Barham of New York's Image Group company handled the morphing FX, Garris came up with the idea of having Flagg's head morph executed in a way different from the traditional media morph of one head design just melting into another: inside out. Not only was it different, but also a way to work around the limited budget as the morphing could look "active" without the camera having to move. In creating Flagg's morphs, Sheridan first filmed the scene on set without his makeup on. Then, on a greenscreen stage in Las Vegas, he was filmed doing the exact same action with makeup on, the camera set at precisely the same angle and character distance as the original shot. Both shots were then combined in post-production. The green-screening technique was done due to the amount of time it took to get Flagg's make-up on, which was at minimum three hours.

==== Trashcan Man ====
Six stages of burn make-up were placed on Frewer, such as when the Trashcan Man is burned by an oil factory explosion, a really hot desert sun, and radiation from an atomic bomb.

==== Facial hair ====
The growing facial hair effect seen on the extras was done by Camille Calvetty through a technique involving electrostatic charges. On each actor, she would first put adhesive all throughout the face, then trim the hair "to the right length" for it to be placed in a device that grows the hair through an electric charger. While this technique had been done on past films and television series, The Stand was the first ever production that involved it being applied to several extras. The varying amount of loose hair and make-up on each extra complicated the process according to Johnson: "You don't have a lot of control. So it takes an incredible amount of maintenance and a lot of patience to keep it looking good."

== Releases ==
=== Original broadcast ===
No.	Title	Directed by	Written by	Original release date
1	"The Plague"	Mick Garris	Stephen King	May 8, 1994
2	"The Dreams"	Mick Garris	Stephen King	May 9, 1994
3	"The Betrayal"	Mick Garris	Stephen King	May 11, 1994
4	"The Stand"	Mick Garris	Stephen King	May 12, 1994

== Soundtrack ==
Stephen King's The Stand (Original Television Soundtrack)

Soundtrack album (Digital download)/Audio CD by W. G. Snuffy Walden
- Released: May 24, 1994
- Length: 46:40
- Label: Varèse Sarabande

=== Credits and personnel ===
- Music composed by W. G. Snuffy Walden
- Executive producer: Robert Townson
- Produced by W. G. Snuffy Walden
- Music recorded and mixed by Ray Pyle and Avram Kipper at O'Henry Studios, Devonshire Studios and Taylor Made Studios
- Music editor: Allan K. Rosen
- Synclavier programming by Mark Morgan
- Orchestrations by Don Davis and John Dickson
- Scoring contractors: Paul Zimmitti and Debbi Datz
- Principal musicians:
  - Guitar: W. G. Snuffy Walden and Dean Parks
  - Piano: Randy Kerber
  - Percussion: Michael Fisher
  - Woodwinds: Jon Clarke
  - Violin: Charlie Bisharat

== Broadcast ==
ABC aired the highly anticipated miniseries in May 1994 for two reasons: it was a sweeps month, and it was the earliest month that did not have new episodes of Monday Night Football and Roseanne in the line-up. All four parts were viewed by approximately 19 million homes, with Part 1 receiving a rating/share of 20.1/32, Part 2 receiving 21.0/32, Part 3 receiving 20.1/31, and Part 4 receiving 20.0/31.

== Reception ==
=== Critical response ===
The miniseries received generally positive reviews. On the review aggregator website Rotten Tomatoes, 67% of 24 critics' reviews are positive. The website's consensus reads: "Based on Stephen King's magnum opus of a novel, The Stand delivers six hours of vintage denim, questionable special effects, and an all-star cast battling the forces of good and evil." Metacritic, which uses a weighted average, assigned the film a score of 61 out of 100, based on 17 critics, indicating "generally favorable" reviews.

John J. O'Connor of The New York Times wrote that "a great deal of time and money has gone into this production, and it's right up there on the screen", though he felt that once the narrative settled into its central conflict between good and evil "monotony begins to seep through the superstructure". Despite these reservations, he concluded that the series remained compelling enough to keep viewers wondering what might happen next.

Writing for Los Angeles Times, Howard Rosenberg described the miniseries as an ambitious television production that attempted to capture the scale of Stephen King's novel, noting both the challenges of adapting such a lengthy work and the production's impressive scope.

Ken Tucker of Entertainment Weekly gave the miniseries a positive review, praising the large ensemble cast and the faithfulness of King's teleplay to the tone of the original novel, while noting that the production occasionally struggled under the weight of the story's epic scope.

Retrospective commentary has been more mixed. Emily Stephens of The A.V. Club wrote that the miniseries "does not stand the test of time", criticizing its pacing and the limited depiction of the rebuilding of the Boulder Free Zone.

In retrospective rankings of television adaptations of King's work, The Stand has often been placed among the most notable. In a 2014 list by The New York Observer, the miniseries ranked second among Stephen King television adaptations, behind It (1990), with the publication praising the performances of the ensemble cast.

== Awards and nominations ==
Year	Award	Category	Nominee(s)	Result	Ref.
1994	Artios Awards	Best Casting for TV Miniseries	Lynn Kressel	Won	
1994	Primetime Emmy Awards	Outstanding Miniseries	Richard P. Rubinstein, Stephen King, Mitchell Galin, and Peter R. McIntosh	Nominated	
1994	Primetime Emmy Awards	Outstanding Individual Achievement in Art Direction for a Miniseries or a Special	Nelson Coates, Burton Rencher, Michael Perry, and Susan Benjamin	Nominated	
1994	Primetime Emmy Awards	Outstanding Individual Achievement in Cinematography for a Miniseries or a Special	Edward J. Pei	Nominated	
1994	Primetime Emmy Awards	Outstanding Individual Achievement in Makeup for a Miniseries or a Special	Steve Johnson, Bill Corso, David Dupuis, Joel Harlow, Camille Calvet, and Ashlee Petersen	Won	
1994	Primetime Emmy Awards	Outstanding Individual Achievement in Music Composition for a Miniseries or a Special (Dramatic Underscore)	W. G. Snuffy Walden	Nominated	
1994	Primetime Emmy Awards	Outstanding Sound Mixing for a Drama Miniseries or a Special	Grant Maxwell, Michael Ruschak, Richard Schexnayder, and Don Summer	Won	
1995	Cinema Audio Society Awards	Outstanding Achievement in Sound Mixing for Television – Movie of the Week or Mini-Series	Grant Maxwell, Michael Ruschak, Richard Schexnayder, and Don Summer	Nominated	
1995	Saturn Awards	Best Single Genre Television Presentation		Nominated	
1995	Screen Actors Guild Awards	Outstanding Performance by a Male Actor in a Television Movie or Miniseries	Gary Sinise	Nominated	

== Home media ==
The Stand was first released on DVD as a "Special Edition" in the United States on October 26, 1999, which contains only a Dolby Digital 2.0 audio-mix of its original language, and no subtitles. When The Stand was included on an unnamed September 25, 2007 DVD set that also featured The Langoliers (1995) and Golden Years (1991), Dolby Digital 2.0 Spanish and mono Portuguese dubs were added. The DVD including those features was issued separately on June 18, 2013. On June 12, 2018, it was part of another King adaptation collection that included The Langoliers, Golden Years, The Dead Zone (1983), Pet Sematary (1989), Silver Bullet (1986), and Graveyard Shift (1990).

The Stand was later released on DVD in the United Kingdom on April 5, 2004, Denmark on October 9, 2007 and Finland on October 10, 2007. The British versions features Dolby Digital 2.0 tracks in English, French, German, and Spanish; and subtitles in English, German, Portuguese, Spanish, Croatian, Czech, Danish, Hebrew, Icelandic, Norwegian, Polish, Slovenian, Swedish, and Turkish subtitles. The Danish and Finnish versions include the same audio tracks as the British edition (plus an Italian dub) but there are significant differences when it comes to subtitle settings; the UK's Portuguese, Croatian, Slovenian, Czech, Turkish, and Hebrew subtitles are removed with the addition of Finnish, Dutch, French, and Italian subtitles.

The Stand was issued on Blu-ray in Spain on September 18, 2019; the United States and Canada on September 24, 2019; Germany on September 26, 2019; the United Kingdom on October 7, 2019; Finland, Norway, and Sweden on October 14, 2019; and Denmark on October 17, 2019.

== See also ==
- The Stand (2020 miniseries)
- Pandemic

== Works cited ==
- Beeler, Michael (April 1994a). "TV Horror Epic: The Stand". Cinefantastique. Vol. 25, no. 2. pp. 8–9, 11, 14, 17–18, 22.
- Beeler, Michael (April 1994b). "Working with Stephen King". Cinefantastique. Vol. 25, no. 2. pp. 16–17.
- Bernstein, Abbie (September 1994). "Stand and Deliver". Bloody Best of Fangoria. Vol. 13. pp. 18–23, 75.
- Gagne, Paul (Spring 1981). "Stephen King". Cinefantastique. Vol. 10, no. 4. pp. 9–10.
- Gagne, Paul (September 1982). "Creepshow". Cinefantastique. Vol. 13, no. 1. pp. 16–34.
- Warren, Bill (May 1994a). "The Long Road to The Stand". Fangoria. No. 132. pp. 28–33.
- Warren, Bill (June 1994b). "Stephen King Takes The Stand". Fangoria. No. 133. pp. 40–45, 82.
- Wiater, Stanley (June 1980). "Stephen King and George Romero: Collaboration in Terror". Fangoria. No. 6. pp. 26–27.
- Wood, Gary (April 1994). "Development Movie Hell". Cinefantastique. Vol. 25, no. 2. pp. 19–21.
