= Monsters (American TV series) =

American horror anthology television series (1988–1991)

- Release poster
- Genre: Horror; Comedy drama Science fiction Fantasy
- Created by: Richard P. Rubinstein, Mitchell Galin
- Theme music composer: Donald Rubinstein
- Country of origin: United States
- Original language: English
- No. of seasons: 3
- No. of episodes: 72 (list of episodes)

Production
- Executive producer: Richard P. Rubinstein
- Producers: Erica Fox, Michael Gornick
- Production locations: New York, California
- Camera setup: Arriflex 16SRII (New York), Multicamera setup
- Running time: 22 min.
- Production companies: Laurel Entertainment; Tribune Entertainment Company

Original release
- Network: Syndicated
- Release: October 22, 1988 – April 26, 1991

Related
- Tales from the Darkside

Monsters is an American syndicated horror anthology television series which originally ran from October 22, 1988 to April 26, 1991 and reran on the Sci-Fi Channel during the 1990s.

The series grew out of Tales from the Darkside, the previous project by producer Richard P. Rubinstein and his company Laurel Entertainment. Unlike Tales from the Darkside, which sometimes featured science fiction and fantasy stories, Monsters was strictly horror-based. As the name implies, most episodes feature a different monster with which the story was concerned, from the animatronic puppet of a fictional children's television program to mutated, weapon-wielding lab rats.

== Synopsis ==
In the show's self-referencing title sequence, a suburban family of monsters look for something to watch on television before finally settling on Monsters, their favorite show. Each episode is a standalone tale, and feature a variety of monsters from vicious man-eating plants to friendly aliens from outer space.

Monsters is generally considered a horror anthology, but the show was about monsters, whether in a horror context or not. Producer/creator Richard P. Rubinstein said he wanted the show to be "a mixture of fun and scare", and for the monsters to be creatures of fantasy and fairy tales rather than more realistic menaces such as serial killers.

== Production ==
Richard P. Rubinstein had grown frustrated that while his company Laurel Productions' show Tales from the Darkside got good reviews, praise tended to focus on the stories and acting, with almost no mention of the makeup and special effects. Laurel decided to put together a demo reel of all the makeup effects they had done. They took the reel to Tribune Entertainment Company, one of their collaborators on Tales from the Darkside, and together they decided to create Monsters.

The start of production was delayed several months by the 1988 Writers Guild of America strike. Monsters went into production August 8, 1988 (the day after the strike ended), and began airing October 22.

Renowned makeup artist Dick Smith was hired as a special makeup effects consultant. The show was produced at a budget of roughly $200,000 per episode, much lower than what was typical for network television shows.

The show's stable of directors included Bette Gordon, Ernest D. Farino, Gerald Cotts (directing as "Jerry Smith") and Jeffrey Wolf. The writing staff included Edithe Swensen, Peg Haller and Bob Schneider, Michael Reaves, and Benjamin Carr (writing as "Neal Marshall Stevens").

Each episode's credits has a dedication to the show's creative consultant, Tom Allen, who died during production.

== Episodes ==
There were 72 episodes of the series produced over three seasons, which consisted of 24 episodes each.

== Home media ==
eOne Entertainment released the complete series on DVD in Region 1 in February 2014.
