= Journey to Everest =

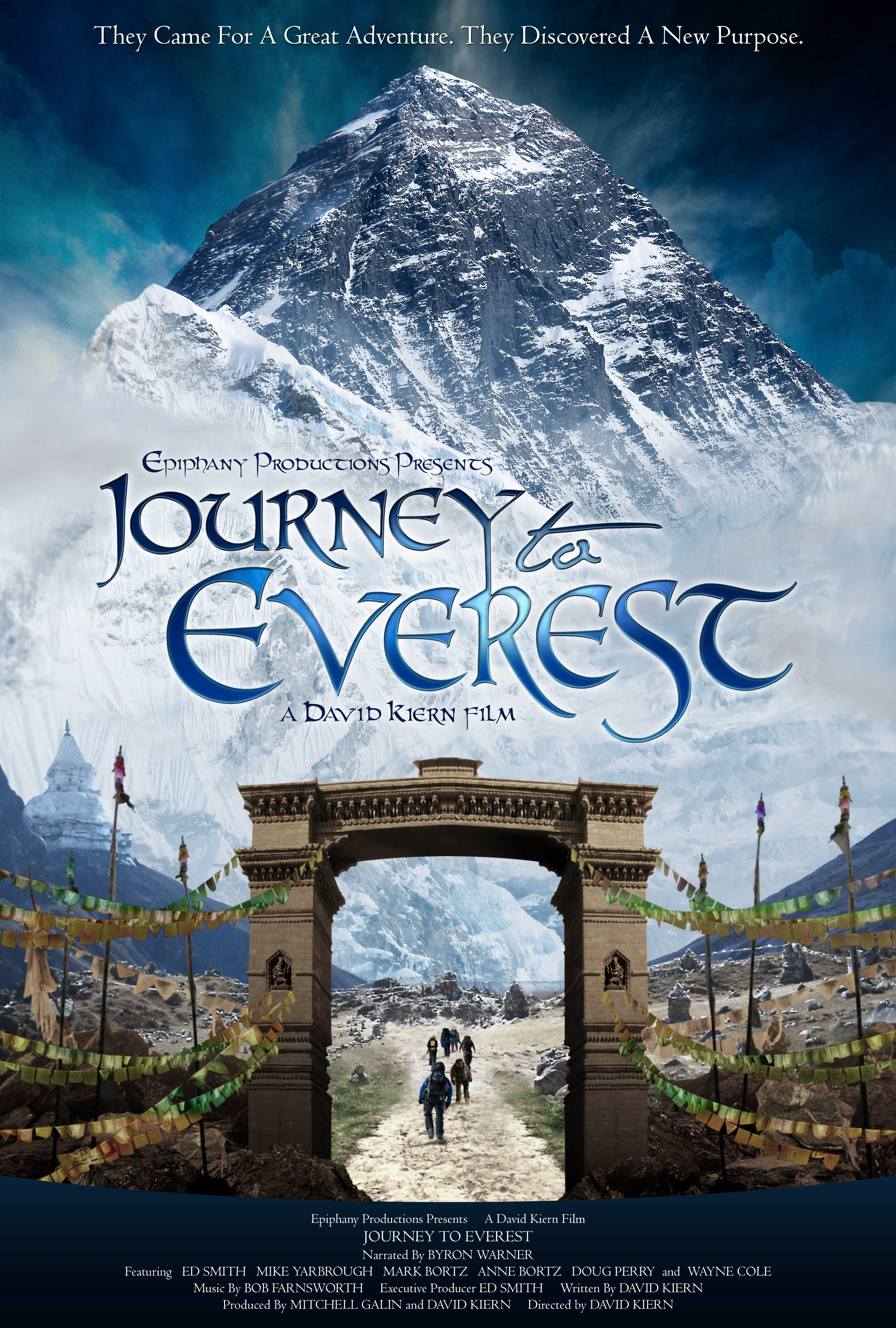
- Theatrical Poster
- Directed by: David Kiern
- Produced by: Mitchell Galin; David Kiern; Ed Smith
- Starring: Ed Smith; Mike Yarbrough; Mark Bortz; Anne Bortz; Doug Perry; Wayne Cole
- Narrated by: Byron Warner
- Cinematography: David Kiern
- Edited by: David Kiern
- Music by: Bob Farnsworth
- Production company: Epiphany Documentary Films
- Release date: August 20, 2009
- Running time: 55 minutes
- Country: United States
- Language: English

Journey to Everest is a 2009 Christian adventure documentary film. Directed by David Kiern and produced by Mitchell Galin for Epiphany Documentary Films, it follows the story of six Americans as they trek to Mount Everest.

== Plot ==
Journey to Everest follows the adventures of a team of six American businessmen who travel to the Himalayas to trek to Everest Base Camp. On their way into the mountains to begin their ascent, they are bumped from a plane flight that crashes and kills 18 people.

After the crash, the team begins to re-think their own lives and the time that they have now been given. As they struggle with their decision of whether to continue on their trek, their faith comes into the fore as they experience the Hindu/Buddhist world of Kathmandu, Nepal, face the challenges of the Everest Region, and discover the depths of who they are as Christians in a life-altering way.

== Production ==
Journey to Everest was filmed in October 2008 in Kathmandu and the Everest Region of Nepal. Among the exotic locations visited were Swayambhunath Temple, Durbar Square, Pashupatinath Temple, Namche Bazaar, and a Buddhist monastery in Pangboche claiming to possess the skeletal hand of a Yeti.

== Release ==
The world premiere was held at Thoroughbred Cinemas in Franklin, TN, and was a benefit for local Nepali Refugees. The film received four Doves from The Dove Foundation. Mike Parker of Examiner.com said in his review, "'Journey to Everest' is an exquisitely produced documentary. Yes, it is about a quest to conquer the world’s highest peak, and yes, the cinematography is breathtaking. But 'Journey to Everest' is more…much more. It is as much about scaling the heights within your own soul as it is about reaching the summit. It is as much about learning to trust things you cannot see with your eyes as it is about trusting your teammates. It is as much about compassion as it is about conquering the natural world."

During the summer of 2010, the film screened in over 275 churches in an effort to support Christian ministries, specifically foreign missions.

Journey to Everest was selected to screen at the 2010 Gideon Film Festival, San Antonio Independent Christian Film Festival, and 2011 Attic Film Festival.
