= Tom Holland (filmmaker) =

American filmmaker (born 1943)

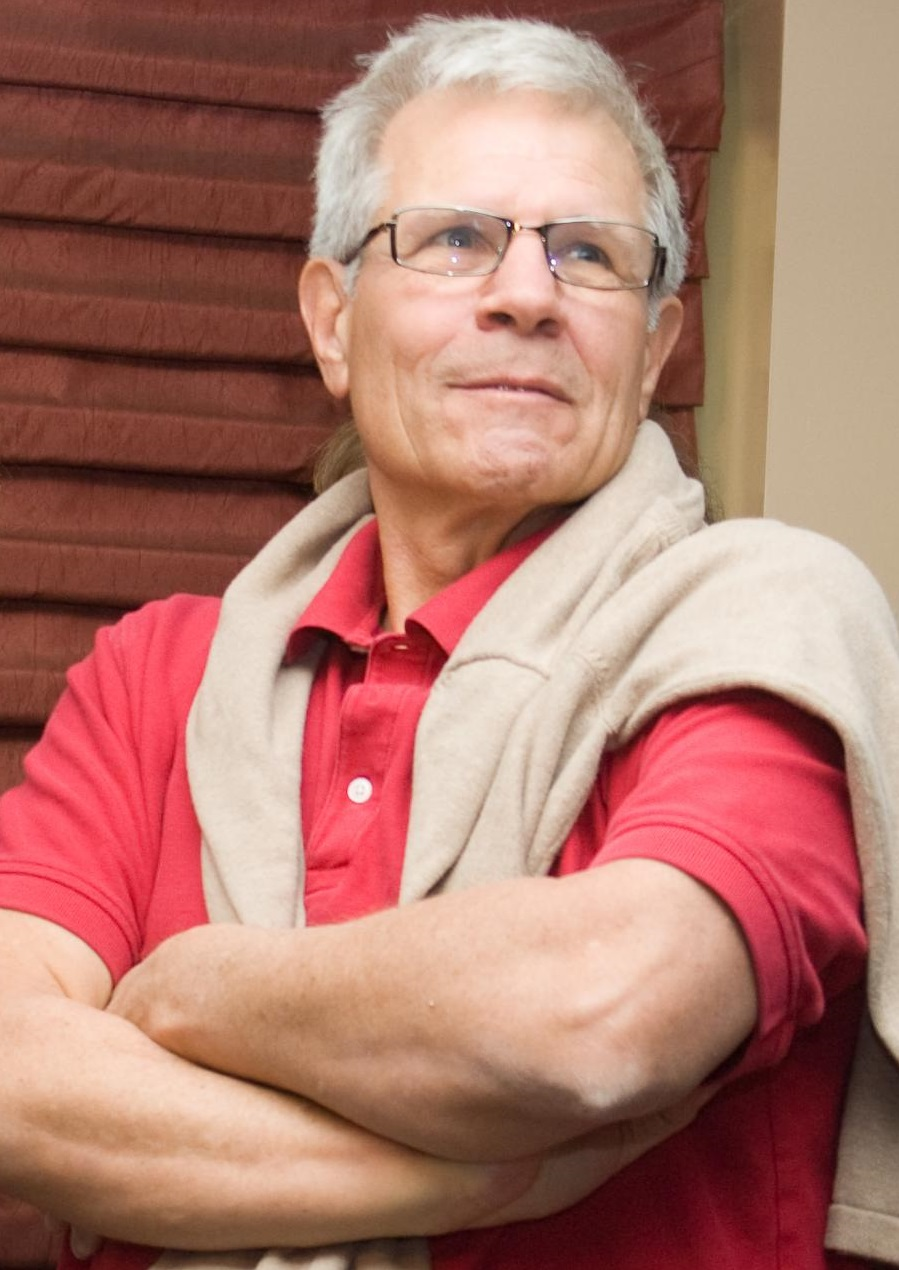
- Holland in 2008
- Born: Thomas Lee Holland; July 11, 1943 (age 83); Poughkeepsie, New York, U.S.
- Education: University of California, Los Angeles (BA, summa cum laude); UCLA School of Law (JD)
- Occupations: Film director; screenwriter; producer; actor
- Years active: 1958–present
- Notable work: Psycho II; Fright Night; Child's Play; Thinner; The Langoliers; Rock, Paper, Scissors
- Children: 1

Thomas Lee Holland (born July 11, 1943) is an American filmmaker, writer, and actor. He is best known for his work in the horror film genre, penning the screenplay for Psycho II (1983), the sequel to the classic Alfred Hitchcock film Psycho; writing and directing the cult vampire film Fright Night (1985); and directing and co-writing Child's Play (1988), the first entry in the long-running Child's Play franchise.

Holland also wrote and directed the Stephen King adaptations The Langoliers (1995) and Thinner (1996), and directed an episode of Masters of Horror (2007). He is a Saturn Award recipient for Best Writing for Fright Night, which also won the Avoriaz Dario Argento Award and the Fantasporto Critics' Award.

In 2020, Holland published his debut novel, The Notch, through Cemetery Dance Publications, and has continued expanding the Fright Night universe through novels, comic books, and a 40th anniversary cast reunion podcast.

== Early life and education ==
Holland was born on July 11, 1943, in Poughkeepsie, New York, to Lee and Tom Holland. His father worked for a department store chain, and the family relocated frequently during Holland's childhood. "By the time I was two, I had been in almost every state. I've been in five schools," Holland recalled in a 1966 interview. He later said that the experience of being perpetually new left him feeling like an outsider: "I always felt left out in school."

Holland attended Ossining Public High School in Ossining, New York, before transferring to Worcester Academy, where he graduated in 1962. At age 16, he apprenticed for a summer at the Bucks County Playhouse in New Hope, Pennsylvania.

After high school, Holland attended Northwestern University for one year, then transferred to New York University. He ultimately graduated from the University of California, Los Angeles (UCLA) in 1970. He subsequently earned a Juris Doctor from UCLA School of Law and passed the California Bar on his first attempt, receiving license number 61529.

In addition to his academic training, Holland trained at the Actors Studio under Lee Strasberg.

== Career ==
=== Acting career ===
Holland's first professional work was dubbing dialogue, and his television debut was on the Western series Temple Houston.

Holland's most significant early role was as a series regular on the ABC daytime soap opera A Flame in the Wind (later retitled A Time for Us), playing the character Steve Reynolds for approximately 50 episodes in 1965–66. During this period he also appeared in over 200 television commercials.

His film credits include A Walk in the Spring Rain (1970) with Anthony Quinn and Ingrid Bergman, and Model Shop (1969) directed by Jacques Demy. Television guest appearances included episodes of Combat!, Felony Squad, and The Incredible Hulk (1978, credited as "Tommy Lee Holland"). Holland has continued to take occasional acting roles in later decades. He played Deputy Norris in Psycho II (1983), for which he also wrote the screenplay. He appeared as Carl Hough in the ABC miniseries Stephen King's The Stand (1994), and had a cameo in The Langoliers (1995) in addition to writing and directing.

In December 2009, Holland was cast in Adam Green's Hatchet II, to star alongside Danielle Harris, Tony Todd, Kane Hodder, and R.A. Mihailoff. He narrated the film alongside Green at the 2010 San Diego Comic-Con.

=== Writing ===
Holland made his screenwriting debut with the 1978 made-for-television film The Initiation of Sarah. He made his feature film writing debut in 1982, adapting the Edward Levy novel The Beast Within into the film of the same title. That same year, he wrote Class of 1984, an urban thriller film centered on juvenile delinquency and punk subculture. The film proved controversial upon release and was heavily censored in the United Kingdom and outright banned in other countries. It has since become a cult classic.

Holland was hired by Universal Pictures to write a sequel to the 1960 Alfred Hitchcock film Psycho, which since its initial release had been acclaimed as not only a seminal and iconic horror film, but one of the greatest films of all time. Lead actor Anthony Perkins, who had previously displayed apprehension at appearing in a sequel, agreed to do the film after being impressed by Holland's screenplay. The film, directed by Richard Franklin and co-starring Meg Tilly, Robert Loggia, and Dennis Franz, opened at No. 2 at the box office (behind Return of the Jedi) and went on to gross $34 million.

Holland re-teamed with director Franklin the following year on his next film, Cloak & Dagger. Unlike their previous film, Cloak & Dagger was a spy film aimed at a younger audience, and starring Henry Thomas of E.T. the Extra-Terrestrial in its leading role. Despite positive critical reviews, the film was a financial failure, grossing $9,719,952 off of a 13 million dollar production budget.

In 2020, Holland published his debut novel, The Notch, through Cemetery Dance Publications. The thriller, which centers on a mute boy with healing powers who emerges from the desert amid a global pandemic, received endorsements from figures in the horror community including Clive Barker and Mick Garris. In 2022, Holland and co-author A. Jack Ulrich published Fright Night: Origins, a novel expanding upon the story of the original Fright Night film and the first installment in a planned trilogy. A second novel in the series, Fright Night: Aftermath, was announced in 2026.

=== Directing ===
Holland's directorial debut came in 1985 with the vampire horror film Fright Night. Holland first conceived of the premise during the writing of Cloak & Dagger, of a horror film fan who learns that his neighbor is a vampire. He chose to direct the film himself after being disappointed with Michael Winner's direction of his screenplay Scream for Help. The film was both financial and critical success, earning a rave review from Roger Ebert who wrote "Fright Night is not a distinguished movie, but it has a lot of fun being undistinguished." The film spawned a sequel in 1988 titled Fright Night Part 2, and a 2011 remake, Fright Night starring Colin Farrell and Anton Yelchin. That remake also had its own sequel, Fright Night 2: New Blood, which was released in 2013. Holland was not involved in any of the sequels or the remake.

After Fright Night Part 2 was released in 1988 without Holland's involvement, Holland and star Roddy McDowall began discussing a potential third film. McDowall set up a meeting with José Menendez, the head of Carolco Pictures subsidiary Live Entertainment, who had acquired the Fright Night rights. However, before the meeting could take place, Menendez and his wife were murdered by their sons on August 20, 1989, ending all prospects for a direct sequel. Holland remained friends with McDowall until the actor's death in 1998.

On October 28, 2020, Holland confirmed that he is writing a direct sequel to the original Fright Night titled Fright Night: Resurrection and that his sequel would ignore the 1988 sequel and be a proper sequel to his 1985 film.

In June 2024, Holland participated in a Fright Night 40th Anniversary Table Read Podcast, a full cast reunion featuring Chris Sarandon, William Ragsdale, Amanda Bearse, Stephen Geoffreys, and Jonathan Stark, with Mark Hamill reading the late Roddy McDowall's role of Peter Vincent. In October 2025, the prequel novel Fright Night: Hellbound by Michael Harbron was published in collaboration with Holland.

In 1988, Holland directed the film Child's Play, which received positive reviews from Ebert and Leonard Maltin, spawned a long-running franchise consisting of six sequels, and helped elevate its antagonist Chucky to a pop culture icon.

Holland directed three episodes of the HBO horror anthology series Tales from the Crypt: "Lover Come Hack to Me" (Season 1, Episode 5, 1989), written by Michael McDowell; "Four-Sided Triangle" (Season 2, Episode 9, 1990), co-written by Holland and featuring Patricia Arquette; and "King of the Road" (Season 4, Episode 9, 1992), written by Randall Jahnson and starring a then-unknown Brad Pitt. Holland recalled that upon meeting Pitt during casting, he saw "a movie star booming" in Pitt's presence.

He returned to television films with The Stranger Within.

==== Stephen King collaborations ====
Holland wrote and directed a 1995 ABC miniseries adaptation of the Stephen King novella "The Langoliers". The production was shot on 16mm film to reduce costs. King himself made a cameo appearance as a pharmacist, and Holland also appeared in a small role. The collaboration came about because King was a fan of both Fright Night and Child's Play, and producer Richard P. Rubinstein connected them.

Holland co-wrote (with Michael McDowell) and directed Thinner (1996), adapted from King's novel of the same name. The project had spent over a decade in development hell, with Holland stating it had been "turned down by almost every director in Hollywood" due to its bleak ending. Holland's son Josh Holland appeared in the film as Frank Spurton.

In 2007, Holland directed the episode "We All Scream for Ice Cream" for the Showtime anthology series Masters of Horror (Season 2, Episode 10), adapted by David J. Schow from a short story by John Farris. The episode starred William Forsythe and marked Holland's return to directing after an eleven-year hiatus following Thinner.

==== Unrealized projects ====
In 2012, Holland signed on to adapt King's short story "The Ten O'Clock People" from the collection Nightmares and Dreamscapes as a feature film. The project went through several casting iterations and location changes over multiple years before ultimately stalling in development.

=== Dead Rabbit Films ===
He and David Chackler founded the horror film company Dead Rabbit Films in 2009. Holland wrote and directed a horror anthology webseries titled Twisted Tales, which appeared on Fearnet in 2013 and was released on home media in 2014.

=== Documentary appearances ===
In 2016, the documentary You're So Cool, Brewster! The Story of Fright Night was released. Holland served as a creative consultant on the project, which runs approximately six hours across two discs and includes extensive interviews with the full Fright Night cast and crew, as well as dedicated featurettes on Holland's writing process and a tribute to the late Roddy McDowall.

=== Terror Time ===
Holland operates an online merchandise store called Terror Time, selling autographed memorabilia, scripts, and apparel related to his filmography.

== Personal life ==
Holland's son, Josh Holland, is an American actor who studied at the Royal Academy of Dramatic Art in London and San Diego State University. Josh appeared in his father's films The Temp (1993) and Thinner (1996).

Holland resides in Sherman Oaks, California.

== Filmography ==
=== Film ===
Year	Title	Functioned as		Notes
Year	Title	Director	Writer	Notes
1985	Fright Night	Yes	Yes	
1987	Fatal Beauty	Yes	No	
1988	Child's Play	Yes	Yes	
1993	The Temp	Yes	No	
1996	Thinner	Yes	Yes	
2006	Driven	Yes	Yes	Short
2008	5 or Die	Yes	No	Short
2010	To Hell with You	Yes	No	Short
2017	Rock, Paper, Scissors	Yes	No	

==== Writer only ====
- The Beast Within (1982)
- Class of 1984 (1982)
- Psycho II (1983)
- Cloak & Dagger (1984)
- Scream for Help (1984)
- Fright Night (2011) - Story

==== Executive producer ====
Year	Title	Notes
2016	You're So Cool, Brewster! The Story of Fright Night	Documentary film, also creative consultant
2016	What Is Fright Night?	Documentary short films
2016	Tom Holland and Amanda Bearse Talk Fright Night	Documentary short films
2016	Tom Holland: Writing Horror	Documentary short films
2016	Roddy McDowall: From Apes to Bats	Documentary short films
2016	A Beautiful Darkness: The Look of Regine	Documentary short films

==== Acting credits ====
Year	Title	Role	Notes
1963	America America	(voice)	Uncredited
1969	Model Shop	Gerry	
1969	Changes	Roommate	
1970	A Walk in the Spring Rain	Boy	
1972	Josie's Castle	Leonard Robbins	
1983	Psycho II	Deputy Norris	
2009	The Crystal Lake Massacres Revisited	Charles Brewster	Mockumentary short film
2010	Hatchet II	Bob	
2014	Digging Up the Marrow	Himself	
2015	Clowntown	The Clown with No Name	Short film
TBA	The Tarot	Uncle Walter	

=== Television ===
Year	Title	Functioned as			Notes
Year	Title	Director	Writer	Executive Producer	Notes
1986	Amazing Stories	Yes	No	No	Episode: "Miscalculation"
1989-92	Tales from the Crypt	Yes	Yes	No	Directed episodes: "Lover Come Hack to Me" & "King of the Road"; Written and directed episode: "Four-Sided Triangle"
1990	The Stranger Within	Yes	No	No	TV movie
1991	The Owl	Yes	Yes	Yes	Unsold pilot
1992	Two-Fisted Tales	Yes	No	No	TV movie; segment: "King of the Road"
1995	The Langoliers	Yes	Yes	No	Miniseries
2007	Masters of Horror	Yes	No	No	Episode: "We All Scream for Ice Cream"
2013	Twisted Tales	Yes	Yes	Yes	Web series (9 episodes)

Writer only

- The Initiation of Sarah (1978, TV movie) - Story
- The Initiation of Sarah (2006, TV movie) - Story

==== Acting credits ====
Year	Title	Role	Notes
1958	Telephone Time	Millsap	Episode: "Trail Blazer"
1964	77 Sunset Strip	Al Killian	Episode: "Lover's Lane"
1964	Bob Hope Presents the Chrysler Theatre	Vic Burns	Episode: "Out on the Outskirts of Town"
1965-66	A Flame in the Wind	Steve Reynolds #2	50 episodes
1967	Combat!	Pfc. Tommy Bishop	Episode: "Entombed"
1968	Felony Squad	LeRoy Baker	Episode: "Epitaph for a Cop"
1969	My Friend Tony	Unknown	Episode: "The Hazing"
1969	The Young Lawyers	David Harrison	Episode: "Pilot"
1969	Medical Center	Jess Yarnaby	Episode: "24 Hours"
1978	The Incredible Hulk	Steve Silva	Episode: "Another Path"
1983	The Winds of War	Devilfish Sub Captain	Episode: "Into the Maelstrom"
1991	The Owl	Mugger	Television pilot, appears uncredited in extended international version
1994	The Stand	Carl Hough	2 episodes
1995	The Langoliers	Harker	2 episodes
2007	Masters of Horror	Funeral Guest	Episode: "We All Scream for Ice Cream"
2010	Team Unicorn	Grandpa	Episode: "A Very Zombie Holiday"
2013	Twisted Tales	Himself / Janitor	Web series (9 episodes)
2015	20 Seconds to Live	Bystander	Episode: "Evil Doll"

== Bibliography ==
=== Novels ===
- The Notch (2020), Cemetery Dance Publications)
- Fright Night: Origins (2022), Holland House/Encyclopocalypse Publications) – co-written with A. Jack Ulrich; first book in a planned trilogy expanding the Fright Night universe
- Fright Night: Aftermath (2026) – co-written with A. Jack Ulrich; second book in the Fright Night novel trilogy

=== Children's books ===
- How to Scare a Monster (2018) – co-written with Dustin Warburton

== Critical reception ==
Film	Rotten Tomatoes score
The Beast Within (1982)	13%
Class of 1984 (1982)	75%
Psycho II (1983)	61%
Scream for Help (1984)	—N/a
Cloak & Dagger (1984)	64%
Fright Night (1985)	91%
Fatal Beauty (1987)	23%
Child's Play (1988)	69%
The Temp (1993)	29%
The Langoliers (1995)	50%
Thinner (1996)	16%
Fright Night (2011)	72%
Rock Paper Dead (2017)	—N/a

== Awards and nominations ==
Year	Award	Category	Film	Result
1984	Edgar Award	Best Motion Picture	Psycho II	Nominated
1986	Dario Argento Award	Best Film	Fright Night	Won
1986	Grand Prize	Best Film	Fright Night	Nominated
1986	Critics' Award	Special Mention	Fright Night	Won
1986	International Fantasy Film Award	Best Film	Fright Night	Nominated
1986	Saturn Award	Best Director	Fright Night	Nominated
1986	Saturn Award	Best Horror Film	Fright Night	Won
1986	Saturn Award	Best Writing	Fright Night	Won
1990	Saturn Award	Best Horror Film	Child's Play	Nominated
1990	Saturn Award	Best Writing; Shared with Don Mancini and John Lafia	Child's Play	Nominated
1996	Saturn Award	Best Television Presentation	The Langoliers	Nominated
