= Miguel Ferrer =

American actor (1955–2017)

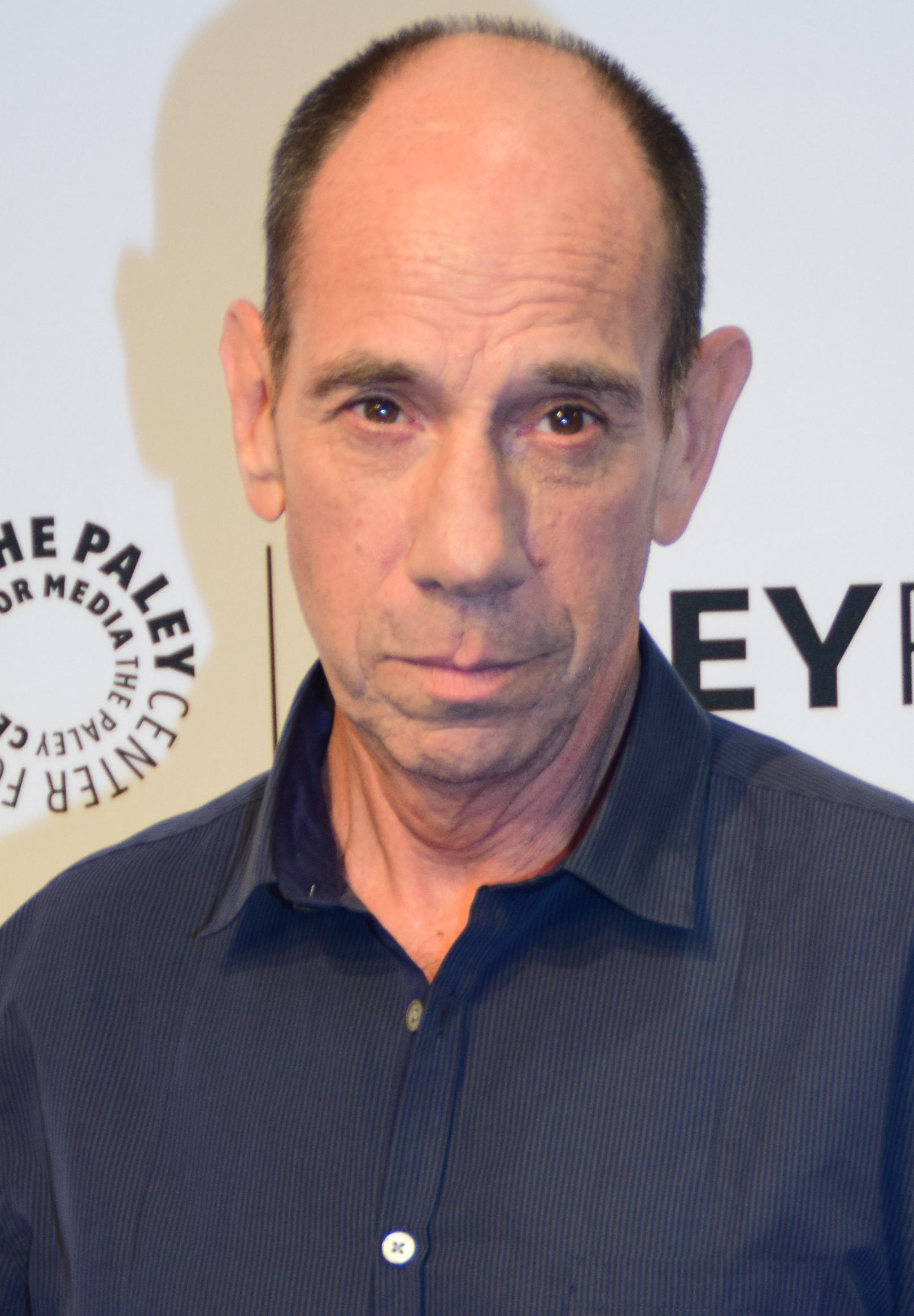
- Ferrer in 2015
- Born: Miguel José Ferrer; February 7, 1955; Santa Monica, California, U.S.
- Died: January 19, 2017 (aged 61); Santa Monica, California, U.S.
- Resting place: Santa María Magdalena de Pazzis Cemetery, San Juan, Puerto Rico
- Occupation: Actor
- Years active: 1981–2017
- Spouses: Leilani Sarelle (m. 1991; div. 2003); Lori Weintraub (m. 2005)
- Children: 2
- Parents: José Ferrer; Rosemary Clooney
- Relatives: Betty Clooney (aunt); Nick Clooney (uncle); George Clooney (cousin); Tessa Ferrer (niece)

Miguel José Ferrer (February 7, 1955 – January 19, 2017) was an American actor. His breakthrough role was as Bob Morton in the 1987 film RoboCop. Other film roles include Harbinger in Hot Shots! Part Deux (1993), Quigley in Blank Check (1994), Eduardo Ruiz in Traffic (2000) and Vice President Rodriguez in Iron Man 3 (2013). Ferrer's notable television roles include FBI Agent Albert Rosenfield on Twin Peaks (1990–1991, 2017), Dr. Garret Macy on Crossing Jordan (2001–2007) and NCIS Assistant Director Owen Granger on NCIS: Los Angeles (2012–2017).

Ferrer also performed voice acting in animated projects, including Shan Yu in Mulan (1998), Tarakudo on Jackie Chan Adventures (2000–2005), Vandal Savage in Young Justice (2010–2012), and Delgado in Beverly Hills Chihuahua 2 (2011).

== Early life ==
Ferrer was born on February 7, 1955, in Santa Monica, California. He was the oldest of five children born to Puerto Rican actor José Ferrer and American singer Rosemary Clooney.

Ferrer's siblings were sisters Maria and Monsita, and brothers Gabriel (later the husband of singer Debby Boone) and actor Rafael. He also had an older half-sister, Letty (Leticia) Ferrer, from his father José's prior marriage to Uta Hagen. Ferrer was an older cousin of actor George Clooney and nephew of journalist Nick Clooney.

Ferrer was raised in Hollywood and Beverly Hills and attended Beverly Hills High School. As a teenager, his interests tended toward music; he played the drums on Keith Moon's Two Sides of the Moon. After high school, Ferrer studied acting at the Beverly Hills Playhouse.

== Career ==
Ferrer's friend Bill Mumy cast him as a drummer in the series Sunshine, his first television role. Ferrer was also Mumy's bandmate in Seduction of the Innocent, a band that also consisted of Steve Leialoha and Max Allan Collins. Sharing a love of comics Ferrer and Mumy co-created Comet Man and Trypto the Acid Dog plus co-wrote the Marvel Graphic Novel The Dreamwalker.

Ferrer began his acting career in the early 1980s, making guest appearances on episodic television. He played the younger version of his father's character on Magnum, P.I. in 1981. In 1983, he was given a small part as a waiter in The Man Who Wasn't There. He also had a minor role in Star Trek III: The Search for Spock (1984) as the U.S.S. Excelsior first officer. In 1984, he directed the Mark Medoff play When Ya Coming Back, Red Ryder? at the Coconut Grove Playhouse in Miami, Florida. He had a major role in the 1987 action film RoboCop as the corporate executive Bob Morton, the young, ambitious executive of Omni Consumer Products' Security Concepts and project leader of the RoboCop program.

Ferrer's notable later roles include a sinister biker in Valentino Returns, an overzealous engineer in DeepStar Six (1989), a resourceful vigilante in Revenge (1990), Commander Arvid Harbinger in the comedy Hot Shots! Part Deux (1993), Lloyd Henreid in the Stephen King miniseries The Stand (1994), and a drug informant in Traffic (2000). He occasionally took on lead parts as well, such as The Harvest and The Night Flier.

In the early 1990s, Ferrer appeared on three primetime TV series simultaneously: as D.A. Todd Spurrier in Shannon's Deal (1989–1991), as Cajun cop Beau Jack Bowman in Broken Badges (1990–1991), and as cynical, wittily abrasive FBI forensics specialist Albert Rosenfield in Twin Peaks (1990–91). Ferrer reprised the role of Rosenfield in the film Twin Peaks: Fire Walk with Me (1992). Ferrer played a super-villain called "The Weatherman" in the 1997 TV pilot Justice League of America. Later in the same year, he provided the voice for a similar character, the Weather Wizard, in the Superman: The Animated Series episode "Speed Demons". In 1999, Ferrer voiced Aquaman in the Superman: The Animated Series episode "A Fish Story". The same year, at the 41st Grammy Awards, Ferrer was nominated for Best Spoken Word Album for Children in Disney's The Lion King II, "Simba's Pride Read-Along". He was also the protagonist of the American rock band Toto's music video for the song "I Will Remember", appearing alongside actor Edward James Olmos.

In 2000, Ferrer was slated to appear in the CBS live television play of Fail Safe alongside his cousin George Clooney. Cast in the role of U.S. Air Force Colonel Cascio, Ferrer rehearsed the live production with the rest of the cast for three weeks and was featured in promotional materials for the teleplay, but had to drop out before the live broadcast due to a commitment to shoot a pilot for NBC named Sheriff's Homicide based on the James Ellroy book My Dark Places. Ferrer was replaced in the role by John Diehl. The following year, Ferrer again played a medical examiner on the small screen, Dr. Garret Macy, in the television crime/drama series Crossing Jordan (2001–07). In August 2003, Ferrer made his New York stage debut in the off-Broadway production of The Exonerated. In 2004, Ferrer performed as the voice of the Heretic leader in the video game Halo 2. Ferrer took voice-over roles in the TV series Robot Chicken (2006) and American Dad! (2007). He played Jonas Bledsoe on NBC's Bionic Woman series and in 2009 also starred in another NBC series, Kings as a military commander.

Ferrer played Los Angeles Police Lieutenant Felix Valdez in the 2011 Lifetime police procedural drama, The Protector. Also in 2011 he had a multiple-episode guest role on the final season of Desperate Housewives. Signed to a recurring role in NCIS: Los Angeles as Naval Criminal Investigative Service Assistant Director Owen Granger, Ferrer was promoted to a series regular for the fifth season in 2013. Ferrer continued working on NCIS: Los Angeles even after he was diagnosed with cancer. He also appeared in the 2013 film Iron Man 3 as the Vice President of the United States. Ferrer reprised his role of Albert Rosenfield in the 2017 revival of Twin Peaks.

== Death ==
On January 19, 2017, Ferrer died at his Santa Monica home from complications of throat cancer at the age of 61. At the time of his death, Ferrer was married to producer Lori Weintraub. He had two sons and two stepsons.

== Legacy ==
Miguel O'Hara, the alter ego of the Marvel Comics superhero Spider-Man 2099, was named after Ferrer by his friend, writer Peter David, who co-created the character.

The Young Justice episode "Evolution" was dedicated to Ferrer. Following Ferrer's death, David Kaye took over his role as Vandal Savage as well as his role as Jonathan Rook/Stretch Monster in Stretch Armstrong and the Flex Fighters.

== Filmography ==
=== Film ===
Year	Title	Role	Notes
1982	Truckin' Buddy McCoy	Pete	
1982	And They Are Off		
1983	Heartbreaker	Angel	
1983	The Man Who Wasn't There	Waiter	
1984	Star Trek III: The Search for Spock	USS Excelsior first officer	
1984	Flashpoint	Roget	
1984	Lovelines	Dragon	
1987	RoboCop	Bob Morton	
1989	Deepstar Six	Snyder	
1989	Valentino Returns	Sinister biker	
1990	Revenge	Amador	
1990	The Guardian	Ralph Hess	
1992	Twin Peaks: Fire Walk with Me	Albert Rosenfield	
1992	The Harvest	Charlie Pope	
1993	Cigarettes & Coffee	Bill	Short film
1993	Point of No Return	Director Kaufman	
1993	Hot Shots! Part Deux	Commander Harbinger	
1993	Another Stakeout	Tony Castellano	
1993	It's All True: Based on an Unfinished Film by Orson Welles	Narrator (voice)	Documentary
1994	Blank Check	Carl Quigley	
1995	In the Line of Duty: Hunt for Justice	Tom Manning	TV film
1997	The Disappearance of Garcia Lorca	Centeno	
1997	The Night Flier	Richard Dees	
1997	Mr. Magoo	Mr. Ortega Peru	
1998	Mulan	Shan Yu (voice)	
1998	Where's Marlowe?	Joe Boone	
2000	Traffic	Eduardo Ruiz	
2002	Sunshine State	Lester	
2004	The Manchurian Candidate	Colonel Garret	
2004	Silver City	Cliff Castleton	
2005	The Man	Agent Peters	
2008	Justice League: The New Frontier	J'onn J'onzz / Martian Manhunter (voice)	Direct-to-video
2009	Wrong Turn at Tahoe	Vincent	
2010	Hard Ride to Hell	Jefe	
2011	Beverly Hills Chihuahua 2	Delgado (voice)	Direct-to-video
2011	Four Assassins	Eli	
2012	Noah	Kabos (voice)	
2012	The Courier	Mr. Capo	
2012	Beverly Hills Chihuahua 3: Viva la Fiesta!	Delgado (voice)	Direct-to-video
2013	Iron Man 3	Vice President Rodriguez	
2014	Rio 2	Big Boss (voice)	
2017	Teen Titans: The Judas Contract	Slade Wilson / Deathstroke (voice)	Direct-to-video; posthumous release

=== Television ===
Year	Title	Role	Notes
1981	Magnum, P.I.	Ensign Robert 'Bobby' Wickes, USN	Episode: "Lest We Forget"
1982–85	Trapper John, M.D.	Trauma Team Doctor, Dr. Austin, Darby Thud	3 episodes
1983	CHiPs	Bean	Episode: "Firepower"
1984	Cagney & Lacey	Nunzio	Episode: "Choices"
1984	Hill Street Blues	Carlos	Episode: "Ewe and Me, Babe"
1985	T. J. Hooker	Sonny Unger	Episode: "Love Story"
1987	Houston Knights	Virgilio	Episode: "Scarecrow"
1987	CBS Summer Playhouse	Mic	Episode: "Kung Fu: The Next Generation"
1987	Hotel	Brian	Episode: "All the King's Horses"
1987	Ohara	Kramer	Episode: "Artful Dodgers"
1987	Downpayment on Murder	Martin	Television film
1987, 1989	Miami Vice	Ramon Pedroza, District Attorney	2 episodes
1988	Hooperman	Scott Kapus	Episode: "Chariots of Fire"
1988	Badlands 2005	Rex	Pilot
1988	C.A.T. Squad: Python Wolf	Paul Kiley	Television film
1989	Guts and Glory: The Rise and Fall of Oliver North	Scott Toney	Television film
1989	Shannon's Deal	Todd Spurrier	Television film
1990	Drug Wars: The Camarena Story	Tony Riva	3 episodes
1990–1991	Twin Peaks	FBI Agent Albert Rosenfield	8 episodes
1990–1991	Shannon's Deal	D.A. Todd Spurrier	9 episodes
1990–1991	Broken Badges	Beau Jack Bowman	7 episodes
1990–1994	Tales from the Crypt	Gary; Hitman; Mitch Bruckner	3 episodes
1991	Murder in High Places	Wilhoite	Television film
1992	In the Shadow of a Killer	District Attorney Steven Walzer	Television film
1992	On the Air	Bud Budwaller	7 episodes
1992	Cruel Doubt	Lewis Young	2 episodes
1992	Roseanne	Dennis	Episode "Ladies' Choice"
1993	Scam	Barry Landers	Television film
1994	Royce	Gribbon	Television film
1994	Incident at Deception Ridge	Ray Hayes	Television film
1994	Biography	Narrator (voice)	Episode: "Bruce Lee: The Immortal Dragon"
1994	The Stand	Lloyd Henreid	4 episodes
1994	Jack Reed: A Search for Justice	Win Carter	Television film
1994	A Promise Kept: The Oksana Baiul Story	Stanislav	Television film
1995	The Return of Hunter: Everyone Walks in L.A.	Jack Valko	Television film
1995	In the Line of Duty: Hunt for Justice	Thomas Manning	Television film
1995	Fallen Angels	Prologue Narrator, Abbazzia	6 episodes
1996	Project ALF	Dexter Moyers	Television film
1997	Justice League of America	Dr. Eno / Weather Man	Pilot
1997–1999	Superman: The Animated Series	Aquaman, Weather Wizard, De'Cine (voice)	3 episodes
1998	Brave New World	Director of Hatcheries and Conditioning	Television film
1998	Men in Black: The Series	Dr. Lupo (voice)	Episode: "The Take No Prisoners Syndrome"
1998	Hercules	Antaeus (voice)	Episode: "Hercules and the Hostage Crisis"
1998–1999	LateLine	Victor 'Vic' Karp	17 episodes
1999	Will & Grace	Nathan Berry	Episode: "Saving Grace"
2000	3rd Rock from the Sun	Jack	Episode: "Youth Is Wasted on the Dick"
2001	Matisse & Picasso: A Gentle Rivalry	Pablo Picasso (voice)	Television short
2001–2007	Crossing Jordan	Dr. Garret Macy	117 episodes
2002	Night Visions	Dr. Dan Critchley	Episode: "Patterns"
2002	Shadow Realm	Dr. Daniel Critchley	Television film
2002	Sightings: Heartland Ghost	Allen	Television film
2003	L.A. County 187	Sgt. Walter Drazin	Television film
2003–2004	Jackie Chan Adventures	Tarakudo/Shadowkhan King (voice)	8 episodes
2006	Robot Chicken	Danny Ocean, Basher Tarr (voice)	Episode: "1987"
2007	American Dad!	Agent Hopkins (voice)	Episode: "American Dream Factory"
2007	El Tigre: The Adventures of Manny Rivera	El Tigre I (voice)	Episode: "The Grave Escape"
2007	Bionic Woman	Jonas Bledsoe	9 episodes
2007	The Batman	Sinestro (voice)	Episode: "Ring Toss"
2008	Medium	Joey, Teddy Carmichael	Episode: "Being Joey Carmichael"
2008	Law & Order: Criminal Intent	Gus Kovak	Episode: "Ten Count"
2009	CSI: Crime Scene Investigation	Defense Attorney Whitten	Episode: "Miscarriage of Justice"
2009	The Spectacular Spider-Man	Silvio Manfredi / Silvermane (voice)	2 episodes
2009	Kings	General Mallick	Episode: "Prosperity"
2009	Lie to Me	FBI ASAC Bill Steele	Episode: "Tractor Man"
2010	Psych	Fred Collins Boyd	Episode: "Think Tank"
2010	Edgar Floats	Bob	Pilot
2010–2013	Young Justice	Vandal Savage, Bibbo Bibbowski (voice)	11 episodes
2011	Ben 10: Ultimate Alien	Magister Hulka (voice)	Episode: "Basic Training"
2011	ThunderCats	Duelist (voice)	Episode: "The Duelist and the Drifter"
2011	The Protector	Lieutenant Felix Valdez	13 episodes
2011	Desperate Housewives	Andre Zeller	5 episodes
2011–2014	Adventure Time	Death, Grob Gob Glob Grod (voice)	4 episodes
2012	Applebaum	Detective Pepper Ferrer	Pilot
2012–2017	NCIS: Los Angeles	NCIS Assistant Director Owen Granger	115 episodes
2017	Twin Peaks	Albert Rosenfield	11 episodes Posthumous release Nominated – Saturn Award for Best Supporting Actor on Television
2017–2018	Stretch Armstrong and the Flex Fighters	Stretch Monster (voice)	10 episodes; posthumous release

=== Video games ===
Year	Title	Role	Notes
1998	Disney's Animated Storybook: Mulan	Shan Yu	
2004	Halo 2	Sesa 'Refumee	
2013	Adventure Time: Explore the Dungeon Because I Don't Know!	Death	

=== Music video ===
Year	Title	Artist
1986	"Pizza Face"	Barnes & Barnes
1995	"I Will Remember"	Toto
1997	"Sorry"	Nerf Herder

== See also ==
- List of Puerto Ricans
