= The Stranger Within (1990 film) =

- Genre: Thriller
- Written by: John Pielmeier
- Directed by: Tom Holland
- Starring: Rick Schroder; Kate Jackson; Chris Sarandon
- Music by: Vladimir Horunzhy
- Country of origin: United States
- Original language: English

Production
- Executive producer: Gary M. Goodman
- Producers: Barry Rosen; Paulette Breen
- Production locations: Carver County, Minnesota
- Cinematography: James Hayman
- Editor: Scott Conrad
- Running time: 100 minutes
- Production company: New World Television

Original release
- Network: CBS
- Release: November 27, 1990

The Stranger Within is a 1990 American made-for-television thriller film directed by Tom Holland and starring Rick Schroder, Kate Jackson and Chris Sarandon. It premiered on CBS on November 27, 1990.

== Plot ==
In October 1974 rural Grove's Mill, Minnesota, widow Mare Blackburn's (Kate Jackson) 3-year-old son Luke (Ross Swanson) is kidnapped by an unknown woman when Mare briefly relaxes her supervision of Luke in the small town's supermarket. Mare blames herself for the kidnapping and has difficulty processing the loss. Sixteen years later, Mare is now in a happy long-distance relationship with Dan (Chris Sarandon) – a California man who moved to Minneapolis after the suicide of his son - when a young man named Mark (Rick Schroder) shows up, claiming to be her son. Mare is reluctant to take him in, fearing that he is playing a cruel joke, until he shares memories from the past and shows a scar from a stove burn that matches with Luke's. He explains that he was raised in Idaho, and is now on a rest stop in Minnesota before returning to New York City to take a job. Mare is excited to catch up on sixteen years with her son, but Dan continues to doubt Mark's credibility.

One day, Mare takes Mark to the supermarket where the kidnapping took place, but faints. In the hospital, Mark finds out that Mare is pregnant and is surprised that she does not want him to tell Dan. Dan continues to seek evidence that will prove whether or not Mark is actually Luke, despite Mare's confession that she does not want to know whether Mark's story proves to be either true or false. At the police station, Dan finds out that the city in Idaho where Mark claims to have grown up - "Emerald City" - does not exist. Upset with Mark, Dan reluctantly saves his life when he almost falls off the roof. Mark then claims that Emerald City was a lie told to cover up his much worse past, and assures Dan of his credibility by showing him a birth mole that Luke also had. Shortly after, Mare rejects the latest of several marriage proposals from Dan, who has just found out through Mark about her pregnancy.

During an ice fishing trip, Dan confronts Mark yet again about the lies about his past. Feeling trapped, Mark pushes Dan into the water and lets him drown to death under the ice. Mark then returns to the house and cuts the phone wire and electricity cable, as well as disabling the motor in Mare's car, thus ensuring that Mare has no way to call for help and no other place to go. Mare is unaware of his responsibility in all these occurrences, though, and is further manipulated by Mark's claim that Dan fell in the water due to his fight with her over their marriage views. A visit from a police officer changes her views on Mark, upon finding out that he did not inform the officer about Dan's death. Mark turns the confrontation by insisting that she has been a horrible mother to him. The police officer, meanwhile, finds out that there are flaws to Mark's claims.

As both realize that Mark is a sociopathic killer, they unsuccessfully try to get away. Mark first nearly kills the officer with a hammer, and then turns to Mare. She attempts to throw him out, but he easily overpowers her; knocking her head through a mirror before handcuffing her. Later, he releases her and gives her another chance "to be a good mother", only to attack her when she claims to love him. When she admits that she is a bad mother, Mark responds that she should die for it. Mare, who does not believe that Mark is her own son anymore, attempts to shoot him to death with the policeman's pistol, but runs out of bullets. She is then pushed into the basement and awakes next to the police officer's nearly lifeless body. While Mark is distracted while digging a hole to bury the two, the officer manages to weakly move his arm enough to indicate his bullet-belt, and so, Mare retrieves the gun and reloads it. Mark, meanwhile, admits that he is not her son, before starting to bury her alive. He begins to taunt Mare, saying that she won't shoot him, and that while he may not be Mare's son, he's someone's. However, Mark's taunting words backfire on him, as to save her life, Mare ultimately shoots Mark. Mark survives the shooting and is about to kill her with a hammer, when suddenly, the police officer's father appears behind Mare and saves her by shooting Mark to death; Mark only has enough time to refer to Mare as "Mom" once more before dying. Mare awakes in the hospital with her mother by her side.

Whatever became of Luke, her real kidnapped son, is still left unresolved.

== Cast ==
- Rick Schroder as Mark
- Kate Jackson as Mare Blackburn
- Chris Sarandon as Dan
- Clark Sandford as Captain Bender
- Peter Breitmayer as Phil Bender
- Pamela Danser as Emma
- Ross Swanson as Luke Blackburn
- Dale Dunham as Milo
- Oliver Osterberg as Joe
- Kelsey Rose as Jill
- Zachary Hunke as Jason
- Suzanne Egli as Policewoman
- James Harris as Doctor
- Clarence Aune as Security Guard

== Reception ==
The New York Times called The Stranger Within "a frightening, well-done, made-for-TV thriller with a fine performance by Rick Schroder. [..] Schroder shows remarkable range in this change-of-pace performance where he plays an unsympathetic and unappealing character with great energy and intelligence. The Stranger Within is a fine, frightening psychological thriller."
