= The Langoliers (miniseries) =

- Title card from the first episode
- Genre: Horror; Mystery; Thriller
- Based on: "The Langoliers" by Stephen King
- Teleplay by: Tom Holland
- Directed by: Tom Holland
- Starring: Patricia Wettig; Dean Stockwell; David Morse; Mark Lindsay Chapman; Frankie Faison; Baxter Harris; Kimber Riddle; Christopher Collet; Kate Maberly; Bronson Pinchot
- Music by: Vladimir Horunzhy
- Country of origin: United States
- No. of episodes: 2

Production
- Running time: 180 minutes
- Production company: Laurel Entertainment

Original release
- Network: ABC
- Release: May 14 – May 15, 1995

The Langoliers is a horror miniseries about ten airline passengers who become accidental witnesses to the mysteries of time. It was directed and written by Tom Holland and based on the novella by Stephen King from the four-part anthology book Four Past Midnight. The series was produced by Mitchell Galin and David R. Kappes, for Laurel Entertainment, Inc. It originally aired May 14–15, 1995 on the ABC network in episodes of 1½ hours each.

== Plot ==
During a red-eye flight from Los Angeles to Boston, several passengers awaken to find that the rest have disappeared, leaving behind personal belongings and even surgical implants. Those remaining are pilot Brian Engle (deadheading on the flight), MI6 assassin Nick Hopewell, schoolteacher Laurel Stevenson, tool and die worker Don Gaffney, violinist Albert Kaussner, troubled teen Bethany Sims, mystery author Bob Jenkins, blind girl Dinah Bellman, sleepy businessman Rudy Warwick, and Type A bond trader Craig Toomy.

Brian and Nick find the cockpit empty and Brian takes the controls. Craig demands an explanation and then has a psychotic episode that enables Dinah, a telepath, to enter his thoughts. After failing to establish communication with either air traffic control or other flights, Brian redirects the flight from Boston to Bangor, Maine, angering Craig, who insists he must attend an important business meeting. The group finds the airport deserted and without power. They soon discover that everything around them is dull and lifeless, with matches failing to light, sounds lacking echo, and food having no taste. Dinah reports hearing a strange crackling sound in the distance, while Bob deduces that the plane passed through a time rip, sending them to a past moment empty of people and energy. Craig’s mental state continues to worsen, and he begins experiencing hallucinations of his abusive father. He finds a gun in an airport locker and takes Bethany hostage. Albert counterattacks and is shot, but the bullet falls harmlessly to the ground. Nick ties Craig's arms and says that they must find a way to leave before the source of the noise arrives. While restrained, Craig tells Dinah that his father warned him about the Langoliers, monsters that chase and eat lazy children.

Albert discovers that "present time" is still on the plane, and objects brought from the airport regain normal behavior after a short time on board. He reasons that if they refuel the plane, the jet fuel will regain potency. Craig escapes his restraints and stabs Dinah and Don, killing the latter, before Albert knocks him unconscious. Dinah receives first aid and is brought onto the plane, telling Nick that Craig must not be killed. Brian refuels the plane and Dinah creates a vision of Craig's meeting in Boston to lure him to the tarmac, where he proudly and insanely admits losing millions on junk bonds. The origin of the noise is finally revealed when saw-toothed monsters appear, devouring everything in sight. Craig recognizes them as the Langoliers and flees in terror, drawing them away from the plane, until they catch up and eat him. The other passengers board and the plane takes off while the Langoliers consume every trace of the past.

Dinah succumbs to her wound on the plane. As the flight approaches the time rip, Bob realizes that they cannot go through it while conscious. Brian can lower the cabin pressure to put them to sleep, but someone must restore pressure at the last moment. Nick, seeing an opportunity for redemption, volunteers to do so and vanishes as the plane passes through the rip. Brian awakens shortly after to land the plane in Los Angeles. Upon landing, the passengers find that the airport is vibrant but again empty. They conclude that they have arrived a few minutes into the future and wait for other people to blur into view, then take a joyful walk outside.

== Cast ==
- Patricia Wettig as Laurel Stevenson, a school teacher who uncharacteristically answered a personal ad to meet a man in Boston.
- Dean Stockwell as Bob Jenkins, a mystery writer with a strong ability for deduction. He manages to piece together the situation and provides many outrageous theories which come true for the most part, sometimes with his sidekick Albert's help.
- David Morse as Captain Brian Engle, an airline pilot on his way to Boston after hearing his ex-wife had died in a fire. He is qualified to fly the plane and is able to take off and land it safely.
- Mark Lindsay Chapman as Nick Hopewell, a British secret agent and hitman going to Boston for a final mission. He is tough, quick, yet compassionate for the other passengers with the exception of Toomy.
- Frankie Faison as Don Gaffney, a military aircraft tool-and-die worker on his way to Boston to meet his first granddaughter.
- Baxter Harris as Rudy Warwick, a businessman whose insatiable appetite and sleepiness helps Bob deduce situations on more than one occasion.
- Kimber Riddle as Bethany Simms, a rebellious teenager on her way to Worcester, Massachusetts, to stay with her aunt, though she is convinced she'll be spending the entire time in drug rehab.
- Christopher Collet as Albert "Ace" Kaussner, a violinist on his way to attend a music school in Boston. He becomes the "Watson" to Bob Jenkins.
- Kate Maberly as Dinah Catherine Bellman, a blind girl on her way to Boston to have a surgery to help restore her eyesight. She has strange psychic powers and is able to see and communicate with Toomy telepathically. She is strong-willed and seems to know a lot more of what's going on than anyone else.
- Bronson Pinchot as Craig Toomy, a bond trader working for an unnamed large company, who is psychologically unsound because, as a child, he was abused by his domineering father.
  - Christopher Cooke as 9-year-old Craig.
- John Griesemer as Roger Toomy, Craig's cruel, bad-tempered father whose memory haunts him.
- Stephen King in a cameo as Tom Holby, Craig Toomy's boss, to whom Toomy reveals, in his final hallucination, that he deliberately lost $43 million on junk bonds.
- Tom Holland also in a cameo as Harker, Nick's mission handler.

=== Casting ===
On her role of Laurel, Patricia Wettig thought she was moving away from roles which had stereotyped her with "sensitive listener roles", although conceded that she "should probably resign myself to it".

Kate Maberly secured the role after an unexpected call requesting her to attend an audition in New York with a day's notice while she was in England. She was taught to act blind and use a cane by Sue Martin, herself registered as legally blind.

The cast plus extras exceeded 150 people.

== Production ==
Richard P. Rubinstein through his company Laurel Entertainment optioned the Stephen King story The Langoliers Four Past Midnight in 1992. Rubinstein felt the story would make for a good "popcorn movie", as unlike his previous King production, The Stand, which dealt with very heavy themes, he felt this was more like King's take on Ten Little Indians by way of an Irwin Allen disaster film. Rubinstein had become acquainted with Tom Holland while working on the adaptation of King's Thinner years earlier which had stalled in development at Warner Bros., and while they waited for Thinner to get out of development hell both King and Rubinstein thought Holland would be a good choice to direct as King had liked Holland's prior films Fright Night and Child's Play. Unlike, The Stand, where King checked in on a day to day basis and was on the set 25% of the time, King only provided feedback on the initial drafts of the screenplay and watched the first ten days worth of dailies, and outside of some conversations with Holland, was considerably more hands off.

=== Pre-production ===
For scenes on the plane, the production team acquired a retired Lockheed L-1011 TriStar aircraft from Japan, which was cut up into several pieces and transported to set, where it was re-assembled to appear intact. At the time, there was no other similar mock-up anywhere else in the country, which allowed the possibility of being rented for other purposes post-production. The cockpit was removed and attached to a hydraulic apparatus, which could be manoeuvred in a manner to simulate wind turbulence.

=== Filming ===
The miniseries was filmed almost entirely in and around the Bangor International Airport in Bangor, Maine (author King's hometown) during the summer of 1994. Producer David Kappes noted that the crew considered using an airport in Pittsburgh and a newly opened one in Denver, both of which were closed and therefore suitable for filming, but decided against them because they wanted to bring reality to the story and film in the airport where the novel takes place. The film crew used a Cold War–era bomber hangar, which was considered convenient for the cast and crew, but suffered issues with noise and heat, necessitating a large air conditioning unit. A second L-1011 airliner, which had been retired from Trans World Airlines and rescued for filming purposes, was used for takeoff and landing shots.

Filming days lasted between 12 and 15 hours, with actors typically working six days a week. Final scenes were shot in a functional waiting area within the airport.

Real passengers were able to observe rehearsals, although numerous close encounters between actors and tourists were reported. Jet noise from aircraft required a considerable budget to re-record voices and over-loop in post-production.

=== Post-production ===
Filming wrapped in September 1994, around two months after production began. The cost to produce the miniseries according to Charles Miller, production manager, was estimated in the region of $3 million to $5 million, although costs were kept lower due to the compact location of the airport and set. The cast and crew stayed in the Bangor Airport Marriott Hotel, filling 40 rooms. The numbers of cast and crew exceeded 130, as well as roughly 175 extras, who all lived locally.

=== Creature design and effects ===
The effects for The Langoliers were provided by New York-based computer effects studio Image Design, who had previously provided the effects work for Rubinstein's production of The Stand. As King had been very vocal in his criticism for the monster reveal in the 1990 It miniseries, Rubinstein worked closely with King to ensure they would avoid a repeat of the experience, and that King would be satisfied with the reveal of the Langoliers. Building upon King's general description of the Langoliers as "Beach balls with teeth", Rubinstein went back and forth with the effects department to decide whether the Langoliers should be practical effects or CGI, before ultimately deciding to go with CGI as Rubinstein felt it would strike that balance of being from a childhood nightmare, scary while also being slightly cartoony. Special effects supervisor Tom Barham directed his team to build various computer models for the titular Langoliers based on the vague description provided in the source material. Initially, the team tried to give the Langoliers faces, but according to Barham, anytime they attempted this, the models ended up looking too much like Pac-Man, which both King and Holland said would not be acceptable. In order to achieve something that fell within King and Holland's vision, the team divided up the Langoliers' forms into sections and gave them rows of metallic shark-like teeth to make them "whirling balls of death and destruction". All scenes involving the plane in flight, with the exception of takeoff and landing sequences, were achieved with CGI.

== Reception and legacy ==
On the review aggregator website Rotten Tomatoes, 50% of 22 critics' reviews are positive, with an average rating of 5.1/10. The website's consensus reads: "While not without its fair share of thrills, The Langoliers suffers from a meandering pace and dubious characterizations." Metacritic, which uses a weighted average, assigned the film a score of 59 out of 100, based on 15 critics, indicating "mixed or average" reviews.

Ken Tucker of Entertainment Weekly gave it a "B" rating, calling it "an episode of The Twilight Zone stretched out to four hours, [which] nonetheless does have its moments." TV Guide gave it one out of five stars, calling it tedious and boring, criticizing its "dull" script, "cardboard characters", "ludicrous special effects", and its "dishwatery cast, [with the sole exception of] Pinchot, who rolls his eyes like an alien thespian from the Planet Ham". Variety found the first three hours of the series work well, but that it falls apart when the monster is revealed. The book Stephen King Films FAQ asserted that Bronson Pinchot "chews more scenery than all of the Langoliers put together".

The series did very well for ABC, finishing among the top five in the weekly ratings.

In 2021, Greek experimental filmmaker Aristotelis Maragkos reanimated the TV movie into an experimental feature titled The Timekeepers of Eternity.

== See also ==
- A Matter of Minutes (The Twilight Zone, 1985)
- Into the Night (TV series)
- The Flight That Disappeared (1961 film)
- The Odyssey of Flight 33 (The Twilight Zone, 1959)
- The Premonition (The Outer Limits, 1965)
