= Golden Years (miniseries) =

- Title card
- Also known as: Stephen King's Golden Years
- Genre: Science fiction; Thriller
- Created by: Stephen King
- Developed by: Josef Anderson
- Written by: Stephen King; Josef Anderson
- Directed by: Kenneth Fink (1); Allen Coulter (2, 4, 6); Michael Gornick (3, 7); Stephen Tolkin (5)
- Starring: Keith Szarabajka; Felicity Huffman; Frances Sternhagen; Ed Lauter; R. D. Call; Bill Raymond
- Theme music composer: David Bowie
- Opening theme: "Golden Years"
- Ending theme: "If You Won't Leave Me, I'll Find Somebody Who Will"
- Composer: Joe Taylor
- Country of origin: United States
- Original language: English
- No. of seasons: 1
- No. of episodes: 7

Production
- Executive producers: Stephen King; Richard P. Rubinstein
- Producers: Mitchell Galin; Peter R. McIntosh
- Cinematography: Alex Nepomniaschy
- Editors: Michael Kewley; Stephen Mark; Richard Harkness
- Camera setup: Joe D'Alessandro
- Running time: 232 minutes; 236 minutes (Home video)
- Production company: Laurel Productions

Original release
- Network: CBS
- Release: July 16 – August 22, 1991

Golden Years (also referred to as Stephen King's Golden Years) is an American television science fiction thriller miniseries that aired in seven parts on CBS from July 16 to August 22, 1991 as a part of its 1991 schedule.

== Plot ==
Harlan Williams, an elderly janitor, is caught up in an explosion at the top-secret laboratory where he works. After surviving but discovering he is now "aging" in reverse, he ends up on the run from an operative of "The Shop".

== Cast ==
All episodes

- Keith Szarabajka as Harlan Williams
- Felicity Huffman as Terry Spann
- Frances Sternhagen as Gina Williams
- Ed Lauter as Gen. Louis Crewes
- R. D. Call as Jude Andrews
- Bill Raymond as Dr. Richard X. Toddhunter

Six or fewer appearances

- Stephen Root as Maj. Moreland
- Philip Lenkowsky as Billy Delois
- Tim Guinee as Fredericks
- Graham Paul as Rick Haverford
- Erik King as Burton
- John Rothman as Dr. Ackerman
- Harriet Sansom Harris as Francie Williams
- Matt Malloy as Redding
- Margo Martindale as Thelma
- Stephen King (cameo/episode 5) as a bus driver

== Production ==
King called Golden Years a "novel for television"; it originated as an idea for a novel that sat in his notebook for years. He "wrote the first five episodes and outlined the last two." King credited Twin Peaks for making it possible for Golden Years to be produced:

"Up until Twin Peaks came on, the only sort of continuing drama that TV understood was soap opera, Dallas, Knots Landing, that sort of thing. To some degree David Lynch gave them that. But he turned the whole idea of that continuing soap opera inside out like a sock. If you think of Twin Peaks as a man, it's a man in delirium, a man spouting stream-of-consciousness stuff. Golden Years is like Twin Peaks without the delirium."

The miniseries was intended to lead into a regular series, and therefore ended on a cliffhanger. CBS, however, decided not to pick up the option on the full series, and it was never realized. King asked for four hours of airtime in the following spring to finish the story, but CBS denied him this as well. The home video version changes the last few minutes of the final episode to give the story an optimistic ending.

== Reception ==
The miniseries received mixed reviews from critics. On Rotten Tomatoes, it holds a rating of 53% from 36 reviews with the consensus: "Golden Years drifts between dull execution and flashes of character-driven charm, with a strong cast and moments of intrigue undermined by slow pacing, pedestrian direction, and a lack of Stephen King's usual thrills."
