= Thinner (film) =

1996 American horror film

- U.S. theatrical release poster
- Directed by: Tom Holland
- Screenplay by: Michael McDowell; Tom Holland
- Based on: Thinner by Richard Bachman (Note: The novel was written by Stephen King, who published it under the pen name "Richard Bachman".)
- Produced by: Mitchell Galin; Richard P. Rubinstein
- Starring: Robert John Burke; Joe Mantegna
- Cinematography: Kees Van Oostrum
- Edited by: Marc Laub
- Music by: Daniel Licht
- Production companies: Spelling Films; Laurel Productions
- Distributed by: Paramount Pictures (United States and Canada); Spelling Films International (International)
- Release date: October 25, 1996
- Running time: 92 minutes
- Country: United States
- Language: English
- Budget: $8-17 million
- Box office: $15.3 million (domestic)

Thinner (marketed as Stephen King's Thinner) is a 1996 American body horror film directed by Tom Holland and written by Michael McDowell and Holland. The film is based on Stephen King's 1984 novel of the same name (which he wrote under the pseudonym Richard Bachman) and stars Robert John Burke and Joe Mantegna. In the film, an obese lawyer who accidentally kills a Romani woman is cursed by the woman's father to rapidly lose weight.

Thinner was released in the United States on October 25, 1996, by Paramount Pictures. It received mostly negative reviews and grossed $15.3 million against a budget of $8 million.

Producer Mitchell Gallin regarded the script as the best he had ever worked with, but thought the final film did not do it justice.

== Plot ==
Billy Halleck is an obese upper class lawyer who lives with his wife Heidi and their daughter Linda in Connecticut. He recently defended Mafia boss Richie "The Hammer" Ginelli in court and is now celebrating his acquittal on a murder charge. Heidi, trying to persuade him to forget about his obsession with food, tries to give Billy oral sex as he is driving. Distracted, Billy accidentally runs over an elderly Romani woman named Suzanne Lempke, killing her. He is tried and acquitted of manslaughter by his friend Judge Cary Rossington after getting police chief Duncan Hopley to commit perjury.

Outraged by the injustice, Suzanne's father, Tadzu Lempke, places a curse on Billy on the steps of the courthouse by touching his face and uttering "thinner". Soon afterward, Billy begins to lose weight rapidly despite not exercising or sticking to his diet. Heidi, fearing the weight loss may be due to cancer, calls Dr. Mike Houston, with whom Billy begins to suspect his wife is having an affair. Billy eats even more fervently so he does not starve. Billy learns that Rossington and Hopley have also been cursed; Rossington is now a hideous lizard-like being, while Hopley develops purulent ulcers on his face and hands. Both men ultimately die by suicide. Billy tracks down the Romani camp and tries to reason with Tadzu; Tadzu refuses to help and banishes him from the camp. Gina, Tadzu's granddaughter, uses her slingshot to fire a large ball bearing through Billy's hand, infuriating him into vowing revenge against the Romani.

Billy enlists Ginelli to attack the Romani camp and persuade Tadzu to lift the curse. Ginelli poisons the Romani's dogs before kidnapping Gina's husband and using him as a decoy, thus tricking the Romani into killing him. Ginelli impersonates an FBI agent and kidnaps and threatens Gina. To spare his family from Ginelli's onslaught, Tadzu finally agrees to meet with Billy. Chanting a spell, Tadzu mixes Billy's blood into a strawberry pie. He states that if someone else eats the pie, the curse will kill them quickly and Billy will be spared. He urges Billy to eat the pie himself and die with dignity, but Billy refuses. Billy arrives home and gives Heidi the pie, which she eats. The next morning, Billy finds her desiccated corpse next to him. He is gleeful to be free of the curse and of what he believes is his disloyal wife. However, when he goes downstairs, he discovers that his daughter has eaten some of the pie for breakfast. Wracked with guilt, he prepares to eat the rest, only to be interrupted by Mike at the door. Mike grows uncomfortable and struggles to explain his unannounced presence, seemingly confirming Billy's suspicions of an affair. Billy invites Mike in for some pie and closes the door with a smile.

== Cast ==
- Robert John Burke as Billy Halleck
- Joe Mantegna as Richie "The Hammer" Ginelli
- Lucinda Jenney as Heidi Halleck
- Michael Constantine as Tadzu Lempke
- Kari Wuhrer as Gina Lempke Romani
- Bethany Joy Lenz as Linda Halleck
- Daniel von Bargen as Chief Duncan Hopley
- John Horton as Judge Cary Rossington
- Howard Erskine as Judge Phillips
- Terence Kava as Gabe Romani
- Irma St. Paule as Suzanne Lempke
- Elizabeth Franz as Leda Rossington
- Stephen King as Dr. Jonathan Bangor
- Sam Freed as Dr. Mike Houston
- Antonette Schwartzberg as Mama Ginelli
- Sean Hewitt as Dr. Fander
- Josh Holland as Frank Spurton
- Peter Maloney as Biff Quigley
- Ed Wheeler as Detective Deevers
- Kenneth Londoner as Andrew Richards
- Robert Fitch]as 'Flash' Enders
- Patrick Farrelly as Henry Halliwell
- Walter Bobbie as Kirk Penschley
- Jeff Ware as Max Duggenfield
- Time Winters as Prosecutor

== Production ==
The rights to Stephen King's novel Thinner, written under King's pen name Richard Bachman, were acquired by producer Richard P. Rubinstein in 1988 and initially set up at Warner Bros. Pictures. Tom Holland was hired to direct the following year as King was a fan of Holland's prior films such as Child's Play. According to Rubinstein, the reason Thinner took so long to get formally greenlit was due to ever changing reasons by the studio. In some cases the studio wouldn't approve the budget or were unconvinced the production could create convincing effects, and another instance was because the studio feared Halleck's rapid weight loss would be seen as too similar to the ongoing AIDS epidemic. Due to the ongoing delays in production, Rubinstein, Holland, and King were able to work on The Langoliers in the interim between Thinner being greenlit following turnaround from Warner Bros. to Paramount Pictures.

In order to accurately depict Halleck's obesity, makeup effects artist Greg Cannom created a number of fatsuits for actor Robert John Burke with matching latex pieces for his face and hands. For the shower scene where Halleck's chest is exposed, a fatsuit was rigged with silicone breast implants. Additional prosthetic makeup was also created to depict the curses inflicted on the judge and the police chief, and a dummy was fashioned to portray Halleck's wife dying after eating the pie. The film's effects won it the Saturn Award for Best Makeup.

== Critical reception ==
Thinner received mostly negative reviews from critics. The film holds an approval rating of 19% on Rotten Tomatoes based on 27 reviews, with an average rating of 3.7/10. The critical consensus reads: "A bland, weightless horror film that seems to want to mock itself as the proceedings drag on." On Metacritic, the film has a weighted average score of 33 out of 100 based on 14 critic reviews, indicating "generally unfavorable reviews".

James Berardinelli gave the film two stars out of four, writing: "Thinner could have been an opportunity to examine the ethics of a slick lawyer who refuses to accept responsibility for his actions. [...] Unfortunately, questions of morality are of secondary importance to a film that emphasizes its Death Wish aspects." Owen Gleiberman of Entertainment Weekly gave the film a "D" rating, writing: "Like too many Stephen King movies, Thinner is all (emaciated) concept and no follow-through." The Austin Chronicle's Marc Savlov gave the film a rating of one out of five stars, writing that, "Apart from its rushed pacing and occasionally stale dialogue, Thinner suffers even more from the fact that it has no redeemable characters."

Variety's Leonard Klady referred to the film as a "banally scripted and directed effort", as well as "one of the more pedestrian translations of the shockmeister's books". A more positive review came from Mick LaSalle of the San Francisco Chronicle, who called Thinner "one of the better Stephen King-derived movies." Lawrence Van Gelder of The New York Times, in his review of the film, wrote: "The production is slick, the Maine scenery is bracing, the characters are well-acted, and in a mumbo-jumbo movie with a few loose ends, the makeup central to the plot and applied by Greg Cannom and Bob Laden to Robert John Burke in the leading role is most admirable."

In a retrospective review, Nathan Rabin of The A.V. Club gave the film a "D−", writing that "Thinner's problems begin with a grotesquely unconvincing fat suit and makeup", and that Burke's "cartoonish performance matches the tone of a film that's broadly comic and often just plain broad without containing much in the way of jokes, let alone genuine wit or suspense."
