= The Amulet (novel) =

1979 horror novel by Michael McDowell

- First edition cover
- Author: Michael McDowell
- Language: English
- Genre: Southern Gothic; Horror fiction
- Published: 1979
- Publication place: United States
- Media type: Paperback; E-book

The Amulet is a Southern Gothic horror novel, originally published in 1979 by Michael McDowell. The book was first published in paperback by Avon Books.

== Plot ==
In 1965, Dean Howell is disfigured and left in a vegetative stage after a shooting accident while training in the army. His wife Sarah and mother Jo bring him home to care for him. Jo blames many of the residents of their small town of Pinecone, Alabama, starting with the rifle's manufacturers, who are the largest company in the area. Sarah is tasked with Dean's care and is told that he is unable to speak or otherwise respond to outward stimuli, leaving her with the fear that he may be brain damaged. During a visit by an old friend, Jo gifts him an amulet that she claims her son wanted him to have.

That evening the friend's family is killed in a house fire. The amulet is discovered among the smoldering ruins of the house by the sheriff's daughter who brings the amulet home and gives it to her mother. That night, the mother kills her husband with an ice pick and accidentally cuts her own throat. During all of this Jo claims that she is able to speak to Dean and Sarah begins to detect malevolence coming from Dean, who is entirely bandaged and outwardly shows no signs of communication or acknowledgement.

The amulet then makes its way through those who Jo accuses of responsibility for Dean's accident. Sarah is the only one who sees what might be the cause of these accidents, and along with her close friend Becca, the two set out to find the amulet before any more lives are ruined by its curse. Sarah is ultimately unsuccessful in preventing the amulet from causing more death, as the cursed amulet ends up in the possession of Becca and her daughter, causing their deaths. This proves to be the last straw for Sarah. She had been tolerating abuse from Dean prior to him leaving for training and had been the recipient of his mother's wrath throughout their relationship, with the accident bring it to a fever pitch. The book ends with Sarah poisoning Dean's food with lye, before confronting Jo. While she tells the woman that the amulet was destroyed, it is implied that Sarah is wearing the necklace and willingly put it on so she could kill her tormentors.

== Overview ==
McDowell moved to Boston, Massachusetts in 1968, to attend Harvard and, planned on becoming an English teacher. He continued writing at night. After dropping out of Brandeis's PhD program when he realized he didn't want to teach, McDowell found work as a secretary while writing on the side. He ended up writing six novels, all of which were rejected by publishers.

Then in 1977, he went to go see Stanley Kubrick's Barry Lyndon, where he saw a trailer for The Omen and began to fixate on the main character's name. "I thought, "well, isn't it convenient that these possessed children have such diabolical names? What if you had a possessed child called Fred?" McDowell began writing a screenplay with this idea, which he later adapted into a novel, assuming that anyone who produced the film would want to have a novelization to go along with the film.

"Before I started, I knew that I was going to have a sequence of deaths, and that the amulet would pass from one to another. Beyond that, I didn't know what I was going to do, so a friend and I sat down one evening and thought: 'How can you kill people with things around the house?' We came up with an ice pick in the ear, and throwing a baby into a washing machine, and decapitation by a ceiling fan and so on. So I wrote those down and then I figured out ways to connect them."

Avon Books was the first publisher to see the manuscript and they bought it, signing McDowell to a two-book contract. This deal allowed McDowell to quit his secretarial job and focus on writing full time.

In an interview with Douglas Winter in his book Faces of Fear, McDowell said, "I like being published in paperback. That's important to me."

== Reception ==
The Amulet was well received. The Los Angeles Review of Books said of it, "The Amulet is an impressive debut. It shows McDowell's prowess for sharp dialogue, which minds the natural and regional (if not always strictly individual) cadences and humor of his characters."

The Washington Post said, "McDowell has a flair for the gruesome." Grady Hendrix praised McDowell's writing and storytelling skill, saying, "The book ends with a supernatural melt-down that's an orgy of gore but if that was all there was to The Amulet this would be little more than a forgettable Final Destination fiesta. But McDowell has written a book that feels, deeply, like Alabama in the Sixties. This is a Southern book that captures mid-century small town living in a way few books do."

The book was republished by Valancourt Books in 2013, with a new introduction by Poppy Z. Brite, who called McDowell, "One of the genre’s most underrated writers...enjoyably nasty."
