= Mitchell Galin =

American film and television producer

Mitchell Galin is an American film and television producer. He is best known for his work on Stephen King's The Stand for ABC and Frank Herbert's Dune for Syfy. In 2009, he co-founded the production company Epiphany Pictures.

== Selected filmography ==
- Tales from the Darkside (1985)
- Creepshow 2 (1987)
- Pet Sematary (1989)
- Tales from the Darkside: The Movie (1990)
- Golden Years (1991)
- Stephen King's The Stand (1994)
- The Langoliers (1995)
- Thinner (1996)
- Frank Herbert's Dune (2000)
- Apostles of Comedy (2008)
- Journey to Everest (2010)
- Honoring a Father's Dream: Sons of Lwala (2011)
- The Shunning (2011)
- Apostles of Comedy: Onwards and Upwards (2013)
- Norman Rockwell's Shuffleton Barbershop (2013)
- Living Hope (2014)
