= List of Tales from the Darkside episodes =

This is an episode list for the 1980s anthology series Tales from the Darkside.

== Series overview ==
Season	Episodes	Originally released	
Season	Episodes	First released	Last released
Pilot		October 29, 1983	
1	23	September 30, 1984	August 4, 1985
2	24	September 29, 1985	July 13, 1986
3	22	September 28, 1986	May 17, 1987
4	20	September 27, 1987	July 24, 1988

== Episodes ==
=== Pilot (1983) ===
Title	Directed by	Written by	Original release date
"Trick or Treat"	Bob Balaban	George A. Romero	October 29, 1983
Gideon Hackles (Barnard Hughes), a rich and spiteful old man who holds an obsession for documenting and exploiting debts owed to him, annually offers trick-or-treaters the chance to search his house on Halloween night for their parents' IOUs, only to terrify them with animatronic "ghosts". Over the course of the night, Mr. Hackles finds himself terrified by a real witch and genuine monsters and demons. Guest-starring Max Wright.

=== Season 1 (1984–1985) ===
No. overall	No. in season	Title	Directed by	Written by	Original release date
1	1	"The New Man"	Frank De Palma	Based on a short story by : Barbara Owens adapted by : Mark Durand	September 30, 1984
Alan Coombs (Vic Tayback), a bad-tempered recovering alcoholic, meets Jerry (Chris Herbert), a young boy who claims to be his son. Coombs insists that he has never seen or met Jerry before, but Jerry and Coombs' own family say otherwise, eventually driving Coombs to madness.
2	2	"I'll Give You a Million"	John Harrison	Mark Durand and David Spiel	October 7, 1984
Millionaire Duncan Williams (Keenan Wynn) offers his longtime acquaintance Jack Blaine (George Petrie) $1,000,000 to buy his soul. When Jack ends up dying shortly after, Duncan races to claim his soul, but faces a troubling complication when another party becomes interested in it as well.
3	3	"Pain Killer"	Armand Mastroianni	Haskell Barkin	October 14, 1984
Henpecked husband Harvey Turman (Lou Jacobi), who happens to suffer from excruciating back pain, visits his doctor (Farley Granger) for a cure. The doctor diagnoses that Harvey's nagging wife Nadine (Peggy Cass) is the cause of his pain, and the only way that his backaches will cease is if he eliminates her.
4	4	"The Odds"	James Sadwith	James Sadwith	October 21, 1984
Tommy Vale (Danny Aiello), a bookie who never turns down a bet, meets Bill Lacey (Tom Noonan), a mysterious bettor who manages to successfully predict outcomes on every gamble he makes, and becomes determined to break Tommy at any cost. When Tommy ends up wagering on the time of his death, he must do everything he can to outsmart a man who has never lost.
5	5	"Mookie and Pookie"	Timna Ranon	Dan Kleinman	November 4, 1984
Susan "Pookie" Anderson (Justine Bateman) discovers that the spirit of her recently deceased twin brother, Kevin "Mookie" Anderson (Ron Asher), lives on through his computer, but her parents don't believe her. When her father threatens to sell the computer due to her growing obsession with it, Susan must prove to her parents that her brother is still alive before they follow through on their promise. Guest-starring Tippi Hedren,
6	6	"Slippage"	Michael Gornick	Based on a short story by : Michael Kube-McDowell adapted by : Mark Durand	November 11, 1984
Graphic designer Richard Hall (David Patrick Kelly) discovers that he has been turned down for a promotion, hasn't received an invitation to his high school reunion, and that his own mother has failed to recognize him. Putting everything together, Richard determines that the source of the problem is that he is mysteriously being erased from existence.
7	7	"Inside the Closet"	Tom Savini	Michael McDowell	November 21, 1984
Graduate student Gail Aynsley (Roberta Weiss) takes up a room for rent in the house of Dr. Fenner (Fritz Weaver), the dean of a local veterinary school. She discovers that her new room has a strange miniature door inside it, and estimates that there may be something lurking on the other side.
8	8	"The Word Processor of the Gods"	Michael Gornick	Based on the 1983 short story by : Stephen King adapted by : Michael McDowell	November 25, 1984
Richard Hagstrom (Bruce Davison), a struggling novelist married to a shrewish wife and father to an ungrateful son, discovers that his new word processor, a gift from his deceased nephew Johnathan, is more powerful than he could ever have imagined: every sentence he types into it alters reality.
9	9	"A Case of the Stubborns"	Jerry Smith	Written by : James Houghton; Based on a short story by : Robert Bloch	December 2, 1984
Jody Tolliver (Christian Slater) and his mother mourn the death of Grandpa Titus (Eddie Bracken). The next morning Titus rises and carries on as if nothing happened. Jody and his mother enlist several townsfolk to help convince the stubborn man that he is dead. Guest-starring Brent Spiner as Reverend Peabody.
10	10	"Djinn, No Chaser"	Shelley Levinson	Based on a story by : Harlan Ellison adapted by : Haskell Barkin	January 13, 1985
Newlyweds Danny and Connie Squires (Charles Levin and Colleen Camp) purchase a lamp which turns out to hold a genie (Kareem Abdul-Jabbar). Extremely angered at being trapped for 10,000 years, the genie lashes out at his new masters, torturing them with various plagues. Fortunately, Connie offers a simple solution to the genie's problem.
11	11	"All a Clone by the Telephone"	Frank De Palma	Haskell Barkin	January 20, 1985
Meek, struggling screenwriter Leon (Harry Anderson) is contacted by his answering machine, which happens to come from an alternate universe. Making it known how intensely strong-willed it is, the machine, speaking in Leon's voice, gradually begins to take over the original Leon's life. Eventually, Leon lashes out at the machine and shuts it off, but this ends up sending the machine's "friends" after him; automated recordings torturing him non-stop with useless information.
12	12	"In the Cards"	Ted Gershuny	Ted Gershuny	January 27, 1985
Catherine (Dorothy Lyman) is a false tarot reader who attracts business by only giving out good predictions. One day, she soon finds herself stuck with a new deck of tarot cards, and this new deck is cursed to make terrible predictions come true, with Catherine forced to peer into these horrific futures against her will.
13	13	"Anniversary Dinner"	John Strysik	Story by : Harlan Ellison adapted by : James Houghton	February 3, 1985
Elderly couple Henry and Elinor Colander (Mario Roccuzzo and Alice Ghostley) take in Sybil (Fredrica Duke), a drifter escaping from her boyfriend, just in time for their 25th wedding anniversary. Unfortunately for Sybil, the couple plan on serving a very revolting dish for the occasion.
14	14	"Snip, Snip"	Terence Cahalan	Howard Smith and Tom Allan	February 10, 1985
Abe North (Bud Cort), a put-upon math professor who studies the dark arts, quits his job, confident that his magic is about to help him win the lottery. Unfortunately, Abe finds out that he has lost by one number to hairdresser Anne MacColl (Carol Kane). When he comes to confront her, Abe discovers that she too studies the dark arts... and that she is more skilled, bitter, and unhinged than he is.
15	15	"Answer Me"	Richard Friedman	Michael McDowell	February 17, 1985
Joan Matlin (Jean Marsh), an aspiring actress who has moved to New York in the hopes of finding work, is driven to near insanity by a telephone in the next apartment that rings constantly. She attempts to complain to the tenants inside, but finds that the apartment has been vacant for some time. She tries to have the phone disconnected, but it is gradually revealed that the phone has a life of its own.
16	16	"The Tear Collector"	John Drimmer	Geoffrey Loftus and John Drimmer	February 24, 1985
Prudence (Jessica Harper), a young woman who suffers from clinical depression, meets Ambrose Cavender (Victor Garber), a peculiar therapist who collects the tears of his patients, insisting they are for a purpose. It isn't long before Prudence wonders if Cavender is merely pretending to help her and is actually exploiting her constant crying fits to gather more tears.
17	17	"Madness Room"	John Hayes	Thomas Epperson	May 5, 1985
Cathy and Edward Osbourne (Therese Pare and Stuart Whitman), along with their attorney Michael Fox (Nick Benedict), discover through communication with a spirit known as Ben that their house contains a boarded up room that causes anyone that steps inside it to go insane. Cathy and Michael, who are lovers, plot to scare Edward to death in the supposedly cursed "Madness Room" so they can abscond with his fortune.
18	18	"If the Shoes Fit..."	Armand Mastroianni	Armand Mastroianni and David Gerrold	May 12, 1985
Smarmy politician Bo Gumbs (Dick Shawn) checks into a hotel to prepare for a speech. After he tells the hotel waitstaff his philosophy that politics is solely about entertaining people, they help him to get ready by dressing him up as the clown that he truly is.
19	19	"Levitation"	John Harrison	Based on a short story by : Joseph Payne Brennan adapted by : David Gerrold	May 19, 1985
College student Frank (Brad Cowgill), accompanied by his friend Ernie (Anthony Thompkins), goads The Great Kharma (Joe Turkel), a once-famous magician, into performing his greatest feat: wireless levitation. When Kharma relents and finally manages to perform the trick on Frank, the results are disastrous.
20	20	"It All Comes Out in the Wash"	Frank De Palma	Harvey Jacobs	May 26, 1985
Real estate developer Carl Gropper (Vince Edwards) discovers that laundromat owner Chow Ting (James Hong) is purportedly able to wash away the sin of his clients. With this in mind, Carl pays Ting for his special service, then goes onto engage in various increasingly mean-spirited actions to move up in the world, believing that his guilt will be washed away.
21	21	"Bigalow's Last Smoke"	Timna Ranon	Michael McDowell	June 9, 1985
Chain smoker Frank Bigalow (Richard Romanus) wakes up in a replica of his apartment outfitted with alarms and bars on the windows. He is overseen by Dr. Synapsis (Sam Anderson), an addiction counselor, who tells Frank that he will only be allowed to leave his prison if he quits smoking of his own accord.
22	22	"Grandma's Last Wish"	Warner Shook	Jule Selbo	June 16, 1985
The doddering and slightly senile Grandma Rollins (Jane Connell) is treated as a burden by her self-centered, unsympathetic family, who plan to throw her in a nursing home against her will. When she is told to make a wish the week before she leaves, her family grows to understand, quite literally, the hardships that come with old age.
23	23	"The False Prophet"	Jerry Cotts	Jule Selbo	August 4, 1985
Cassie Pines (Ronee Blakley), a ditzy, idiotic, superstitious woman, travels by bus to Texas to find her soulmate on the advice of a psychic machine. Before she reaches her destination however, she comes across another psychic machine that warns her against continuing on her trip, citing the threat of a potential false prophet.

=== Season 2 (1985–1986) ===
No. overall	No. in season	Title	Directed by	Written by	Original release date
24	1	"The Impressionist"	Armand Mastroianni	Based on the short story "Impersonations" by : M. Coleman Easton adapted by : Haskell Barkin	September 29, 1985
Through a combination of blackmail and boredom with his career, nightclub impressionist Spiffy Remo/"Mr. Personalities" (Chuck McCann) is brought to a secret government facility that houses a stubborn alien known as Hoffgosh. Seeing that Hoffgosh communicates primarily in gestures, Remo is tasked with emulating said gestures with absolute perfection in order to communicate with the alien, who happens to hold the secret to nuclear fusion.
25	2	"Lifebomb"	Frank De Palma	Michael P Kube-McDowell	October 6, 1985
Ben Martin (Bill Macy), a workaholic corporate executive with an ailing heart, is given the chance to have a "Lifebomb", a medical device that incases him in a life-preserving cocoon should he suffer a heart attack, installed on his back. It isn't long before Ben begins growing tired of repeatedly being brought back to life, especially after his family leaves him and his health continues to decline.
26	3	"Ring Around the Redhead"	Ted Gershuny	Based on the short story by : John D. MacDonald adapted by : Ted Gershuny	October 13, 1985
In a story presented as a mashup of various film genres, Billy Malone (John Heard), an inventor sentenced to death for a murder he didn't commit, tells his story to a journalist named Adele. According to Billy, after an earthquake, a strange, metallic ring appeared in his workshop. Discovering that the ring acted as a gateway to alien planets and alternate dimensions, he began sending various probes into the ring to investigate whatever might be on the other side. During his one of his tests, he accidentally brought back Keena (Penelope Ann Miller), a woman from another planet who he eventually fell in love with, leading to the somewhat improbable circumstances leading to his arrest.
27	4	"Parlour Floor Front"	Richard Friedman	Carole Lucia Satrina	October 20, 1985
Young couple and landlords Doug and Linda (John Calonius and Donna Bullock) learn that one of their tenants, Mars Gillis (Adolph Caesar), is a practitioner of voodoo. Linda sees Gillis as a burden to their property, especially seeing as how he resides in the building's best room. She attempts to drive him out of the building, but is unable to evict him under the city's rent control laws. She instead hatches a new method to get rid of Mars by blaming him for various mishaps after he supposedly places a voodoo curse on them.
28	5	"Halloween Candy"	Tom Savini	Michael McDowell	October 27, 1985
Mr. Killup (Roy Poole) is a grumpy and misanthropic old man who hates Halloween, often spending the 31st of October tormenting trick-or-treaters who come to his door. This year however, he is visited by a sinister goblin who insistently demands candy. When its offer is repeatedly refused, the goblin punishes Mr. Killup by trapping him outside of time with little-to-no food, forcing him to sustain himself on the candy his son gave him to hand out.
29	6	"The Satanic Piano"	John Harrison	Story by : Carl Richard Jacobi adapted by : John Harrison	November 3, 1985
Pete Bancroft (Michael Warren), a musician in a creative slump, buys a revolutionary instrument that can read a person's thoughts and transform them into music. However, the instrument comes with a very high price; a price which Bancroft may not be willing to pay, especially since it leads to his daughter Justine (Lisa Bonet). being kidnapped by Wilson Farber, the man who sold Bancroft the instrument, who is actually a Satanist who uses it to drain her soul in a ploy to gain immortality.
30	7	"The Devil's Advocate"	Michael Gornick	George A Romero.	November 10, 1985
Luther Mandrake (Jerry Stiller) is the incredibly rude, arrogant, and mean-spirited host of a late-night radio show known as "The Devil's Advocate", where he unleashes the unbridled hatred he has accumulated through a life full of misery, hardship, and suffering onto callers eagerly seeking advice for the world's problems. One night, while taking some peculiar callers, Luther discovers that his constant anger and cynicism have led him into a deadly position. Luther is later contracted to be the literal devil's advocate; in exchange for continuing to make people miserable (and thus vulnerable to making deals with said devil), he gets great perks.
31	8	"Distant Signals"	Bill Travis	Story by : Andrew Weiner adapted by : Ted Gershuny	November 17, 1985
Television studio executive Gil Hurn (David Margulies) is approached by Mr. Smith (Lenny Von Dohlen), a mysterious investor who asks him to complete the final episodes of Max Paradise, a short-run detective series from 1965 that was cancelled before said episodes were aired. Mr. Smith and his mysterious backers are willing to pay any price, specifically gold bars, to see the series finished, complete with bringing the original actor, Van Conway (Darren McGavin), out of retirement. Unknown to the others, Mr. Smith is an alien from a planet that has received TV signals from Earth 20 years after they originally aired, and Max Paradise has become immensely popular on their planet.
32	9	"The Trouble with Mary Jane"	T.J. Castronova	Edithe Swensen	November 24, 1985
In a comedic parody of The Exorcist, inept occult practitioners Nora and Jack Mills (Phyllis Diller and Lawrence Tierney) are offered $50,000 to perform an exorcism on Mary Jane, a young girl possessed by a demonic seductress known as Aisha Candisha. Things go from bad to worse when the incompetent couple end up summoning another demon, a commander known as Gad, to get rid of Aisha, only for both demons to end up possessing Mary Jane. (Note: Tanya Fenmore, the young actress who played Mary Jane, was nominated for a Young Artist Award in 1987 for her performance in this episode.)
33	10	"Ursa Minor"	Ted Gershuny	Written by : Ted Gershuny based on a story by : John Sladek	December 1, 1985
A little girl named Susie (Jamie Ohar) blames her birthday present, a stuffed bear named Teddy, for various incidents around the house. Her parents, who don't remember purchasing Teddy in the first place, do not believe her... until Susie's mother (Marilyn Jones) discovers giant claw marks on the walls and overhears lumbering sounds at night. In the end, the mother destroys Teddy, but then has to deal with Teddy's mother: a bearskin rug in the attic.
34	11	"Effect and Cause"	Mark Jean	Michael P Kube-McDowell.	December 8, 1985
Former hippie and free-spirited artist Kate Collins (Susan Strasberg), after discovering a sinister painting in her collection and reusing the canvas, discovers that the laws of cause and effect are beginning to operate in reverse. She further discovers that she can also alter reality itself at random, but when she begins losing control of her newfound powers, which she believes are the result of "bad karma" accumulated from erasing the painting, things build up to an explosive conclusion.
35	12	"Monsters in My Room"	James Sadwith	James Sadwith	December 22, 1985
Timmy (Seth Green), a young boy who lives with an abusive stepfather named Biff (Greg Mullavey), discovers that various monsters (a witch, an octopus, a living buzz saw, and a troll) that may or may not be in his imagination are hiding in his room. Fortunately, his experiences with his stepfather allow Timmy to toughen himself up, whereupon he takes a stand against the creatures inhabiting his room.
36	13	"Comet Watch"	Warner Shook	Harvey Jacobs and Jule Selbo	January 2, 1986
Englebert Ames (Anthony Heald), an avid astronomer, uses an antique telescope contained within his house to view the coming of Halley's Comet. When the comet passes, he and his henpecking wife Charlene (Kate McGregor-Stewart) receive unexpected guests: Lara Burns (Sarah Rush), a woman from 1910 (the previous year the comet was sighted), and Sir Edmond Halley (Fritz Weaver) himself. In a twist of good luck, Edmond ends up stuck with Charlene on the comet, while Lara stays with Englert.
37	14	"Dream Girl"	Timna Ramon	Written by : Timna Ramon based on a story by : Barbara Paul	January 19, 1986
Theatrical director Andrea Caldwell (Carolyn Seymour) finds herself and her co-workers trapped in the dreams of weaselly stagehand Otto Schrog (Lou Cutell). Able to control reality in his dreams, Otto forces his prisoners put on a poorly-written play in which he is the star, having them cater to his every whim and fulfill his fantasies. Eventually, Andrea and the others formulate a plan to awaken Otto and return to the real world.
38	15	"A New Lease on Life"	John Strysik	Harvey Jacobs and Michael McDowell	January 26, 1986
Archie Fenton (Robert Rothman) moves into the St. George apartment complex to be closer to his new job, where he receives the modern, fully equipped apartment of his dreams. However, after noting that some of his neighbors are frightened and are subsequently going missing, Archie discovers that the building is actually a giant dragon shaped like a building, and that the dragon is fed leftovers and disrespectful tenants by landlady Madame Angler (Marie Windsor) and a pair of repairmen.
39	16	"Printer's Devil"	John Harrison	Written by : John Harrison based on a story by : Ron Goulart	February 2, 1986
Struggling author Junior P. Harmon (Larry Manetti) hires Alex Kellaway (Charles Knapp), a jolly and obese man, as his new agent. Upon meeting with Junior, Kellaway tells him that there is only one way he can make his novels succeed: animal sacrifice. As such, Junior regularly begins ordering and sacrificing animals, his work becoming more and more successful with each sacrifice. Alex also tells him that if he wants his dream novel to succeed, he needs to escalate the sacrifices.
40	17	"The Shrine"	Christopher T. Welch	Written by : Jule Selbo; Story by : Pamela Sargent	February 9, 1986
Christine Matthews (Lorna Luft), arriving at her childhood home to make amends with her mother following a nervous breakdown, discovers that her mother (Coleen Gray) has turned her old bedroom into a shrine. Christine also meets and competes against Chrissie, a sinister spirit taking the form of her younger self who her mother favors over her.
41	18	"The Old Soft Shoe"	Richard Friedman	Art Monterastelli	February 16, 1986
Chester Caruso (Paul Dooley), a former dancer turned lingerie salesman, rents a room at a motel. Inside his room, Chester is subsequently harassed by Glenda (Dorothy Parke), an alluring but volatile ghost of a woman who seems to confuse him for Harry, a man who had supposedly been cheating on her.
42	19	"The Last Car"	John Strysik	Michael McDowell	February 23, 1986
College student Stacey (Begoña Plaza) boards a mysterious train to travel home for Thanksgiving. After being seated in the train's last car, meeting the somewhat bizarre passengers, and witnessing various oddities occur whenever the car passes through a tunnel, Stacey soon discovers a horrific truth about the train, its passengers, and herself. (Note: The young boy, Scooter Stevens, was nominated for a Young Artist Award in 1987 for his performance in this episode.)
43	20	"A Choice of Dreams"	Jerry Smith	Written by : James Houghton; Story by : Edward F. Shaver	May 4, 1986
Jake Corelli (Abe Vigoda) is a mob boss who discovers he is dying of terminal cancer. He is offered the chance to test Afterlife, a scientific process that keeps his brain alive so he can experience peaceful dreams forever after his death. It isn't long before the scientist who created Afterlife tampers with its workings, causing Jake's dreams to become nightmares.
44	21	"Strange Love"	Ted Gershuny	Edithe Swensen	May 11, 1986
In 1935, Dr. Philip Carrol (Patrick Kilpatrick) makes a late-night house call to fix the broken leg of a woman named Marie Alcott (Marcia Cross). Marie and her husband Edmund (Harsh Nayyar), who are revealed to be vampires, proceed to make Dr. Carrol their slave. They force him to heal Marie's leg, then plan to kill and feed on him when he is no longer of use to them. Growing attracted to Carrol however, Marie begins to have second thoughts about her husband's plans.
45	22	"The Unhappy Medium"	Dusty Nelson	Edithe Swensen	May 18, 1986
Farley Bright (Peter Miller), recently deceased, was a corrupt televangelist and founder of the Church of the Bright Tomorrow. Through his videotaped will, Farley tells his surviving family, niece Jenny, her boyfriend Johnathan, and her mother Caroline (Carolyn Clark, Richard Kuhlman, and Connie Stevens) that he will send them a sign. The sign ultimately comes when his equally crooked relatives find themselves trapped between Heaven and Hell. Farley also possesses Jenny, planning to use her both as a vessel for his comeback and as a means to escape being condemned to Hell for his corrupt ways.
46	23	"Fear of Floating"	John Lewis	Written by : Donald Wollner; Story by : Scott Edelman	May 23, 1986
Arnold Barker (Howard Sherman) is a compulsive liar who miraculously has the ability to float whenever he lies. Having supposedly been exhibited as "The Human Balloon" in a circus and subsequently escaping, he seeks shelter in an Army recruitment office. Soon after, a young pregnant girl and her angry father (Yeardley Smith and John Ridge) offer a different explanation as to why Arnold is on the run.
47	24	"The Casavin Curse"	Frank De Palma	Edith Swensen	July 13, 1986
Gina Casavin (Catherine Parks), born into a wealthy family, brutally murders her latest lover. She assures the psychologist that analyzes her, Dr. Webster (Scott Lincoln), that she has been cursed. While Webster initially deduces that the curse is a ploy by Gina's incestuous cousin to keep her under his power, it is ultimately revealed that Gina has been telling the truth: her great-grandfather Anton Casavin had the opportunity to marry into a wealthy family. He had previously been married to a gypsy named Mirabel, and when refused a divorce, proceeded to kill her. With her last breath, Mirabel put a curse on Anton and his descendants... a curse that ensures any member the Casavin family will destroy whoever they love.

=== Season 3 (1986–1987) ===
No. overall	No. in season	Title	Directed by	Written by	Original release date
48	1	"The Circus"	Michael Gornick	George A Romero	September 28, 1986
Dr. Niss (William Hickey) is the founder and ringmaster of the "Exhibition of Wonder", a twisted circus that showcases real-life monsters as its main attractions. Bragg (Kevin O'Connor), a cynical and skeptical newspaper columnist who specializes in debunking charlatans, investigates Niss' circus to prove that it is fake. When he sticks his nose where it does not belong, Bragg ends up becoming part of the troupe.
49	2	"I Can't Help Saying Goodbye"	John Strysik	Jule Selbo	October 5, 1986
Libby (Loren Cedar) and her choir director fiancé Max (Brian Benben) notice that people keep dying in the presence of her younger sister Karen (Allison Sweeney). It become apparent that Karen can sense when people around her are about to die, and does so by placing her hands on their face and saying "goodbye" to them; however, they think she induces the fatalities, including her parents. In a mix of sorrow, anger, and fear, Libby and Max tell Karen to never say "goodbye" to anyone again, but when Karen ends up "saying goodbye" to Max, Libby takes drastic (and ultimately tragic) measures to solve the problem.
50	3	"The Bitterest Pill"	Bryan Michael Stoller	Based on the short story "The Richest Man in Levittown" by : Frederik Pohl adapted by : Michael P. Kube-McDowell	October 12, 1986
Jonathan Bender (Jason Horst), a boy mistreated and called "stupid" by his parents, is visited by Tinker (Mark Blankfield), an eccentric scientist and family friend. Tinker has developed a miraculous pill that increases brain power and memory, and as Johnathan's family have recently won the lottery, he approaches the boy's parents (Joseph Carafello and Catherine Battistone) for financial support. Eventually, Tinker ends up dying from the excruciating amount of knowledge he has absorbed. Afterwards, Jonathan ingests the prototype pill, using his astounding new intellect to gain power over his parents.
51	4	"Florence Bravo"	John Lewis	Edithe Swensen	October 19, 1986
Following a case of adultery, Dr. David McCall (David Hayward) and his wife Emily (Lori Cardille) move into an old house in which a woman murdered her cheating husband. A man-hating spirit named Florence Bravo decides to recreate the events that led to her husband's death to make Emily her companion. Pressured by the ghost, Emily overhears her husband talking to realtor Julian Hanratty (Carol Levy) the next day, mistaking their conversation as a proposition for sex; in reality, David has decided the house is giving his wife's imagination too much to work with. When he tries explaining things to Emily, she is now fully under Bravo's sway and kills him in the exactly the same way as Bravo's husband. The episode ends with both Emily and Florence giggling madly; implying Emily was given the death sentence and has become a ghost.
52	5	"The Geezenstacks"	Bill Travis	Based on the short story by : Frederic Brown adapted by : Nancy Doyne	October 26, 1986
Audrey Hummel (Lana Hirsch), a cheerful little girl, is given a dollhouse by her Uncle Richard (Larry Pine), who explains that the house he originally found it in was empty. Audrey's father Sam (Craig Wasson) soon notices that whatever Audrey describes happening to her doll family, the Geezenstacks, carries over into reality and affects the Hummels as well. The ending displays a unique variation on the Droste effect.
53	6	"Black Widows"	Karl Epstein	Michael McDowell	November 2, 1986
Against the wishes of her reclusive mother Mildred (Margaret O'Brien), trailer park resident Audrey Webster (Theresa Saldana) has decided to marry who she believes to be the man of her dreams. On her wedding night however, Audrey ends up killing and devouring her new husband; horrifying her. In the process, she finally discovers the reason for her mother's mysterious reclusiveness... as well as a dark secret about the women in her family.
54	7	"Heretic"	Jerry Smith	Edithe Swensen	November 9, 1986
Harte (Bruce MacVittie), an unscrupulous art dealer, buys a stolen painting of the Spanish Inquisition from a thief. Harte soon regrets his purchase when he is visited by a mysterious monk (Alan Scarfe) who begs him to repent his sins and return the painting. When Harte refuses, he is suddenly transported inside the painting, where he is tortured and forced to confess his crimes before the Inquisition itself.
55	8	"A Serpent's Tooth"	Frank De Palma	Edithe Swensen	November 16, 1986
Controlling mother Pearl King (Renée Taylor) is given a serpent's tooth by a friend, causing her various metaphors and hyperbole to come true. Her newfound power also forces her children to obey her; her son Marc (Brett Marx) studies dentistry instead of agriculture, while her daughter Madeline (JoAnn Willette) is forced to dress in outdated and feminine styled clothes. After she accidentally turns Madeline's boyfriend Barry (Ron Sloane) into a slice of bread, Pearl's children snap at her. In the end, Pearl accidentally turns herself into a pillar of salt after saying to be turned into one if she was a bad mother; though the shock makes Marc and Madeline live 50% of what Pearl wanted. A still conscious, but immobile Pearl thinks "They're nice kids. It was worth it."
56	9	"Baker's Dozen"	John Sutherland	George A Romero.	November 23, 1986
In New Orleans, voodoo witch Ruby Cuzzins (Mabel King) owns and operates the Cuzzins Dozens cookie shop, where she bakes and sells cookies with magical properties. Ruby also regularly punishes her assistant and father Aloysius (Vernon Washington), who routinely ran out on her and her mother to get drunk on moonshine, by painfully transforming him into a rat. One day, Ruby partners up with Henry Hogan (Larry Manetti), an unscrupulous advertising executive who seeks to profit from her special recipes. Little does Henry know that Ruby hopes to profit from him as well, and uses her special recipes to exact revenge when she is denied her share of the profits.
57	10	"Deliver Us From Goodness"	Warner Shook	Written by : Jule Selbo; Story by : Suzette Haden Elgin	November 30, 1986
Valeria Cantrell (Kaiulani Lee), an incredibly generous, wholesome, and faithful housewife, discovers that she has somehow been sainted; granted the ability to perform actual miracles. Fearing that her newfound sainthood is becoming a burden to her daughter Charlotte (Jane Adams) and effecting the popularity of her mayoral candidate husband Julian (Steve Vinovich), Valeria attempts to break each of the Ten Commandments in numerical order to fall from grace.
58	11	"Seasons of Belief"	Michael McDowell	Written by : Michael McDowell; Story by : Michael Bishop	December 29, 1986
On Christmas Eve, rowdy siblings Stefa and Jimbo (Jenna von Oÿ and Sky Berdahl) demand to be told a story. Their mean-spirited parents (E. G. Marshall and Margaret Klenck) decide to tell them a different kind of Christmas story. They tell their children about the "Grither", a monster that lives in a cave at the North Pole that hunts down and kills anyone who says its name, regardless of how far away they are.
59	12	"Miss May Dusa"	Richard Blackburn	Richard Blackburn	January 18, 1987
In a neo-noir adaptation of an ancient myth, Medusa (Sofia Landon Geier) (who calls herself "May Dusa"), suffering from amnesia, finds herself inside a store in New York City. Making her way to the subway, she meets and befriends Jimmy James (Gary Majchrazak), a saxophone player who happens to be blind. As she falls in love with James, "May" slowly uncovers the truth behind the deaths she's accidentally caused everywhere she's been, leading to her love story becoming a tragedy. This was the posthumous final role of Steve Tracy as the Robber.
60	13	"The Milkman Cometh"	John Strysik	Written by : Donald Wollner; Based on the short story "Temperature Days on Hawthorne Street" by : Charles L. Grant	January 25, 1987
A mysterious being known as the Milkman (whom no one in the neighborhood has ever actually seen) grants the wishes of people who leave a note with their discarded milk bottles. To the horror of artist Garry Cooley (Robert Forster), he learns that the Milkman can mix up the meaning of the notes he receives if they are written metaphorically. This comes back to haunt Cooley when his wife Ruth (Shannon Wilcox), previously infertile after their first child, gives birth again. Guest-starring Robert Forster and Chad Allen.
61	14	"My Ghostwriter - The Vampire"	Frank De Palma	Story by : Scott Edelman adapted by : Peter O'Keefe	February 1, 1987
Talentless vampire novel author Peter Prentice (Jeff Conaway), known for stealing ideas from his assistant and ghostwriter Jayne, discovers Count Draco (Roy Dotrice), an actual vampire who had been slumbering in the coffin he bought for inspiration. Peter makes a deal with Draco, offering him sanctuary if he helps provide material for his failing novels. Eventually, Peter's latest book, 900 Years of Darkness, becomes wildly successful, but Draco begins growing bitter when refused his royalties.
62	15	"My Own Place"	Ted Gershuny	Ted Gershuny	February 8, 1987
Yuppie investment banker Sandy Darhaus (Perry Lang), after spending many years being forced to live with roommates for financial security, finally receives a lavish apartment to own for himself. He soon discovers that his new home comes with Ram (Harsh Nayyar), a mysterious guest from India who appears to live in the apartment as well, but who only appears when Sandy is alone.
63	16	"Red Leader"	John Sutherland	Edithe Swensen	February 15, 1987
Alex Hayes (Joe E. Tata), a shady and unscrupulous construction mogul, ends up meeting his deceased business partner Jake Caine (Carmine Caridi), who literally climbs out of Hell to see him. Alex also comes face to face with the Devil (Peter Bromilow) himself. Thoroughly impressed by his lifetime of sin, the Devil offers Alex a position among his forces.
64	17	"Everybody Needs a Little Love"	John Harrison (as John Sutherland)	Based on the short story by : Robert Bloch adapted by : John Harrison (as John Sutherland)	February 22, 1987
In a tribute to classic film noir, Curtis (Richard Portnow), a divorced and lonely drunk, purchases a mannequin he names "Estelle". Curtis' friend Roberts (Jerry Orbach) notices that Curtis has begun talking to and doting over the mannequin, treating it like a real person. As Roberts begins to grow concerned about his friend's apparently deteriorating mental stability, it is hinted that Curtis' love may have sinister intentions.
65	18	"Auld Acquaintances"	Richard Friedman	Edithe Swensen	March 1, 1987
Mary Hobbs and Elizabeth Eaton (Sally Gracie and Linda Thorson), a pair of powerful witches, meet and ultimately lock themselves in the prison cell where they first met in the 1600s, which has since become part of a museum. The witches had previously made an arrangement to share an antique talisman that carries great power for one year at a time, and promptly reignite their centuries-old feud over the item.
66	19	"The Social Climber"	Armand Mastroianni	Ellen Sandhaus	March 8, 1987
Rob (Robert Romanus), the apprentice of a talented shoemaker named Anthony (Albert Hague), finds that he can actually live other people's lives by wearing the shoes Anthony makes for them. As Rob has no ambition whatsoever to put in the work necessary to make a name for himself, he continues, against his boss' warnings, to wear these magic shoes to live the lives of people more successful than him, which leads to a ghastly outcome.
67	20	"The Swap"	John Drury	Dick Benner	May 3, 1987
Bubba (Charles Ludlam), a lecherous and wealthy man covered in skin lesions, discovers that his wife Anna Belle (Maria Manuche) is having an affair with handyman Claude Altoose (Jim Wlcek), and that the duo plan to murder him for his money. Upon learning this, Bubba turns to the spells of his late mother, a powerful sorceress, to ensure that their plot doesn't succeed by swapping bodies with someone else.
68	21	"Let the Games Begin"	John Lewis	Peter O'Keefe	May 10, 1987
Harry Carson (Earl Hindman) drunkenly dies of a heart attack in his hotel room. Before long, an angel and a demon arrive, arguing with one another about who is to escort Harry to the afterlife. The angel, taking the form of Harry's best friend Aldo (David Groh), and the demon, taking the form of Harry's sister-in-law Doris (Jane Summerhays), manage to revive Harry. The duo proceed to challenge Harry to a test of morality to determine once and for all which of them gains his soul.
69	22	"The Enormous Radio"	Bill Travis	Written by : Guy Gallo; Story by : John Cheever	May 17, 1987
During the Great Depression, married couple Irene and Jim (Christine Estabrook and John Rothman) purchase a new radio. Irene discovers that the radio is able to pick up signals from other tenants in their apartment building, so she uses it to constantly eavesdrop on her neighbors, growing obsessed with peering into their private lives.

=== Season 4 (1987–1988) ===
No. overall	No. in season	Title	Directed by	Written by	Original release date
70	1	"Beetles"	Frank De Palma	Robert Bloch	September 27, 1987
Archeologist Arthur Hartley (Rod McCary) has recently come into the possession of a stolen sarcophagus filled with treasure. He is visited by a mysterious man known as Hammid Bey (Sirri Murad), who warns him against touching the mummy that is also housed in the sarcoghagus, as it is cursed. When Arthur ignores Hammid's warning and touches the mummy, he notices that scarab beetles have mysteriously begun appearing throughout his house. Co-stars Colm Meaney as a police constable.
71	2	"Mary, Mary"	Katarina Wittich	Jule Selbo	October 4, 1987
Mary Jones (Margaret Whitton), a photographer who suffers from cripplingly low self-esteem, isolates herself from the world and turns to dolls and mannequins for friendship. Mary also becomes gripped with fear after a neighbor, David (A.C. Weary), makes romantic advances towards her, believing herself not to be worthy his or anyone's love. Eventually, Mary's continuous self-loathing leads to a tragic conclusion.
72	3	"The Spirit Photographer"	Bill Travis	Mark Patrick Carducci and Brian Thomas Jones	October 11, 1987
Paranormal investigator Algernon Colesbury (Frank Hamilton) invents a special camera capable of taking perfect photographs of ghosts. Ignoring the skepticism of his best friend Harry Bainbridge (Richard Clarke), Algernon has purchased a haunted house so he can use it as a testing site for the camera, hoping to once and for all prove to the world that ghosts do exist.
73	4	"The Moth"	Jeffrey Wolf	Michael McDowell	October 18, 1987
Sybil (Debbie Harry), a mischievous and heartless witch, returns home fatally stabbed. Convinced that her soul will exit her body in the form of a moth upon her death, Sybil demands that her good-hearted, Christian mother (Jane Manning) capture the moth and utilize it in a ritual that will allow Sybil to return to life so she can continue wreaking havoc. The circumstances of Sybil's last request ultimately cause her mother, who has loved her in spite of all the pain and misery she caused her and the townspeople, to suffer a crisis of faith and conscience.
74	5	"No Strings"	David Odell	David Odell	October 25, 1987
Eddie Minelli (T.J. Castronova, who also executive-produced the series), a cruel and twisted mob boss, has his subordinate Nicky (Bradley Fisher) kidnap noted puppeteer Aldo De Calasuro (Barry Dennen), whereupon Eddie forces him to string up the corpse of his murdered rival Fat Paulie (Derek Doughran). With his floozy Tiffany (Cameron Milzer) at his side, Eddie celebrates the defeat of his rival by watching Aldo puppeteer the corpse to put on a one-man show where "Paulie" praises Eddie, but the result of such an act is unexpected for all involved.
75	6	"The Grave Robber"	Jeff Schiro	Harvey Jacobs and Donald Wollner	November 1, 1987
Unscrupulous but cowardly grave robber Harold Gormley (Daren Kelly) and his girlfriend Aileen (Polly Draper) discover an Egyptian tomb filled with treasure. In the process, they awaken Tapok (Arnold Stang), a short-tempered mummy who was once Lord Chamberlain to the Pharaoh, but now serves as guardian of the tomb. After some negotiation from Aileen, Tapok allows the duo to leave the tomb alive, but only if they can best him in a series of games... culminating in a round of strip poker.
76	7	"The Yattering and Jack"	David Odell	Adapted for television (from his short story of the same name) by : Clive Barker	November 8, 1987
A diminutive demon known as The Yattering (Phil Fondacaro) is assigned by Beelzebub (Tom Newman) to obtain the soul of pickle salesman Jack Polo (Antony Carbone); intending to drive him insane to the point where he renounces his faith in God. As his master warns him, the Yattering must proceed with caution on its mission, for if the demon touches Jack before claiming his soul, the demon will become Jack's slave for eternity. Complicating matters, the carefree Jack refuses to acknowledge the paranormal phenomena The Yattering creates, frustrating the demon to no end. In contrast, Jack's daughter Amanda (Danielle Brisebois) does indeed notice the strange happenings throughout her father's house, and her father's devil-may-care attitude leaves her gravely concerned.
77	8	"Seymourlama"	Bruce Dolin	Harvey Jacobs and Donald Wollner	November 15, 1987
Henry and Ellen Strand (David Gale and Kathleen Doyle) are visited one night by Chai Fung and Madame Wu (Divine and Cathy Lipinski), representatives of a small Himalayan country known as Lo Poa. The Strands are surprised to learn that the duo have come to collect their teenage son Seymour (J. D. Roth), who has been signified by an ancient religious prophecy to become the next lama of their nation. Overcome by the fame, fortune, and women his new position grants him, Seymour promptly lets the power go to his head, using his authority to torment his parents.
78	9	"Sorry, Right Number"	John Harrison	Written by : Stephen King; Based on : Sorry, Right Number	November 22, 1987
Katie Weiderman (Deborah Harmon), wife of famed horror novelist William Weiderman (Arthur Taxier), receives a peculiar phone call one night. The voice on the other end sounds horribly distraught and traumatized, prompting Katie to believe that it may belong to a member of her family. To that end, Katie calls and visits every relative she can think of, but they all appear to be safe. When she returns home, she discovers Bill has died of a heart attack. On the fifth anniversary of Bill's death, Katie finally discovers the truth behind the mysterious call, but is far too late to do anything about it.
79	10	"Payment Overdue"	John Drury	Dick Benner	February 14, 1988
Jeanette Simpson (Maura Swanson) is a heartless debt collector who gets her clients, primarily children, the elderly, and the less fortunate, to pay her by threatening legal action and even imprisonment upon them. Rita Valdez (Wanda De Jesus), a poor woman suffering from a brain tumor, commits suicide when Jeanette threatens to take her to court if she doesn't receive payment. After receiving calls from Rita from beyond the grave, Jeanette is visited by Rita's attorney, Michael Nelson (Lewis Arlt). Michael is ultimately revealed to actually be Rita's guardian angel, having been sent to punish Jeanette for her amoral behavior and her role in Rita's death.
80	11	"Love Hungry"	John Strysik	Written by : John Strysik & Jule Selbo; Based on the short story "Food for Thought" by : Roberts Gannaway	February 21, 1988
Overweight telemarketer Betsy Cowland (Sharon Madden) discovers that her high school lover, Elmo Shroud (Larry Gelman), is back in town. Desperate to lose weight and have Elmo find her attractive again, Betsy is inspired to try a mysterious weight loss program known as "Weight Away". She receives a pair of glasses and a hearing aid which makes her visualize all food as sentient beings that feel excruciating pain when eaten. To Betsy's horror, the items become fused to her head, so she slowly starves herself in order to keep her now self-aware food alive longer.
81	12	"The Deal"	T.J. Castronova	Granville Burgess and Allen Coulter	February 28, 1988
Aspiring screenwriter Tom Dash (Bradley Whitford) has moved to Hollywood to become the next big thing in the movie industry. Unfortunately, his work is continuously rejected by film studios all throughout the town. Out of options, Tom is offered help with his plight by his neighbor Donald (Allen Garfield), who claims to have connections in the movie business. Little does Tom realize that Donald is actually the Devil, who expects Tom to give him his soul in exchange for his newfound success. Donald does tell Tom that he can get out of their deal, but only if he finds someone as desperate for success as he once was to replace him.
82	13	"The Apprentice"	Eleanor Gaver	Ellen Sandhaus	May 1, 1988
Feminist college student Sarah McBride (Haviland Morris) applies for a part-time job in Magistrate, a living museum that recreates life in 17th century Salem. Eventually, Sarah wanders through a mist-shrouded closet and falls unconscious. When she awakens, Sarah discovers that she has actually traveled back in time to 1692, where her supposed superior, Thomas Branford (Wayne Tippit), reacts to her modern, rebellious and feminist mindset by forcing her to work as a near-slave and ultimately having her be condemned as a witch.
83	14	"The Cutty Black Sow"	Richard Glass	Based on a story by : Thomas F. Monteleone; Adapted by : Michael McDowell	May 8, 1988
On the night before Halloween, young Jamie (Huckleberry Fox) is warned by his dying great-grandmother (Paula Trueman) about the Cutty Black Sow, a demon of Celtic lore that steals the souls of all who die on All Hallow's Eve. In an effort to protect his great-grandmother's soul, as well as the souls of his family, Jamie attempts to ward off the Cutty Black Sow by performing a ritual with supplies his great-grandmother has stored away.
84	15	"Do Not Open This Box"	Jodie Foster	Franco Amurri	May 15, 1988
Charles Pennywell (William LeMassena) is a meek would-be-inventor who is content with "the quiet life." Yet Ruth (Eileen Heckart), his overbearing and opportunistic wife of 35 years, is anything but content; she openly regrets her choice of husband...and is bitterly jealous of their neighbor Clarissa Sanderson, a wealthy and sweet-tempered widow. One day, Charlie comes across a box in his basement-workshop...a box with the title warning inscribed on it. Being Ruth, she forces open the box despite Charlie's objections; it seems to be empty. That's when the postman (Richard B. Shull) who delivered said box comes to collect it...offering the Pennywells whatever they desire for its safe return, providing the box hasn't been opened. When it soon becomes apparent that Ruth has no intention of giving back the box -- which, in fact, contained something money literally cannot buy -- the postman reveals his true identity.
85	16	"Family Reunion"	Tom Savini	Edithe Swensen	May 22, 1988
Robert Perry (Stephen McHattie) keeps his ill son Bobby (Daniel Terrance Kelly) chained up and locked away from the world until he can be cured. Bobby's worried mother Janice (Patricia Tallman) desperately wants to be reunited with her child, so she enlists Trudy (Marilyn Rockafellow), a social worker, in an attempt to regain custody of Bobby. It is later revealed that there is more to Bobby's "illness" than meets the eye, and that Janice had a very good reason for why she wanted her son back.
86	17	"Going Native"	Andrew Weiner	Ted Gershuny	June 19, 1988
Claire (Kim Greist) is an emotionless agent from an alien planet masquerading as a photographer. Every photograph she takes on her mission is sent to her superiors back on her world, who wish to learn about humanity. For the final part of her assignment, Claire is tasked with joining a therapy group in an effort to understand human emotion. Claire must take great care not to get emotional herself, for if she feels what the humans feel, she will be banished from her planet forever.
87	18	"Hush"	Allen Coulter	Adapted by : John Harrison (as John Sutherland); Based on a story by : Zenna Henderson	July 10, 1988
Buddy Warren (Eric Jason), a child prodigy and the son of a talented inventor, creates the Noise Eater, a machine that is able to silence things by sucking the life out of them. When the Noise Eater ends up destroying its control mechanism and goes haywire, Buddy enlists his babysitter Jennifer (Nile Lanning) to help him stop the machine before it escapes the confines of the house and makes everything quiet.
88	19	"Barter"	Christopher T. Welch	Jule Selbo	July 17, 1988
In a parody of I Love Lucy, Ruthie (Jill Jaress) becomes stressed when her son Little Nicky (Miguel Alamo) begins taking up the drums, hindering her ability to handle the chores and care for her husband Nicky (Michael Santiago). One day, an alien salesman known as Klaatzu (Jack Carter) arrives at the family's door, asking Ruthie for some ammonia. When given some, Klaatzu drinks it, and thanks Ruthie by giving her a device capable of freezing time. Ruthie uses the device to pause Little Nicky so she can finally get some peace and quiet, but when the device ends up breaking, Ruthie must call Klaatzu back to help her, the salesman desiring something far more valuable in exchange for his services.
89	20	"Basher Malone"	Anthony Santa Croce	Peter O'Keefe	July 24, 1988
Basher Malone (Stephen Cepello, credited as Steve Strong), a professional wrestler with a heart of gold, is at the top of his game. Accompanied by his affectionate mother (Marie Denn) at every match, Basher hopes to use his unbeatable skills to rid the wrestling world of competitors who play dirty, while also giving the "impressionable children" watching a good role model to look up to. Incensed with Basher's popularity, crooked manager Tippy Ryan (Vic Tayback), whose own unscrupulous wrestlers once ruled the circuit before Basher came along, challenges Basher to a final, one-on-one fight against his newest client, a demonic wrestler known as Trog (Magic Schwarz). If Basher wins, Tippy must close his gym and lay off his fighters, but if Basher loses, he must give up professional wrestling forever.

== See also ==
- Tales from the Darkside: The Movie
