= Andrew Laszlo =

Hungarian-American cinematographer

- Born: László András; January 12, 1926; Pápa, Hungary
- Died: October 7, 2011 (aged 85); Bozeman, Montana
- Years active: 1963–1992
- Spouse: Ann Granger
- Children: 4

Andrew Laszlo A.S.C. (January 12, 1926 – October 7, 2011, Hungarian: László András) was a Hungarian-American cinematographer.

== Early life (1926–1941) ==
I never believed I was anybody special. I still don't think so, nor did I ever believe that anyone would give a hoot hearing about who I was, where I came from, what I did at various stages of my life, and why. I am convinced the world would function equally well, or equally badly, with or without me. - Andrew Laszlo, Footnote to History, 2002

This marks the beginning of a section in Andrew Laszlo's account of his early years, where he reflects on his own experiences as a man who survived atrocities during that time and later achieved notable success in his life.

He was born László András in 1926, in the vicinity of Pápa, Hungary, the town where his family finally settled about the time that Andrew was three years old. Until World War II began to affect life in Hungary, his life was relatively carefree and was spent in relative comfort although the family had to move several times into smaller or bigger quarters depending on the financial circumstances of his father.

Of his many early experiences, one that served as a prelude to later tragedies, was seeing the Graf Zeppelin fly over Papa. Inquiring about the symbol painted on the tail of the airship, Andrew's father said that it was a swastika. That is all he wanted to tell his young son at the time.

Andrew Laszlo was known for his athletic abilities, excelling in swimming and skating during his early school years. He later developed a talent for fencing in high school, showcasing his versatility in sports. It was also during this time that his interest in photography began and led later to a small business printing photos for his classmates.

In the late 1930s, Laszlo's father, Leslie (Hungarian: Laci), was called up to serve in the Hungarian Army. This effectively ruined his business, forcing Laszlo to learn the fine art of lampshade manufacture to help support the family. This was a successful undertaking even though Laszlo was still a full-time high school student. Then, as for everyone else, World War II turned everything up-side-down.

== The War Years (1941-1947) ==
In June 1941, the Hungarian city of Kassa (today Košice in Slovakia) was bombed by air. Although several theories are still debated about the real perpetrators, the Hungarian government used the incident as the reason for declaring war on the Soviet Union. From then on, Hungary was irreversibly tied to the Axis powers and Germany/Hitler in particular. Antisemitism that had been simmering for years now came to the fore in Hungary. In 1944, a part of Papa was turned into a Ghetto and all Jews were forced to move there, including the Laszlo family. In early June, Andrew was forced to join a Labor Camp and was taken there in a railroad cattle car. On June 29, his family (excepting his brother, Sándor) was taken from Papa and sent to Auschwitz. Andrew was then taken to another labor camp in what is now Romania and put to work laying railroad track. After one more move to another camp, Andrew received a final postcard from his brother, Sándor.

Following an air raid on the labor camp, Andrew deserted and found his way to Budapest. After a short stay in City Park (Hungarian: Varosliget) he and hundreds of others were herded onto boxcars and sent to the Bergen-Belsen concentration camp. This was the winter of 1944. Here, he survived for months in an atmosphere of cold, starvation, beatings, outright murder, lice infestation and constant reminders of death. Near his 19th birthday, he spotted his Aunt Alice in the camp. She perished there not much later.

In March 1945, with the pressure on the Germans in Norway increasing, Andrew was shipped to the concentration camp at Theresienstadt. Here, like thousands of others, he came down with typhoid fever. It was here that he was reunited with his father, someone he thought of as long dead. Finally, on May 8, 1945, Theresienstadt was liberated by the Soviet army. As part of returning to humanity, Andrew found a piano at the camp and asked his fellow Hungarian, pianist George Feyer, to play for the liberators and the liberated.

On his return to Papa, he found the town to be a much different place, including it being run by the Soviet Army. Being entrepreneurial, he restarted his photography business with the Russian soldiers being great customers. After taking the final exam, Andrew got his high school diploma and then moved to Budapest where a job at the Hungarian Film Bureau was waiting for him. Unfortunately, this job was not very exciting and paid little. Andrew realized that it would take years for the Hungarian movie business to return to its former self and did not want to wait that long. So, he went back to Papa and began to plan for his immigration to the United States at the urging of his uncle, George Laszlo, who was already living in New York and was willing to sponsor him. He found his way to New York by way of Ulm, Germany, where he survived by selling American cigarettes (sent to him by Uncle George) to the locals. After a brief but obligatory stop in Frankfurt, Andrew was given the right to enter the United States. He did so on January 17, 1947, by walking down the gangplank of the SS Ernie Pyle after it had docked on the west side of Manhattan. He had turned 21 just five days earlier.

== Life and Career in the United States (1947-1996) ==
On arrival, Andrew was taken under the wings of his Uncle, George Laszlo, who was a painter, inventor and lithographer already living in New York City. Andrew quickly adjusted to life in Manhattan. As he stated in his own words for the documentary Cinematographer Style:

My main objective was to keep my head above water, work and have enough money to live, learn the language, the faster the better, because that was the most essential element in getting work. Most importantly, I was trying to get work that was in some ways connected with photography.

For some time I worked in the laboratory of a company that printed textiles and wallpaper with a photographic process. I worked in the darkroom, as I put it, to keep my fingers in the developer. At one time, I worked as a door-to-door baby photographer. I had a camera and a few lights I could do the work with.

Then the greatest break of my life came. I was the number one person from New York City to be drafted by the army for the Korean War. I wound up in the U.S. Army motion picture school, which was wonderful. We not only had all the equipment, the school insisted we shoot 35mm motion picture film, day-in and day-out, thousands of feet and, of course, doing it is the greatest way to learn.

When I came out of the army it was a little bit rough. I was a young fellow, trying to enter the industry, which was very difficult because I had no track record. I tried absolutely everything to get work. In fact, I resorted to gags that nowadays I’m actually a bit self-conscious to talk about. I was turned down by so many producers, even smalltime ones; I couldn’t even get past secretaries. At one point, I sent out hand-printed résumés on sandpaper just so they would remember it. I sent out résumés on shirt cardboard so they couldn’t crumple it up and toss it in the wastebasket. The breaks finally came. I took any job offered to me, as long as I had a chance to be behind a camera, do some lighting, experiment with lenses and so on. Then better jobs were offered and that is how I got started. As I said earlier, the important thing is to stick with it.

Shortly before his discharge from the US Army Signal Corps, Andrew married his New York-born sweetheart, Ann Granger. Soon, the family grew to three with the arrival of his first son, also named Andrew. With perseverance, he landed a job as a camera operator on The Phil Silvers Show. This was followed by a number of other TV shows, including Naked City where he served as the Director of Photography. With greater opportunities came the necessity to work on locations around the world. Resisting the temptation to move to Hollywood, Andrew settled with his family in the suburbs of New York where three more children (Jim, Jeffrey and Elizabeth) arrived in quick succession.

Andrew started to work with TV personality Ed Sullivan in 1953 and filmed programs in Portugal, Alaska, and Ireland. In 1959, Ed 'kidnapped' Andrew to Havana, Cuba under the pretense that they would be filming a segment in the Dominican Republic. Ed's real goal was to do an interview with Fidel Castro who had just overthrown Fulgencio Batista's government. Ed, unfortunately, did not realize that the electrical system in Cuba would not support the camera equipment and lighting normally used in the United States. This created enormous technical issues for the crew with the possibility that the equipment could cause a blackout in the entire neighborhood. Somehow, the footage turned out OK if only passably so.

In 1962, Andrew was offered his first feature film, One Potato, Two Potato, a controversial film about the interracial marriage of a black man and white divorcee. In 1966, he filmed Francis Ford Coppola's You're A Big Boy Now, with Geraldine Page receiving an Oscar nomination as Best Supporting Actress. This was followed in 1968 by The Night They Raided Minsky's, a big-budget musical marred by the mid-production death of Bert Lahr.

On August 15, 1965, The Beatles were scheduled to give a concert at Shea Stadium in New York City. Andrew took on this Ed Sullivan production with trepidation and excitement since it would be the first extremely large rock concert to be filmed for television. Even with careful preparation, the film crew was not prepared for the piercing screams of an audience made up of 56,000 teenagers. The sound system was completely overwhelmed, making it necessary to dub much of the song tracks in post-production. Nevertheless, and using 14 cameras scattered through the place, the crew managed to film not just the Beatles but much of the audience in the stands and the security detail that was hoping that a major stampede would not break out. When all was said and done, the crew had recorded over 200,000 feet of film of which only 10,800 made it into the finished documentary. As a long-lasting effect, Andrew's hearing was never to be normal again.

In 1979, he filmed Walter Hill's cult film The Warriors. This movie gave Andrew the opportunity to devise several cinematic techniques, including the innovative lighting used for subway car interior shots. Musing in his 2000 book "Every Frame a Rembrandt," he says:

If made today, The Warriors would probably be an altogether different movie. The availability of fast and more sensitive, more forgiving negative and positive film stocks, faster lenses in all focal ranges, smaller, more powerful lights, electronic postproduction - all would add up to different photographic techniques, which would negate the need for the same ingenuity in dealing with the difficulties of cinematography in 1978.

Returning to television, Andrew was the cinematographer on the 1980 five-part NBC miniseries Shōgun starring Richard Chamberlain. Filmed entirely on location in Japan, the production had many difficulties including the challenge of conversation with and direction to actors and extras who spoke no English. An unfortunate but funny anecdote often retold by Andrew was the premature kickoff of a fierce action sequence in Osaka harbor including guns blazing, extras jumping into the water, bombs exploding and boats sinking everywhere. Unfortunately, the cameras were not rolling. The whole scene had to be reshot at great cost of time and money. The details of this incident are recalled in Andrew's book "It's a Wrap."

His last feature film Newsies, filmed in 1991, was about a newspaper delivery-boy's strike that took place in 1899. The film starred Christian Bale and Robert Duvall. Although the movie was a box-office flop, it gained a cult following and was turned into a stage musical at the Paper Mill Playhouse in New Jersey. It will move to Broadway for a limited run from March to June, 2012.

With Newsies in the can, Andrew decide that it was time to change his focus from TV and film production to teaching, fly-fishing, and woodworking.

== The Later Years (1996-2011) ==
With the movie business behind him, Andrew spent his time giving lectures to film students throughout the United States. This gave him the opportunity to write two books about the art and science of cinematography. With a knack for storytelling and a great imagination, Andrew wrote and published several works of fiction. The Rat Catcher was published in 2004. A Fight of No Consequence appeared in 2006 and concerns an ex-fighter trying for a comeback. His experiences in Japan while filming Shogun, let to the writing of the fictional book Banjin" When not lecturing or writing, Andrew used his time on various wood- and metal-working projects. When visiting his ranch in Montana, he often took advantage of the first-class fly-fishing streams and rivers in the area. Above all else, he enjoyed spending time with his wife, children and grandchildren. After a sudden illness diagnosed mid-year, he died at his home on October 7, 2011, in Bozeman, Montana, age 85.

== Filmography ==
=== Television ===
Year	Title	Director	Notes
1962-1963	Naked City	Denis Sanders; Robert Gist; Ralph Senensky; Harry Harris; William A. Graham; James Sheldon; Allen H. Miner	10 episodes
1964-1965	The Nurses	Gerald Mayer; Paul Bogart; James Sheldon; Stuart Rosenberg; Herschel Daugherty	6 episodes
1967	The Happeners	David Greene	Pilot
1967	Coronet Blue	Paul Bogart; Lamont Johnson; Sam Wanamaker; David Greene; David Pressman	12 episodes
1975	From Sea to Shining Sea	Lawrence Doheny	Episode "The Unwanted"

TV movies

Year	Title	Director	Notes
1966	The Beatles at Shea Stadium	Robert Precht (Uncredited)	Documentary film
1969	Teacher, Teacher	Fielder Cook	
1970	Black Water Gold	Alan Landsburg	
1973	The Man Without a Country	Delbert Mann	
1978	Hunters of the Reef	Alexander Singer	
1980	Top of the Hill	Walter Grauman	
1981	Thin Ice	Paul Aaron	
1983	Love Is Forever	Hall Bartlett	
1991	209 Hamilton Drive	Mark Tinker	

Miniseries

Year	Title	Director
1978	The Dain Curse	E.W. Swackhamer
1980	Shōgun	Jerry London

=== Feature film ===
Year	Title	Director	Notes
1964	One Potato, Two Potato	Larry Peerce	
1966	You're a Big Boy Now	Francis Ford Coppola	
1968	The Night They Raided Minsky's	William Friedkin	
1969	Popi	Arthur Hiller	
1970	The Out-of-Towners	Arthur Hiller	
1970	Lovers and Other Strangers	Cy Howard	
1970	The Owl and the Pussycat	Herbert Ross	With Harry Stradling
1971	Jennifer on My Mind	Noel Black	
1972	To Find a Man	Buzz Kulik	
1973	Class of '44	Paul Bogart	
1976	Countdown at Kusini	Ossie Davis	
1977	Thieves	John Berry	With Arthur J. Ornitz
1978	Somebody Killed Her Husband	Lamont Johnson	With Ralf D. Bode
1979	The Warriors	Walter Hill	
1981	The Funhouse	Tobe Hooper	
1981	Southern Comfort	Walter Hill	
1982	I, the Jury	Richard T. Heffron	
1982	First Blood	Ted Kotcheff	
1984	Streets of Fire	Walter Hill	
1984	Thief of Hearts	Douglas Day Stewart	
1985	Remo Williams: The Adventure Begins	Guy Hamilton	
1986	Poltergeist II: The Other Side	Brian Gibson	
1987	Innerspace	Joe Dante	
1989	Star Trek V: The Final Frontier	William Shatner	
1990	Ghost Dad	Sidney Poitier	
1992	Newsies	Kenny Ortega	

== Accolades ==
Year	Award	Category	Title	Result
1973	Primetime Emmy Awards	Outstanding Cinematography for a Limited or Anthology Series or Movie	The Man Without a Country	Nominated
1980	Primetime Emmy Awards	Outstanding Cinematography for a Limited or Anthology Series or Movie	Shōgun	Nominated
