= Barbara Owen =

Barbara Owen may refer to:

- Barbara Owen (organist)
- Barbara Owen (EastEnders)

== See also ==
- Barbara Owens, American novelist
