= Cinematographer Style =

2006 documentary film

- DVD cover featuring a still of cinematographer Vittorio Storaro
- Directed by: Jon Fauer
- Screenplay by: Volker Bahnemann; Jon Fauer
- Story by: Jon Fauer; Volker Bahnemann
- Produced by: Jon Fauer
- Cinematography: Jeff Laszlo; Brian Heller; Jon Fauer
- Edited by: Matthew R. Blute
- Music by: Florian Schlagbauer; Thomas Schlagbauer; Christian Bischoff
- Production company: T-Stop Productions
- Distributed by: Docurama Films
- Release date: 2006
- Running time: 86 minutes
- Country: United States
- Language: English

Cinematographer Style is a 2006 American documentary film directed by Jon Fauer, ASC, about the art of cinematography. In the film, Fauer interviews 110 leading cinematographers from around the world, asking them about their influences and the origins of the style of their films.

== Interviewees ==
- Remi Adefarasin, BSC
- Russ Alsobrook, ASC
- Peter Anderson, ASC
- Howard Anderson III, ASC
- Howard Anderson, Jr., ASC
- Michael Ballhaus, ASC
- Dion Beebe, ASC, ACS
- Bill Bennett, ASC
- Gabriel Beristain, ASC, BSC
- Larry Bridges
- Jonathan Brown
- Stephen H. Burum, ASC
- Bill Butler, ASC
- Bobby Byrne, ASC
- Russell Carpenter, ASC
- James Chressanthis, ASC
- Peter Collister, ASC
- Jack Cooperman, ASC
- Ericson Core
- Richard P. Crudo, ASC
- Dean Cundey, ASC
- Oliver Curtis, BSC
- Allen Daviau, ASC
- Roger Deakins, ASC, BSC
- Peter Deming, ASC
- Caleb Deschanel, ASC
- Ron Dexter, ASC
- George Spiro Dibie, ASC
- Ernest Dickerson, ASC
- Bill Dill, ASC
- Richard Edlund, ASC
- Jon Fauer, ASC
- Don Fauntleroy, ASC
- Steven Fierberg, ASC
- William A. Fraker, ASC
- Michael Goi, ASC
- Stephen Goldblatt, ASC, BSC
- Jack Green, ASC
- Adam Greenberg, ASC
- Robbie Greenberg, ASC
- Henner Hofmann, ASC, AMC
- Ernie Holzman, ASC
- Gil Hubbs, ASC
- Judy Irola, ASC
- Mark Irwin, ASC, CSC
- Levie Isaacks, ASC
- Johnny Jensen, ASC
- Victor J. Kemper, ASC
- Francis Kenny, ASC
- Richard Kline, ASC
- Fred Koenekamp, ASC
- Laszlo Kovacs, ASC
- Ellen Kuras, ASC
- Jacek Laskus, ASC
- Andrew Laszlo, ASC
- Denis Lenoir, ASC
- Matthew F. Leonetti, ASC
- Peter Levy, ASC
- Matthew Libatique, ASC
- Stephen Lighthill, ASC
- Walter Lindenlaub, ASC
- Bruce Logan, ASC
- Julio Macat, ASC
- Isidore Mankofsky, ASC
- Chris Manley
- Steve Mason, ASC, ACS
- Clark Mathis
- Donald McCuaig, ASC, CSC
- Robert McLachlan, ASC, CSC
- Charles Minsky, ASC
- Donald M. Morgan, ASC
- Kramer Morgenthau
- M. David Mullen, ASC
- Fred Murphy, ASC
- Hiro Narita, ASC
- Sol Negrin, ASC
- Michael Negrin, ASC
- Daryn Okada, ASC
- Woody Omens, ASC
- Daniel Pearl, ASC
- Ferne Pearlstein
- Wally Pfister, ASC
- Bill Pope, ASC
- Steven Poster, ASC
- Robert Primes, ASC
- Anthony Richmond, ASC, BSC
- Owen Roizman, ASC
- Pete Romano
- Paul Ryan, ASC
- Nancy Schreiber, ASC
- John Schwartzman, ASC
- John Seale, ASC, ACS
- Dean Semler, ASC, ACS
- Michael Seresin, BSC
- Steven Shaw, ASC
- Newton Thomas Sigel, ASC
- Bradley B. Six, ASC
- Dante Spinotti, ASC, AIC
- Ueli Steiger, ASC
- Tom Stern
- Vittorio Storaro, ASC, AIC
- Rodney Taylor
- John Toll, ASC
- Kees Van Oostrum, ASC
- Amelia Vincent, ASC
- Haskell Wexler, ASC
- Gordon Willis, ASC
- Ralph Woolsey, ASC
- Robert Yeoman, ASC
- Vilmos Zsigmond, ASC

== See also ==
- Visions of Light – a 1993 documentary film about cinematography
