= Sorry, Right Number =

- Short story by Stephen King
- Country: United States
- Language: English
- Genres: Science fiction, Drama

Publication
- Published in: Tales from the Darkside (1st release), Nightmares & Dreamscapes
- Publication type: Television show (Aired: November 22, 1987)
- Media type: TV & Print (Paperback)

"Sorry, Right Number" is a teleplay written by author Stephen King for an episode of the horror anthology series Tales from the Darkside. It is the ninth episode of the fourth season. It was later included in King's 1993 short story collection Nightmares & Dreamscapes, and is the only such work that King has included in any of his anthologies. It appears in script format, and begins with an authors' guide for screenplays and abbreviations.

The Tales from the Darkside episode originally aired in 1987, and starred Deborah Harmon and Arthur Taxier as Katie and Bill Weiderman, with Rhonda Dotson as Katie's sister Dawn and Katherine Britton, Brandon Stewart and Nicole Huntington as the Weiderman children. It was later produced as a short film in 2005, directed and adapted by Brian Berkowitz. The cast included Darrin Stevens, Karla Droege, Michael Brady, Kimberly D'Armond, Karoline Striplin, and Barbara Weetman.

The title plays on the title of the radio play and film Sorry, Wrong Number.

== Plot summary ==
Katie Weiderman is talking to her sister on the phone one night. Her husband, Bill, a famous horror novel writer, is in his study trying to find inspiration for a new novel. Her children are arguing about whether or not to watch Spider's Kiss, a gory TV adaptation of Bill's earlier novel.

Katie receives a second phone call. The incoming call is a sobbing and traumatized caller who sputters, "Take... please take..." before the line goes dead. Katie immediately assumes the call came from her daughter Polly, who is away at boarding school, but a call to Polly proves otherwise. Katie also rules out her mother, but she cannot reach her sister Dawn. Katie and Bill rush over to Dawn's house; despite the appearance of forced entry, Dawn is all right and did not call. Assuming that someone must have dialed the wrong number, Katie forgets about the call. That night, Katie finds her husband slumped in his chair, dead from a heart attack. The story then jumps forward in time to Polly's wedding day, ten years to the day after Bill's death. Katie has remarried, but she still misses Bill. On the anniversary of Bill's death, Katie is in Bill's old office and she finds an old VHS tape of Spider's Kiss and puts it into the player. She is immediately overcome with grief as she recalls the events of ten years past. Dazed, she grabs the phone and dials her old phone number. She is startled when the phone is answered by herself ten years previously. She tries to warn her younger self of the tragedy that is about to happen, and tries to say, "Take him to the hospital! If you want him to live, take him to the hospital! He's going to have a heart attack!" In her state of shock, she is only able to say, "Take... please take...," before the line goes dead. She realizes the truth of what happened that night, and the episode ends with Katie sobbing over her lost opportunity to save her husband and a close-up shot of the ominous-looking telephone.

== Release ==
The episode is available on VHS as part of volume 4 of the Tales from the Darkside compilation, as well as part of the complete collection released on DVD on October 19, 2010.

== See also ==
- Strange loop
- Stephen King short fiction bibliography
- List of Tales from the Darkside episodes
