= John Drimmer =

John Drimmer is a psychologist as well as Founder/ Chief Trailblazer of HerosJourneyInteractive.com, the first interactive and self-guided version of the Hero's Journey. Before becoming a psychologist, he was a producer at 60 Minutes and the creator of many TV series and films.

== Early life, family and education ==
John Drimmer was born in New York City. He is the son of author and editor Frederick Drimmer.

He was educated at the University of Pennsylvania and Hamilton College, where he studied with writer-in-residence Alex Haley, author of Roots and the Autobiography of Malcolm X.

== Career ==
Dr Drimmer, who specializes in positive psychology, has taught at UCLA's David Geffin School of Medicine. In 2013 he founded the internet-based Hero's Journey Interactive. (Web address: herosjourneyinteractive.com)

The site uses immersive visuals, story, music, and guided meditation to guide users deep into their innermost feelings and understand their lives as a hero's journey. Research shows users report significant benefit.

Before becoming a psychologist, Drimmer worked as a documentary filmmaker and writer of both fictional and documentary films. Besides working as a producer for 60 Minutes, he received an Emmy Award for creating the series Intervention. He also won the Dupont-Columbia Award, the Writers Guild Foundation Award, the Telly Award, and the Aurora Award.

Drimmer wrote the screenplay for the feature film Iceman for Universal Studios, produced by Norman Jewison and directed by Fred Schepisi; Hero in the Family, which he wrote and produced for ABC/Disney; Battle in the Erogenous Zone, which he wrote, directed and produced for Showtime; and The Tear Collector, which he directed and wrote for Tales from the Darkside.

He splits his time between running Hero's Journey Interactive and his private practice as a psychologist.

== Personal life ==
Drimmer is married. He and his wife, Barbara Osborn, reside in Santa Monica, California. They have a daughter, Zoee.

== Filmography ==
=== As producer ===
- 1980 : 60 Minutes (TV series)
- 1986 : Hero in the Family (TV)
- 1992 : Battle in the Erogenous Zone (TV)
- 1999 : War Dogs: America's Forgotten Heroes (TV)
- 1999 : Medal of Honor (TV)
- 2000 : Without Warning (TV series)
- 2002 : Mysterious Worlds (TV series)
- 2002 : Travel Scams & Rip-Offs Revealed (TV series)
- 2004 : Forecast Earth
- 2003 : Critical Condition - Stories of the ER"
- 2003 : Coming Home (TV miniseries)
- 2003 : The Last Mission (TV)
- 2004 : Intervention (TV)
- 2004 : Expeditions to the Edge (TV series)
- 2004 : Shot from the Sky (TV)
- 2005 : Untold Stories of the ER (TV series)
- 2005 : History Hogs (TV)
- 2006 : Guardian Angels, MD (TV series)

=== As screenwriter ===
- 1984 : Iceman
- 1986 : Hero in the Family (TV)
- 1992 : Battle in the Erogenous Zone (TV)

=== As director ===
- 1984 : Tales from the Darkside (TV series)
- 1992 : Battle in the Erogenous Zone (TV)
