= The Beatles at Shea Stadium =

- Directed by: Robert H. Precht (uncredited)
- Produced by: Ed Sullivan Productions; NEMS Enterprises; Subafilms
- Starring: John Lennon; Paul McCartney; George Harrison; Ringo Starr; Ed Sullivan
- Cinematography: Andrew Laszlo
- Music by: The Beatles
- Release date: 1 March 1966 (BBC Television)
- Running time: 50 minutes
- Language: English

The Beatles at Shea Stadium is a fifty-minute-long documentary of the Beatles' concert at Shea Stadium in New York City on 15 August 1965, the highlight of the group's 1965 tour. The documentary was directed and produced by Bob Precht (under the Sullivan Productions banner), NEMS Enterprises (which owns the 1965 copyright), and the Beatles company Subafilms. The project, placed under the direction of manager of production operations M. Clay Adams, was filmed by a large crew led by cinematographer Andrew Laszlo. Fourteen cameras were used to capture the euphoria and mass hysteria that was Beatlemania in America in 1965. The documentary first aired on BBC1 on 1 March 1966. In West Germany, it aired on 2 August that year. It aired in the United States on ABC on 10 January 1967.

== History ==
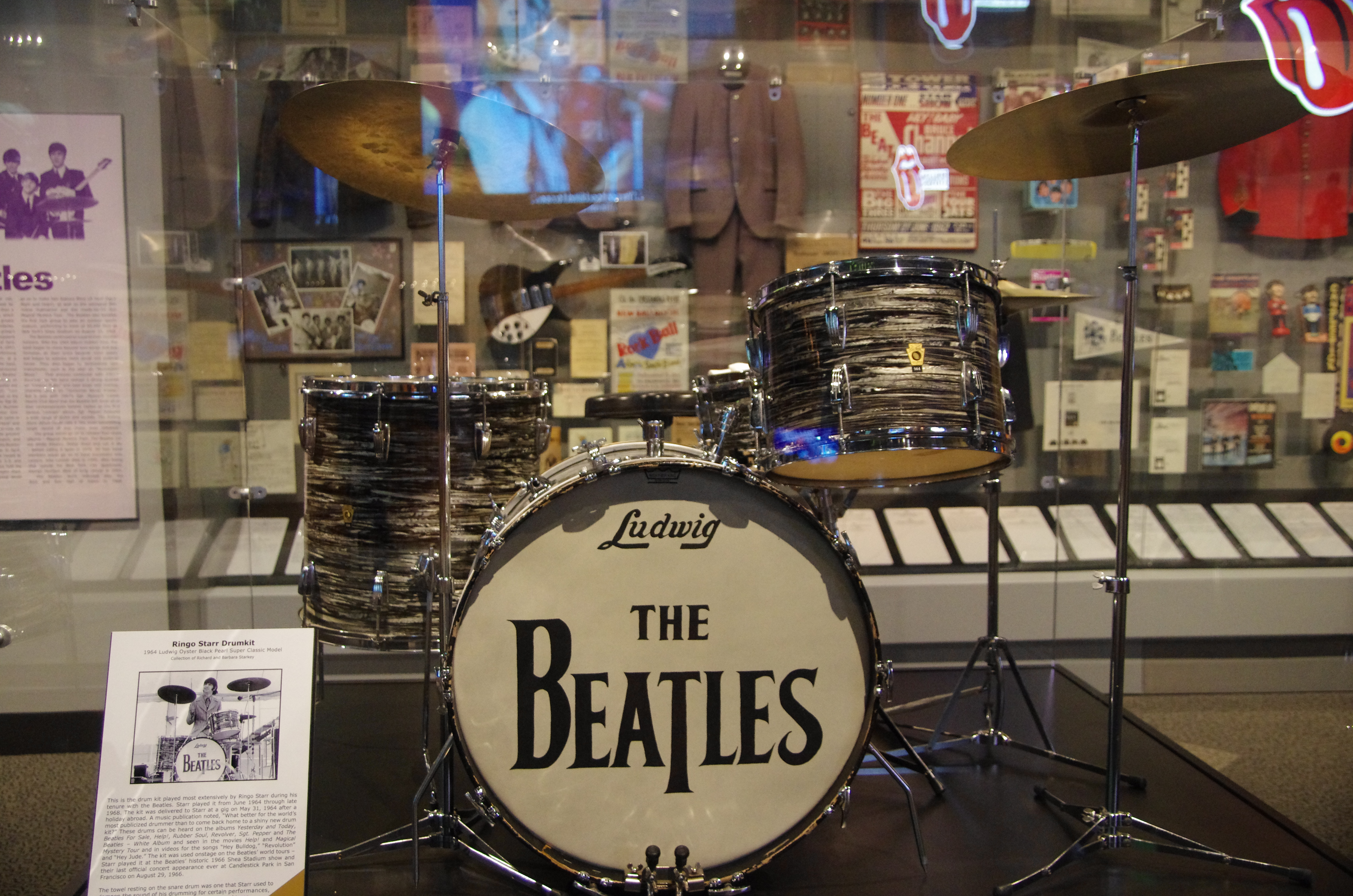
Ringo Starr's Ludwig drumkit, used at the Shea Stadium concert.

The film captures not only the concert, the attendance of which was 55,600, the largest Beatles concert up to that time, but also the events leading up to the concert, including the Beatles' helicopter ride from Manhattan to Flushing Meadows, their preparation in the dressing room (i.e. the visiting baseball team's locker) at Shea Stadium, and clips from the show's other acts, including Motown singer Brenda Holloway ("I Can't Help Myself (Sugar Pie Honey Bunch)"), King Curtis ("Soul Twist"), Sounds Incorporated ("Fingertips"), and Killer Joe Piro and The Discothèque Dancers ("It's Not Unusual", "Downtown", "Can't Buy Me Love"), managed by Jerry Weintraub. Murray the K, Neil Aspinall, Nat Weiss, with his step-son Shaun Weiss, Mal Evans, Brian Epstein, and announcer Cousin Brucie Morrow are also featured. Mick Jagger and Keith Richards were also in attendance. Marvin Gaye was introduced but did not perform. The Young Rascals and Cannibal & the Headhunters also performed but were not featured in the documentary. The concert had been presented by promoter Sid Bernstein. Television host Ed Sullivan introduced the band when they took the stage: "Now, ladies and gentlemen, honored by their country, decorated by their Queen, and loved here in America, here are The Beatles!"

The film is not a completely accurate representation of the actual concert performance. The songs "She's a Woman" and "Everybody's Trying to Be My Baby" are omitted from the film, likely from cutting the full performance down to fit the BBC's 50 minute time slot. (Audio of the latter song was released on The Beatles Anthology Volume 2 CD.) The audio for the songs that remained went through a heavy post-production process as well. Some songs were treated with overdubs, or even re-recorded entirely, by the Beatles at London's CTS Studios on 5 January 1966, to cover audio problems throughout the concert recording. In addition, the audio for "Twist and Shout" comes from a show at the Hollywood Bowl in 1964, and the audio for "Act Naturally" was simply replaced by the studio version of the song (released on the Help! LP in Britain and on the B-side of "Yesterday" in the US), sped up slightly and poorly edited to sync up to the film.

The Beatles at Shea Stadium was also shown in cinemas in the United States. The band's friend from their years in Hamburg, Klaus Voormann, designed the advertisements used to promote the film.

Although the film has not been officially available on DVD or VHS (except via a 1978 release by Media Home Entertainment that was successfully sued by Northern Songs), it has been widely available on the bootleg circuit for decades, including in a "raw audio" form that restores the original Shea Stadium audio track. A thirty-minute 4K restoration of the concert was about to be issued simultaneously with the release of the Ron Howard film The Beatles: Eight Days a Week on 15 September 2016, although added to the cinema showings of the film, it was absent in home video due to a lawsuit over the film rights. Apple Corps won the lawsuit in 2017.

The band played a further concert at Shea Stadium on 23 August 1966.

== Set list ==
All songs written by John Lennon and Paul McCartney, except where noted.

1. "Twist and Shout" (Phil Medley, Bert Russell)
2. "She's a Woman" (not included in film; audio played over end credits of 2016 release)
3. "I Feel Fine"
4. "Dizzy Miss Lizzy" (Larry Williams)
5. "Ticket to Ride"
6. "Everybody's Trying to Be My Baby" (Carl Perkins) (not included in film)
7. "Can't Buy Me Love"
8. "Baby's in Black"
9. "Act Naturally" (Voni Morrison, Johnny Russell)
10. "A Hard Day's Night"
11. "Help!"
12. "I'm Down"

== Legacy ==
Although the Beatles had played stadium concerts previously, the Shea concert was a milestone in popular musical history as the first major stadium concert.

In 1970, John Lennon recalled the show as a career highlight: "At Shea Stadium, I saw the top of the mountain." Ringo Starr described the concert in the 1995 documentary The Beatles Anthology, which featured extensive clips from the concert film: "What I remember most about the concert was that we were so far away from the audience. ... And screaming had become the thing to do. ... Everybody screamed. If you look at the footage, you can see how we reacted to the place. It was very big and very strange."

In 2008, Paul McCartney played the last concert at Shea Stadium with Billy Joel before the stadium was closed and demolished. The concert was documented in the film The Last Play at Shea. The following year, Paul McCartney played the song "I'm Down" at the inaugural concert for Citi Field, which replaced Shea. The DVD Good Evening New York City intersperses the 2009 performance with the original footage from 1965 concert.

== Sources ==
- The Beatles, The Beatles Anthology (San Francisco, CA: Chronicle Books, 2000).
- Harry Castleman & Walter J. Podrazik, All Together Now: The First Complete Beatles Discography (New York: Ballantine Books, 1976), p. 317.
- Mark Lewisohn, The Complete Beatles Chronicles (New York: Harmony Books, 1992), pp. 199–200.
- Miles, Barry (2001). The Beatles Diary Volume 1: The Beatles Years. London: Omnibus Press. ISBN 0-7119-8308-9.
- Schwensen, Dave. The Beatles at Shea: The Story Behind Their Greatest Concert (North Shore Publishing, 2013).
- Bob Spitz, The Beatles: The Biography (New York: Little, Brown and Company, 2005).
