= Harvey Jacobs =

American author

Harvey Jay Jacobs (January 7, 1930 – September 23, 2017) was an American author best known for science fiction and fantasy stories, very often with a humorous and/or satirical bent.

Born in New York City to Louis, a dentist, and Laura Jacobs, Harvey Jacobs received his BA from Syracuse University and attended Columbia University for graduate studies.

Jacobs contributed scripts to Tales from the Darkside and Monsters, both executive produced by George A. Romero. American Goliath, a fictionalized account of the Cardiff Giant hoax, was nominated for the World Fantasy Award for Best Novel in 1998.

Jacobs died September 23, 2017, of a bacterial infection after being diagnosed with cancer. Jacobs is survived by his son Adam and his granddaughter, Charlotte Emerson Jacobs. His wife Estelle died on March 27, 2021.

== Bibliography ==
=== Novels ===
- American Goliath
- Side Effects
- Beautiful Soup
- The Juror
- Summer On A Mountain of Spices
- The Egg of The Glak

=== Short fiction ===
Stories

Title	Year	First published	Reprinted/collected	Notes
Fish story	2001	"Fish story". F&SF. 100 (2): 61–74. Feb 2001.		
