= George Spiro Dibie =

American cinematographer (1932–2022)

George Spiro Dibie (November 15, 1931 – February 8, 2022) was a Palestinian-American cinematographer. He was nominated for twelve Emmy Awards and won five. His wins were in 1985 for Mr. Belvedere, in 1987 and 1991 for Growing Pains, in 1990 for Just the Ten of Us, and in 1995 for Sister, Sister.

== Biography ==
Dibie was born in 1931 in Jerusalem. During high school he was made a refugee by the Israeli Defense Force, who forcibly removed his parents and his siblings from their house. After becoming a refugee, he was hired by the United States Information Agency to translate reports in Jordan. His work for the agency led to a scholarship to study film at Los Angeles City College and the Pasadena Playhouse. After graduating in Dibie worked odd jobs and eventually moved into the film and television industry. In 1966, he co-founded Dibie-Dash Productions to produce and distribute documentaries and educational films.

Dibie's big break came in 1975 when he was hired to serve as director of photography for Barney Miller. He continued to work in cinematography, winning his first Emmy in 1985 for the Mr. Belvedere episode, "Strangers in the Night." In 1984, Dibie was elected second vice president of what became the International Cinematographers Guild and became president shortly thereafter. He was reelected again in 1985 and served as president of the chapter for 20 years.

It is estimated that he worked on between 1,500 and 2,000 hours of primetime sitcoms during his career and shot every Warner Bros. Pilor for multicamera series over ten years. Dibie was recognized with a 2008 American Society of Cinematographers Award for Television Career Achievement and a Society of Camera Operators Distinguished Service Award that same year.

Dibie died on February 8, 2022, at the age of 90.
