= Jon Fauer =

American cinematographer

- Education: Dartmouth College
- Occupations: Cinematographer; author
- Years active: 1980–present

Jon Fauer, A.S.C., is an American cinematographer and author known for his work on documentary films and commercials. His film credits include All the Right Moves (1983), Splash (1984), Cocktail (1988), and The Bonfire of the Vanities (1990). In 2006, he directed the documentary Cinematographer Style. Fauer is the publisher and editor of the website Film and Digital Times.

== Education ==
Fauer graduated from Dartmouth College in 1972.
