= Robert Precht =

American film and television producer (died 2023)

Robert H. Precht
- Born: Robert Henry Precht Jr. May 12, 1930; Douglas, Arizona, U.S.
- Died: November 26, 2023 (aged 93); Missoula, Montana, U.S.
- Occupations: Film and television producer
- Known for: Producer of The Ed Sullivan Show; director and producer of The Beatles at Shea Stadium

Robert H. Precht (May 12, 1930 – November 26, 2023) was an American film and television producer. He was a producer of The Ed Sullivan Show from 1960 to 1971. Precht was the director and producer of The Beatles at Shea Stadium concert film.

== Biography ==
Robert Henry Precht Jr. was born on May 12, 1930 in Douglas, Arizona.

He died on November 26, 2023 in Missoula, Montana at the age of 93 and was the son-in-law of Ed Sullivan.
