= Tales from the Darkside =

American horror anthology television series (1983–1988)

- Genre: Horror; Fantasy; Science fiction; Comedy drama; Thriller
- Created by: George A. Romero
- Narrated by: Paul Sparer
- Theme music composer: Donald Rubinstein; Erica Lindsay
- Country of origin: United States
- Original language: English
- No. of seasons: 4
- No. of episodes: 92 (2 unaired) (list of episodes)

Production
- Executive producers: George A. Romero; Richard P. Rubinstein; Jerry Golod
- Running time: 21–22 minutes
- Production companies: Laurel Entertainment; Jaygee Productions; Tribune Entertainment

Original release
- Network: Syndicated
- Release: October 29, 1983 – July 24, 1988

Related
- Monsters

Tales from the Darkside is an American horror anthology television series created by George A. Romero. A pilot episode written by Romero was first broadcast on October 29, 1983 after which the series was picked up for syndication, with the first season premiering on September 30, 1984. The show would run for a total of four seasons, until its cancelation on July 24, 1988 after a total of 90 episodes. An anthology feature film co-written by Romero and made of three episode-like segments, titled Tales from the Darkside: The Movie, would follow in 1990.

The series spans various genres of speculative fiction, including science fiction and fantasy in addition to horror, and many episodes have darkly comic elements.

== Production ==
The movie Creepshow was released in 1982. It was based on the EC horror comic books of the 1950s, such as Tales from the Crypt and The Vault of Horror. In light of the film's moderate success, its producer, Laurel Entertainment, decided to explore the potential for a television series based on the feature. However, Warner Bros. allegedly had the rights to some elements of Creepshow. Laurel chose to move forward with a series that omitted aspects of the movie that were owned by Warner Bros. The result was Tales from the Darkside, which explored the same themes as Creepshow, but discarded the framing device and other elements that were based directly on the comics.

Some episodes were adapted from the works of well-known authors, or written by the authors themselves. Stories or teleplays by Clive Barker, Harlan Ellison, Robert Bloch, Fredric Brown, David Gerrold, Ron Goulart, John D. MacDonald, Michael McDowell, Michael Bishop, Lois McMaster Bujold, John Cheever, Charles L. Grant, Barbara Owens, Frederik Pohl, Pamela Sargent, and Jule Selbo were used over the course of the series. Two episodes, "Word Processor of the Gods" and "Sorry, Right Number," were based on short stories by Stephen King. The latter was adapted for television by King himself.

Laurel announced a further 42 episodes to be produced in February 1986, which would bring the total of episodes to 90. In 1987, the International Alliance of Theatrical Stage Employees Local 52 and the National Association of Broadcast Employees and Technicians Local 15 joined together to combat non-union productions like Tales from the Darkside, stating that if the producers would not work with the unions, they would "be forced to deal with public union action."

=== Filming ===
Tales from the Darkside was a bi-coastal production, with some episodes being shot in Long Island City and others in Los Angeles. The 1985 season produced twelve episodes in each location.

Ernest Dickerson worked as one of several cinematographers on the series, from 1984 to 1986. Jon Fauer also worked as a cinematographer on the show. Gideon Porath served as the director of photography for the Los Angeles location, where episodes were filmed on 16 mm film, with many special effects being filmed in camera rather than added in post-production to prevent generation loss. Most episodes were filmed in less than four days.

=== Music ===
The opening and closing themes are performed by Donald Rubinstein, who co-wrote the music with Erica Lindsay. Ken Lauber was hired to write scores for the second season.

Various composers created the music for the individual episodes. Richard Einhorn wrote the music for "Fear of Floating" (season 2, episode 23) and "Florence Bravo" (season 3, episode 4). Jonathan Elias composed the music in the episode "The Cutty Black Sow" (season 4, episode 14).

John Harrison also composed music for the series that wasn't released until La-La Land Records included it as a bonus track on the American version of the score from Creepshow.

=== Opening and closing sequences ===
In the vein of previous anthology series The Twilight Zone and The Outer Limits, each episode opens with a montage and an unseen narrator. Several bucolic scenes are shown, followed by a slow pan through a forest filled with barren trees, which in turn yields to a fence-lined path through a meadow. This last shot fades into a black-and-white negative image as the series title appears.

Man lives in the sunlit world of what he believes to be reality. But ... there is, unseen by most, an underworld ... a place that is just as real, but not as brightly lit. A darkside.

The closing credits are displayed against the final, negative image of the opening.

The darkside is always there, waiting for us to enter, waiting to enter us. Until next time, try to enjoy the daylight.

The narration is performed by Paul Sparer, and was written by Romero.

The entire opening sequence of the show was filmed outside of Pittsburgh, Pennsylvania, not far from where George Romero filmed most of his movies in the 1970s and early 1980s. Romero was familiar with the area because he had lived there for many years and scouted numerous filming locations when he went into producing the Tales From the Darkside TV series. The bridge location used to be called Deihls Bridge, but is now known as Turner's Bridge. Some of the forest footage and the creek flowing over the rocks was filmed in Clear Creek State Forest just north of Pittsburgh. Other filming locations such as the farm, the fields, and the road with the old wooden fence were filmed in or around Boswell, Pennsylvania, and Ligonier, Pennsylvania. However, much of that area has changed dramatically since the opening was shot in 1983.

== Episodes ==
Cinefantastique printed in their July 1985 issue that the pilot episode was plagiarized from a 1952 Donald Duck short written by Ralph Wright, also titled Trick or Treat.

| Season | Episodes | Originally aired | |
| Season | Episodes | First aired | Last aired |
|---|---|---|---|
| Pilot | 1 | October 29, 1983 | October 29, 1983 |
| 1 | 23 | September 30, 1984 | August 4, 1985 |
| 2 | 24 | September 29, 1985 | July 13, 1986 |
| 3 | 22 | September 28, 1986 | May 17, 1987 |
| 4 | 20 | September 27, 1987 | July 24, 1988 |

=== Themes ===
The stories occasionally had a political focus, commenting on gentrification in an episode set in Port Huron, Michigan in 1985, and on the greed of "a Trump-like developer" in a 1987 episode. One episode stated that "politics is a show."

There were also concerns regarding new technology, depicted as a frightening unknown in the series.

== Broadcast and rights ==
The pilot episode was distributed by CBS.

In the series' initial run, LBS Communications, in conjunction with Tribune Entertainment, distributed Tales from the Darkside in first-run syndication through the barter deal method. It aired on both independent stations and local network affiliates, typically being shown in late night timeslots. Despite being a low budget syndicated show with little promotion, it managed to outperform higher profile network anthology shows from this period. These include Steven Spielberg's Amazing Stories and the 1985 Twilight Zone revival, which both debuted on major networks in primetime while Tales from the Darkside was airing in syndication.

Telepictures negotiated international broadcast rights for the series in 1984 at the MIPTV Media Market. Embassy Telecommunications negotiated foreign distribution in 1985 1986. In 1987, Lorimar-Telepictures gained foreign-market distribution rights, and took 90 episodes of Tales from the Darkside to the MIPTV Media Market.

Laurel Productions negotiated distribution rights with Worldvision Enterprises after Aaron Spelling Productions acquired Worldvision and Laurel in 1989. Paramount handled the theatrical distribution of the 1990 Tales from the Darkside movie. This was prior to Paramount inheriting the rights to the show through CBS's absorption of Spelling Productions.

In 2006, CBS Media Ventures signed an agreement with the Sci Fi Channel for exclusive rights to air Tales from the Darkside on cable as part of a package of properties that also included Star Trek: Enterprise. Tales had been a part of the channel's lineup since its inception in 1992. The broadcast rights to Tales were owned by CBS Studios in 2013.

Laurel filed a trademark application for the phrase "Tales from the Darkside" on May 7, 1987, which was granted on April 18, 1989. As of 2020, the trademark was listed as held by Spelling Entertainment LLC, with whom Laurel announced a merger in 1988.

== Home video ==
Overseas Filmgroup presented a 64-episode package of Tales from the Darkside at the American Film Market in 1987. ThrillerVideo and Worldvision Home Video handled VHS releases in the US, with Channel 5 Video distributing in the U.K. Laurel licensed Lorimar-Telepictures to handle home video distribution outside the U.S. in November 1987, in addition to the previous agreement regarding foreign-market television distribution.

In May 1997, the VHS tapes were being distributed in the U.S. under the Republic Entertainment Inc. label. In September 1997, Spelling announced that U.S. distribution for all of their home video titles would be handled through Paramount Home Video.

Each VHS tape included three episodes for the first seven volumes released. The fifth volume VHS release included closed captioning. Though these tapes were unrated in the U.S., at least the first two were rated "General, Parental Guidance" in Nova Scotia. VHS tapes released in Australia through RocVale Film were rated "M" and contained five episodes.

The VHS tapes were released with the episodes' original music.

At least one of the three-episode collections was also released on Betamax. Image Entertainment released four volumes on LaserDisc with digital monaural sound in constant linear velocity format in 1990.

Paramount Home Entertainment, through CBS Home Entertainment (sister company to Spelling Television, the successor to Laurel), released the series on DVD, beginning on February 10, 2009. The company re-released the complete series on Region 1 DVD in 2016.

DVD releases altered or omitted some of the original music. Paramount's first season DVD release included a synthesizer in the opening credits.

British company Revelation Films sublicensed it from CBS/Paramount, and released the entire series on DVD in Region 2 in 2013. In Region 4 (Australia) the show was released on DVD by CBS/Paramount, in association with local distributor Shock. The series has never been released on Blu-ray.

| Title | Episodes | Release dates | |
| Title | Episodes | Region 1 | Region 2 |
|---|---|---|---|
| The First Season | 24 | February 10, 2009 | November 21, 2011 |
| The Second Season | 24 | October 6, 2009 | February 20, 2012 |
| The Third Season | 22 | April 27, 2010 | May 7, 2012 |
| The Final Season | 22 (2 unaired) | October 19, 2010 | October 15, 2012 |
| The Complete Series | 92 (2 unaired) | September 6, 2016 | October 28, 2013 |

An audio commentary by Executive Producer George A. Romero on the pilot episode, "Trick or Treat," as well as two unaired eplsodes, "Akhbar's Daughter" and "Attic Suite," are cited on the cover of the DVD.

== Budget and revenue ==
CBS partially financed the pilot episode, but passed on purchasing Tales from the Darkside as a series. "Trick or Treat," the pilot, cost US$200,000 to produce, with the budget halved for the subsequent 23 episodes of the first season. When the first season was announced to be aired on Tribune Broadcasting stations, Variety reported that Tribune was expected to pay half the production costs for each episode in exchange for a portion of the ad sales.

The show often utilized only a single set or location throughout entire episodes, similar to a stage play. Special effects for one episode were only allotted a budget of US$188. Each episode aired five half-minute commercials, earning approximately US$20,000 each week for LBS Communications. With successful broadcast in 125 U.S. cities and 25 countries, the show received an increase in budget at the end of the first season to US$124,000 per episode.

Laurel's third quarter earnings for 1985–1986, US$117,780 on US$1,056,480 revenue, and year-to-date losses of US$211,337 on US$2,625,363 revenue were a substantial improvement for the company, which Laurel's vice president, Virginia McGuire, stated the success of Tales from the Darkside was directly responsible for. The 1984–1985 third quarter showed a loss of US$244,796 on a revenue of only US$198,031, with the year-to-date losses for that period at US$604,517 on a revenue of US$264,102.

LBS and Tribune Entertainment made an agreement to pay Laurel US$5,200,000 for the production and distribution costs for seasons three and four.

== Reception ==
=== Critical reviews ===
==== Syndication ====
A review in Variety of the pilot, "Trick or Treat," stated that the episode's writing was good for both adults and children. It also praised the acting, in particular Barnard Hughes, Frances Chaney, make-up artist Ed French who also played the devil, and Bill McNulty. The reviewer expected that CBS owned and operated stations would air the series expected to follow.

John J. O'Connor of The New York Times also reviewed the pilot, praising Hughes' performance and saying that the show "is not in the same league as Alfred Hitchcock Presents" but children should be entertained by it.

A review by of the first season Judith P. Harris in Cinefantastique only found the episode "Inside the Closet" to be interesting. Harris also expressed disappointment that Romero didn't seem to have any involvement beyond the pilot, and that the reason for the occult involvement with the characters of the episodes wasn't explained within every episode. Harris called this "laziness," further lambasting the screenwriters for "taking forever to get to the punchline." She found the comedic pieces to be "only slightly better" in execution, and stated that the endings to most of the episodes were dissatisfying, managing to remove the tension that had existed beforehand. Harris found screenwriter Haskell Barkin's explanation of the supernatural in "All a Clone By the Telephone" to be disappointing, as it consisted of repeating "alternate universe" to the viewer. She described the make-up from Ed French in "A Case of the Stubborns" as "especially poor," and only expressed praise for Charles Levin's performance in "Djinn, No Chaser."

Robin Bromley of Twilight Zone Magazine was impressed with the second season's story selection. Bromley did find the special effects "sometimes obvious."

Bill Warren of Twilight Zone Magazine commented very briefly on the third season, saying that the quality varied and the stories were "sometimes incoherent."

==== Home media ====
VideoHound rated the show with three of four stars. In a brief review of the various VHS volumes, Video Movie Guide stated that the only one worth watching was the first while noting that the low budget for the show decreases watchability. They rated volume one two of four stars.

About the first VHS release in Australia, Jim Murphy of The Age only said that the term 'creepy' "hardly applies" to Tales from the Darkside, calling it "pretty tame stuff." His colleague, Adrian Martin, stated that the tales tended to be "whimsical" and "anecdotal," but recommended the fourth episode of season four, "The Moth," praising its setting and themes, and stating that its "perversity" was preferable to Stephen King's "sickly sermons." Regarding the second VHS volume, Murphy commented that the tenth episode of season one, "Djinn, No Chaser" was his favorite, as it "put a new shine on the oldest of stories." Murphy also praised Allen Garfield's performance as the devil in "The Circus," the first episode of season three.

In reviewing the Region 1 DVD release of the first season, Paul Corupe of Rue Morgue found the sets disappointing, stating, "the show's meagre budget probably would have made Ed Wood blush." Corupe also pointed out the repeated theme of apprehension regarding technology just developing in the 1980s. Corupe wrote that the obvious low budget causes viewers to focus on the story, and noted that the "inconsistent story quality" meant the horror was sometimes lacking. He also noted that while nostalgia would make viewing palatable for some, exercising caution might be better for those unfamiliar with the series.

Ray Sidman of the Comics Buyer's Guide gave the Region 1 season 1 DVD release a 2.5 star rating, noting that the dialogue and acting are often "hokey" but offset by "spooky moments." Sidman found some episodes unwatchable, yet noted that others were worth watching more than once. Sidman also commented on the only extra included being George Romero's "meager commentary" for the pilot episode.

Greg Goodsell of Screem noted that the Region 1 season 1 DVD release offered only Romero's commentary on the pilot and previews of other CBS DVD releases as extras. There were three discs with eight episodes each. Goodsell gave a brief synopsis of each episode, with positive comments for "The New Man," "The Odds," "A Case of the Stubborns," "The Tear Collector," "If the Shoes Fit...," "Levitation," "Bigelow's Last Smoke," "Grandma's Last Wish," and "The False Prophet." He disliked "Mookie and Pookie," "Slippage," and "It All Comes Out in the Wash" entirely. While he liked Alice Ghostley's performance in "Anniersary Dinner," he described the story and that of the episode "Madness Room" as predictable. Goodsell compared the episode "Answer Me" to old ghost tales where much is left to audience interpretation.

A review of Revelation Films' first season Region 2 DVD release from Anton van Beek of Home Cinema Choice stated that the shows didn't "stand the test of time," describing the transfer to DVD as "hazy," and also noting the lack of extras.

==== Retrospective reviews ====
Eric Eisenberg of Cinema Blend analyzed the eighth episode of the first season, "The Word Processor of the Gods," comparing it to Stephen King's original. Eisenberg commented that McDowell's adaptation wasn't overly creative as it was nearly identical. Eisenberg did note that there were some alterations, but that these were a result of the change in medium, such as the omission of King's original descriptions of the parts of the word processor; and budgetary concerns, such as Lina's ballooning size. Eisenberg noted that the episode "captured the mood" of King's original.

In reviewing the second season Halloween episode, "Halloween Candy," Lisa Morton noted that it utilized monsters, bugs, and midnight to convey terror. Morton was impressed with the fact that the episode didn't try to soften the horror through comedy or tying it to action as so many Halloween television episodes have done. She did also note that the goblin "isn't always completely convincing."

A brief review of the series as a whole by Matthew Rettenmund stated Tales from the Darkside was the best of the 80s horror anthologies due to being both "gross" and "campy." Another such brief review of the whole series in The Psychotronic Video Guide stated that some of the episodes were "silly" with "weak scripts."

=== Viewership ===
The pilot episode brought in 18 percent viewership in New York City, 16 percent in Los Angeles, 22 percent in Chicago, 16 percent in Philadelphia, and 27 percent in Detroit. By October 14, 1984, the series had a 6.3 Nielsen rating nationally.

The series' Sunday episodes secured nearly 20 percent of viewership in the 1 AM time slot by 1987.

=== Accolades ===
| Year | Award | Category | Nominee | Result | Ref. |
|---|---|---|---|---|---|
| 1987 | Young Artist Awards | Exceptional Performance by a Young Actor, Guest Starring in a Television, Comedy or Drama Series | Scooter Stevens | Nominated | |
| 1987 | Young Artist Awards | Exceptional Performance by a Young Actress, Guest Starring in a Television, Comedy or Drama Series | Tanya Fenmore | Nominated | |
| 1988 | Writers Guild of America Awards | Anthology Episode/Single Program | John Harrison (as John Sutherland); for season 3, episode 17: "Everybody Needs a Little Love" | Nominated | |

== Subsequent series and movie ==
Tales from the Darkside executive producer Richard P. Rubinstein and his company Laurel would go on to make the horror anthology series Monsters, which premiered in 1988 and ran for three seasons, as well as Tales from the Darkside: The Movie, which was released theatrically in 1990. A sequel to the film was announced, with the script to be written by McDowell and Gahan Wilson, but was put on indefinite hold in 1992.

In November 2013, it was reported that Joe Hill, Alex Kurtzman, and Roberto Orci were developing a reboot of the series for The CW, with CBS Television Studios. Heather Kadin, Mitch Galin and Jerry Golod were listed as executive producing for CBS.

In 2014, Hill said that he would serve as creative director and guide the show.

In February 2015, The CW gave the reboot a pilot order. Originally conceived as a half-hour summer 2015 series, it was changed for episodes to be an hour each. Bradley Buecker directed the pilot. Kris Lemche was cast as the only recurring character, Newman.

Despite Hill's excitement over the completed filming in April 2015, The CW did not pick up the series. It then was offered to other networks unsuccessfully.

== In other media ==
The book Tales from the Darkside: Volume One, published in 1988, consisted of stories and episode novelizations.

Scripts written by Hill for the proposed reboot were adapted into a four-issue comic book series, illustrated by Gabriel Rodriguez and published in June 2016, followed by a collection of scripts in book form, illustrated by Charles Paul Wilson III, published in October 2016. Both the comics and the book were released by IDW Publishing.

A review of the first issue of the comic series in Rue Morgue noted that both the exposition at the beginning and the limit of twenty pages negatively impacted the tale. Svetlana Fedotov of Fangoria, however, said that the story took advantage of the new medium. She compared it to a morality tale in its handling of themes, but noted Hill's original expression as well as how the story addresses a contemporary issue much the way the original Tales do. She also praised Rodriguez's artwork and how he created both a personal and a broader terror.

=== Used by others ===
A review of the first issue of Sci-Fi and Fantasy Illustrated in 2010 stated that the story "borrows thematically and literally" from several other properties, including Tales from the Darkside season 3, episode 17: "Everybody Needs a Little Love," which was itself an adaptation.

== See also ==
- 1984 in television
- Tales from the Crypt (TV series)
- Are You Afraid of the Dark?
- Goosebumps (1995 TV series)

== Sources ==
- "Cable & Homevideo Briefs". Daily Variety. Vol. 216, no. 54. August 21, 1987. p. 22.
- "Choice Cuts". HorrorHound. No. 15. January 2009 – via Internet Archive.
- "Choice Cuts". HorrorHound. No. 19. September 2009 – via Internet Archive.
- "Choice Cuts". HorrorHound. No. 22. March 2010 – via Internet Archive.
- "The CW". The Hollywood Reporter. Vol. 461, no. 6. February 20, 2015. p. 21. Gale A402478206.
- "Dead Pilots Walking: Nets Fight for Leftovers". Variety. June 2, 2015. p. 14.
- "Digital Debuts". The Phantom of the Movies' Videoscope. Vol. 25, no. 100. Fall 2016. p. 63. ISSN 1083-2920.
- "Eighth Annual Youth in Film Awards: 1985–1986". Young Artist Awards. 1986. Archived from the original on April 3, 2011.
- "'Enterprise' in Sci Fi fleet". The Hollywood Reporter. Vol. 395, no. 27. August 3, 2006. p. 4. Gale A151054350.
- "Expand your horizons with Tales from the Darkside". Previews. No. 331. April 2016. p. 23.
- "King au Futur" [King in the Future]. Mad Movies: Ciné-Fantastique (in French). No. 80. November 1992. p. 31. ISSN 0338-6791 – via Internet Archive.
- "Laurel Ent. Plans Pair Of Half-Hr. Pilots". Daily Variety. Vol. 210, no. 55. February 25, 1986. p. 34. ISSN 0011-5509.
- "Laurel Revenues Up For 3d-Qtr., 9-Month Frames". Variety. Vol. 318, no. 4. February 20, 1985. p. 3.
- "LBS Sets September Launch for 'Darkside' Series". Daily Variety. Vol. 202, no. 49. February 14, 1984. p. 8. ISSN 0011-5509.
- "Music Series A Real Eyecatcher, Firstrun Tuners Beat Drums in Frisco". Variety. Vol. 314, no. 2. February 8, 1984. p. 118.
- "New Series Top MIP Menus From L.A.-Based Distributors". Variety. Vol. 326, no. 12. April 15, 1987. pp. 60, 138.
- Nova Scotia film and video catalogue, 1986 to 1989. Amusements Regulation (Report). Department of Consumer Affairs. 1990 – via Internet Archive.
- Official Gazette of the United States Patent and Trademark Office: Trademarks (Report). Vol. 1104. U.S. Department of Commerce. July 11, 1989.
- "Overseas Filmgroup Reps 'Darkside' Pack". Variety. Vol. 326, no. 5. February 25, 1987. p. 125.
- "Paramount home entertainment". Home Media Magazine. Vol. 32, no. 41. October 11, 2010. p. 14. Gale A240918050.
- "Paramount to release 'Tales From Darkside'". Variety. Vol. 37, no. 10. December 13, 1989. p. 21. ISSN 0042-2738.
- "The Producers of Pet Sematary and Tales From the Darkside the Movie Are in Milan October 22–25th". Variety. Vol. 341, no. 1. October 15, 1990. p. 23.
- "Quick Cuts". Rue Morgue. No. 169. August 2016. p. 47. ISSN 1481-1103 – via Internet Archive.
- "Seen on screen: there are a heck of a lot of triple-A DVD releases coming up in the next few months...". Music Week. September 21, 2012. p. 40. Gale A324759067.
- "Short Takes". Daily Variety. Vol. 215, no. 6. March 13, 1987. p. 2. ISSN 0011-5509.
- "Tales From the Darkside". Starburst. Vol. 7, no. 7. April 1985. pp. 15–22.
- "Tales From the Darkside: Scripts by Joe Hill". Previews. No. 335. August 2016. p. 173.
- "'Tales' Ratings Soar". Variety. Vol. 317, no. 2. November 7, 1984. p. 63.
- "Television and Radio Briefs". Daily Variety. Vol. 214, no. 5. December 12, 1986. p. 44. ISSN 0011-5509.
- Trademark: Wordmark "Tales from the Darkside", U.S. Trademark 73,659,817
- "Television and Radio Briefs". Variety. Vol. 208, no. 6. June 13, 1985. p. 10.
- "TV Fantastique". L'Écran fantastique. No. 38. October 1983. p. 15 – via Internet Archive.
- "TV merger: GAB grows still more". TV World. Vol. 11, no. 8. October 1988. pp. 53–4. ISSN 0142-7466 – via Internet Archive.
- "U.S. Syndicators at Monte Carlo". Variety. Vol. 318, no. 2. February 6, 1985. p. 48.
- "Writers Guild TV Nominees". Los Angeles Times. March 4, 1988. Archived from the original on July 25, 2021.
- "The Youth in Film Nomination Committee Proudly Announced the Nominees for the Eighth Annual Youth in Film Awards 1985/86". Daily Variety. Vol. 213, no. 30. October 17, 1986. p. 19.
- Andreeva, Nellie (November 12, 2013). "CW Eyes 'Tales from the Darkside' Reboot With Alex Kurtzman, Bob Orci & Joe Hill". Deadline. Archived from the original on November 13, 2013.
- Andreeva, Nellie (February 2, 2015). "'Tales From the Darkside' Reboot, Julie Plec's 'Cordon' Get CW Pilot Orders". Deadline. Archived from the original on February 4, 2015.
- Andreeva, Nellie (March 4, 2015). "Kris Lemche To Star In 'Tales From The Darkside' CW Pilot". Deadline. Archived from the original on March 5, 2015.
- Andreeva, Nellie (May 8, 2015). "'Tales From the Darkside' Pilot Garners Interest From Cable, Digital". Deadline. Archived from the original on May 10, 2015.
- Bevard, Christopher (September 2022). "Gruesome". Rue Morgue. No. 208. pp. 48–52. ISSN 1481-1103.
- Blauner, Peter (March 16, 1987). "Yuppie Hell". New York. Vol. 20, no. 11. p. 22. ISSN 0028-7369.
- Bond, Jeff (February 1999). "Sci Fi's Greatest Hits". Film Score Monthly. Vol. 4, no. 2. pp. 36–7. ISSN 1077-4289.
- Bromley, Robin (February 1986). "TV's new anthologies: the shine, they bite, they laugh in the dark". Twilight Zone Magazine. Vol. 5, no. 6. pp. 54–5, 95. ISSN 0279-6090.
- Brown, Charles N.; Contento, William G. (1989). Science Fiction, Fantasy, & Horror: 1988 – A Comprehensive Bibliography of Books and Short Fiction Published in the English Language. Oakland, CA: Locus Press. p. 32. ISBN 0-9616629-6-4.
- Brown, Rich (July 20, 1992). "Sci-Fi unveils schedule for September debut". Broadcasting. Vol. 122, no. 30. p. 21. Gale A12506181.
- Bujold, Lois McMaster (2008). "A Conversation with Lois McMaster Bujold". In Carl, Lillian Stewart; Helfers, John (eds.). The Vorkogsigan Companion. Riverdale, NY: Tekno Books. pp. 31–61. ISBN 978-1-4165-5603-9. LCCN 2008032556.
- Champlin, Charles (1997). Greenberg, Mark; Himmel, Eric; Tsutsumi, Rachel (eds.). George Lucas: The Creative Impulse: Lucasfilm's First Twenty-Five Years. New York: Abrams Books. ISBN 0-8109-3580-5. LCCN 97-7634.
- Clayton, John (Summer 1986). "The Making of "Welcome Back Mr. Fox"". CineMagic. No. 33. pp. 36–7. ISSN 0090-3000 – via Internet Archive.
- Coffel, Chris (July 6, 2016). "'Friday the 13th: The Complete Series' and 'Tales from the Darkside: The Complete Series' Art Revealed". Bloody Disgusting.
- Cipriani, Casey (November 13, 2013). "The CW Plans a Reboot of George A. Romero Anthology Series 'Tales From The Darkside'". IndieWire.
- Cohn, Lawrence (November 16, 1989). "Following 'Sematary' Hit, Laurel Wraps 'Darkside' Horror Film". Daily Variety. Vol. 225, no. 53. p. 6. ISSN 0011-5509.
- Connors, Martin; Furtaw, Julia, eds. (1995). VideoHound's Golden Movie Retriever 1995. Detroit: Visible Ink Press. ISBN 0-8103-9135-X.
- Corupe, Paul (April 2009). "Big Names, Low Budgets (review)". Rue Morgue. No. 88. p. 45. ISSN 1481-1103 – via Internet Archive.
- Craddock, James; Burns, Tom; Tyrkus, Michael J., eds. (2007). The Video Source Book. Vol. 3 (38th ed.). Farmington Hills, MI: Thomson Gale. ISBN 978-1-4144-0631-2. ISSN 0748-0881.
- Craddock, James; Burns, Tom; Tyrkus, Michael J., eds. (2009). The Video Source Book. Vol. 6 (43rd ed.). Farmington Hills, MI: Thomson Gale. ISBN 978-1-4144-7235-5. ISSN 0748-0881.
- Craig, Christian (May 18, 2021). "Tales From The Darkside: 10 Episodes That Are Still Scary Today". Screen Rant.
- Crowell, Aaron (March 2010). "Composing Screams: The Sounds of the 80s Slashers". HorrorHound. No. 22. pp. 47–49.
- Dale, Arden (January 26, 1990). "The ARRI 35 Book". Backstage. Vol. 31, no. 4. p. 1. Gale A8335453.
- Dempsey, John (April 30, 1986). "MIP-TV Becomes Sellers' Market". Variety. Vol. 323, no. 1. p. 131.
- Dempsey, John (March 18, 1987). "Tribune 'Muscles' in on Distrib Barter, Suppliers Yield Natl. Ad Sales". Daily Variety. Vol. 326, no. 8. pp. 39, 68.
- Eisenberg, Eric (July 7, 2021). "Adapting Stephen King's Word Processor Of The Gods: Does The 1984 Tales From The Darkside Episode Need A Reboot?". Cinema Blend.
- Ellison, Susan (January 1991). "Hot Trends in the Ol' Town Tonight". Aboriginal Science Fiction. Vol. 5, no. 1. pp. 47–8. ISSN 0895-3198.
- Erickson, Hal (1989). Syndicated Television: The First Forty Years, 1947–1987. Jefferson, NC: McFarland & Company. ISBN 0-89950-410-8. LCCN 89-42583.
- Farber, Stephen (June 9, 1986). "Success of 'Tales From the Darkside'". The New York Times. p. C22. ISSN 0362-4331. Gale A176353867.
- Fauer, Jon (February 13, 1987). "Jon Fauer: good cinematography is technique, technology and tactics". Backstage (Interview). Vol. 28. Interviewed by Jim Pfeiffer. Gale A4685082.
- Fedotov, Svetlana (June 15, 2016). ""TALES FROM THE DARKSIDE #1" (Comic Book Review)". Fangoria. Archived from the original on June 16, 2016.
- Fitzpatrick, Eileen (September 6, 1997). "Spelling Ends Republic's Rentals; 'Hercules' On Hold". Billboard. Vol. 109, no. 36. p. 96 – via Google Books.
- Gagne, Paul R. (1987). The Zomies that Ate Pittsburgh: The Films of George A. Romero. New York: Dodd, Mead & Co. ISBN 0-396-08520-2. LCCN 86-29256.
- Galin, Mitchell; Allen, Tom, eds. (1988). Tales From the Darkside, Volume 1. New York: Berkley Books. ISBN 0-425-11095-8.
- Goodsell, Greg (2009). "Tales from the Darkside: A Highly Subjective Guide to the First Season". Screem. No. 18. pp. 43–4 – via Internet Archive.
- Gopen, Stuart (1993). Gopen's Guide to Closed Captioned Video. Framingham, MA: Caption Database Inc. ISBN 0-9635726-0-1. LCCN 93-90366.
- Grant, Charles L. (April 1987). "A Conversation with Charles L. Grant". Twilight Zone Magazine (Interview). Vol. 7, no. 1. Interviewed by Douglas Winter. pp. 33, 90–1. ISSN 0279-6090.
- Hanauer, Joan (April 8, 1989). "'Monsters' of the Week". UPI.
- Harris, Judith P. (July 1985). "Timid, one-note stories need padding to fill even thirty minutes (review)". Cinefantastique. Vol. 15, no. 3. pp. 44, 59 – via Internet Archive.
- Hibberd, James (November 12, 2013). "'Tales from the Darkside' reboot from Joe Hill in development at The CW". Entertainment Weekly. Archived from the original on February 23, 2014.
- Hill, Joe (August 2015). "blog-cody-williams asked: Hi Joe! I'm a big fan. I just wanted to ask when the seventh book of LOCKE & KEY (the one that will collect a series of one shots) will be out? Also, what is the current status of the TALES FROM THE DARKSIDE TV pilot?". Archived from the original on January 28, 2016 – via Tumblr.
- Howard, Carl (August 1985). "Hunting Lodge". Artitude. No. 7. p. 2 – via Internet Archive.
- Kaufman, Dave (April 29, 1985). "The Dark Side of Syndie". Daily Variety. Vol. 207, no. 39. p. 8.
- Kelly, Edie, ed. (December 1988). Standard & Poor's Stock Reports: Over the Counter, L–Q. New York: Standard & Poor's Corp. LCCN 78-183944.
- Kelly, Edie, ed. (March 1989). Standard & Poor's Stock Reports: Over the Counter, L–Q. New York: Standard & Poor's Corp. LCCN 78-183944.
- Kendall, Steven D. (1994). New Jack Cinema: Hollywood's African American Directors. Maryland: J. L. Denser, Inc. ISBN 0-9629513-1-5. LCCN 92-075983.
- Kennedy, Michael (August 30, 2020). "Every Stephen King & George Romero Collaboration". Screen Rant.
- King, Tappan (December 1986). "In the Twilight Zone: Turning Points". Twilight Zone Magazine. Vol. 6, no. 5. pp. 6–7. ISSN 0279-6090.
- King, Tappan (April 1987). "In the Twilight Zone: Needles and Pins". Twilight Zone Magazine. Vol. 7, no. 1. pp. 6–7. ISSN 0279-6090.
- Klein, Richard (November 16, 1982). "'Creepshow' No. 1 At L.A. B.O.; 'Blood' Is Bright 175G; 'E.T.,' 120 G; 'Bandits,' 90G". Daily Variety. Vol. 197, no. 52. p. 3.
- Klein, T.E.D. (Summer 1985). "From the Editor". Night Cry. Vol. 1, no. 2. pp. 6–7 – via Internet Archive.
- Loft (November 2, 1983). "Syndie TV Reviews: Tales from the Darkside (Trick or Treat)". Variety. Vol. 313, no. 1. p. 80.
- Loftus, Jack (April 18, 1984). "Minis Lure MIP to U.S. Block-Bookers, Yanks Scheme Over Euro TV". Variety. Vol. 314, no. 12. pp. 47, 187.
- Maddrey, Joseph (2004). Nightmares in Red, White, and Blue: The Evolution of the American Horror Film. Jefferson, NC: McFarland & Company. ISBN 0-7864-1860-5. LCCN 2004005811.
- Mangels, Andy (October 1992). "Comics on Screen". Wizard. Vol. 1, no. 14. pp. 26–31.
- Marill, Alvin H.; Napolitano, Peter, eds. (1996). Blockbuster Entertainment Guide to Television on Video. ISBN 0-671-52902-1.
- Martin, Adrian (May 27, 1993). "'The Player' is simply breathtaking". The Age. p. 22. Gale A296457635.
- Martin, Mick; Porter, Marsha, eds. (1991). Video Movie Guide 1992. New York: Ballantine Books. ISBN 0-345-37345-6. LCCN 91-92106.
- Meeker, Fred (1988). Distances: Between people; between people and their government; and between points on a map. Burlington, IA: Craftsman Press – via Internet Archive.
- Miska, Brad (April 16, 2015). "CW's "Tales From the Darkside" Pilot Has Joe Hill Jumping Up and Down!". Bloody Disgusting. Archived from the original on April 19, 2015.
- Miska, Brad (May 7, 2015). "CW Passes On "Tales From the Darkside" Series…". Bloody Disgusting. Archived from the original on May 9, 2015.
- Moore, Debi (May 14, 2016). "Joe Hill's Collected Tales from the Darkside Reboot Scripts Being Released in October". Dread Central.
- Moore, Matt (January 2009). "Video Invasion: Remembering the VHS Boom – Chapter Four: ThrillerVideo". HorrorHound. No. 15 – via Internet Archive.
- Morton, Lisa (2014). "Great Pumpkins and Ghost Hunters: Halloween on TV". In Chizmar, Richard; Morrish, Robert (eds.). October Dreams II. Baltimore: Cemetery Dance Publications. pp. 265–278. ISBN 978-1-58767-492-1.
- Muir, John Kenneth (2001). Terror Television: American Series 1970–1999. Jefferson, NC: McFarland & Company, Inc. Publishers. ISBN 0-7864-0890-1. LCCN 00-46457.
- Murphy, Jim (January 21, 1993). "D'Abo sinister, but not too scary". The Age. p. 14. Gale A296503692.
- Murphy, Jim (March 18, 1993). "Theatre fans will love 'Noises Off'". The Age. p. 18. Gale A296493911.
- O'Connor, John J. (October 28, 1983). "Mitchum as Killer". The New York Times. p. C26.
- Owens, Barbara (December 1992). "Teeny Ann". Ellery Queen's Mystery Magazine. p. 47.
- Pratt, Douglas (1992). The Laser Disc Video Companion Updated Edition: A guide to the high-end delivery system for home video. New York: New York Zoetrope. ISBN 0-918432-89-8. LCCN 91-67114.
- Putti, Evelyne, ed. (June 1989). "Monsters: La Télé Terreur". Vendredi 13 (in French). Translated by Carrazé, Alain. pp. 20–23 – via Internet Archive.
- Rettenmund, Matthew (1996). "Eighty Quintessentially 80s TV Shows". Totally Awesome 80s. New York: St Martin's Griffin. pp. 124–138. ISBN 0-312-14436-9. LCCN 96-6989.
- Riggs, Thomas, ed. (2010). Contemporary Theatre, Film and Television. Vol. 103. Detroit: Gale Cengage Learning. ISBN 978-1-4144-4615-8. ISSN 0749-064X. LCCN 84-649371.
- Robbins, Jim (May 8, 1987). "Rival N.Y. Prod'n Locals Team To Fight Non-Union Filming". Daily Variety. Vol. 215, no. 45. p. 2. ISSN 0011-5509.
- Romero, George (2011). "Fannish Inquisition: George Romero". SFX Presents Special Edition: Zombies: The Ultimate Guide (Interview). Interviewed by Jamie Graham. Future Publishing Ltd. pp. 56–61.
- Sagar, Jessica (June 4, 2021). "24 Shows Like Black Mirror to Get You Your Fix of Absurdity". Parade.
- Savini, Tom (August 1989). "Hear No Evil, See No Evil". Fear (Interview). No. 8. Interviewed by Stanley Wiater. ISSN 0954-8017 – via Internet Archive.
- Scala, Betsy (May 26, 1997). "Blockbuster tests direct marketing". Video Business. Vol. 17, no. 22. p. 1. Gale A19568378.
- Scapperotti, Dan (July 1985). "The pilot for TALES FROM THE DARKSIDE rips-off Walt Disney". Cinefantastique. Vol. 15, no. 3. p. 44 – via Internet Archive.
- Shields, G. (2015). Ready For Your Close Up? African Americans and Internationals in Cinema Who Are College Graduates (2nd ed.). Mustang, OK: Tate Publishing & Enterprises. ISBN 978-1-68164-616-9.
- Sidman, Ray (June 2009). "Tales from the Darkside: The First Season – Paramount Home Ent./CBS Home Ent". Comics Buyer's Guide. No. 1654. p. 60. ISSN 0745-4570.
- Stanley, John (1988). Revenge of the Creature Features Movie Guide. Illustrations: Davis, Kenn (3rd ed.). Pacifica, CA: Creatures at Large Press. ISBN 0-940064-04-9. LCCN 87-91426.
- Straczynski, J. Michael (May 1988). "Through the Lens – From the Fifth Dimension: The Twilight Zone Returns!". Aboriginal Science Fiction (Interview). Vol. 2, no. 4. Interviewed by Susan Ellison. pp. 48–51. ISSN 0895-3198.
- Strick, Philip (February 1992). "Tales From the Darkside: The Movie (review)". Sight and Sound. Vol. 1, no. 10. p. 57 – via Internet Archive.
- Truitt, Brian (February 19, 2016). "Exclusive: Joe Hill's 'Darkside' moves from TV to comics". USA Today.
- Turner, George (January 1986). "Telling Tales From the Darkside". American Cinematographer. Vol. 67, no. 1. pp. 28–32. ISSN 0002-7928.
- van Beek, Anton (February 2012). "Tales From the Darkside: Season 1". Home Cinema Choice. No. 203. AVTech Media Ltd. p. 100. ISSN 1359-6276.
- Vasquez Jr, Felix (October 14, 2020). ""Tales from the Darkside" Brought the Anthology Frights of "Creepshow" to the Small Screen [TV Terrors]". Bloody Disgusting.
- Warren, Bill (February 1987). "Twilight Zone Review 1986: TV". Twilight Zone Magazine. Vol. 6, no. 6. pp. 47, 49, 55. ISSN 0279-6090.
- Weiss, Brett (June 2010). "Sci-Fi and Fantasy Illustrated #1 (review)". Comics Buyer's Guide. p. 48. Gale A249462817.
- Weldon, Michael J. (1996). Van Gelder, Gordon (ed.). The Psychotronic Video Guide. New York: St Martin's Griffin. ISBN 0-312-13149-6. LCCN 95-17151.
- Wilmington, Michael (May 7, 1990). "Movie Review: 'Darkside' a Clever Cut Above Horror Fare". Los Angeles Times.
- Wong, Cary (September 2003). "Creepshow (1982)". Film Score Monthly. Vol. 8, no. 8. pp. 53–4. ISSN 1077-4289.
