= Jule Selbo =

American writer, producer, and professor

Jule Britt Selbo is an American screenwriter, playwright, author, producer and professor. She was born in Fargo, North Dakota. She is a Professor Emeritus in the Cinema and Television Arts Department at California State University, Fullerton and is a member of the WGA.

== Education ==
Selbo attended Southern Methodist University and obtained her B.F.A. She continued her educational path into graduate school and received her M.F.A. from the University of North Carolina and her Ph.D. from the University of Exeter for her work in Film Genre.

== Career ==
Selbo has worked with industry pioneers like George Lucas, Roland Joffe, Lauren Shuler-Donner, Michael Newell, Aaron Spelling and with all the major Hollywood Studios. She was involved in screenwriting and producing works in feature film, television, animated series and daytime dramas for Columbia Pictures, Paramount, Universal and HBO.

Selbo has written animated films for the Jim Henson Company and Walt Disney Studios, notably work on Ariel’s Beginning, Cinderella II and The Hunchback of Notre Dame II.

== Publications ==
Selbo's Dee Rommel Mystery Series' has garnered awards and literary nominations. The ten-part series takes place in Portland Maine and follows the investigations of Dee Rommel, a former policewoman and now a private investigator. The first book is 10 DAYS, A Dee Rommel Mystery,', it is followed by 9 DAYS, 8 DAYS, 7 DAYSand 6 DAYS. Selbo intends to work her way down to 1 DAY. Other novels include Find Me in Florence, Breaking Barriers, The Life of Laura Bassi and Dreams of Discovery, Based on the Life of John Cabot

Selbo has written books for screenwriters on screenwriting structure and film genre as well as on film history including Women Screenwriters: An International Guide and Film Genre for Screenwriters.

She was a co-editor of the Journal of Screenwriting (Intellect Press) 2008 to 2012.

She has also written for theatre with productions in New York, Los Angeles, Louisville and other theaters in the USA. In 2025, the world premiere of Mary Shelley, Year With No Summer, directed by Richard Camp, was presented at the Ojai Theatre in California.'

== Filmography ==
=== Producer ===
Year	Title	Credits	Notes
1989-1992	Life Goes On	Story Editor/Producer	5 episodes
1994-1995	Models Inc.	Supervising Producer	28 episodes
1995-1999	Melrose Place	Consulting Producer	24 episodes
1998-2001	Undressed	Executive Producer	130 episodes
2006	Beyond the Fence	Consulting Producer	Short

=== Writer ===
Year	Title	Notes
1985-1988	Tales From the Darkside	10 episodes
1988	Raising Miranda	1 episode
1988	Annie McGuire	1 episode
1989-1990	Monsters	3 episodes
1991	Prison Stories: Women on the Inside	Segment "3"
1991	The Flash	1 episode
1991	A Dancer	Short Film
1991	Hard Promises	Feature
1993	Johnny Bago	1 episodes
1993	The Young Indiana Jones Chronicles	6 episodes
1994	Hercules and the Amazon Women	
1994-1995	Models Inc.	5 episodes
1995	The Adventures of Young Indiana Jones: Treasure of the Peacock's Eye	
1996	Space: Above and Beyond	1 episode
1996	The Adventures of Sinbad	1 episode
1998-1999	Melrose Place	3 episodes
2000	The Adventures of Young Indiana Jones: My First Adventure	
2000	The Adventures of Young Indiana Jones: The Perils of Cupid	
2002	The Hunchback of Notre Dame II	
2002	Cinderella II: Dreams Come True	Segment “Tall Tail”
2008	The Adventures of Young Indiana Jones: Mystery of the Blues	
2008	The Little Mermaid: Ariel's Beginning	
2011	Pound Puppies	1 episode
