= Barbara Owens =

American novelist (1934–2008)

Barbara Owens (1934, Carrollton, Illinois – 2008, San Jose, California) was a psychological suspense writer.

Owens was the winner of the Mystery Writers of America Best Short Story Edgar Award for 1979 for her story "The Cloud Beneath The Eaves", which originally appeared in the January 1978 issue of Ellery Queen's Mystery Magazine. It was her first short story.

Her short story "The New Man" was the basis for the first episode of the TV series Tales from the Darkside.
