= Ioan Kalinderu =

Wallachian-Romanian jurist (1840 - 1913)

Ioan Lazăr Kalinderu
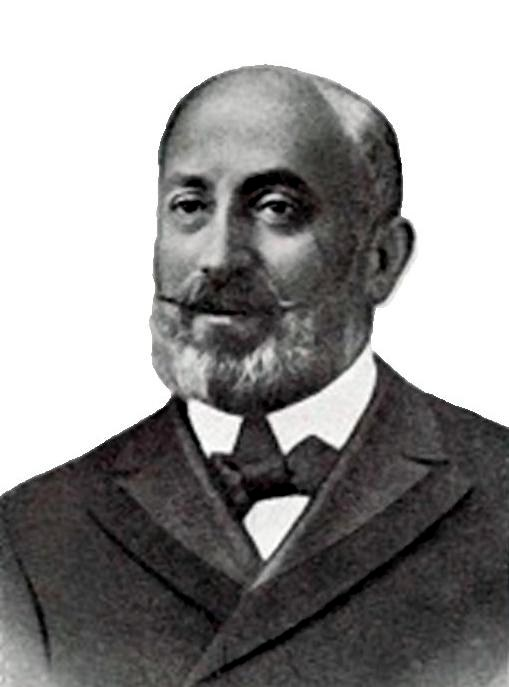
- Born: December 28, 1840; Bucharest, Wallachia
- Died: December 11, 1913 (aged 72)
- Other names: Ioan Calenderoglu, Iancu Kalinderu, Ioan Kelenderu, Ioanŭ Calenderu, Jean Kalindéro, Un Paysan du Danube

Academic background
- Influences: Spiru Haret, Julius Kühn, Gabriel Millet

Academic work
- School or tradition: Agrarianism
- Main interests: jurisprudence; agricultural science; forestry; home economics; pedagogy; classical antiquity; legal history; social history

Signature
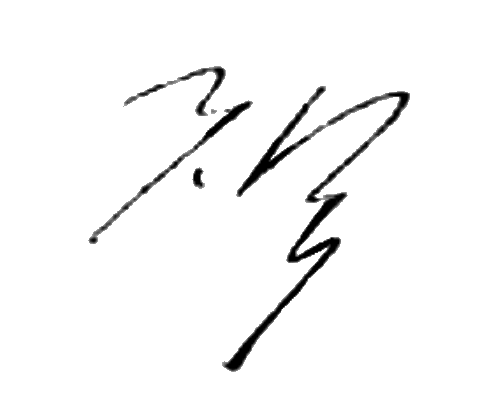

Ioan Lazăr Kalinderu (born Calenderoglu, also known as Iancu Kalinderu, Ioan Kelenderu, Ioanŭ Calenderu, or Jean Kalindéro; December 28 or 29, 1840 – December 11, 1913) was a Wallachian, later Romanian jurist and confidant of King Carol I, who served for thirty years as the administrator of crown domains, and for three years as president of the Romanian Academy. Educated in France, he was the son of a rich and influential Greek-Romanian banker, Lazăr Kalenderoglu, and the brother of physician Nicolae Kalinderu. Like them, he was a sympathizer of the National Liberal Party, with which he debuted in politics in the 1880s.

Kalideru was an expert in Roman law, but his attempts in the field, as well as his later studies in the history of Ancient Rome, are generally seen as minor contributions. His overall competence as an interpreter of law was questioned following his handling of the Strousberg Affair, although he served on the Court of Cassation and on international bodies of experts. Kalinderu stayed on as Carol's legal adviser, also helping him in direct negotiations with the National Liberal and Conservative political machines, and was several times considered for the office of Prime Minister.

As administrator for the crown, Kalinderu enacted his vision of rural improvement, setting up model farms and a cottage industry, promoting literacy and the arts, and encouraging entrepreneurship. He viewed these methods as a working alternative to land reform, defending property rights during and after the peasants' revolt of 1907. He was praised for his passion and dedication, but also criticized for the uncertainty of their outcome. In addition to his agrarian project and his social work, Kalinderu played a significant part in promoting mountaineering and modern forestry, set up the resort of Bușteni, and created his own art museum. A picturesque figure with eccentric customs, and often regarded as snobbish and servile, he became a stock character for the writers and cartoonists at Furnica magazine. His unfulfilled promise to donate his fortune to the public bled into a posthumous scandal which lasted into the interwar years.

== Biography ==
=== Origins and early life ===
Born in Bucharest on December 28 or 29, 1840, his father was Lazăr (Lazaros) Kalenderoglu (or Calenderoglu). Of possible Smyrniote origin, the family functioned as one of the largest banking and exporting institutions in Wallachia, and then in the United Principalities. Lazăr had risen into the ranks of Wallachia's boyar nobility: joining the Bucharest local government in 1838, 1844, and 1847, he was awarded the title of pitar, advancing to paharnic in the 1850s. His son would later falsely claim that the Kalenderoglus played a part in the Wallachian Revolution of 1848, although Lazăr is known to have held relevant positions in the National Party in 1857, briefly serving as its chairman alongside Constantin A. Kretzulescu. The last-ever tenant and tax collector of Predeal customs, Kalenderoglu had his estate in Olt County, outside Colonești, reduced during the land reform of 1864. Another of his estates, at Bălcești, was repurchased by the Bălcescu boyars. However, he still left Ioan the manor of Schitu-Greci.

Although a Wallachian native and relatively assimilated, Lazăr was sometimes regarded as an ethnic Turk, owing to his Turkish-sounding surname, or an Armenian. He identified as Greek-Romanian and, as late as 1879, was ktitor of an eponymous Greek Orthodox church in Bucharest. His fully assimilated son later barred the Greek colony from attending the church, and rededicated it to Romanian Orthodoxy. According to polemicist Alexandru Candiano-Popescu, the future Ioan Kalinderu was snobbish and "could not bear his descent from some obscure lineage"; he therefore claimed Eastern Roman descent, "having found a name that matched his own" in the books of Joseph von Hammer. Ioan and his brother Nicolae were educated in Greek, before graduating high school in Bucharest.

Ioan studied law at the University of Paris. Taking his license degree with a study of dowries in Roman law (1860), and earning a doctorate with a thesis on ex post facto laws (De la non-rétroactivité des lois, 1864), he returned home to take up positions as a judge, serving as the first president of Bucharest Tribunal. He then became a counselor with the Court of Cassation. From 1872, the Ministry of Justice employed him as an adviser for penal reform, alongside Vasile Boerescu, Nicolae Mandrea, Grigore Păucescu, Mihail Pherekyde and Grigore Triandafil. Boerescu referred to Kalinderu as "a man of the new world, with very progressive ideas, and an excellent jurisconsult." At the time, his family was involved with the liberal-radical movement. Brother Nicolae, a Paris-trained physician, became one of the founders of the National Liberal Party in 1875. The aged Kalenderoglu was founder of Creditul Rural, a credit union for the benefit of peasants, alongside major liberal figures.

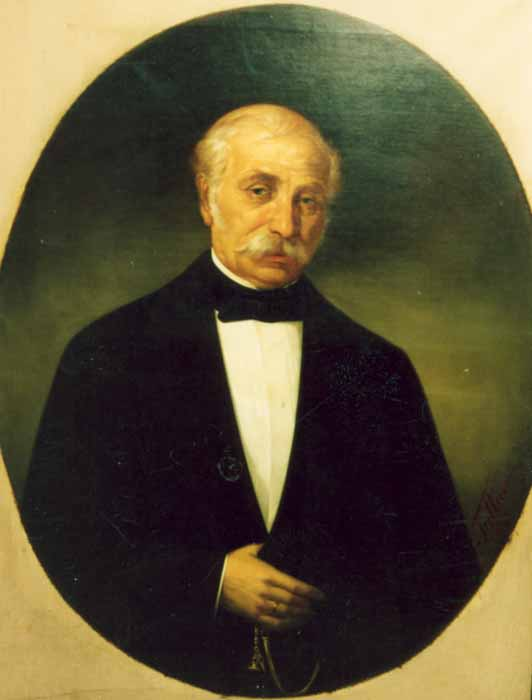
Lazăr Kalenderoglu, by Gheorghe Tattarescu

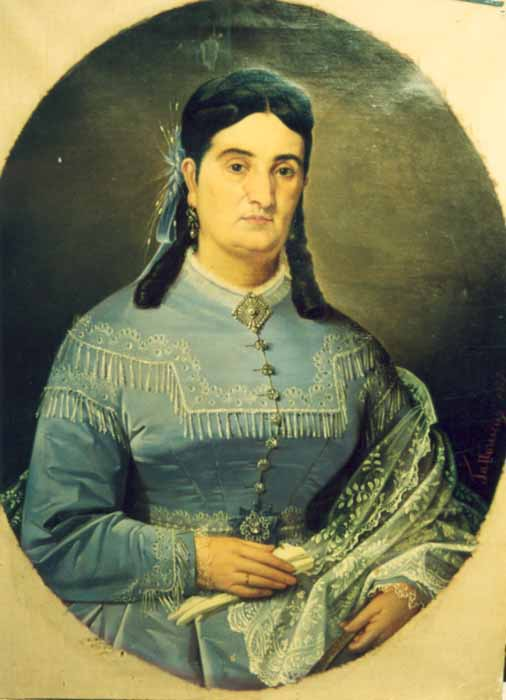
Kalenderoglu's wife, also by Tattarescu

In 1875, Ioan also joined the National Liberals in opposing the concession of the Predeal railway to the Englishman George Crawley; alongside party leaders Ion Brătianu and Dimitrie Sturdza, he created an investment firm that tried to compete with Crawley for the contract. Kalinderu advanced on the public scene following the Strousberg Affair, during which Romania purchased back her railways from the bankrupt Prussian investor B. H. Strousberg. In February 1880, he and Strudza were dispatched to Berlin to negotiate payment of Strousberg's government bonds with the Imperial German authorities. In April, Domnitor Carol I appointed him on the Princely Commission for the Administration of Railways, the embryonic Căile Ferate Române. The other members of this directorial triumvirate were Eugeniu Stătescu and Ștefan Fălcoianu. Kalinderu maintained his office in Berlin until 1882, representing the newly established Kingdom of Romania. In 1882, he published a French-language tome dealing specifically with the legal implications of the Strousberg Affair: De la compétence des tribunaux et particulièrernent des tribunaux prussiens dans toute contestation relative aux biens mobiliers qu'un état étranger peut posséder en Prusse.

As noted at the time by Titu Maiorescu, Kalinderu was responsible for placing his government in a humiliating position, and it was surprising that such a mission was entrusted to so unqualified an individual. Brătianu, who had taken over as Prime Minister, arrived in Berlin to personally supervise the negotiations, reportedly because the hastiness on the German side to seal off the deal "inspired in him grave disquietude". According to one account, he viewed Kalinderu as incompetent, arranging for Eugeniu Carada to replace him as the actual negotiator, in all but name. Nevertheless, Kalinderu's authority in international law was recognized following his employment by the Permanent Court of Arbitration. From 1888, he was also an associate member of the Institut de Droit International.

Kalinderu earned additional favors from Carol I, crowned King of Romania, who appointed him his adviser on legal and agricultural matters. For a while, he served as administrator of the state-owned forest and fields. In June 1884, Kalinderu was named the first administrator of crown domains, which had been set aside by organic law, resigning from his position at the railways company in December 1885. Owned by the state and managed by the House of Hohenzollern (through Kalinderu), the domains originally included twelve country estates and two mountains of the Southern Carpathians: Clăbucetul Taurului and Caraiman. During the first years of his new assignment, Kalinderu tried to pursue a parallel career in politics. He ran for Bucharest Council in 1886, second on the National Liberal list. He withdrew upon winning, citing his "many other engagements". During the election of 1888, "I. Calenderoglu" ran at Olt as an independent, but lost, collecting 55 of 165 votes. He eventually handled the purchase of Strousberg railways, negotiating a loan for 175 million lei in 1889. In 1891, following the resignation of a Conservative Party government under Gheorghe Manu, Carol reportedly proposed Kalinderu as Prime Minister of an independent cabinet. This maneuver was rejected by the opposition National Liberals—the refusal was instigated by a moribund Brătianu.

=== Academy presidency ===
By 1888, Kalinderu was elected a corresponding member of the Romanian Academy. As reported by Candiano-Popescu, this was a meritless advancement, done "without the God of literature having been made aware [of his existence]". Made titular in March 1893, Kalinderu became chairman of its Historical Section in 1895–1897, and again in 1907–1910. He also served as Academy president from 1904 to 1907. The administrator of the Ioan Oteteleșanu estate after winning the trial against his relatives in 1889, he donated most of it to the academy. The fund included 900 hectares of land, and ran at 4 million gold lei. During his tenure there, Kalinderu marginalized Ioan Slavici, who had criticized his management, and tried but failed to do the same with historian Radu Rosetti. He was also confronted with criticism from Duiliu Zamfirescu, who, in 1904, claimed that the academy was turning into an "asylum for the intellectually impaired."

Meanwhile, he continued to work as an envoy of the king. By 1899, with Romania hit by a major economic crisis, Kalinderu and Manu were sent abroad to negotiate loans—as Ornea notes, theirs was a "dilettante" adventure. Kalinderu also reported to his former Berlin colleague Sturdza, by then the National Liberal Prime Minister, that Carol had dismissed him, then negotiated a reunification of the Conservatives and Junimea defectors, prompted by the king's wish to have a stable government party. He had declined offers to replace Sturdza himself, favoring Theodor Rosetti or Ioan Lahovary for that position.

In 1896, Kalinderu restored the church on his own estate of Schitu-Greci, radically altering the overall design. He was particularly concerned with building and restoring Orthodox religious buildings on the king's domain, personally involved in restoring and refurbishing the church of Bălteni-Periș. He supervised model farms, wrote a textbook for crown agents, and ordered the founding of cultural societies, the first appearing on a domain in 1897. It published the eponymous "people's encyclopedic magazine", Albina ("The Bee"), appearing between October 1897 and 1916. Kalinderu was the head editor, with George Coșbuc, Petre Dulfu, and Petre Vasiliu-Năsturel serving as co-editors. His work in public literacy also led him to establish Steaua Association. Joined by Constantin Banu and Spiru Haret, and later by Barbu Știrbey and Alexandru Lapedatu, it had as its object the promotion of "moral, patriotic and useful publications", and the prevention, "by all lawful meas, of immoral writings and publications".

Kalinderu was also editor of Culture Ministry's newsletter, Buletinul Comisiunii Monumentelor Istorice, and of the forestry magazine, Revista Pădurilor, serving as chairman of the Historical Monuments Commission, the Progress in Forestry Society, and the Royal Geographical Society. He was also offered chairmanship of the Romanian Athenaeum, but regretfully declined, arguing that he was caught up in his agricultural work. Instead, he promised to bequeath a "handsome sum" of money to the Athenaeum upon his death. In 1906, following Sturdza's second fall from office, Kalinderu was again tipped as the likely Prime Minister.

Described by Zigu Ornea as a "pseudo-historian", Kalinderu authored "risible" studies on Roman hairstyles, which also drew much amusement from contemporaries. They were published in 1900–1901 as Portul barbeĭ și pĕruluĭ la Romanĭ ("Beard and Hair Styling among the Romans") and Portul perucilor și bărbieriĭ la Romanĭ ("Wigs and Barbers of the Romans"). Kalinderu's other publications have been characterized by Maiorescu as "compilations with no value". They include monographs on the praetorium ius (1885), on Roman municipal law and on the Byzantine Senate (both 1887), on the Twelve Tables (1888), on Roman vacationing (1895), on Augustus and his literary retinue (1897–1898), on Caesar's Civil War (1902), on clothing in ancient Rome (1903–1904), and on social life during the times of Pliny the Elder (1904). He also published an homage to Stephen the Great, medieval Prince of Moldavia, studies of succession to the Romanian throne, and an academy-sanctioned biography of Melchisedec Ștefănescu. In an 1888 polemical tract, Une poignée de vérités à nos prétendants ("A Fistful of Truths for Our Detractors"), Kalinderu and Alexandru Candiano-Popescu, using the shared pseudonym Un Paysan du Danube ("A Peasant of the Danube"), defended their work alongside the king.

=== Agrarian reformer ===
Kalinderu largely owed his ascent into prominent positions to his work at the crown domains and his influence with Carol I. However, his activity in agricultural and social improvement earned him respect. As early as 1898, Angelo de Gubernatis referred to his "powerful and positive work", calling Kalinderu "one of the most noble figures in today's Romania". Another visitor, André Bellessort, joked that the perpetually youthful "Mr. Kalindero" resembled "a rustic god", a patron of the farmers with "nitrogen eyes". Kalinderu's contributions to agricultural science and his activism, covered in a 1903 monograph by the agrarianist Vasile Kogălniceanu, were praised by the sociologists: Dimitrie Drăghicescu saw them as marked by an "entrepreneurial spirit, unrelenting in its activity"; Nicolae Mihăescu-Nigrim called Kalinderu "one of the country's most eminent economists" and an "indefatigable administrator". As chemist Amuliu Proca notes, Kalinderu turned the domains into an "institution for defeating poverty, a factor in educating and culturally improving the villages". It "set an example of what may be accomplished, in a short while, by a country that was taking major steps in her development."

As summarized by the official press of his time, he "put all his efforts into directing peasants toward the cottage industry", created "home economics classes and adult education courses", and "was the first to speak" at educational conferences. He established a dairy factory, as well as shops for weavers, ropemakers, wainwrights and woodturners, and showcased their products at the 1900 World's Fair. Following Julius Kühn, Kalinderu insisted that the precondition of a "rational economy" was good livestock, so he inaugurated a freely accessible breeding program, also providing tenants with cultivars, or with beekeeping and sericulture implements. He also reintroduced reforestation and forest farming where bad practices had affected the environment. Kalinderu held the notion that the Romanian peasant was miserable for being illiterate, and that "all it takes is a set of favorable circumstances for him to display [his] talents". The efforts to educate his tenants were conjugated with those of Steaua's Haret, by then National Liberal Minister of Education, providing young students with work experience and physical culture, as well as inculcating in them a patriotic awareness. A significant portion of his time was spent on teaching peasants to diversify their diet, including providing hired hands with daily rations of vegetables, meat and milk. This helped to prevent outbursts of pellagra.

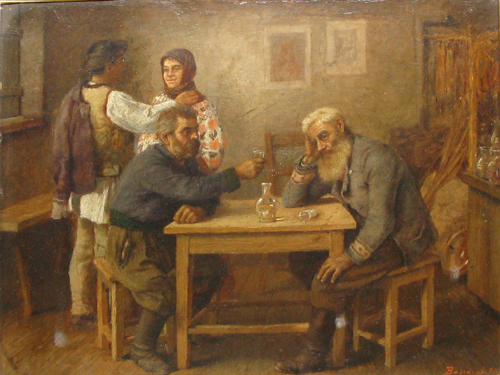
In the Tavern, 1907 painting by Ludovic Bassarab

In 1901, agronomist Constantin Sandu-Aldea acknowledged that there was a stark difference between "the mass of cultivators, who fall behind progress", and those living and working on crown lands. As he noted, the "intelligent and energetic" Kalinderu was managing his estate and his tenants backed by "all scientific data in modern agriculture." Modeling his effort on the Austrian colonization of Bosnia, Kalinderu financed research projects for his employees, sending many of them to study in Austria-Hungary. On crown estates, management was divided between networks of forestry engineers, agricultural engineers, and accountants, who decided working hours and met budgetary requirements; workers received social security, including disability insurance. These and other contracts excluded drunkards and unmarried couples, with a view to promoting a stringent moral code. However, his attempts to uproot alcoholism and promote personal hygiene had mixed results, according to the left-wing Mihail Sadoveanu, who noted, sarcastically, "true enough, these days taverns have been replaced by bathhouses and libraries." Likewise, a 1901 project to set up rural theaters was derided and parodied by Ion Luca Caragiale, in Moftul Român. Reportedly, his order to build model libraries on the domains was actively sabotaged by the local curators, who would not allow peasants to consult them, or even to set foot in the buildings.

Kalinderu took over his father's seat at Creditul Rural, which financed the cottage industry and, in 1906, was chaired by Sturdza. The institution was rocked by scandals between its Conservative and National Liberal managers—when Sturdza stepped down in March 1906, Kalinderu became his replacement. His belief in self-help and his defense of landed-property rights against another land reform were highlighted after the peasants' revolt of 1907, during which his own estate at Schitu-Greci was ransacked. At the Progress in Forestry Society, he condemned the peasants' belief that "the state has a duty to provide them with land", and insisted that the root cause of the revolt was their failure to accept modernity and practicality. As he noted at the time, "on the crown domains, [...] the peasants never rebelled, but quite the contrary, defended property against invaders."

Mediating between the Conservatives and the king, Kalinderu obtained guarantees against the reform, although he and the crown advocated "a credit union under the control of the state, permitting peasants to accumulate more land of their own." By then, he had resigned from his steering position at Creditul Rural, following an agreement with Dinu Brătianu, who replaced him. In 1908–1911, his Albina team also put out a weekly "social bulletin", providing Orthodox parsons and rural teachers with guidance in the field social work.

=== Art collector and courtier ===
Kalinderu's other ambitious ideas manifested themselves erratically, including a project for a girls' boarding school in Turnu Măgurele, the "Oteteleșanu Institute", which he launched without the academy's approval. He was also involved in the development of the Bușteni mountain resort, where he built a paper mill and a high school that today bears his name. He promoted ski, and a slope there is also named in his honor. His own estate increased by 1907, with the addition of 401 hectares at Seaca—leased out to the Predescu brothers—and other plots in Tecuci-Kalinderu. From July 1906 onward, his other pet project was art collecting, with the goal of setting up a museum at his villa on Vasile Sion Street, near the Cișmigiu Gardens. The house itself, designed by Ion D. Berindey, cost 2 million gold lei to build, and was lavishly furnished. The collection included Ancient Greek pottery and works of design alongside art by Donatello, Andrea del Verrocchio, Giovanni Paolo Panini, Théodore Géricault, Léon Bonnat, Auguste Raffet, and the complete collection of etchings by Piranesi. These were matched by a Romanian hall, with canvasses by Nicolae Grigorescu, Ștefan Luchian, Ion Andreescu, Camil Ressu, and various others.

The art world was skeptical of his tastes: Tudor Arghezi and Alexandru Lapedatu both noted that Kalinderu had amassed his objets without much discernment; later, art historian Petre Oprea concluded that Kalinderu was driven by "vainglory and a thirst for fame." Similarly, critic George Oprescu suggests that Ioan's taste in art was eclipsed by that of his physician brother Nicolae, who selected "all that is best" in the Kalinderu collection. According to the fellow collector Krikor Zambaccian: "dapper, distant and implacable, the Smyrniote was haughty and did not tolerate competition". Zambaccian found his rival overall "harmless", even though he noted an incident in which an angry Kalinderu "decapitated" a work of sculpture.

Kalideru's other eccentricities attracted attention in their own right. Seen by contemporaries and later historians as excessively vain and hence susceptible, he was decorated with the ribbons of numerous European countries, holding the Grand Cross of the Order of the Star of Romania, the Legion of Honour as Grand Officer, and, from 1903, the Grand Cordon of the Order of Osmanieh. In one of his charges, Arghezi claimed that Kalinderu, the "Man with Violet Eyes", was entirely alien to the nation he claimed to rescue, a "purulent flower on the heights of our national life." Lapedatu commented on his "wicked half-closed Oriental eyes", his "black mustache like that of Napoleon III", and his dress "in the English style, with wide pants, gray jacket, an enormous lapel flower and a tall gray hat". Constantin Argetoianu observed that although Kalinderu lacked all inclination toward sport or riding, he would go out every morning on a nag he could barely ride. Although this activity bored him, he would not have renounced it for anything, because he had read it was a habit of lords in London. Later, he became an ardent velocipedist, and was the only person with special permission to ride a velocipede in Cișmigiu.

As seen by Radu R. Rosetti, Kalinderu appears "sententious, ridiculous, but very much appreciated by the King". Reportedly, he worked for free at the crown domains, refusing to collect his salary: "The only rewards he desires are peasant blessings and his playing billiards with His Majesty." The king's appreciation was strictly contextual, a fact noticed by the politician Ion G. Duca: although Kalideru "entertained illusions" that he was personal friends with Carol, the latter "made sure to dispel it"; the courtier could be the king's "servant and useful instrument, but never his friend." Reportedly, Carol also ordered Kalinderu to admonish Crown Prince Ferdinand and Princess Marie for their lavish spending. The future Queen Marie was much amused by Kalinderu, describing him as "little, round, with a short beard and a pronounced Semitic nose; one of his eyes sparkled wickedly, showing an unusually sharp intelligence". She recalled a visit with him to Windsor Castle, where "it was truly amusing to see the short gentleman very pleased with himself, catching everything with his glimpse, weighing, judging, taking the measure of people and things, with that small, penetrating, almost wicked eye". Even when meeting Queen Victoria, his eye "roved throughout, as if he feared missing something". When he was shown the castle's art treasures, he observed them "with the superior air of a man in the know, of a man who was familiar with valuable collections".

=== Final years, death, and legacy ===
As noted by the queen, Kalinderu's "vain, self-satisfied appearance" became "a tireless temptation for caricaturists". During the nine years in which their activity overlapped, the magazine Furnica made him a buffoonish stock character in prose, poetry, and cartoons. Furnica's George Ranetti also circulated serious charges against Kalinderu, accusing him of having run over a child with his car, and implying that he had used his connections to avoid prosecution. During the peasants' revolt, Furnica published a cartoon showing Kalinderu as a personification of Cajolery, interposing himself between Carol and The Truth (personified by a tenant farmer); issues of that period were confiscated by the Ministry of Internal Affairs. Reportedly, Kalinderu himself was generally aware of the mockery, but pretended to be "inviolable", and even incited Ranetti by riding his horse to his office. However, Furnica gleefully reported, he lost his temper with the painter Ion Theodorescu-Sion, who had contributed a set of cartoons to the campaign. According to the magazine, this incident showed his limitations as an art patron.

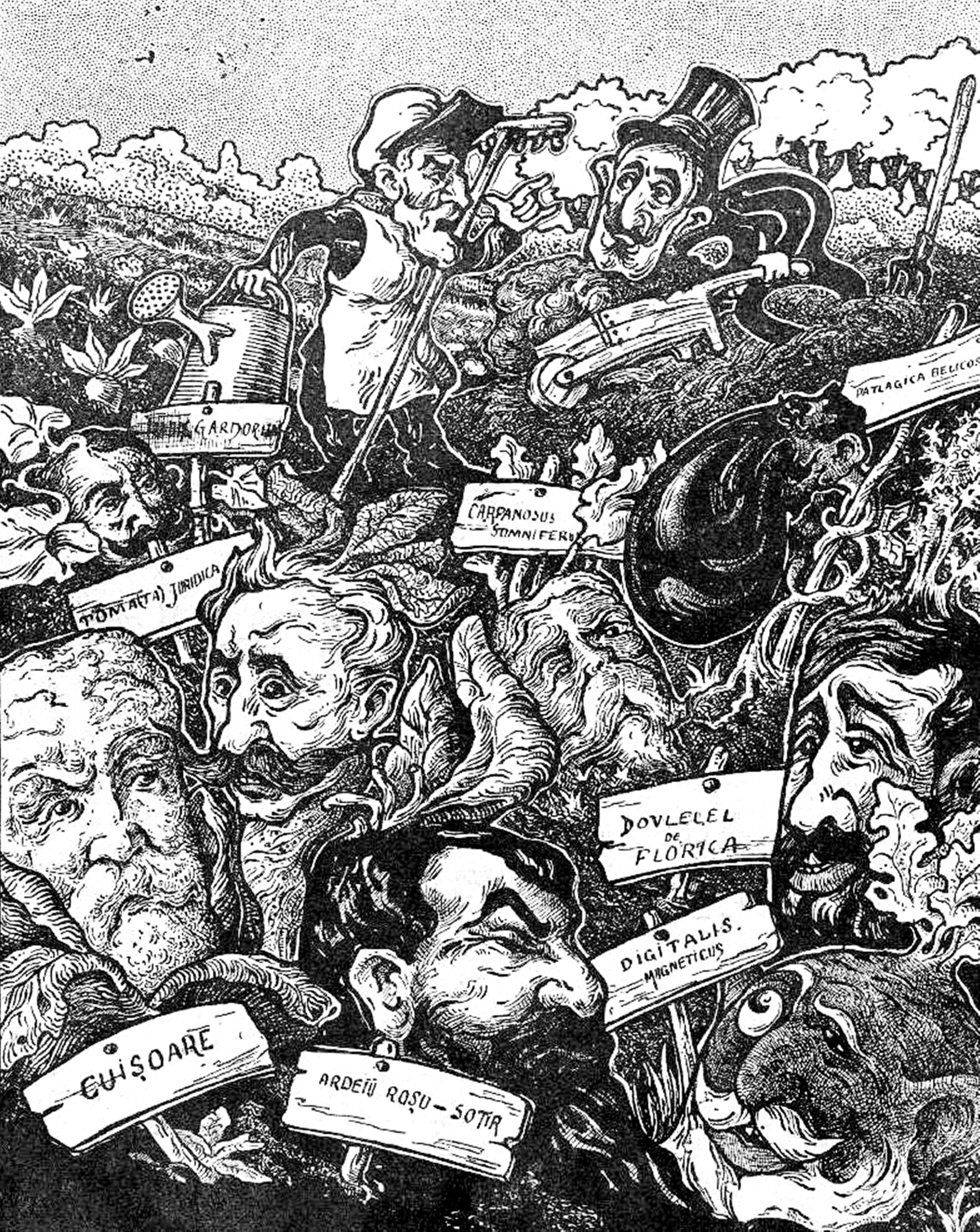
Carol I and Kalinderu as gardeners, reaping the vegetable-politicians; by Witold Rolla-Piekarski

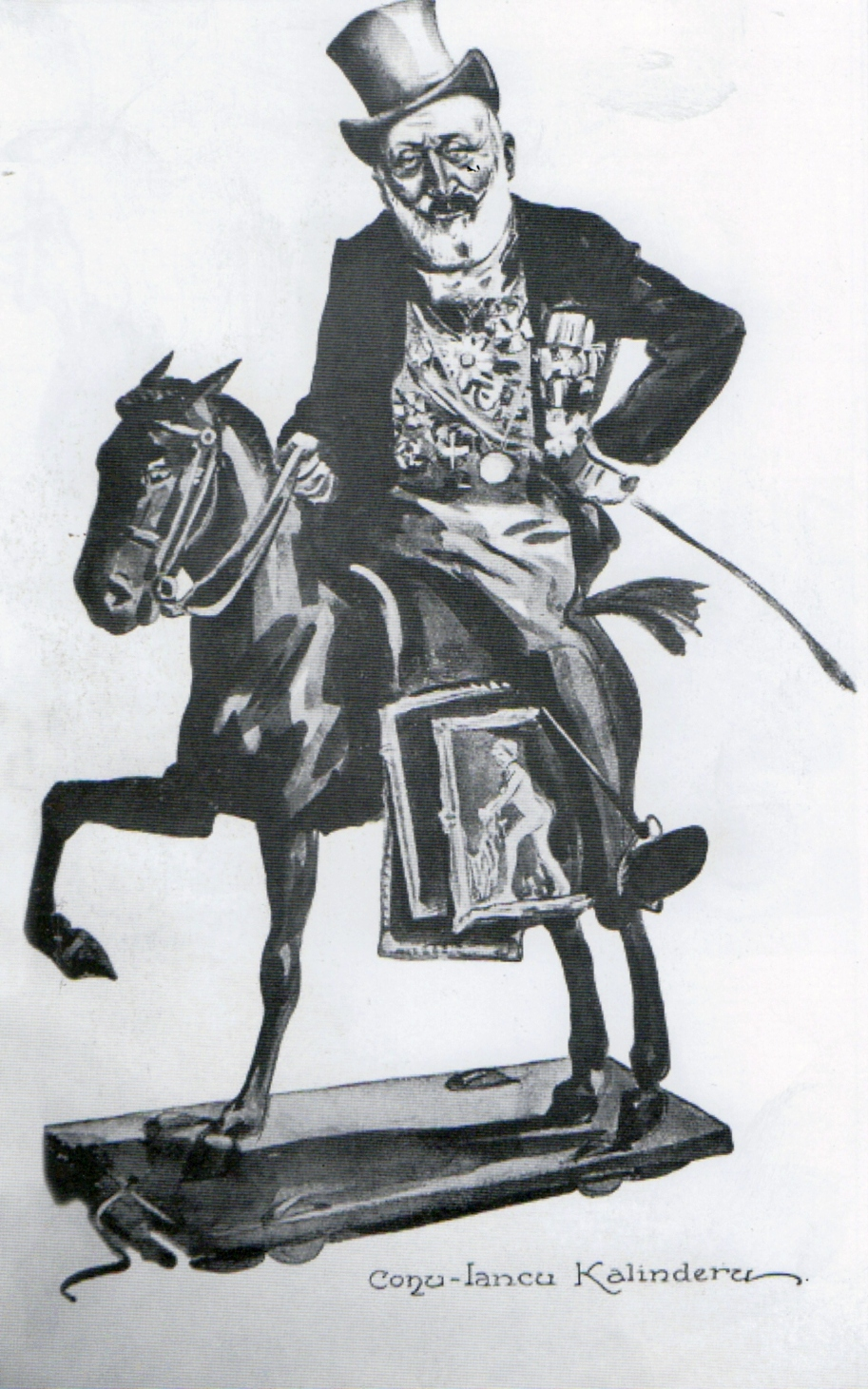
Kalinderu the horseman, by Nicolae Petrescu-Găină

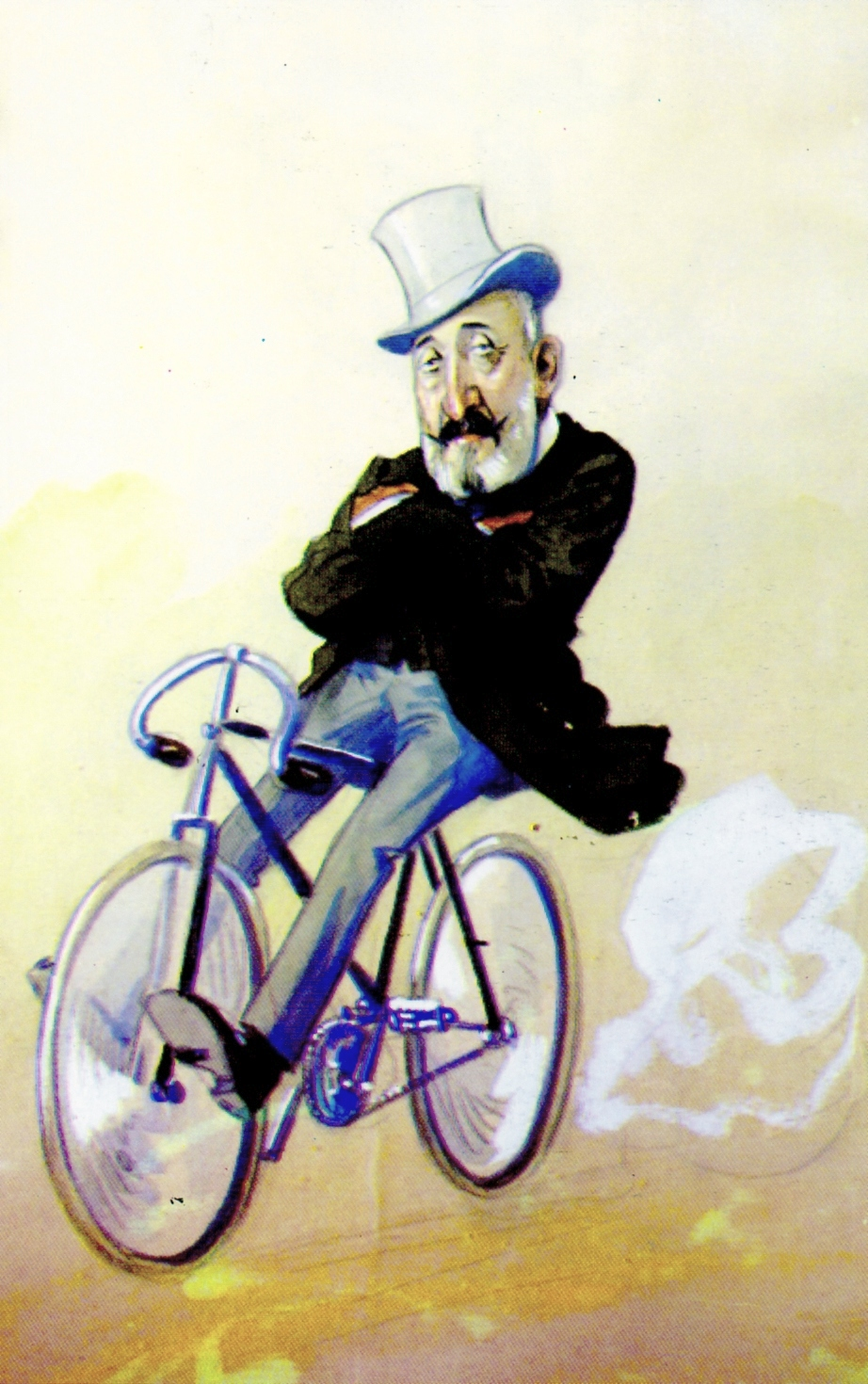
Kalinderu the velocipedist, also by Petrescu-Găină

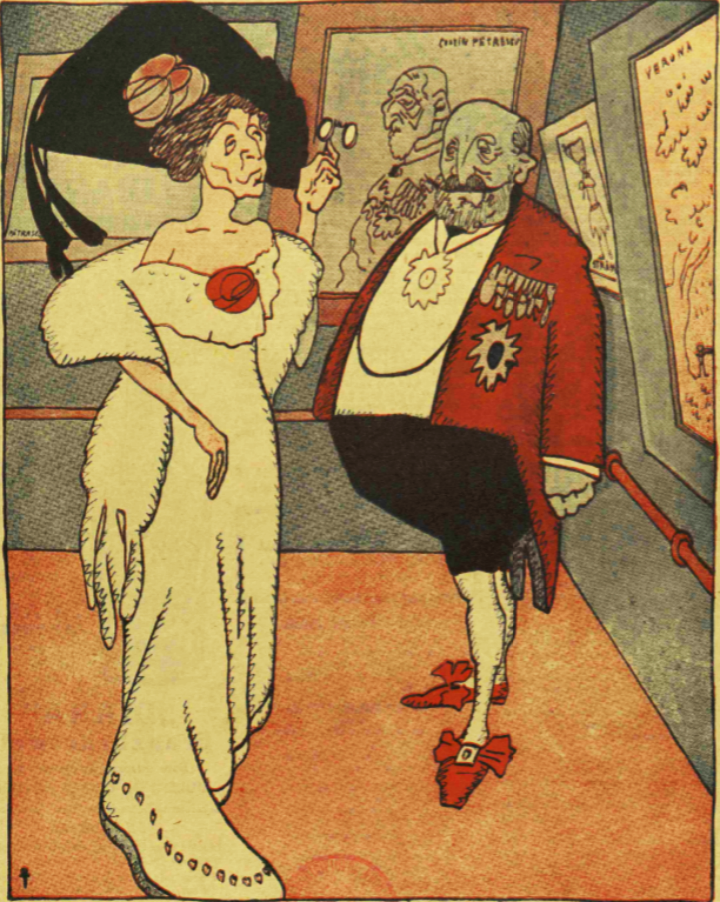
Kalinderu as an art collector, with Maica Smara; by Ion Theodorescu-Sion

Among Kalinderu's late contributions as a philanthropist was his involvement with the Romanian Red Cross. From October 1912, he served on its general council, alongside Sturdza, Gheorghe Grigore Cantacuzino, Grigore C. Crăiniceanu, Nicolae Filipescu, and Alexandru Obregia. He spent the better part of 1913 in conflict with the Conservative government, headed by his old rival Maiorescu. Against Maiorescu, Kalinderu tried to persuade Carol not to renew the pact tying Romania to the Triple Alliance. Arguing that it constituted support for a German hegemony, he managed to postpone its ratification. One of his final gestures was the intervention in favor of a protégé scholar, Orest Tafrali, for whom he obtained a chair at Iași University. He also made returns to scholarship, publishing in 1912 a commentary on the influence of Byzantine art on Romanian visual culture. It built on observations made by Gabriel Millet.

Kalinderu died in December 1913, and was buried at Bellu Cemetery, Plot 5, next to his father and his brother. The funeral witnessed speeches by Constantin C. Arion, Constantin Istrati, Basile M. Missir, and Sabba Ștefănescu. Kalinderu intended to disinherit his relatives and see his name praised after giving lavish donations to royal and academic institutions of culture; however, none of the wills were written in legal form, so that Kalinderu's wealth largely ended up going to his family. Argetoianu claims that Kalinderu had prepared a will benefiting his favorite institution, but ended up "quarreling with the Academy one year before his death", and failed to clarify his intentions in due time. The mystery and scandal surrounding Kalinderu's last wish inspired a novella by Nicolae M. Condiescu. This fictionalizes one theory, according to which Kalinderu ("Conu Enake" in the story) writes down a will donating his fortune to the academy, then destroys it on a whim. According to historian Matei Cazacu, the same events are also echoed in Mateiu Caragiale's 1929 novel, Craii de Curtea-Veche.

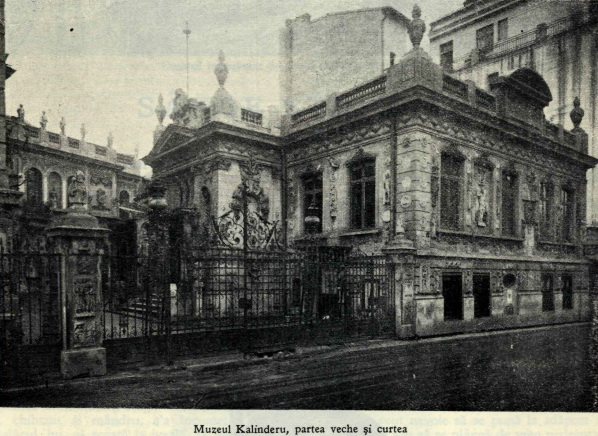
1934 photo of the older building of the Kalinderu Museum; this building no longer survives

From 1914, Kalideru's job at the crown domains went to Barbu Știrbey. That same year, the art museum bearing Ioan and Nicolae's names and containing their respective art collections, established 1907 as the first private art museum in the country, became state property via donation. The museum suffered damages during World War I: its Romanian-art section was evacuated during the battle of Bucharest, then confiscated by Bolshevik Russia. Kalinderu's park at Schitu-Greci was vandalized during the war and, by 1934, had still not been repaired.

Reopened during the interwar with the remainder of its collection, the Kalinderu Museum had Jean Alexandru Steriadi as its last director. It was eventually closed in 1946, shortly before the inauguration of a Romanian communist regime. Following the Romanian Revolution of 1989, Kalinderu's work and legacy were revisited: in 2005, a project to reestablish a Kalinderu Museum was being debated. After successively housing the Nicolae Grigorescu Institute of Fine Arts and the Union of Romanian Fine Artists, the museum building has been managed by the National Museum of Art of Romania since 2005, but is not open to the public.

In January 2014, the centennial of Kalinderu's death was solemnly marked by the General Association of Romanian Engineers, which discussed opening up a museum of the crown domains in Segarcea.
