= Romanian Crown Estate =

The Romanian Crown Estate was a group of companies or properties belonging to the Romanian state, intended to partially fund the activities of the Romanian Crown (Romanian royal family and the Romanian royal court).

The Crown Estate income is in addition to the civil list and other income from private funds (donations etc.). The Crown Estate aims at ensuring a normal funding of the Romanian royal family and limiting the funding from the Romanian state budget; usually the, civil list, a relatively low amount, cannot ensure a sufficient financing.

== History ==
The Crown Estates were born by the law of June 9, 1884, at the initiative of liberal politician Ion C. Brătianu. Since the establishment, for a long time (1884–1913), the position of Administrator of the Crown Estates has been owned by Romanian lawyer and forester Ioan Kalinderu.

In 1918, at the request of His Majesty King Ferdinand I of Romania, the Parliament legislated the passage of a part of the land belonging to the Crown Estates in exploitation – and later in the property – of the Romanian peasants (the 1921 Agrarian Reform).

In 1948, after the coup d'état of December 30, 1947, the Crown Estates were nationalized.

After the Romanian Revolution of 1989, the Romanian Royal Family only claimed in court the restitution of (personal) property belonging to King Michael I.

=== List of Crown Estates administrators ===
- Ioan Kalinderu, 1884–1913
- Barbu A. Știrbey, 1913–1927
- Ernest Ballif, 1927–1940
- Dimitrie Negel, 22 July 1942 – 4 January 1948

== Traditional Crown Estate properties ==
According to the Minerva Encyclopedia of 1929, the following Romanian properties were part, historically, of the Crown Estate: (prewar Romanian county references)

The estates totaled 129,989 hectares, divided into:

- Brăila county (prewar): 6,367 ha
- Dolj County: Sadova 19,353 ha; Segarcea 11,800 ha
- Ilfov County: Cocioc 3,674 ha
- Neamț County: Bicaz 13,224 ha; Borca 17,871 ha; Sabasa and Fărcașa 3,955 ha
- Prahova County: Gherghița 2,900 ha; Clăbucet Mountains with the Caraiman Peak 1,953 ha
- Buzău County: Domnița 5,487 ha
- Suceava County: Mălini 27,405 ha
- Vaslui County: Dobrovăț 6,300 ha.

Between 1900 and 1901, the Crown Estate had twelve estates throughout Romania totalling 132,112 hectares, 85,000 hectares of forest and 480,00 hectares agricultural land. From an administrative point of view, the Estates had ten districts with their own manager qualified in agricultural and forestry sciences. The agricultural estate was made up of eight estates mostly in Muntenia. The soil was of best quality and the crops were fertilised. To be able to fully use the allocated land, the ponds were drained. On that land orchards have been planted and fodder has been grown.

Vineyard represented around 3.19% of the total land and were found mainly on the Sadova and Segarcea Estate sandy land. Agricultural machinery was introduced, farms were established and crops were improved. The last segment was cattle breeding that benefited from the fodder infrastructure. Moldavian cattles were brought that were bred with the Algan breed with aim of improving the traction oxen breed. Next to Periș, on the Cancioc Estate in 1897 a dairy was established that had in 1901 160 cattles. In Dubravăț sheep were bred. Likewise to the cattle breeding, the sheep breeds were bred with other foreign breeds.

At Mălini and Bicaz there were pig farms as well as bee farms. From agriculture the activities expanded to industry, linen, mill, ceramic and factories have been built. As such, offices, dwellings for workers, stables, workshops and sheepfolds were built. In addition, a stud farm was set up in Durovats where the indigenous breed of horses was intended to be improved.

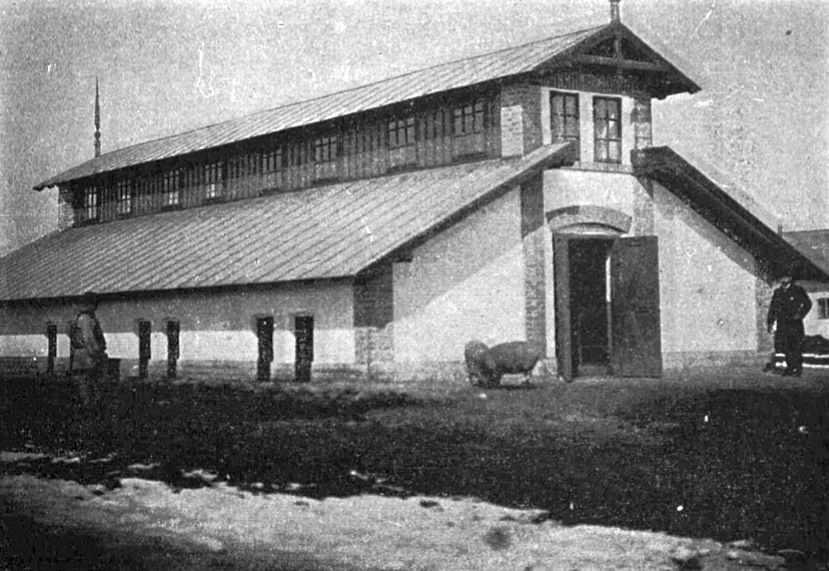
Pig farm on Dobroveț Estate

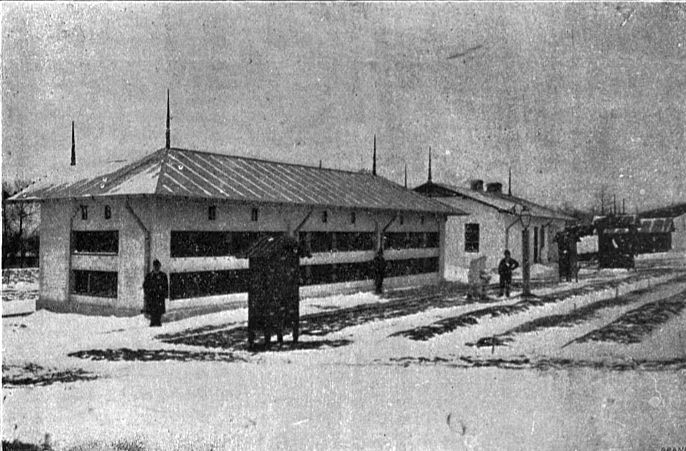
Bee farm on Cocioc Estate

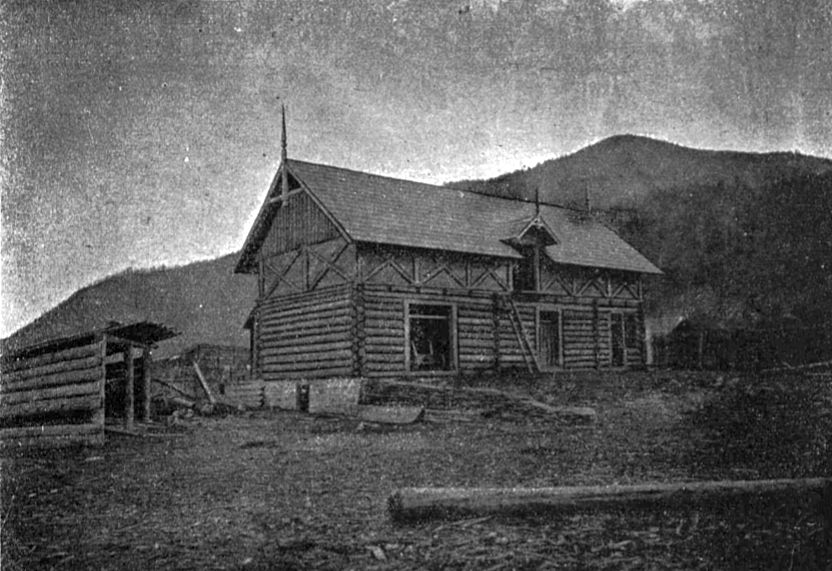
Stables on Bicaz Estate

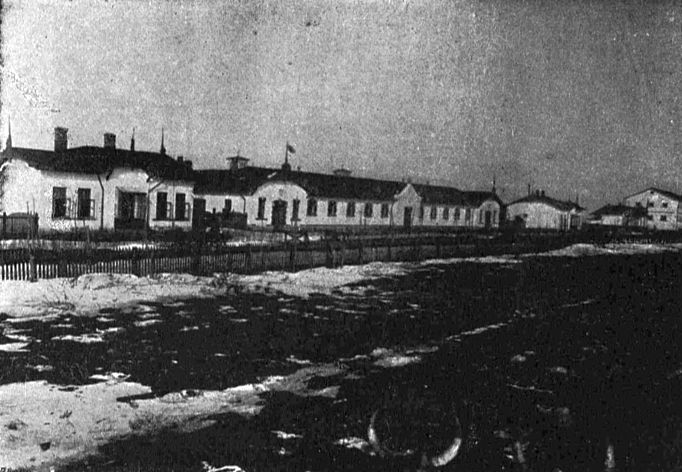
Dairy on Periș Estate

The forests of the Crown Estate numbered 84,000 ha, of which 67,000 ha in the mountains, 5,000 at the hill, and 12,000 at the plains. 97.3% of the forest was exploitable and only 2.7% was unproductive. The forests were beech, fir, oak, acacia or elm. Afforestations were made in the Sadova sands, and forest exploitation followed a strict forestry system. The transport of logs harvested to the sawmills or railway station was made on the water, narrow railways, or access roads existing at that time. 60 kilometers of railway and a 1.5 km funicular were built with 6 locomotives that had a power of 240 horses. The sawmills were at Poiana Doamnei, Găinești and Borca at Mălini, and at Piatra Corbului and Ața at Bicaz. Industry wise workshops were built for the manufacture of gates, windows, wooden vessels, furniture, etc. There were also hunting parks, one in Mălini and one in Bicaz, in Dubroveț there was a pheasantry, etc.

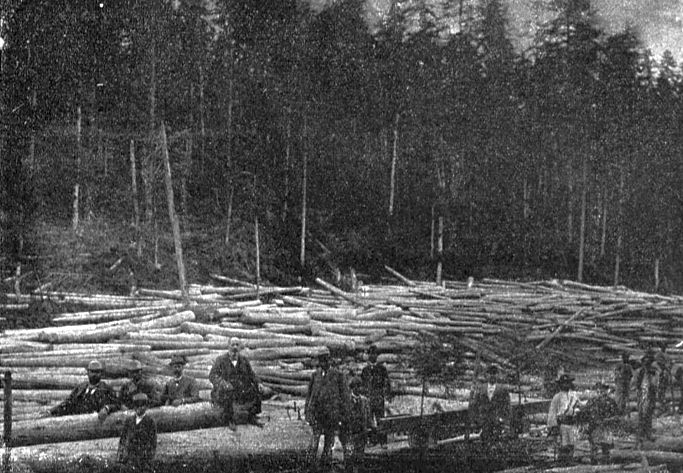
Trees cut from the Bicaz forest

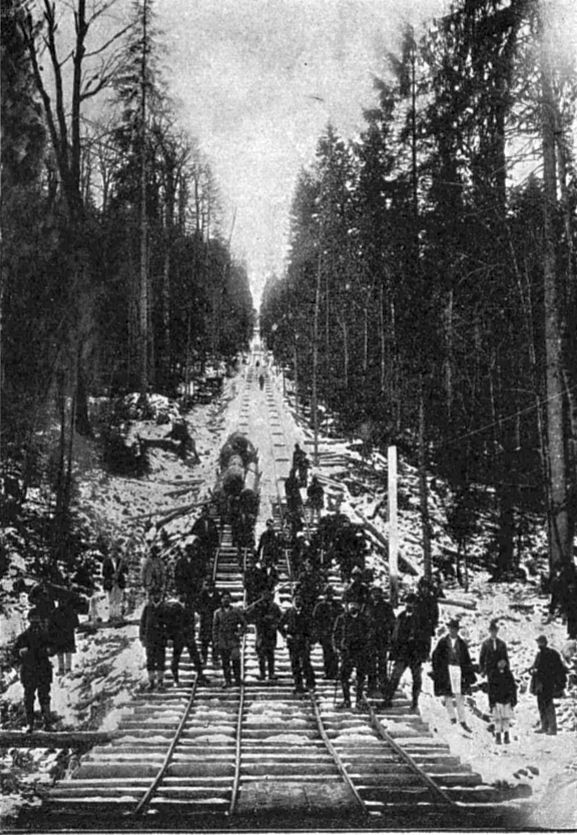
Funicular train from Mălini

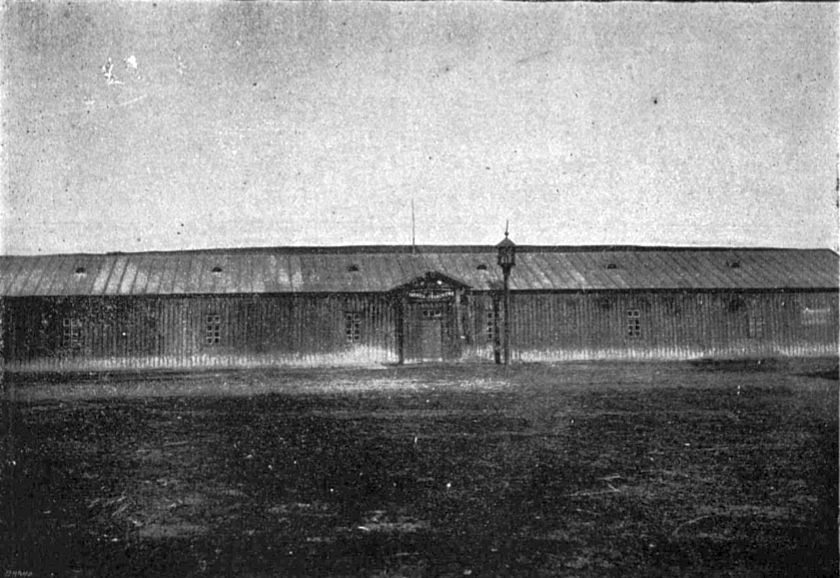
Rope factory at Dobroveț Estate

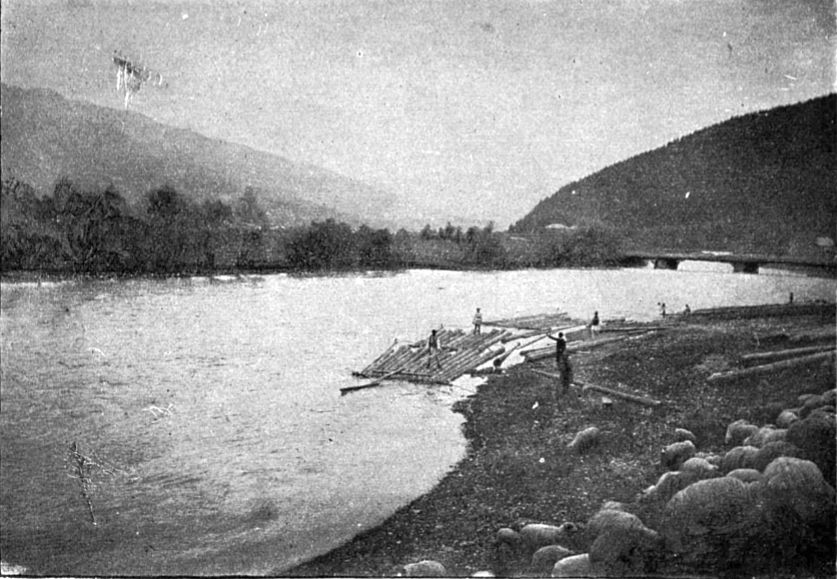
Rafts with logs on Bistrița

== Legal status, ownership and taxation ==
The Crown Estates are the property of the Romanian State; only the income from their commercial exploitation (usufruct) is intended to support the activity of the Royal Family.

The Crown Estate properties can only be sold by law.

By the operating law, the Crown Estate properties do not pay taxes to the central budget, but only to the local budgets (counties and communes).

In 1918, at the request of His Majesty King Ferdinand I of Romania, the Parliament legislated the passage of a part of the land belonging to the Crown Estates in exploitation - and later in the property - of the Romanian peasants (v. 1921 Agrarian Reform).

After the abdication of King Michael I of Romania, which took place on December 30, 1947, the Romanian Communists issued an act of nationalization of the Crown Estates.

After 1989, the Royal Family of Romania only claimed in court the restitution of (personal) property belonging to King Mihai I.

== Segarcea vineyard ==
Currently in private ownership, the vineyard and wine cellars of Segarcea, Dolj County, one of the vineyards belonging to the Estates, have gained international fame for wines produced and exported to many countries of the world under the trade name "The Crown Domain".

The Segarcea vineyard is one of the current suppliers of the Romanian Royal House. One of the wines produced in Segarcea bears the name of Her Royal Highness Princess Margareta of Romania.

Besides the Segarcea Estate, among the current suppliers of the Royal House of Romania there are also other wine producers, such as the Tohani Domains, which produce the assortment bearing the name of His Royal Highness Prince Radu of Romania.

== See also ==
- Civil list
- Segarcea
