= Vintilă Horia =

20th century Romanian writer

- Born: December 18, 1915; Segarcea, Dolj County, Romania
- Died: April 4, 1992 (aged 76); Collado Villalba, Spain
- Writing career
- Notable work: God Was Born in Exile (1960)

Vintilă Horia (Romanian pronunciation: [vinˈtilə ˈhori.a]; December 18, 1915 – April 4, 1992) was a Romanian writer, winner of the Prix Goncourt. His best known novel is God Was Born in Exile (1960).

== Life and career ==
Horia was born in Segarcea, a small town in Dolj County, Romania. After graduating from Saint Sava High School in Bucharest, he studied Law, and then Letters at the University of Bucharest, and in parallel at universities in Italy and Austria. An associate of the far right thinker Nichifor Crainic, Horia sat on the editorial board of his Sfarmă Piatră journal. He contributed to Gândirea and Porunca Vremii articles praising the Italian fascism of Benito Mussolini (Miracolul fascist — "The Fascist Miracle"), as well as pieces attacking authors whom the traditionalist group viewed as decadent (notably, Tudor Arghezi and Eugen Lovinescu).

After Crainic took over as Minister of Propaganda in King Carol II's authoritarian government, he appointed Horia as member of the diplomatic mission to Rome. According to his own account, Horia shared Crainic's rejection of the Iron Guard, and, after Carol was ousted by the latter's National Legionary State government, he was recalled from office. He later left for Vienna.

With Romania's siding with the Allies in August 1944 (see Romania during World War II), Horia was taken prisoner by the Nazi authorities, and interned in the concentration camps at Karpacz and Maria Pfarr. He was liberated a year later by the British Army.

Deciding not to return to an increasingly Soviet Union-dominated Romania, Vintilă Horia lived in Italy (where he became good friends with Giovanni Papini).

In 1946, following a trial in absentia during the Post-World War II Romanian war crime trials, Horia was sentenced to life in prison for facilitating the penetration of fascist ideas in Romania, and for making the case for those ideas to be implemented under the leadership of the German embassy in Bucharest. The sentence against him has never been rescinded. In 1948, Horia moved to Argentina, where he taught at the Universidad de Buenos Aires; after March 1953, he lived in Spain, employed as a researcher in the Italic Studies field.

He won the Prix Goncourt for his novel Dieu est né en exil (God was born in exile) in 1960; however, following the allegations that he had been a member of the Iron Guard, Horia refused to receive the Prize, but the Goncourt remains attributed to him. According to some, the allegations constituted slander aimed at Horia by the communist regime, with the purpose of blackmailing him into issuing positive remarks about the regime. His book notably attracted Jean-Paul Sartre's criticism.

Other prizes received by Vintilă Horia include Medalla de Oro de Il Conciliatore, Milano (1961); Bravo para los hombres que unem en la verdad, Madrid (1972); and the Dante Alighieri Prize, Florence (1981).

He died in Collado Villalba, a municipality of Madrid, and was buried in the Madrid Civil Cemetery.

The centenary of Vintilă Horia was celebrated at the University of Alcalá (a Spanish university in Alcalá de Henares) and in several towns in Romania.

== Literary works ==
=== Novels ===
- Acolo și stelele ard, Ed. Gorjan, București, 1942.
- Dieu est né en exil, Fayard, Paris, 1960.
- Le Chevalier de la Résignation, Fayard, Paris, 1961.
- Les Impossibles, Fayard, Paris, 1962.
- La septième lettre. Le roman de Platon, Plon, Paris, 1964.
- Une femme pour l’Apocalypse, Éditions Julliard, Paris, 1968.
- El hombre de las nieblas, Plaza y Janés, Barcelona, 1970.
- El viaje a San Marcos, Magisterio Español, Madrid, 1972.
- Marta, o, La segunda guerra. Barcelona: Plaza & Janés. 1982. ISBN 84-01-30350-8. OCLC 8810329.
- Persécutez Boèce. Lausanne: L'Âge d'Homme. 1987. OCLC 1277250548.
- Un sepulcro en el cielo. Barcelona: Planeta. 1987. ISBN 84-320-7190-0. OCLC 16074565.
- Les clefs du crépuscule. Lausanne: L'Âge d'Homme. 1990. ISBN 2-8251-0073-0. OCLC 26151582.
- Mai sus de miazănoapte. București: Cartea Românească. 1992. OCLC 431782399.

=== Short stories ===
- El despertar de la sombra, Editora Nacional, Madrid, 1967.
- Informe último sobre el Reino H, Plaza y Janés, Barcelona, 1981.
- Moartea morții mele, Ed. Dacia, Cluj-Napoca, 1999.
- El fin del exilio. Cuentos de juventud, Criterio Libros, Madrid, 2002.

=== Memoirs ===
- Journal d’un paysan du Danube, Table Ronde, Paris, 1966.
- Memoriile unui fost săgetător, Ed. Vremea, București, 2015.

=== Essays ===
- Presencia del mito, Escelicer, Madrid, 1956.
- Poesía y libertad, Madrid, Ateneo, 1959.
- La rebeldia de los escritores soviéticos, Rialp, Madrid, 1960.
- Quaderno italiano, Pisa, 1962.
- Giovanni Papini, Wesmael-Charlier, Paris, 1963.
- Juan Dacio, Diccionario de los Papas. Prefacio de Vintila Horia. Editorial Destino, Barcelona 1963. (Juan Dacio is the pseudonym of Vintila Horia.)
- Platon, personaje de novela, Ateneo, Madrid, 1964.
- España y otros mundos, Plaza y Janés, Barcelona, 1970.
- Viaje a los Centros de la Tierra, Plaza y Janés, Barcelona, 1971.
- Pepi Sánchez, Prensa Española, Madrid, 1972.
- Mester de novelista, Prensa Española, Madrid, 1972.
- Encuesta detrás de lo visible, Plaza y Janés, Barcelona,1975.
- Introducción a la literatura del siglo XX. (Ensayo de epistemología literaria), Gredos, Madrid, 1976.
- Consideraciones sobre un mundo peor, Plaza y Janés, Madrid, 1978.
- Literatura y disidencia, Ed. Rioduero, Madrid, 1980.
- Los derechos humanos y la novela del siglo XX, Magisterio Español, Madrid, 1981.
- Mai bine mort decât comunist, Phoenix, București, 1990.
- Dicționarul Papilor, Editura Saeculum I.O., 1999.

=== Poetry ===
- Procesiuni, Ed. Pavel Suru, București, 1936.
- Cetatea cu duhuri, Ed. Pavel Suru, București, 1939.
- Cartea omului singur, Ed. Pavel Suru, București, 1941.
- A murit un Sfânt, Valle Hermoso (Argentina), 1952.
- Poesia romaneasca noua. Antologie, Colecția “Meșterul Manole”, Salamanca, 1956.
- Jurnal de copilărie, Fundația Regală Universitară Carol I, Paris, 1958.
- Viitor petrecut, Salamanca, 1976.

== Books and PhD theses consecrated to Vintilă Horia ==
=== Books ===
- Sanda Stolojan, Au balcon de l’exil roumain à Paris: avec Cioran, Eugène Ionesco, Mircea Eliade, Vintilă Horia…, Paris, L'Harmattan, 1999.
- Crenguța Gânscă, Vintilă Horia. Al zecelea cerc: eseu despre o trilogie a exilului, Cluj-Napoca, Dacia, 2001.
- Marilena Rotaru, Întoarcerea lui Vintilă Horia, Ideea, București, 2002.
- Cecilia Latiș, Arhitecturi paralele: Marguerite Yourcenar –Vintilă Horia, Suceava, Editura Universității din Suceava, 2003.
- Cecilia Latiș, Polifonii creatoare: paralelă între creația lui Marguerite Yourcenar și a lui Vintilă Horia, Suceava, Editura Universității din Suceava, 2003.
- Pompiliu Crăciunescu, Vintilă Horia - Translittérature et Réalité, Editura L’Homme Indivis, Veauche, Franța, 2008.
- Georgeta Orian, Vintilă Horia, un scriitor împotriva timpului său, Cluj-Napoca, Limes, 2008.
- Pompiliu Crăciunescu, Vintilă Horia - Transliteratură și Realitate, București, Curtea Veche, 2011.
- Sonia Elvireanu, Fața întunecată a lui Ianus – Vintilă Horia, Dumitru Țepeneag, Norman Manea, Gabriel Pleșa, Editura Tipo Moldova, Colecția „Academica”, Iași, 2013.
- Nicolae Florescu, Vintilă Horia între „ieșirea din a exista și intrarea în a fi”, București, Editura Jurnalul Literar, 2014.
- Mihaela Albu and Dan Anghelescu, Eseistica lui Vintilă Horia – deschideri către transdisciplinaritate, Craiova, Aius, 2015.
- (in Romanian) Isabela Vasiliu-Scraba: "Mircea Eliade, Vintilă Horia și un istoric răpit prin Berlinul de est"
- (in Romanian) Isabela Vasiliu-Scraba: "Receptarea româneasca a primului scriitor străin laureat al premiului GONCOURT"
- (in Romanian) Isabela Vasiliu-Scraba: "Vintilă Horia exilat"
- (in Romanian) Isabela Vasiliu-Scraba: "Vintilă Horia ca istoric al filozofiei româneşti"

=== PhD theses ===
- Monica Nedelcu, La obra literaria de Vintila Horia. El espacio del exilio en cuatro novelas francesas (L’œuvre littéraire de Vintila Horia. L’espace de l’exil dans quatre romans français), Complutense University of Madrid, Colección Tesis Doctorales, 1989.
- Claudia Drăgănoiu, La prose littéraire d’exil : Vintilă Horia, Constantin Virgil Gheorghiu et L. M. Arcade (Proză literară de exil: Vintilă Horia, Constantin Virgil Gheorghiu și L. M. Arcade), Strasbourg, Faculté des Lettres, University of Strasbourg, 2011.
- Manuela Alexe, Représentations de l’espace dans la prose de Vintilă Horia (Reprezentări ale spațiului în proza lui Vintilă Horia), Școala doctorală de studii literare și culturale, University of Bucharest, 2012.
- Renata-Simona Georgescu, L’image de la Roumanie chez Vintilă Horia, Petru Dumitriu et Paul Goma, Facultatea de Litere, Babeș-Bolyai University, Cluj-Napoca, 2013.
- Alina Elena Costin, Vintilă Horia: Exil et création, Facultatea de Litere, Alexandru Ioan Cuza University, Iași, 2013.
- Sonia Elvireanu, Fața întunecată a lui Ianus – Vintilă Horia, Dumitru Țepeneag, Norman Manea, Gabriel Pleșa, Facultatea de Istorie și Filologie, 1 Decembrie 1918 University, Alba Iulia, 2013.
