= Emanoil Savin =

Romanian politician (1958–2024)

Member of the Senate of Romania for Prahova County
- In office 21 December 2016 – 21 December 2020

Personal details
- Born: 6 September 1958 Bușteni, Romania
- Died: 4 August 2024 (aged 65) Bușteni, Romania
- Party: PDL (until 2014); PNL (2014–2016); PSD (2016–2024)
- Education: National College of Defence; Bucharest Academy of Economic Studies
- Occupation: Businessman

Emanoil Savin (6 September 1958 – 4 August 2024) was a Romanian businessman and politician. A member of the Social Democratic Party, he served in the Senate from 2016 to 2020.

Savin served as mayor of the town Bușteni, Prahova County from 2004 to 2016. He was re-elected in June 2024, but died from a heart attack in Bușteni, on 4 August 2024, at the age of 65.
