= God Was Born in Exile =

1960 novel by Vintilă Horia

- First UK edition (Publ. George Allen & Unwin)
- Author: Vintilă Horia
- Original title: Dieu est né en exil
- Translator: A. Lytton Sells
- Language: French
- Publisher: Fayard
- Publication date: 1960
- Publication place: France
- English publication date: 1961

God Was Born in Exile (French: Dieu est né en exil) is a novel by Romanian author Vintilă Horia, for which he was awarded the Prix Goncourt in 1960, though he was never handed the prize following allegations that surfaced after his nomination that he had once been a member of the Iron Guard.

The novel's narrator is Ovid, the Roman poet, and this apocryphal work is rather similar to Marguerite Yourcenar's Mémoires d'Hadrien in which Yourcenar writes the Roman emperor Hadrian's mémoires.

In God Was Born in Exile, "Ovid" covers the last eight years of his life, when he was exiled to Tomis, an Ancient Roman colony in Scythia Minor. This novel adopts the form of a diary, divided into eight chapters (each of which corresponds to a year of exile) that reveal the steps of a progressive "maturation", or a conversion of sorts.

The novel's universe is linked together around a primordial axis whose two poles are Roman society and the Dacian world, respectively. This dichotomy generates a rich range of metaphors, but perhaps this novel's most important attribute is the way in which both worlds are constructed, and their importance as "chronotopes" in the narrative. Ovid's spiritual journey resolves itself between both symbolic universes whose antagonistic characters become interwoven during a chiasm, in order to rise up again at the end of the radically metamorphized narration.
