= Smaranda Gheorghiu =

Romanian poet, novelist, essayist, playwright, educator, feminist and traveler

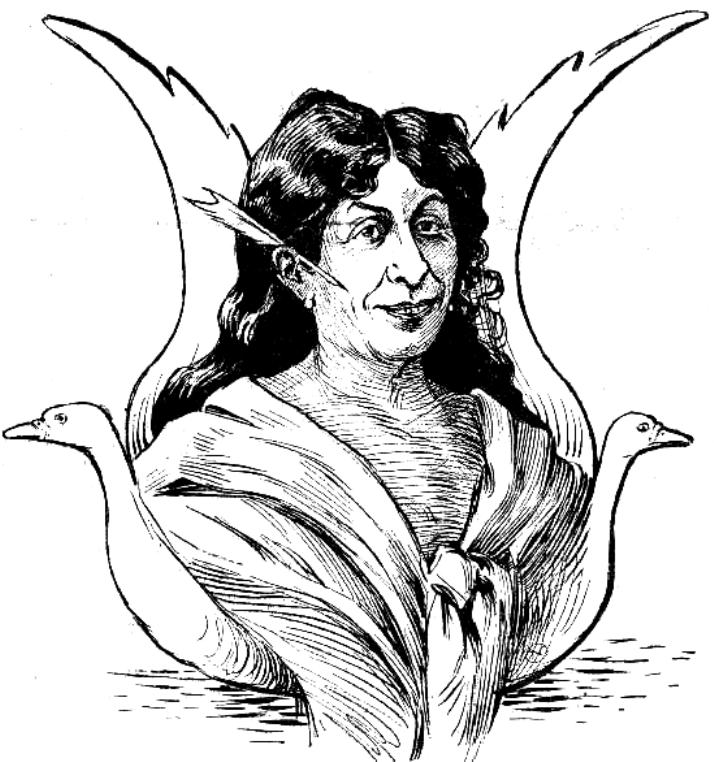
Caricature of Smaranda "Maica Smara" Gheorghiu, published on the cover of Furnica magazine. 1904.

Smaranda Gheorghiu born Andronescu (5 October 1857 – 26 January 1944) was a Romanian poet, novelist, essayist, playwright, educator, feminist and traveler. She wrote under a number of pseudonyms and is perhaps best known under the moniker Maica Smara (Mother Smara), which was given to her by Veronica Micle.

An early Romanian feminist, she wrote both fiction and non-fiction with a feminist slant in which she argued against the prevailing views of the time, which held women to be intellectually inferior to men. Smara traveled extensively and recorded her experiences in several volume of travel literature. For her work as a teacher and her efforts to reform the education system, she is sometimes called "Educator of the People".

== Biography ==
She was born on 5 October 1857 in the Wallachian city of Târgoviște in a noble family. The daughter of Niţă Andronescu and Alexandrina Vlădescu, she was the oldest of ten children. Niță was a wealthy landowner and one time prefect of the county, while Alexandrina, also of noble stock, was a woman who thoroughly enjoyed traveling and delighting her close ones with stories of European museums. Although the precise relation is disputed, Smaranda was a relative of poet and fabulist Grigore Alexandrescu.

After elementary studies in her hometown, in 1870 she went to high-school in Bucharest, graduating from the Central School for Girls. Soon after finishing high-school she married George Gârbea, a teacher, against her family's wishes. Gârbea encouraged her literary interests and introduced her to some of the cultural paragons of the age, such as Ion Luca Caragiale, George Coşbuc and Alexandru Vlahuţă. It was during this time that she first started publishing poetry.

She left her husband in the early 1880s, when she obtained a teaching position in the town of Sinaia. In 1883 she met Petre Gheorghiu, an army captain and moved with him to Ploiești, where she taught and started contributing to the Şcoala Română magazine. She later moved to Bucharest, where she continued teaching for the rest of her life. By the mid-1880s she was already established in the Bucharest literary scene, with Smaranda hosting some of the most popular gatherings of the cultural elite. Around this time she met Mihai Eminescu and Veronica Micle, who soon became her friends and gave her the nickname Maica Smara, a reference to both motherhood and monasticism.

Her second husband, Petre Gheorghiu died a few years after their marriage, leaving her with two daughters: Zoe and Magadalena, one from each marriage.

== Literary career ==
Her literary debut came in 1881, when she began publishing poetry in Alexandru Macedonski's Literatorul magazine. Much of her early output consisted of pedagogical writings and children's literature. She also started to publish more serious poetry and essays in literary magazines and periodicals such as Convorbiri literare, Fântâna Blanduziei, Adevărul, Revista literară, Generația viitoare, Românul, Tribuna and Universul.

In 1888 she published her first book, a volume of poetry called Din pana suferinței (Suffering's Pen). Her next volume was a book of short stories, Novele (1890). In 1892, shortly after the death of her friend, Veronica Micle, she wrote a monograph of Micle, in which she outlined her contributions to the Romantic poetry of Romania. A talk on Micle's legacy held at the Romanian Athenaeum on 13 December 1891 also made her the first woman to lecture there.

In 1893 Smaranda Gheorghiu issued her own literary journal, Altițe și Bibiliuri (Lace and Frills), in which she called for a reform of the education system, which she saw as outdated. Throughout the 1890s her works became more politically charged. In 1896 she gave two lectures on feminism, among the first of their kind in Romania, Feciorii și fiicele noastre (Our Sons and Daughters) and Inteligența femeii (Women's Intelligence), both later published as books. Around the turn of the century, Maica Smara began publishing travel literature, based on her tours of Europe. Between 1904 and 1906 she published several plays covering subjects including incest, legal male responsibility for fathered children, the Union of the Romanian principalities, or working class life. Her first novel, Fata tatii, (Daddy's Girl) was published in 1912 and deals with feminist issues.

She continued to write until near the end of her life, with the last work published during her lifetime being Cântă Dorna (Dorna is Singing), an epic poem in two acts that appeared in 1939.

She is known today for the lyrics “Vine vine primăvara / Se așterne-n toată țara / Floricele pe câmpii / Hai să le-adunăm copii” that make up the ”Cântecul școlarului”, a children's song about the arrival of spring.

== Activism and travels ==
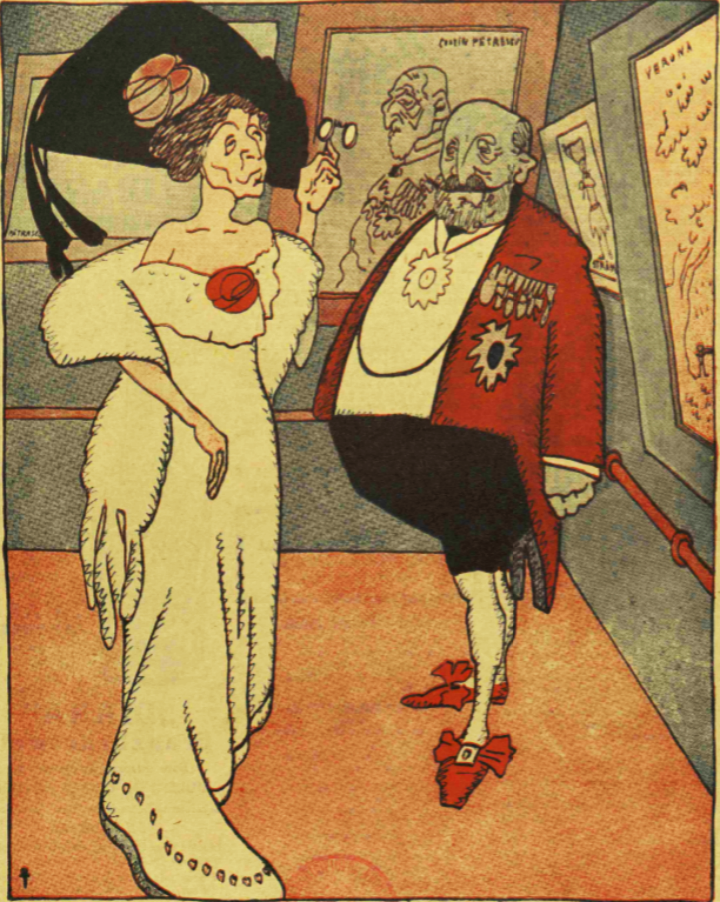
Caricature in Furnica showing art collector Ioan Kalinderu welcoming Maica Smara in his incipient Bucharest museum of art. 1910.

Particularly after the death of her second husband, Smaranda traveled extensively in Romania, Italy, Belgium, France, Norway, Denmark, Sweden, Finland, Greece etc., often lecturing on education and women's emancipation. She described many of these excursions in a series of travel writings.

As her fame grew, she was invited to represent Romania in several international conferences, such as the 8th International Congress of Orientalists (Stockholm and Christiania, 1889), the 9th Universal Peace Congress (Paris, 1900) and the Latin Congress (Paris, 1902). In 1900 she was elected vice-president of the Universal Union of Women's Congress for Peace. She was also a strong supporter of outdoor education, and in 1936 took part in the Second International Congress for Open Air Education, which took place in Belgium.

Some sources incorrectly said that Smaranda Gheorghiu was the first woman to reach the North Pole. This false claim most likely appeared as a misunderstanding of the title of her 1932 volume O româncă spre Polul Nord (A Romanian Woman towards the North Pole), which details her 1902 travels through Denmark, Sweden, Norway and Finland. According to this travel memoir, she did manage to reach North Cape, one of the northernmost points of Europe, more than 2000 kilometers shy of the North Pole.

== Legacy ==
She died on 26 January 1944 in Bucharest and was buried in the Bellu Cemetery.

A bust depicting her was unveiled in Mitropoliei Park, Târgoviște in 1957. A second bust can be seen in Cișmigiu Gardens, in central Bucharest, where she is described as ”Educatoare a poporului” (Educator of the Romanian People).

The secondary school ”Smaranda Gheorghiu” in Târgoviște was named in her honour in 1997.

== Bibliography ==
=== Poetry ===
- Din pana suferinței, 1888 (Suffering's Pen)
- Corbul cu pene de aur, 1897 (The Raven with Golden Feathers)
- Mozaicuri, 1897 (Inlays)
- Calvar, 1901 (Calvary)
- Țara mea, 1905 (My Country)
- Cântă Dorna, 1939 (Dorna is Singing)

=== Short stories ===
- Novele, 1890 (Novellas)
- Dumitrițe brumate, 1932 (Hoarfrosted Marigolds)

=== Novels ===
- Fata tatii, 1912 (Daddy's Girl)
- Băiatul mamei, 1917 (Mom's Boy)
- Domnul Bădină, 1931 (Mr. Bădină)

=== Theater plays ===
- Mirza, 1904
- Ispășire, 1905 (Expiation)
- La 24 ianuarie, 1905 (On January 24)
- Dorul de țară, 1905 (Homesickness)
- Meseriașii, 1905 (The Craftsmen)
- Stâlpi de pază, 1906 (The Guarding Pillars)

=== Travel literature ===
- Schițe din Târgoviște, 1898 (Sketches from Târgoviște)
- Schițe si amintiri din Italia, 1900 (Sketches and Memories from Italy)
- De la București la Capul Nord, 1905 (From Bucharest to Cape North)
- Schite si amintiri din Cehoslovacia, 1925 (Sketches and Memories from Czechoslovakia)
- O româncă spre Polul Nord, 1932 (A Romanian Woman towards the North Pole)

=== Non-fiction ===
- Veronica Micle. Viața și operile sale, 1892 (Veronica Micle. Her Life and Works)
- Feciorii și fiicele noastre, 1896 (Our Sons and Daughters)
- Inteligența femeii, 1896 (Women's Intelligence)
