= Heroes' Cross on Caraiman Peak =

Monument in Romania

- Romania
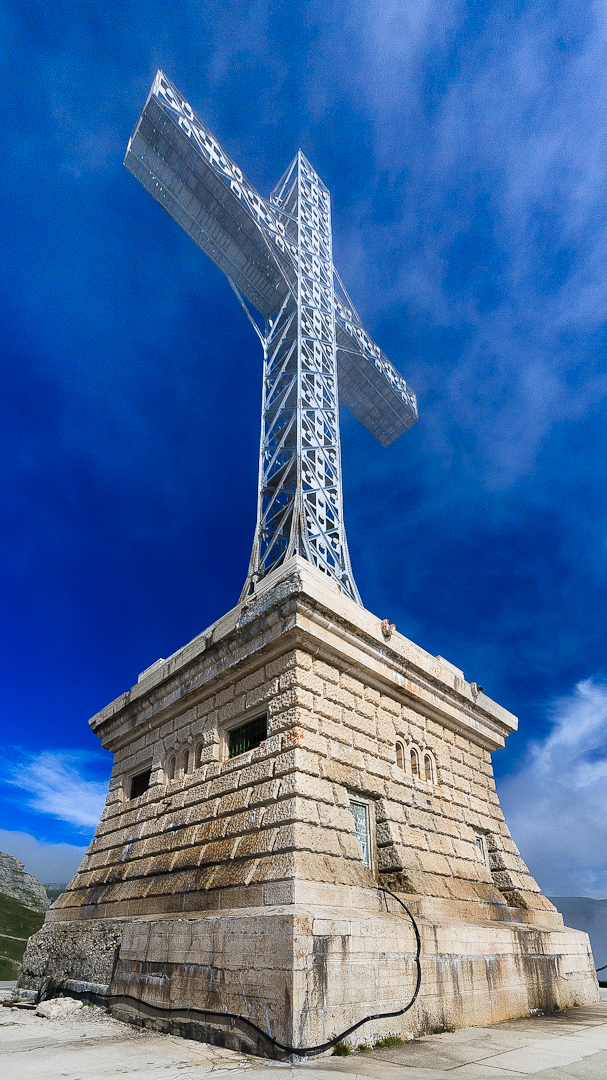
- Front view of the memorial
- For the people who died during World War I
- Unveiled: 14 September 1928
- Location: 45.415989°N 25.497472°E near Buşteni, Romania
- Designed by: George Cristinel and Constantin Procopiu

Burials by nation
- Kingdom of Romania

Burials by war
- World War I

The Commemorative Cross to the Romanian Heroes of the First World War (Romanian: Crucea comemorativă a eroilor români din Primul Război Mondial), also called the Heroes' Cross on Mount Cairaman (Crucea Eroilor de pe Muntele Caraiman) is a monument built between 1926 and 1928 on Caraiman Peak at an altitude of 2,291 m located in Romania, in the Bucegi Mountains of the Southern Carpathians. It has a height of 39.3 metres (129 ft) and the nearest town is Buşteni. The name of the monument is "The Heroes' Cross", but it is popularly known as the "Cross on Caraiman".

== Location and size ==
The Heroes' Cross is located in the saddle of the Caraiman Mountains, on the slope to the Seacă Valley at an elevation of 2,291 metres (7,516 ft). The cross itself has a height of 28 metres (92 ft) and two arms of 7 metres (23 ft) each. The monument is the tallest summit cross in the world situated at such an altitude, as recognized in 2014 by Guinness World Records. The width of the vertical pole is 2 metres (7 ft), the horizontal arms have a length by spindle pole of 7 metres (23 ft), and a square cross section with sides of 2 metres (7 ft). The cross is made out of steel profiles and is mounted on a pedestal of concrete clad with stone 7.5 metres (25 ft) high. Inside the pedestal there is a room that originally housed the electric generator that powered the 120 light bulbs of 500 W each located on the perimeter of the cross.

== Monument construction ==
The Heroes' Cross was built between 1926 and 1928 in the memory of the railway heroes who died on duty in World War I fighting against the armies of the Central Powers. The cross was erected at the initiative of Marie of Edinburgh and King Ferdinand of Romania in order to be seen from a large distance as possible. The overall project was developed by Romanian architects Georges Cristinel and Constantin Procopiu. The construction of the monument began in 1926 and was completed in August 1928. Queen Marie had closely followed the implementation of her instructions until the completion of the project. Inauguration and consecration of the monument took place on September 14, 1928 on the Holy Cross Day. The monument was made of metal sleepers joined by riveting in a network pattern. The actual construction was done by the Heroes' Cult Society that mobilized a large number of young people. Tools, wood, metal parts, the remaining components and all the necessary materials were transported by train to the Buşteni railway station. From here some metal beams and other building materials were transported by oxen on the route Buşteni - Sinaia - Păduchiosul Peak - Dichiu Peak - Bucegi Plateau - Caraiman Peak and the remaining materials were transported by the funicular owned by the Buşteni Paper Mill. The funicular transported different parts along the Jepilor Valley all the way to Schiel Canton, where they were taken on narrow trails with horses and donkeys to the top of the Caraiman Peak.

== Illumination ==
At first lighting of the monument was made with the help of an electricity generator (located in the concrete pedestal) and 120 bulbs of 500 W each. In 1939 the Cross was connected to the national energy grid and thus the generator was made redundant; the power comes via underground cable from the electrical substation of the Coştila radio relay complex located at an altitude of 2,487 metres (8,159 ft). Until the communist regime in 1948, the cross was lit on the night of the Dormition of the Theotokos (August 15) but also on the Ascension day when the Hero Remembrance Day was celebrated as well.

The monument is currently administered by the Buşteni City Council. Nowadays, at night, the Cross on Caraiman is illuminated with 300 light bulbs of 500 W each and can be seen from dozens of miles away, on the Prahova Valley. There is a new project which aims to cover the cross with a fluorescent dye and on top of the cross to be a projected laser spot.

== Image gallery ==
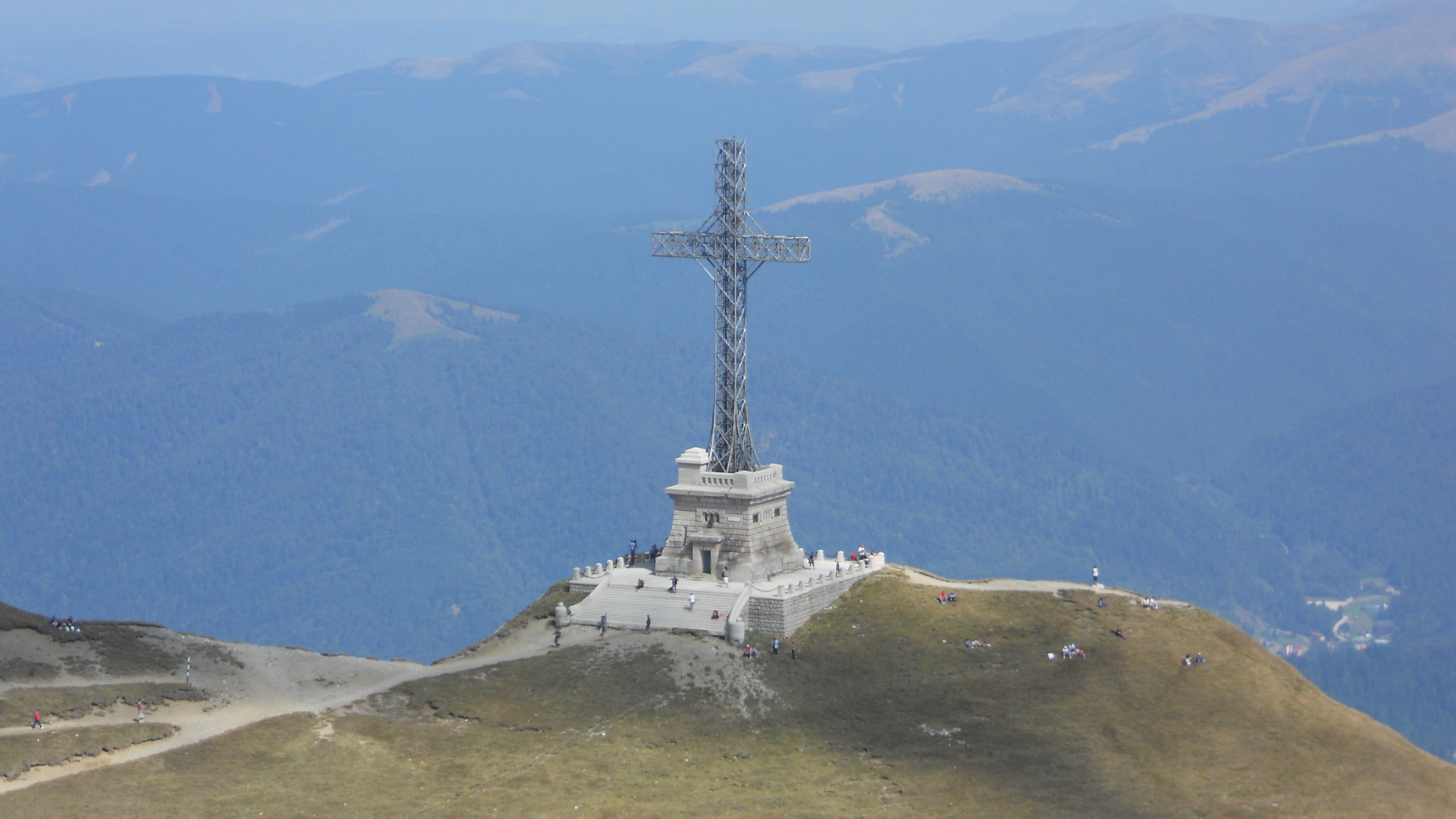
Heroes' Cross

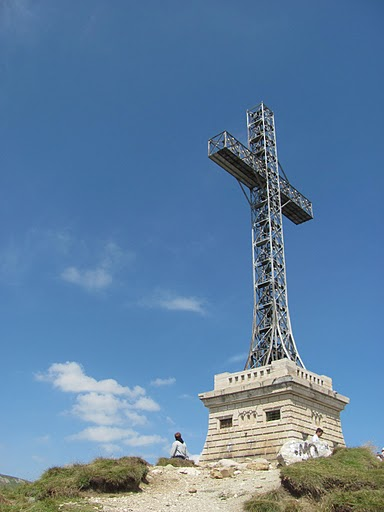
Heroes' Cross - side view

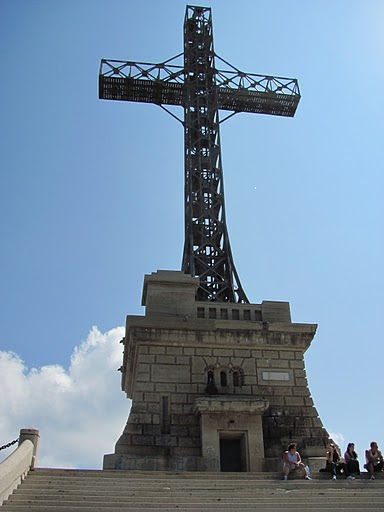
Heroes' Cross - view from the stairs

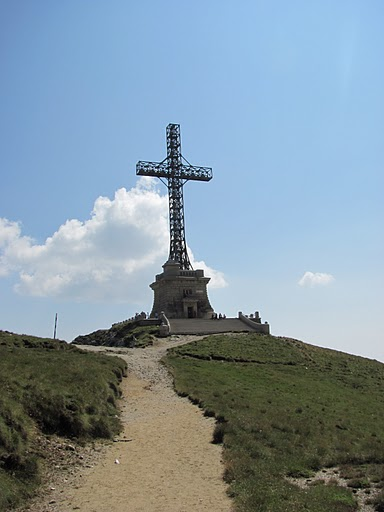
Heroes' Cross - side view

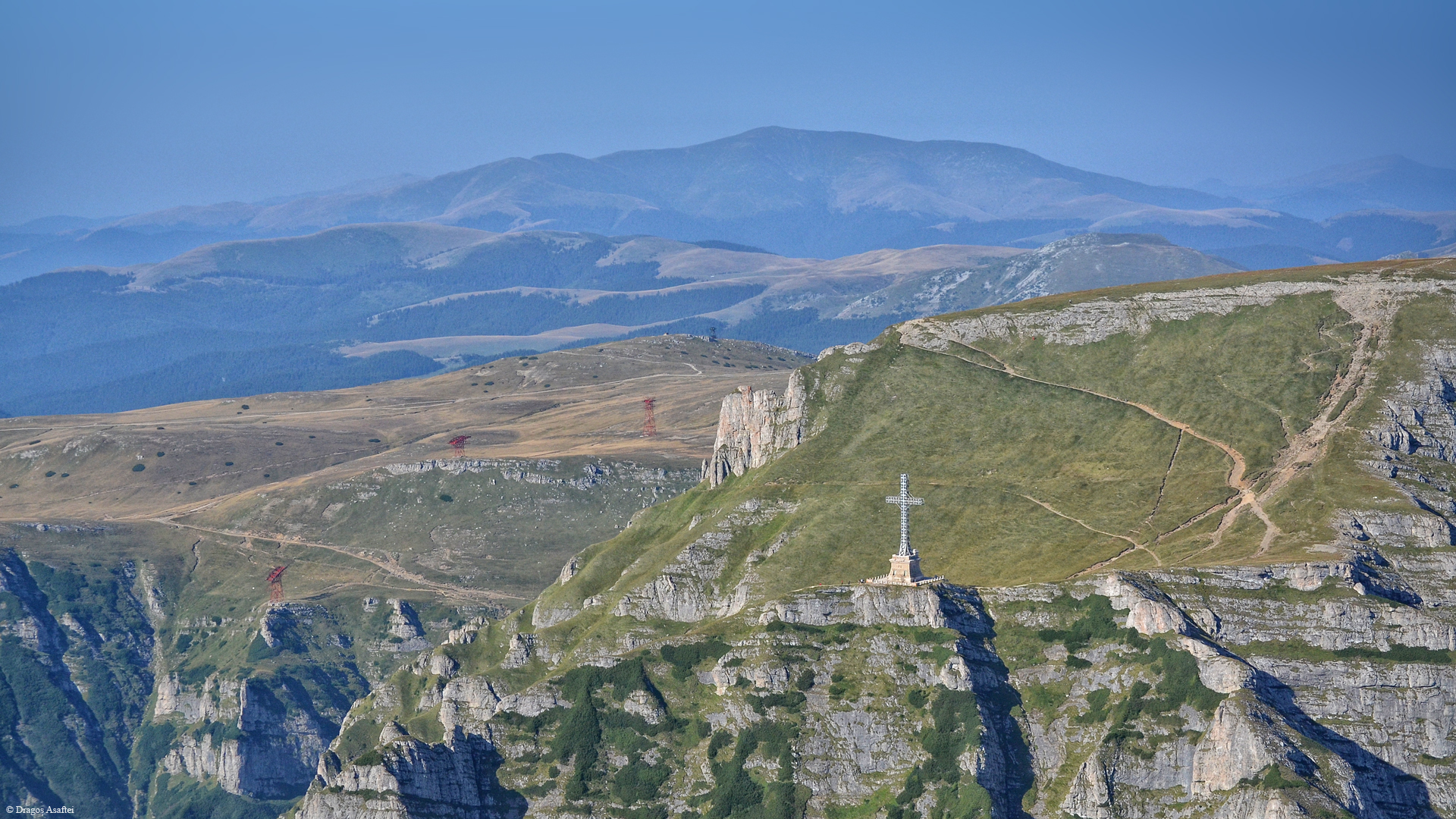
Aerial view

== See also ==
- Tourism in Romania
- Seven Wonders of Romania
- Romania during World War I
