= Segarcea =

- Town
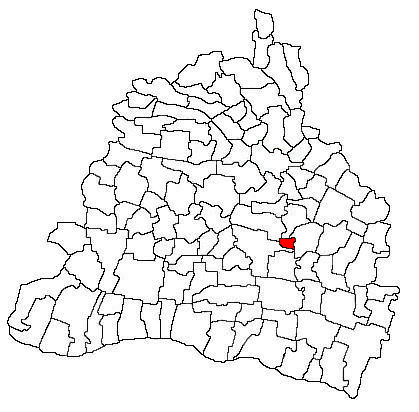
- Location in Dolj County

- Location in Romania
- Coordinates: 44°5′40″N 23°44′45″E
- Country: Romania
- County: Dolj

Government
  - Mayor (2024–2028): Ștefan Nicolae (PNL)
- Area: 12.01 km^{2} (4.64 sq mi)
- Elevation: 130 m (430 ft)
- Population (2021-12-01): 7,356
  - Density: 612.5/km^{2} (1,586/sq mi)
- Time zone: UTC+02:00 (EET)
  - Summer (DST): UTC+03:00 (EEST)
- Postal code: 205400
- Area code: (+40) 02 51
- Vehicle reg.: DJ
- Website: www.primariasegarcea.ro

Historical population
Year	Pop.	±%
1977	8,534	—
1992	8,581	+0.6%
2002	8,704	+1.4%
2011	7,019	−19.4%
2021	7,356	+4.8%
Source: Census data

Segarcea is a small town in Dolj County, Oltenia, Romania. It has 7,356 inhabitants (2021 census), in an area of 12,008 ha (29,670 acres).

The town is located towards the western end of the Wallachian Plain, about 30 km (19 mi) north of the Danube and 25 km (16 mi) south of Craiova, the county seat. Situated in the east-central part of Dolj County, Segarcea belongs to the Craiova metropolitan area.

The town is famous for its white wines. The Segarcea vineyard belongs to the Romanian Crown Estate; it has gained fame for wines produced and exported to many countries of the world under the trade name "The Crown Domain".

== Natives ==
- Ștefan Grigorie (born 1982), footballer
- Vintilă Horia (1915–1992), writer
