= Bușteni =

- Town
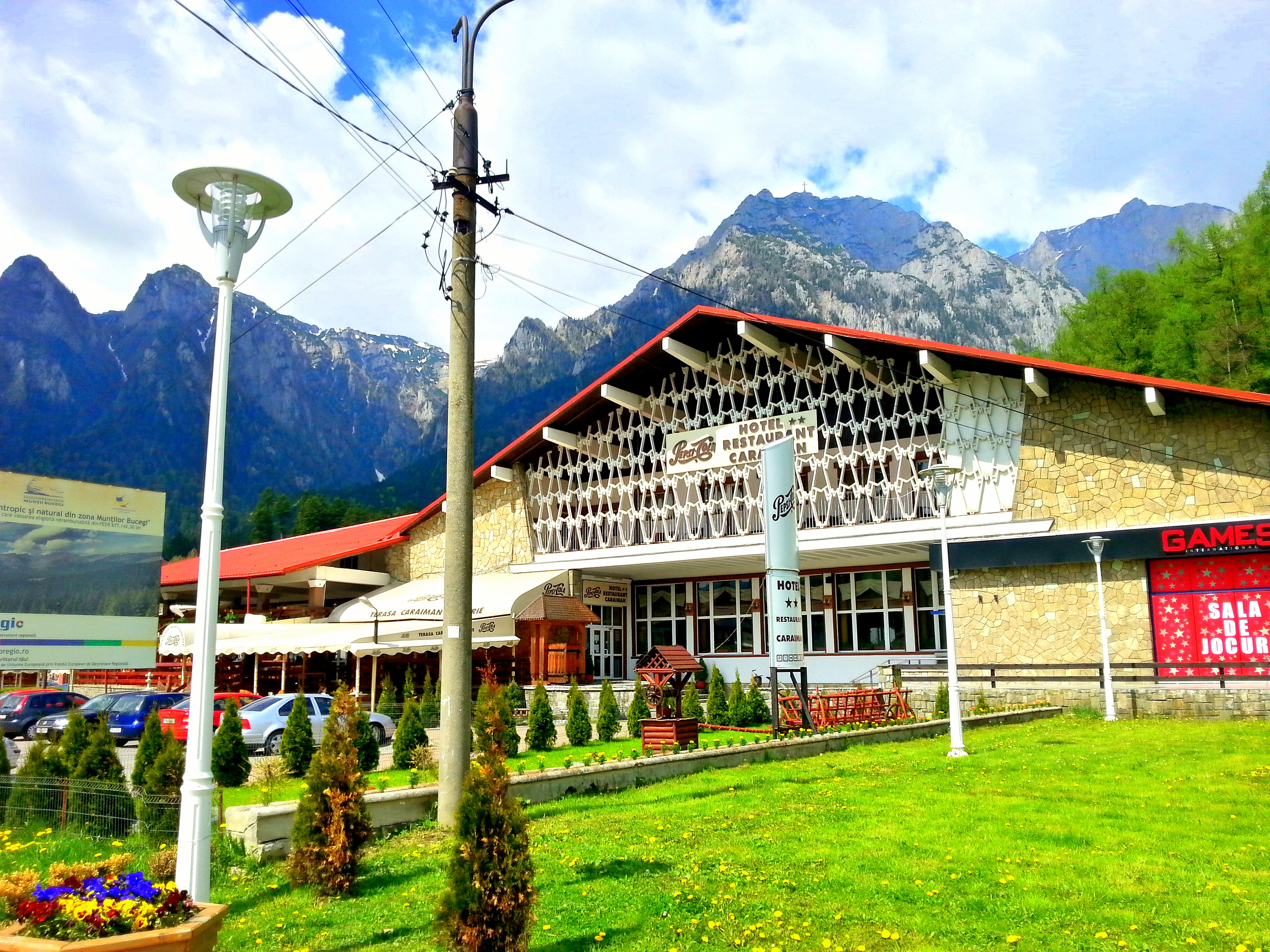
- Hotel Caraiman Bușteni

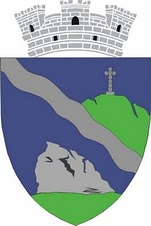
- Coat of arms

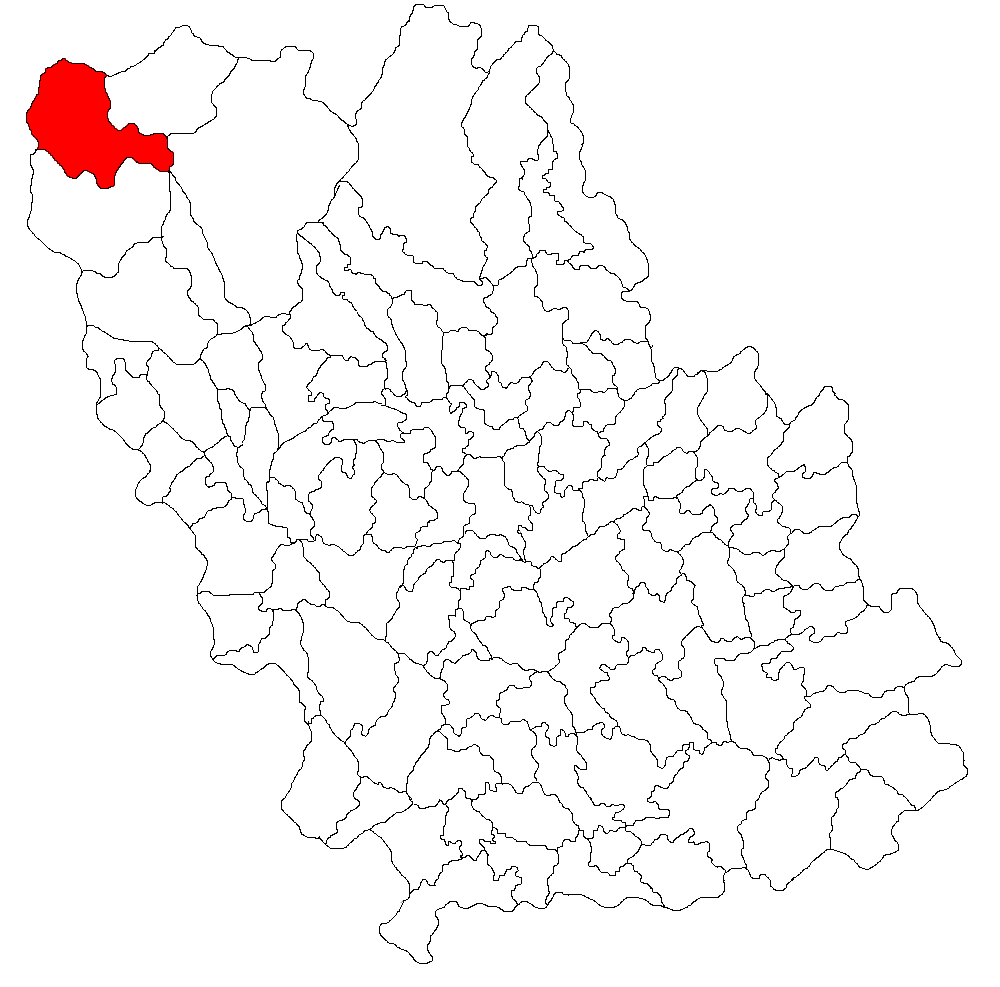
- Location in Prahova County

- Location in Romania
- Coordinates: 45°24′42″N 25°32′14″E
- Country: Romania
- County: Prahova

Government
  - Mayor (2024–2028): Emanoil Savin (PSD)
- Area: 75.28 km^{2} (29.07 sq mi)
- Elevation: 875 m (2,871 ft)
- Population (2021-12-01): 8,368
  - Density: 111.2/km^{2} (287.9/sq mi)
- Time zone: UTC+02:00 (EET)
  - Summer (DST): UTC+03:00 (EEST)
- Postal code: 105500
- Vehicle reg.: PH
- Website: www.orasul-busteni.ro

Bușteni (Romanian pronunciation: [buʃˈtenʲ]) is a small mountain town in the north of Prahova County, Muntenia, Romania. It is located in the Prahova Valley, at the bottom of the Bucegi Mountains, that have a maximum altitude of 2,505 m (8,219 ft). Its name literally means tree-logs in Romanian. One village, Poiana Țapului, is administratively part of the town, formerly a separate commune prior to 1950. According to the 2021 census, it has 8,368 inhabitants.

Bușteni's average altitude is 875 m (2,871 ft). It is one of the most popular mountain resorts in Romania, with year-round tourism opportunities, including skiing and mountain climbing.

3D view of Bușteni

The town and the surrounding mountains were the site of military confrontations in 1916, during World War I (see Romania during World War I). A large commemorative monument (about 25 m (82 ft) high), Heroes' Cross (Crucea Eroilor) lies atop nearby Caraiman Peak, at nearly 2,260 m (7,410 ft). The monument is lighted at night and is visible from virtually everywhere in Bușteni.

The mountains are also the home of several other rock formations that have become tourist attractions. A notable one is the Sphinx, which is named for its resemblance to the Great Sphinx of Giza. Another rock formation is Babele, a structure in the same area.

The main local industries are wood industry and tourism. Many holiday houses have been built in the town since the 2000s.

== Climate ==
Bușteni has a cold and temperate climate. With an average of roughly 4°C throughout the year, the warmest month in Bușteni, being August, averages 14 °C. In contrast, its coldest month, January, averages −6.3 °C. With rain being more common in its warmer months, Bușteni gets about 999 mm or 39.3 in. of rain per year. Summer in Bușteni begins in June and ends in September. Bușteni experiences approximately 2,567.5 hours of sunshine per year with January averaging the 4.6 hours and July averaging the highest at 9.8 hours.

Climate data for Bușteni
Month	Jan	Feb	Mar	Apr	May	Jun	Jul	Aug	Sep	Oct	Nov	Dec	Year
Mean daily maximum °C (°F)	−2.6 (27.3)	−1.1 (30.0)	2.4 (36.3)	7.7 (45.9)	13 (55)	16.4 (61.5)	18.3 (64.9)	18.4 (65.1)	13.9 (57.0)	9.3 (48.7)	4.5 (40.1)	−0.7 (30.7)	8.3 (46.9)
Daily mean °C (°F)	−6.3 (20.7)	−5 (23)	−1.6 (29.1)	3.5 (38.3)	8.8 (47.8)	12.5 (54.5)	14.3 (57.7)	14.4 (57.9)	9.9 (49.8)	5.3 (41.5)	1 (34)	−4.2 (24.4)	4.4 (39.9)
Mean daily minimum °C (°F)	−9.8 (14.4)	−8.6 (16.5)	−5.7 (21.7)	−0.9 (30.4)	4.3 (39.7)	8.2 (46.8)	10.1 (50.2)	10.3 (50.5)	6.2 (43.2)	1.8 (35.2)	−2 (28)	−7.4 (18.7)	0.5 (32.9)
Average precipitation mm (inches)	46 (1.8)	44 (1.7)	62 (2.4)	93 (3.7)	134 (5.3)	138 (5.4)	136 (5.4)	110 (4.3)	74 (2.9)	59 (2.3)	52 (2.0)	51 (2.0)	999 (39.2)
Source: https://en.climate-data.org/europe/romania/prahova/busteni-12798/

== Notable Individuals ==
Historical population
Year	Pop.	±%
1948	4,552	—
1956	8,591	+88.7%
1966	10,781	+25.5%
1977	12,223	+13.4%
1992	12,486	+2.2%
2002	11,787	−5.6%
2011	8,894	−24.5%
2021	8,368	−5.9%
Source: Census data

=== Natives ===
- Ovidiu Bali, boxer
- Ion Cașa, alpine skier
- Marian Chițescu, bobsledder
- Dan Cristea, skier
- Victor Fontana, biathlete
- Vasile Ionescu, alpine skier
- Eugenia Moldoveanu, soprano
- Alina Vera Savin, bobsledder
- Emanoil Savin, politician
- Robert Taleanu, luger

=== Honorary citizens ===
- Ana Maria Brânză, fencer
- Alina Dumitru, judoka
- Simona Halep, tennis player
- Adrian Mutu, footballer

== International relations ==
Bușteni is twinned with:

- Moissy-Cramayel, France, since 1993
- Djerba-Midoun, Tunisia, since 2000

== Image gallery ==
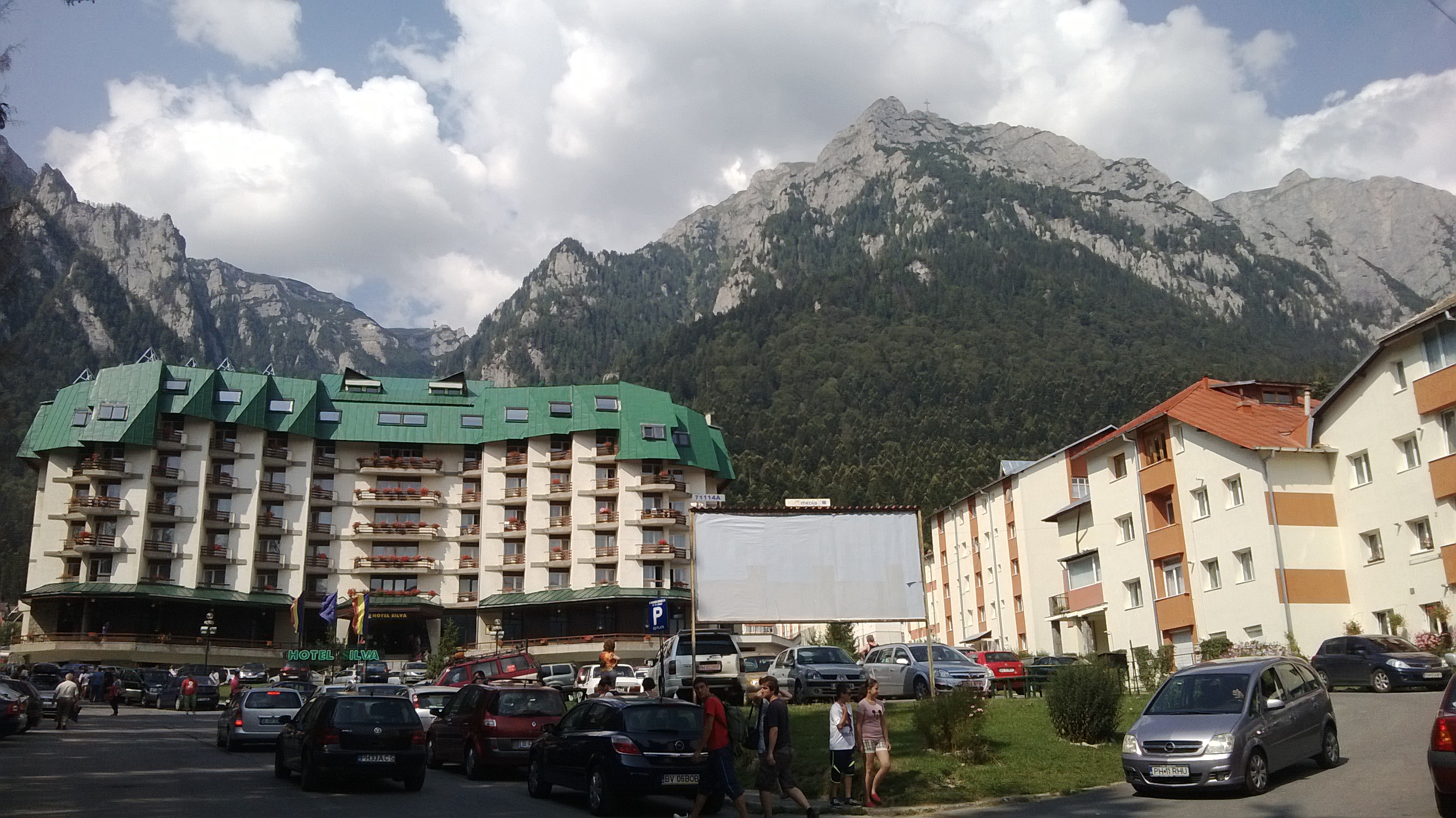
Bușteni and the Bucegi Mountains

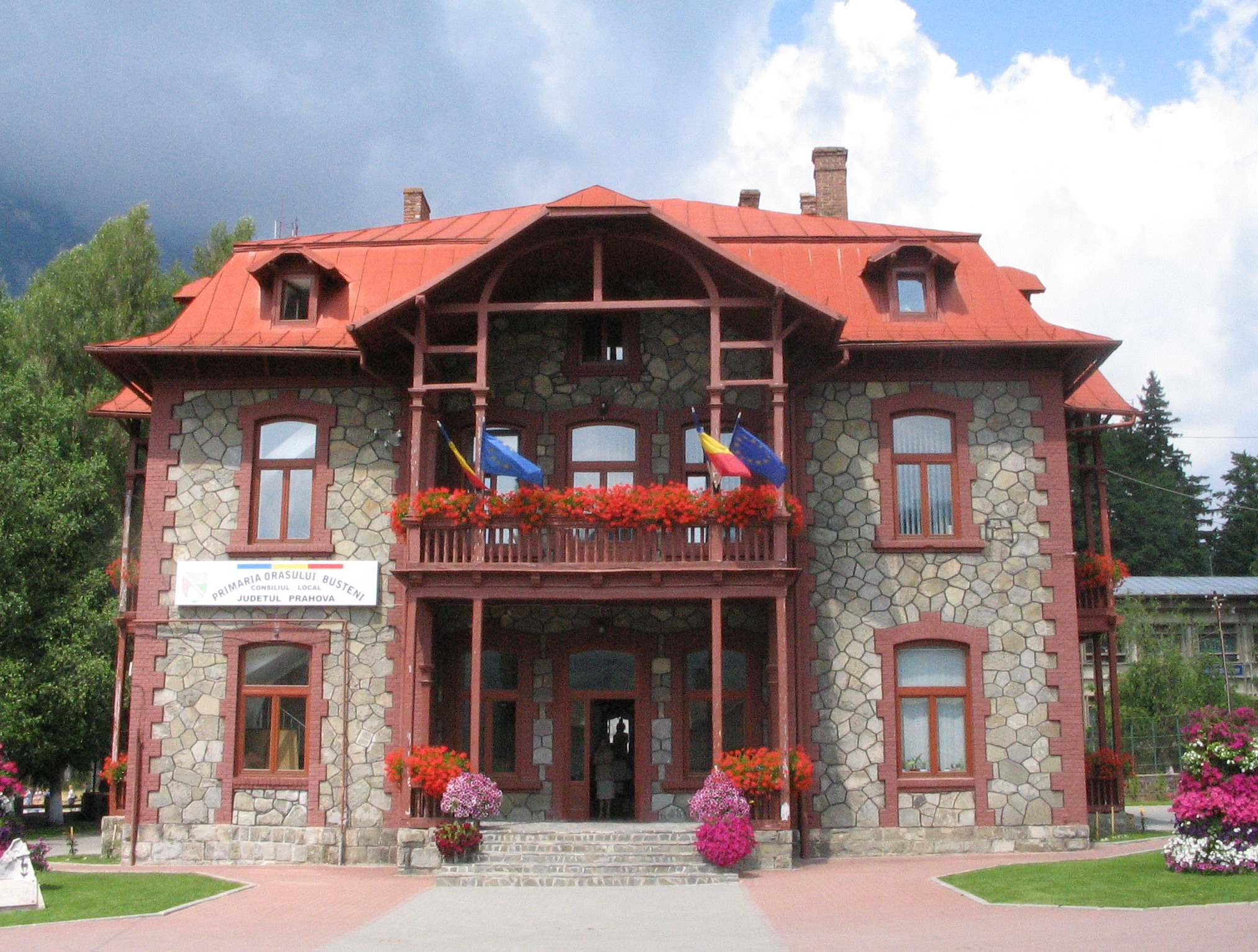
City Hall

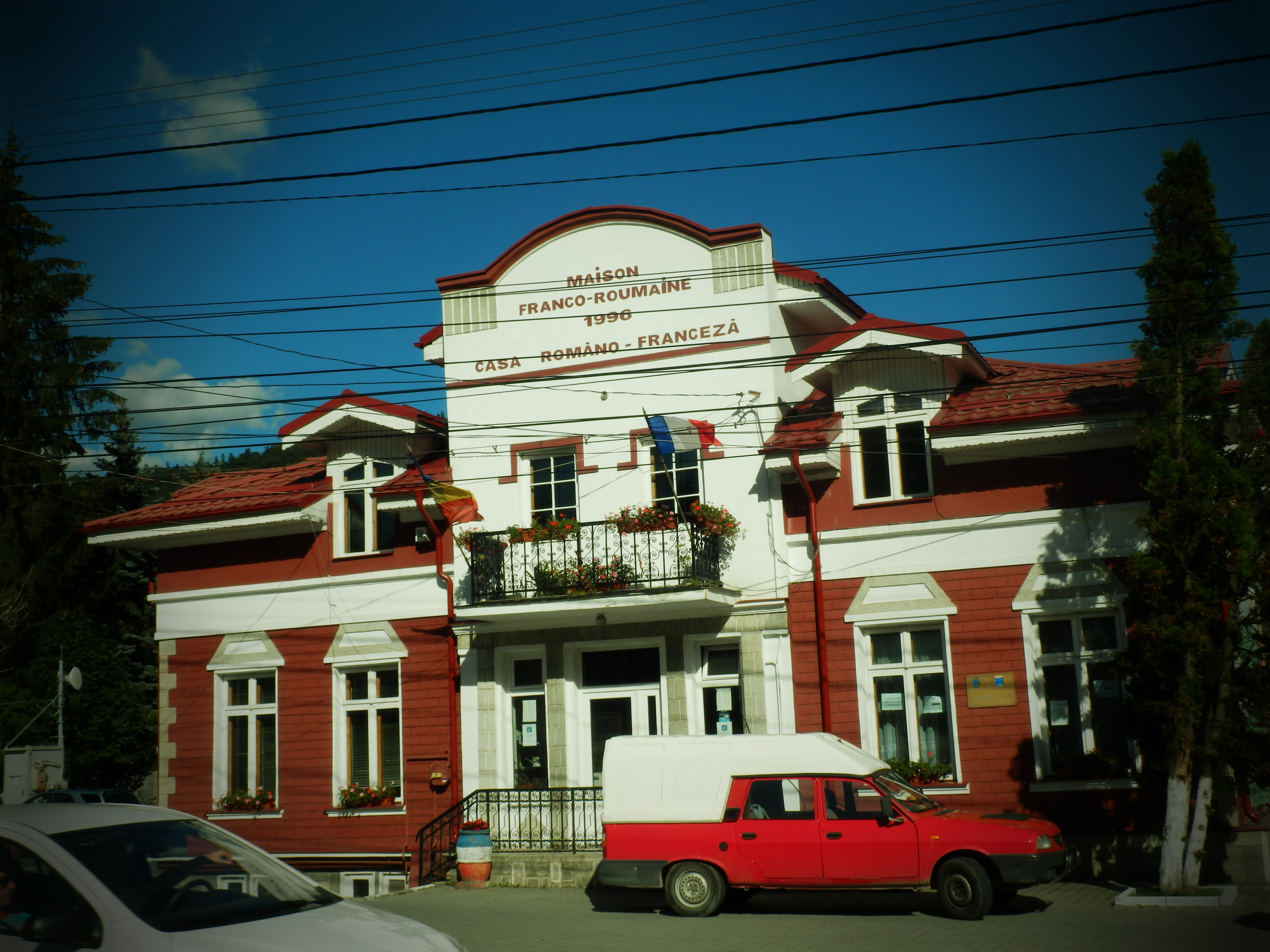
Romanian-French House

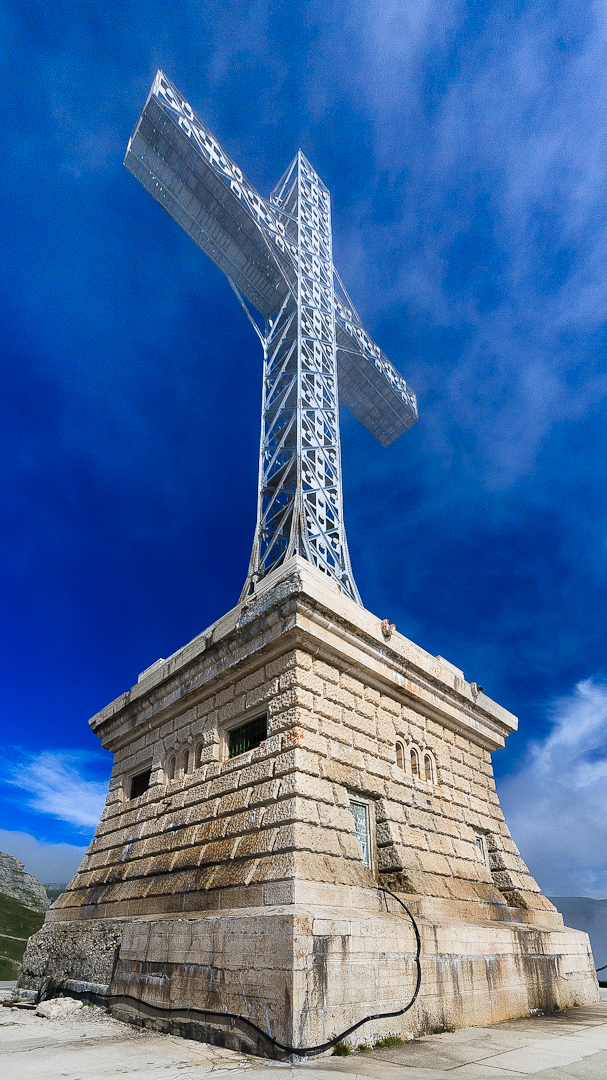
Caraiman Cross

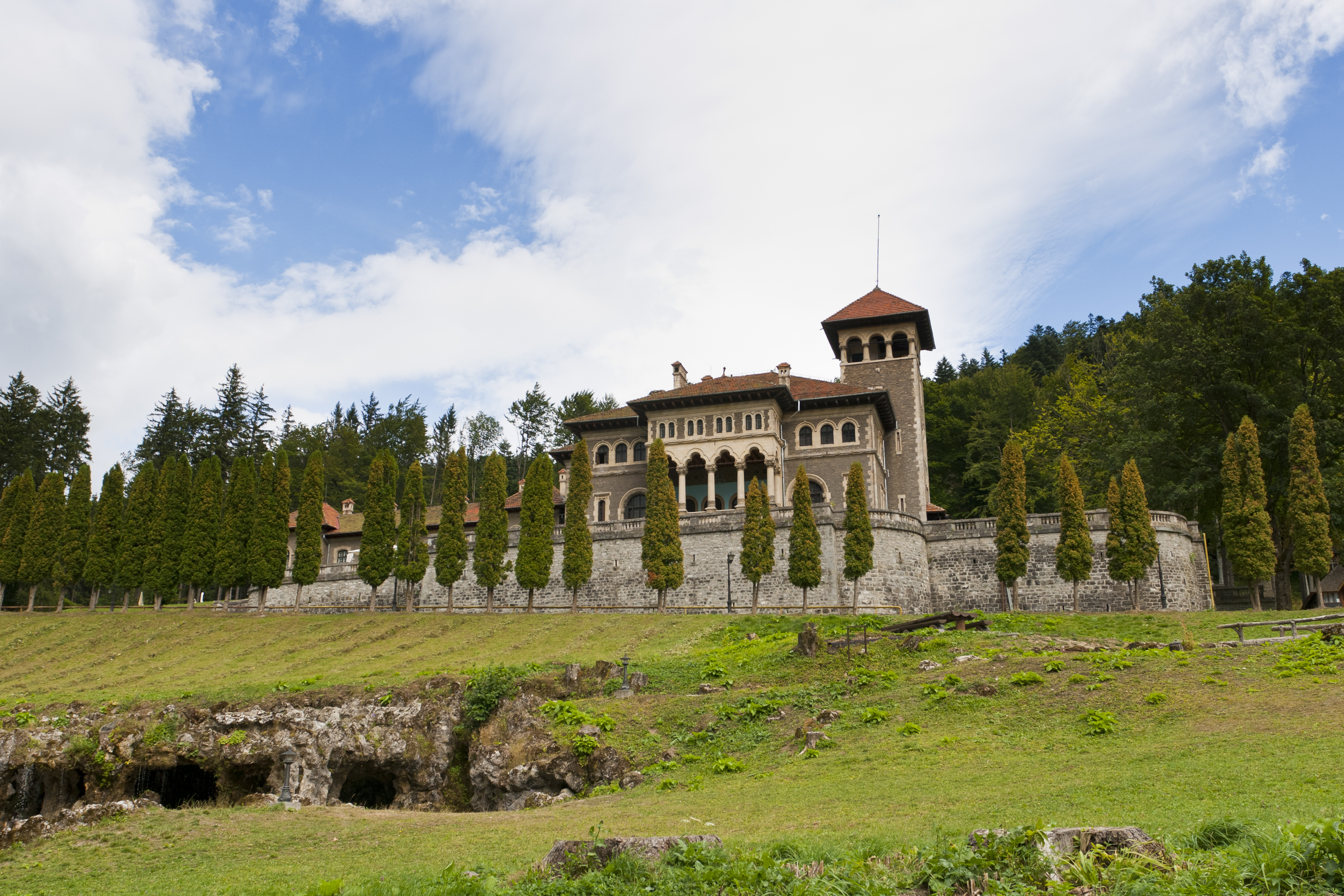
Cantacuzino Castle

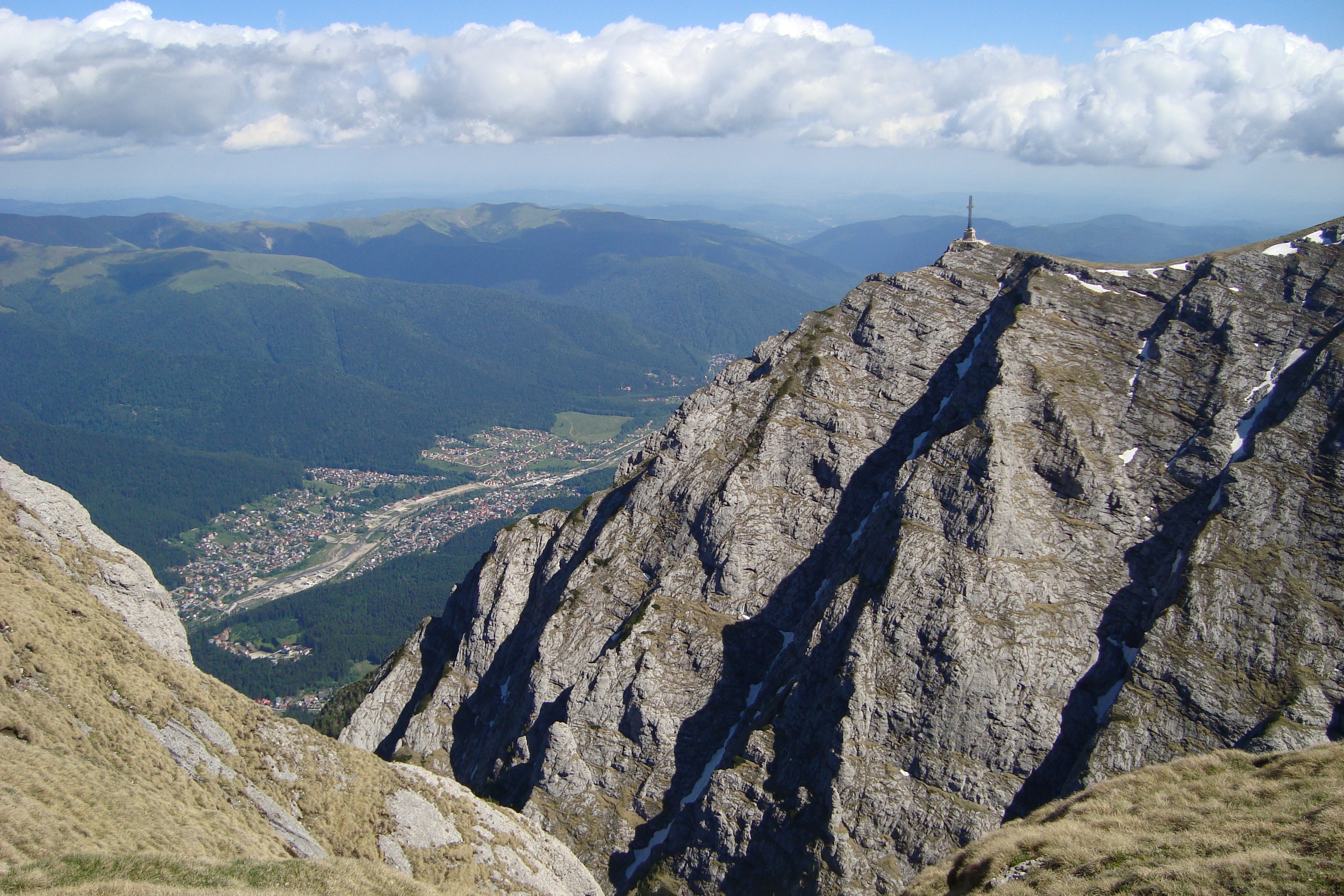
Heroes' Cross and Bușteni
