= Caraiman Peak =

Peak in the Bucegi Mountains of Romania

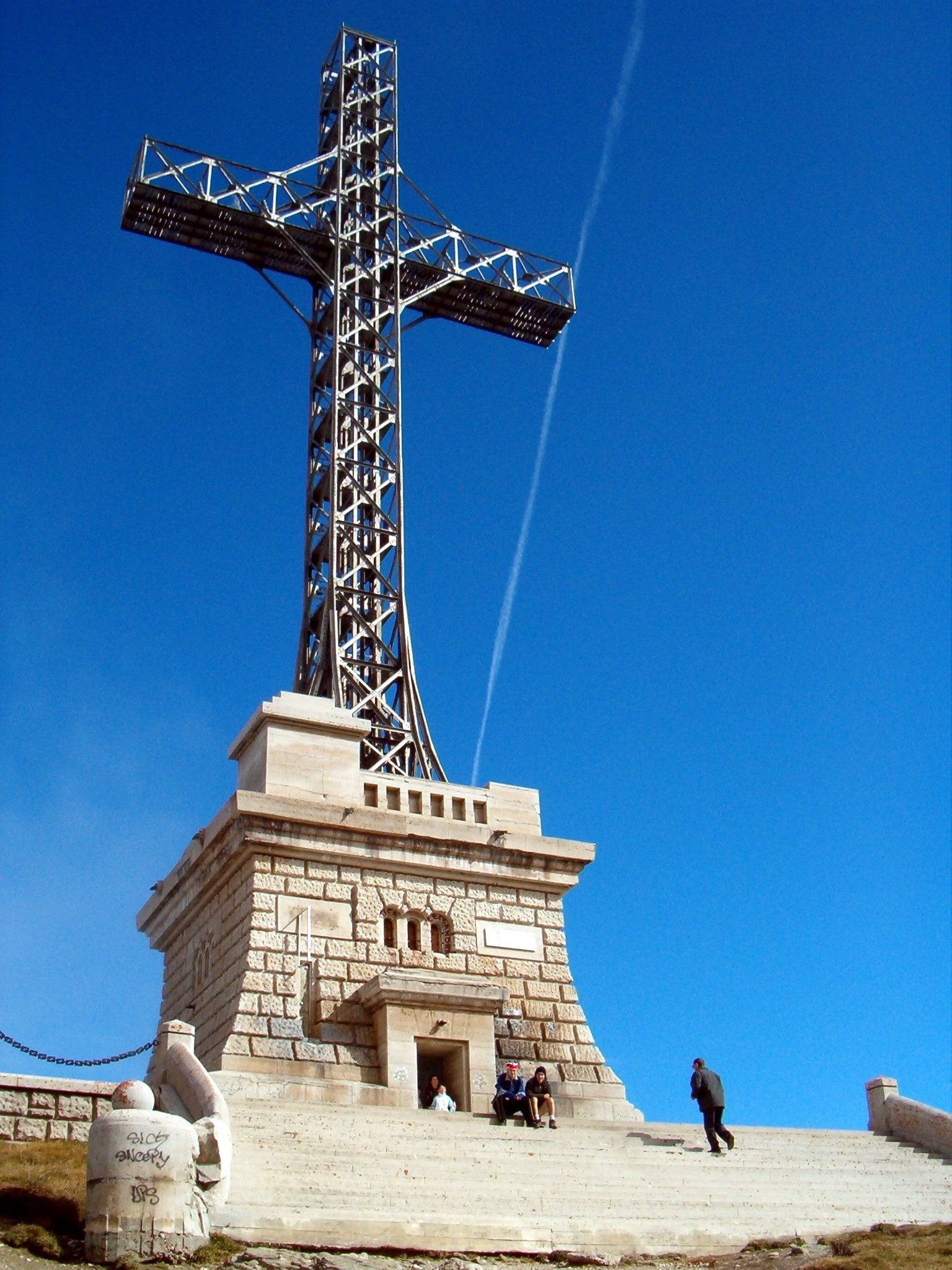
- The Heroes' Cross, monument located close to Caraiman Peak

Highest point
- Elevation: 2,384 m (7,822 ft)
- Coordinates: 45°24′22.21″N 25°29′51.72″E

Geography
- Location: Romania
- Parent range: Bucegi Mountains, Southern Carpathians

The Caraiman Peak is a mountain peak located in Romania, in the Bucegi Mountains of the Southern Carpathians. It has a height of 2,384 m. The nearest town is Buşteni.

== The Heroes' Monument ==
Close to Caraiman peak lies the Heroes' Cross, a memorial of World War I. It was erected between 1926 and 1928, and was initiated by Queen Maria of Romania. The material needed for construction was carried up using a funicular, as well as carts carried by oxen. The monument's height is 29.5 meters and the arms' length is 14 meters. The cross was built at an altitude of 2291 m.

The cross is lit at night using 300 500 W bulbs. Until 1939, the lighting installation was powered by an electric generator located inside the base of the monument and was made up of only 120 bulbs. In 1939, it was connected to the national electrical network.

== Gallery ==
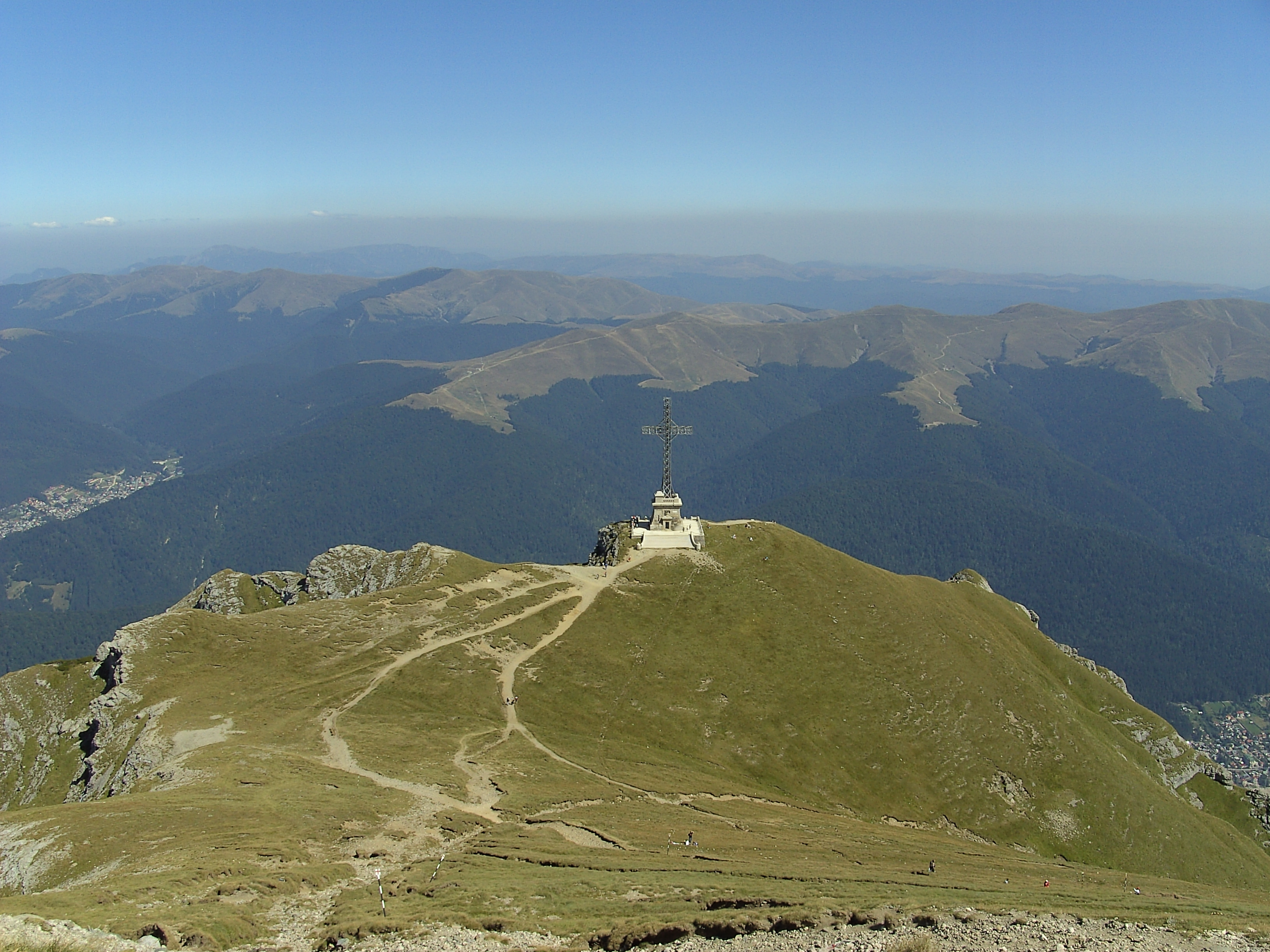
Heroes' Cross seen from actual Caraiman Peak

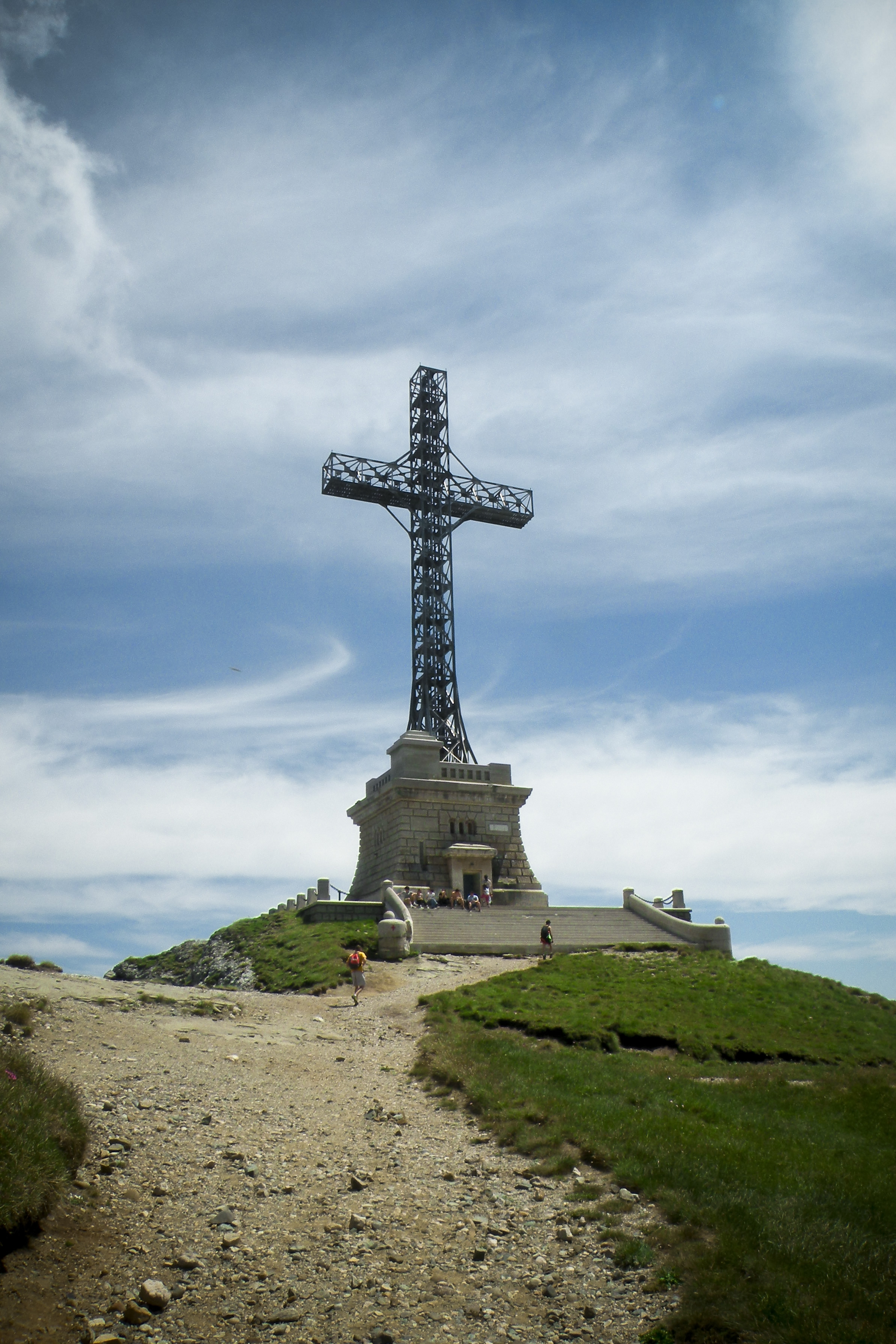

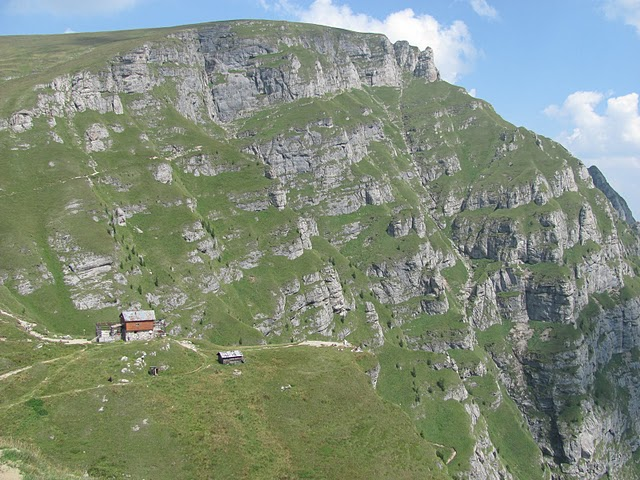
Caraiman cabin, situated near the peak

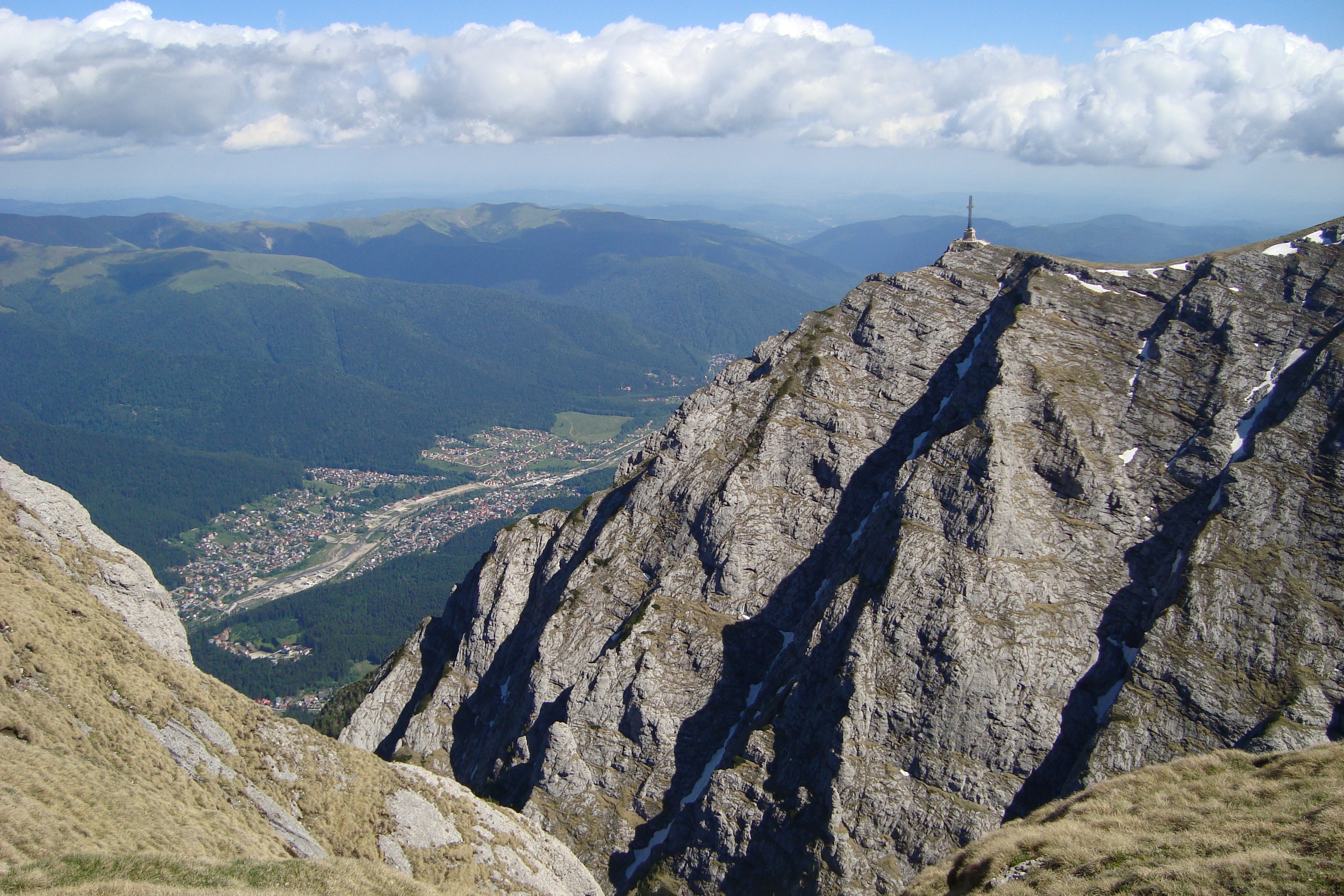
Heroes' Cross and Bușteni
