= Alexandrina (name) =

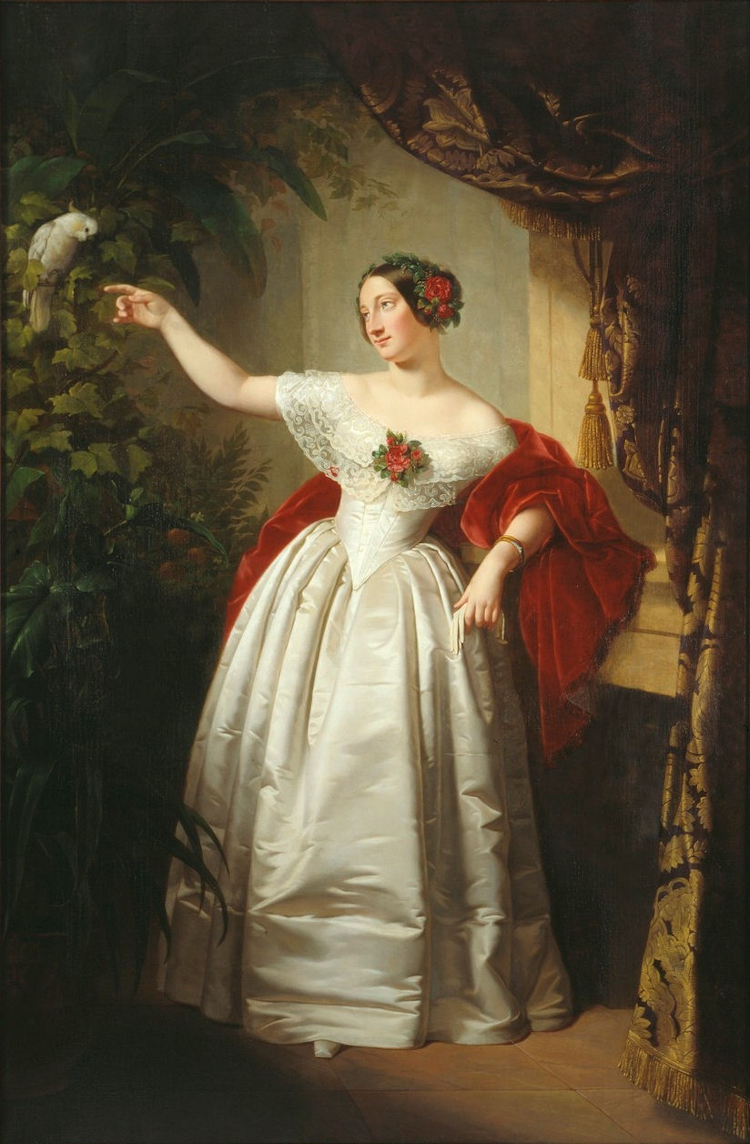
- Alexandrine of Baden was a bearer of the German version of Alexandrina.
- Pronunciation: English: /ælɪɡˈzændrinə/ Brazilian Portuguese: [aleˈʃɐ̃dɾinə]
- Gender: Feminine
- Language: Portuguese, English, Romanian, Catalan, Basque, German

Origin
- Origin: Greece
- Meaning: Petite protector of mankind

Other names
- Variant form: Alexina (apocopated form)
- Nickname: Nina
- Related names: Alexandra
- See also: Alexander

Alexandrina is feminine given name, originates from the Latin Alexandrina, the feminine counterpart of Alexandrinus. This, in turn, is derived from the Greek Alexandrînos (Ἀλεξανδρῖνος), a compound name formed by Aléxandros (Ἀλέξανδρος) and the suffix -înos (-ῖνος). Alexandrina was a recurrent name within the Germanic aristocracy, and its prominence extended to the British aristocracy, notably exemplified by Queen Victoria, whose birth name was Alexandrina Victoria.

Alexandrina, as an elaborated form of the feminine Alexandra, derives from the masculine name Alexander. The significance of Alexandrina is imbued with a more romantic and delicate connotation, with the suffix -ina—a derivational morpheme—suggesting the endearing sense of "little Alexandra" or "petite protector of mankind."

The name Alexandrina manifests in various forms across different linguistic traditions, including Alexandrine (German, French, Dutch), Alessandrina (Italian), Alejandrina (Spanish), Aleksandrina (Russian, Bulgarian), among others. Alexandrina also has the apocopated variant Alexina, which appears in Dutch and German; in French, it also occurs in the spelling Alexine.

In the religious sense, the name Alexandrina was the name of the Catholic blessed Alexandrina of Balazar.

== Personalities ==
- Alexandrina Cernov (1943–2024), Ukrainian Romanian academic, literary historian and philologist
- Alexandrina Chezan (born 1939), Romanian volleyball player
- Alexandrina Robertson Harris (1886–1978), Scottish–born American miniature painter
- Alexandrina Maria da Costa (1904–1955), Portuguese mystic of the Eucharist
- Alexandrina Pendatchanska (born 1970), Bulgarian soprano boasting a very dark dramatic timbre
- Alexandrina Matilda MacPhail (1860–1946), Scottish doctor
- Queen Victoria, born Alexandrina Victoria (1819–1901)
- Princess Alexandrina of Baden (1820–1904)
- Alexandrina Cantacuzino (1876–1944), Romanian political activist
- Alexandrina Hristov (born 1978), Romanian singer
- Alexandrina Jay (born 1949), British social worker and academic
- Alexandrina Andre, Documentary film director

Alexandrina may also refer to:

- Lady Alexandrina de Courcy, a character in the novel Doctor Thorne by Anthony Trollope

== See also ==
- Alexandrina (disambiguation)
