= Alexandrine (disambiguation) =

"Alexandrine" is an adjective largely synonymous with "Alexandrian". It may refer to:

== Literature ==
- An alexandrine, a twelve-syllable line of poetry; exhibiting slightly different characteristics in different languages:
  - French alexandrine
  - Polish alexandrine
  - Czech alexandrine

== People ==
- Alexandrine Le Normant d'Étoilles (1744-1754), daughter of Madame de Pompadour
- Alexandrine of Baden (1820-1904), eldest child of Leopold, Grand Duke of Baden and Sophie of Sweden
- Alexandrine of Mecklenburg-Schwerin (1879-1952), consort of King Christian X of Denmark
- Alexandrine "Alexine" Tinne (1835-1869), Dutch photographer and explorer in Africa
- Alexandrine von Schönerer (1850–1919), Austrian theater owner, managing director and actress
- Princess Alexandrine of Prussia (1803-1892), Grand Duchess of Mecklenburg-Schwerin
- Princess Alexandrine of Prussia (1842-1906), daughter of Prince Albert of Prussia
- Alexandrine-Caroline Branchu (1780-1850), French opera soprano
- Rose-Alexandrine Barreau (1773–1843), French soldier

== Other ==
- Alexandrine parakeet (Psittacula eupatria), a mainly green parrot native to Southeast Asia

== See also ==
- Alexandrina (disambiguation)
- Alexandrian (disambiguation)
