= Stella Maxwell =

Belgian model (born 1990)

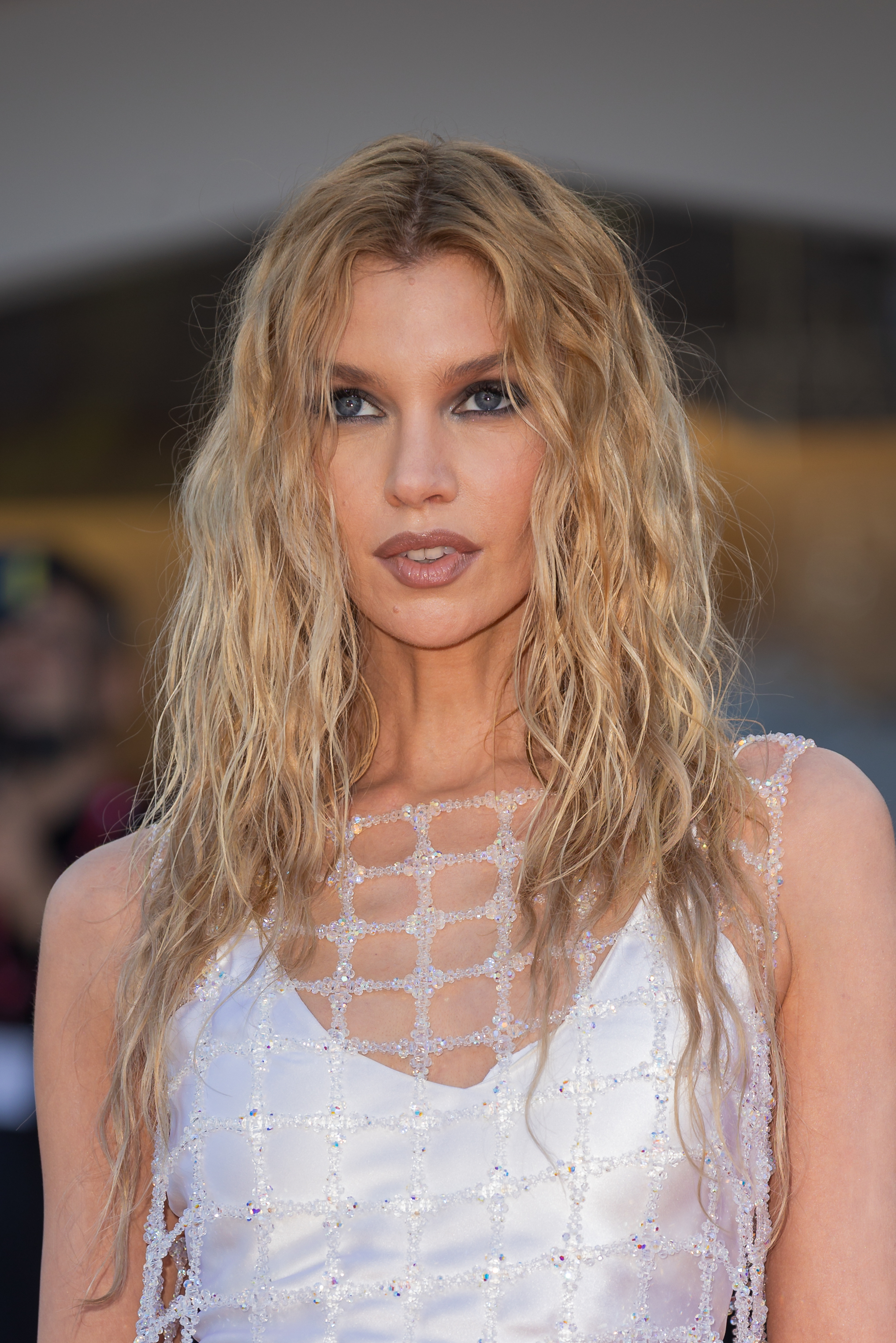
- Maxwell in the Venice Film Festival in September 2025
- Born: 15 May 1990 (age 36); Brussels, Belgium
- Occupation: Model
- Modelling information
- Height: 5 ft 10 1/2 in (1.79 m)
- Hair colour: Blonde
- Eye colour: Blue
- Agency: The Society Management; Elite Model Management; Kate Moss Agency

Stella Maynes Maxwell (born 15 May 1990) is a Belgian-born Northern Irish-New Zealand model. A former Victoria's Secret Angel, she was also the face of Max Factor.

== Early life ==
Stella Maynes Maxwell was born in Brussels on 15 May 1990, the daughter of Northern Irish parents from Belfast. Her mother is Stella (née Maynes) and her father is retired diplomat Maurice Maxwell, who served as the former head of the European Commission in Belfast. Maxwell was named after her mother. She has two older brothers and an older sister. She was raised in Brussels until she was 13 years old, attending the European School, Woluwe. She then moved with her family to Australia, where they lived in Canberra for a year. They then moved to New Zealand when she was 14, settling in Wellington. She attended Queen Margaret College and the University of Otago. While working at a newsstand as a college student, she was scouted by a modeling agency based in Dunedin. She began modeling after graduating from university.

Although Maxwell was born in Belgium and had an international childhood, she has both British and Irish nationalities.

== Career ==
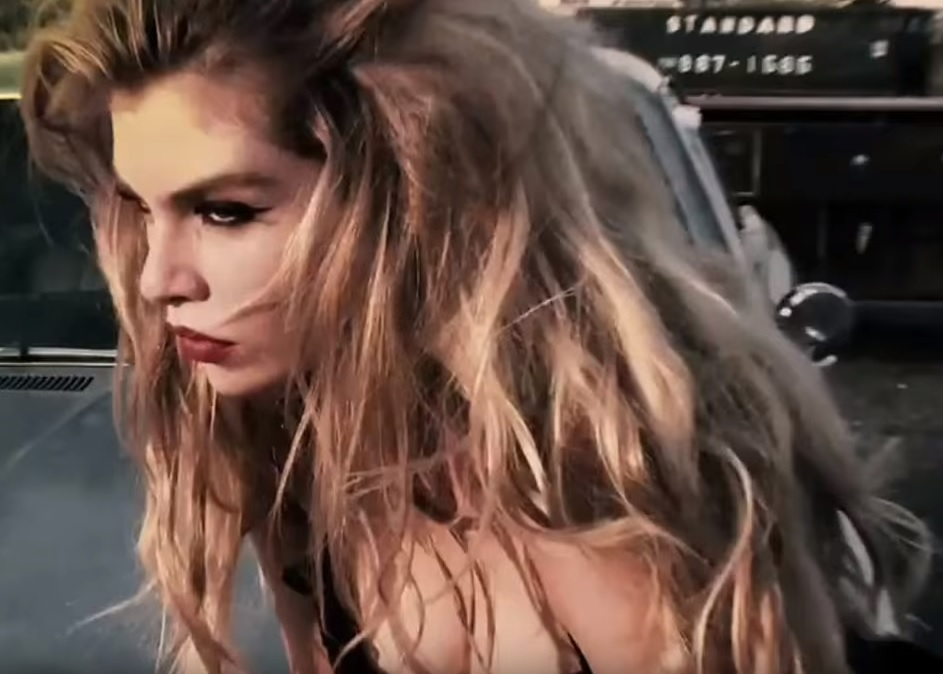
Maxwell for Love magazine in 2015

She walked the Victoria's Secret Fashion Show 2014 where she was credited. She has been a Victoria's Secret Angel since 2015.

During her career, she has posed for Alexander McQueen, Asos, H&M, Karl Lagerfeld, Roberto Cavalli, Urban Outfitters and Topshop, and has been featured on the covers of the German, Turkish, Spanish, Thai and Japanese editions of the fashion magazine Vogue. As a catwalk model, she has walked for Jeremy Scott, Marc Jacobs, Tommy Hilfiger, Moschino, Brandon Maxwell, Dolce & Gabbana, Jacquemus, Tory Burch, Giles, Dsquared2, Mugler, Fendi, Chanel, Miu Miu, 032c and Versace. She notably opened the Concept Korea Spring/Summer 2011 fashion show, during which she was dressed as a Lolita-esque modern day Snow White in hoody, miniskirt and towering shoes.

Maxwell collaborated with the French brand The Kooples to create a handbag, named after her. In 2016, she was voted No. 1 in 2016 Maxim's "Hot 100 List". She had an uncredited role in the 2018 film JT LeRoy.

In 2020, Maxwell became an ambassador for Pride Live's Stonewall Day events.

Maxwell appears in the 2021 music video "Chemical" by Beck.

After 7 years, she returned to the Victoria's Secret Fashion Show 2025.

== Personal life ==
Maxwell is fluent in both English and French.

Maxwell is openly queer, and identifies as sexually fluid. She briefly dated American singer Miley Cyrus in 2015. Between December 2016 to 2019, she was in an on off relationship with American actress Kristen Stewart. In 2019, Maxwell was in a brief relationship with model and illustrator Langley Fox. In May 2019, Maxwell had a brief relationship with former One Direction member Liam Payne.

== Sources ==
- Max-Factor : The Max Factor Story
- Kristen Stewart Gate-Crashed Our Exclusive Interview With Stella Maxwell
- Victoria's Secret : Victoria's Secret
