= Constantin Istrati =

Romanian chemist and physician

Constantin I. Istrati
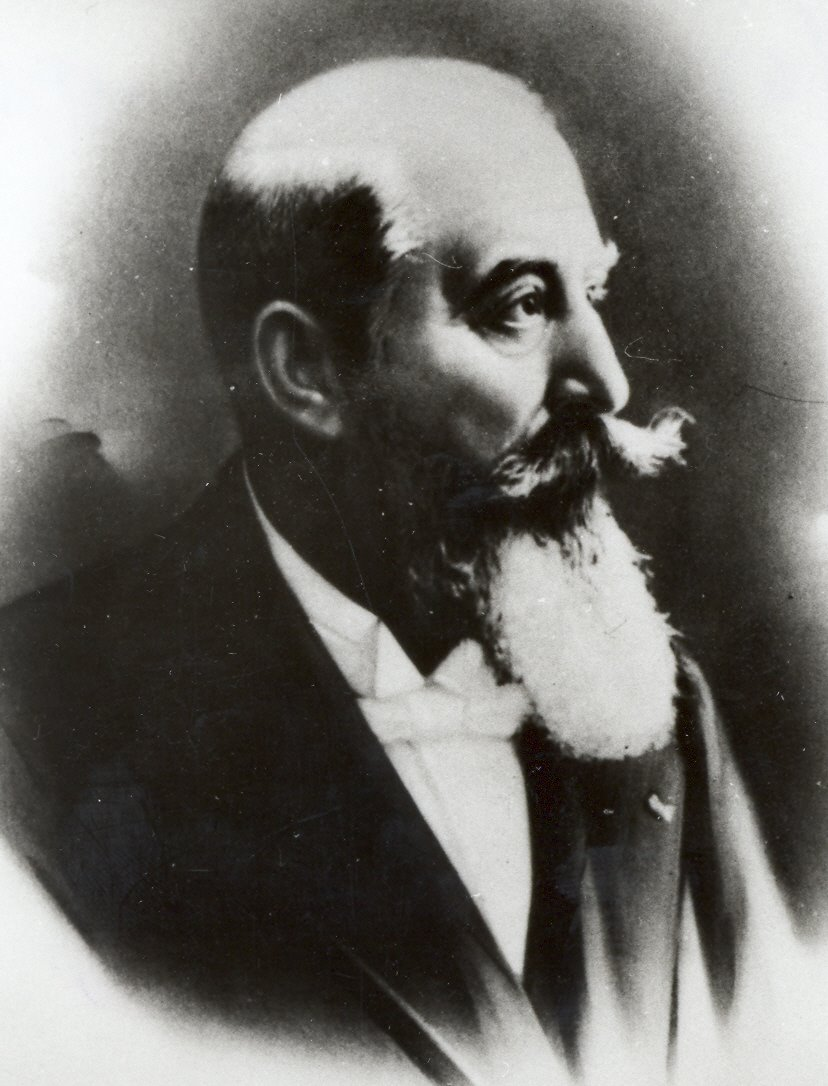
- Constantin I. Istrati

Mayor of Bucharest
- In office October 1912 – March 1913
- Preceded by: Dimitrie Dobrescu
- Succeeded by: Grigore Gheorghe Cantacuzino

Romanian Minister of Agriculture, Industry, Trade, and Domains
- In office February 26, 1907 – March 12, 1907
- Prime Minister: Gheorghe Grigore Cantacuzino

Romanian Minister of Public Works
- In office April 11, 1899 – January 9, 1900
- Prime Minister: Gheorghe Grigore Cantacuzino

Personal details
- Born: 7 September 1850 Roman, Moldavia (present-day Romania)
- Died: 17 January 1919 (aged 68) Paris, France
- Education: Academia Mihăileană; University of Medicine and Pharmacy; University of Paris

Academic background
- Thesis: On colored ethylbenzene and some observations about boiling points in the aromatic series (1885)
- Doctoral advisor: Charles Adolphe Wurtz and Charles Friedel

Constantin I. Istrati (7 September 1850 – 17 January 1919) was a Romanian chemist, physician, and politician. He was Minister of Public Works in 1899–1900, Minister of Agriculture, Industry, Trade, and Domains in 1907, Mayor of Bucharest in 1912–1913, and President of the Romanian Academy between 1913 and 1916.

== Biography ==
He was born in 1850 in Roman, Moldavia (now in Neamț County, Romania). He studied at the Academia Mihăileană in Iași, after which he went to Bucharest to study at the University of Medicine and Pharmacy, graduating in 1869, and obtaining his M.D. in 1877. After collaborating with Carol Davila, Istrati pursued his studies for three years at the University of Paris, where he obtained in 1885 a Ph.D. in Chemistry under the direction of Charles Adolphe Wurtz and Charles Friedel, with thesis On colored ethylbenzene and some observations about boiling points in the aromatic series.

In 1883 he was named Professor of Physics at the School of Bridges and Roads in Bucharest, replacing Emanoil Bacaloglu. On April 1, 1889, Istrati was elected corresponding member of the Romanian Academy. Istrati later became a professor at the University of Bucharest, where he introduced the teaching of organic chemistry.

He served as Minister of Public Works in the first government of Gheorghe Grigore Cantacuzino (April 11, 1899 to January 9, 1900), and as Minister of Agriculture, Industry, Trade, and Domains in the second Cantacuzino government (February 26 to March 12, 1907). From October 1912 to March 1913, he served as Mayor of Bucharest.

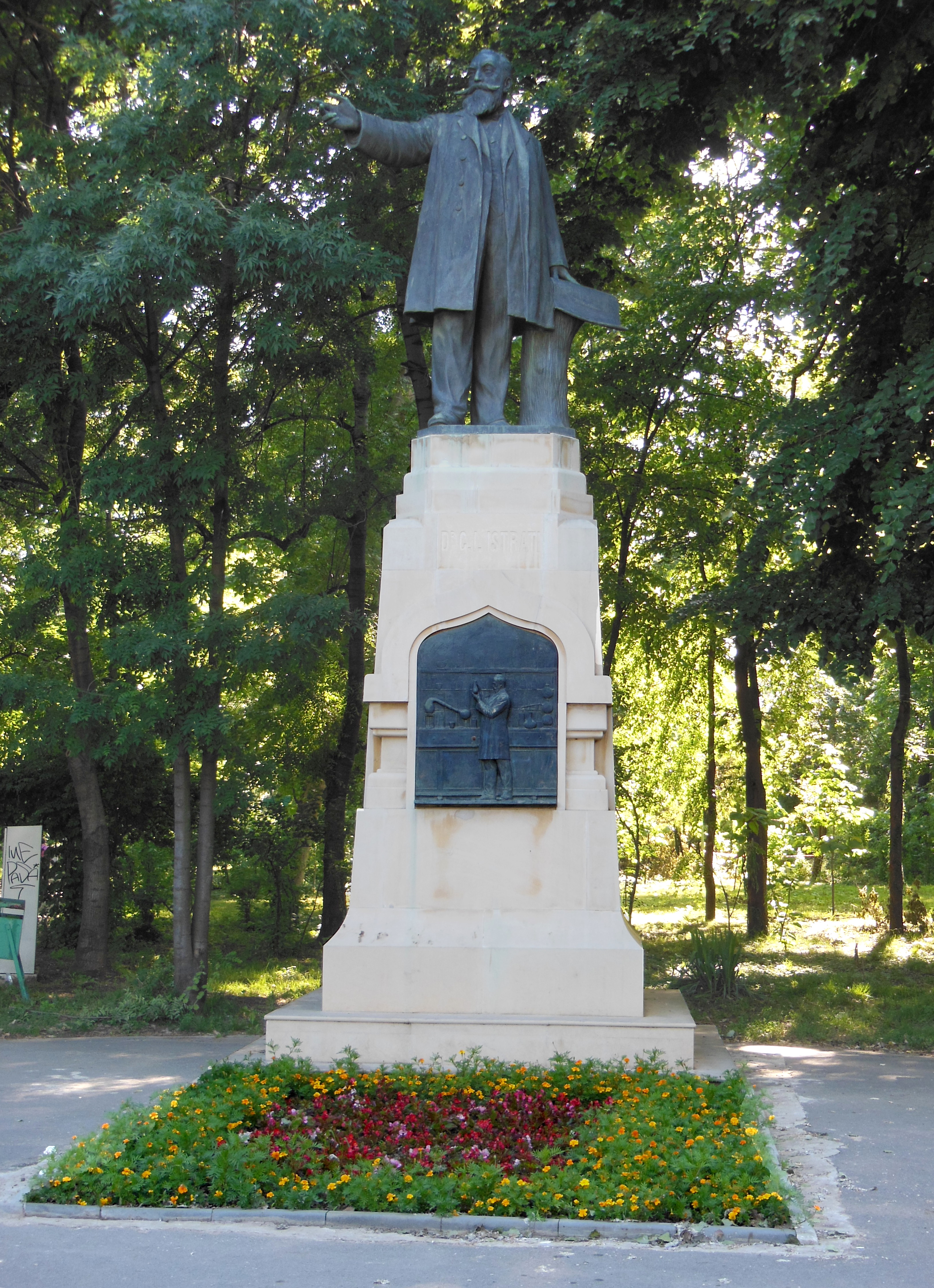
Statue of Istrati in Carol Park, Bucharest

Istrati died in Paris in 1919. He is buried at Bellu Cemetery in Bucharest; next to his tomb there is a bust of him, designed by the sculptor Raffaello Romanelli. Streets in Bucharest and Câmpina are named after him.

== Bibliography ==
- Academia Republicii Populare Române, Dicționar Enciclopedic Român, Editura Politică, București, 1962-1964
