= Grigore Gheorghe Cantacuzino =

Romanian Conservative politician

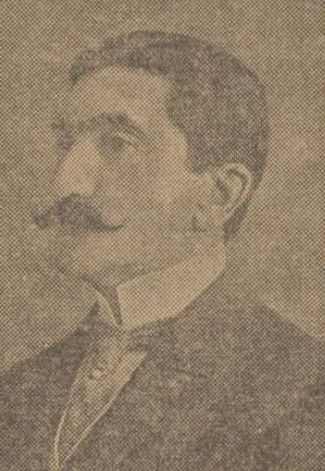

Mayor of Bucharest
- In office March 1913 – December 1913
- Preceded by: Constantin Istrati
- Succeeded by: Ion Gheorghe Saita

Personal details
- Born: 1872
- Died: 1930 (aged 57–58)
- Party: Conservative Party
- Spouse: Alexandrina Pallady
- Children: 1+, including Alexandru
- Parent: Gheorghe Cantacuzino (father)
- Relatives: Cantacuzino family Mihail G. Cantacuzino (brother)

Grigore Gheorghe Cantacuzino (1872 – 1930) was a Romanian Conservative politician who served as Mayor of Bucharest from March to December 1913. The son of Gheorghe Grigore Cantacuzino and brother of Mihail G. Cantacuzino, he married Alexandrina Pallady.

One of his sons, Alexandru Cantacuzino, became a prominent figure in Romania's fascist Legionary Movement.
