= Oldřich Vyhlídal =

Czech poet, translator and editor

Oldřich Vyhlídal (4 January 1921, Holešov – 14 May 1989, Prague) was a Czech poet, translator, and editor. He published several books of poetry.

Water played an important role in his imagery, as exemplified in the titles of several of his poetry collections: Řeka pod okny ("River under the windows"), Hnízda na vodě ("Nests on the water"), and Vodopád ("Waterfall"). He also translated old Korean poetry. In his poetry Oldřich Vyhlídal used fixed forms, like the French ballad, the pantun, and especially the sonnet. He frequently wrote in the Czech alexandrine.

== Works ==
Poetry

- Řeka pod okny (1956)
- Hnízda na vodě (1959)
- Ptáci nad Atlantidou (1963)
- Snímání podob (1966)
- Svatá rodina (1972)
- Pláňky (1977)
- Tatínkovy ruce (1978)
- Vodopád (1979)
- Cirkus (1981)
- Neodpustky (1982)
- A neopouštěj nás ("Don't Leave Us Alone") (1984) — A volume of selected verse with an afterword by Václav Kubín: "Život a dílo hledače pramenů vody živé" ("Life and Work of a Seeker for the Sources of the Water of Life")
- Svatební dar (1985)
- Ars poetica. Verše z nemoci (1988)
- Pantumy o marné lásce (1989)
- Dny a dna (1990)
