= Alexandrian =

Alexandrian may refer to:

- People, objects or culture of Alexandria, Egypt
- A regional stage in the Silurian geological period

== See also ==
- Alexandrine (disambiguation)
- Alexandrian Wicca
- Alexandria (disambiguation)
