= Daniel Naborowski =

Polish poet

Daniel Naborowski (1573–1640) was a Polish Baroque poet.

== Biography ==
Daniel Naborowski was born in Kraków. Like many Polish noblemen of the time, he was a Calvinist by faith. His education took place not only in Kraków, but also in Wittenberg (1590–1593) and Basel (1593–1595). In Basel he studied medicine, in Orléans he studied law, and from Galileo in Padua he learned military engineering. Once he returned to the Polish–Lithuanian Commonwealth, he joined the court of magnate Janusz Radziwiłł, where he became his secretary and physician. He was also magnate's diplomatic envoy, and often traveled abroad. After Janusz death, he moved to the court of his relative Krzysztof Radziwiłł.

He died in Vilna, where near the end of his life, he was appointed the city's judge.

Although some of his works were published in the 17th century (like On the eyes of the English princess who was married to Frederick, the pfaltzgrave of Rhein, elected the king of Bohemia, published in 1621), the majority of his poems were published only in 1961. Besides poems, Naborowski was a translator, and wrote letters, epitaphs, trifles and laments, mostly praising the country's peaceful life in the spirit of sarmatism. He translated three sonnets by Petrarch. He used in these poems Polish alexandrine instead of hendecasyllable, starting thus long tradition of writing sonnets in 13(7+5) metre.
