= Maria Tescanu Rosetti =

Romanian princess

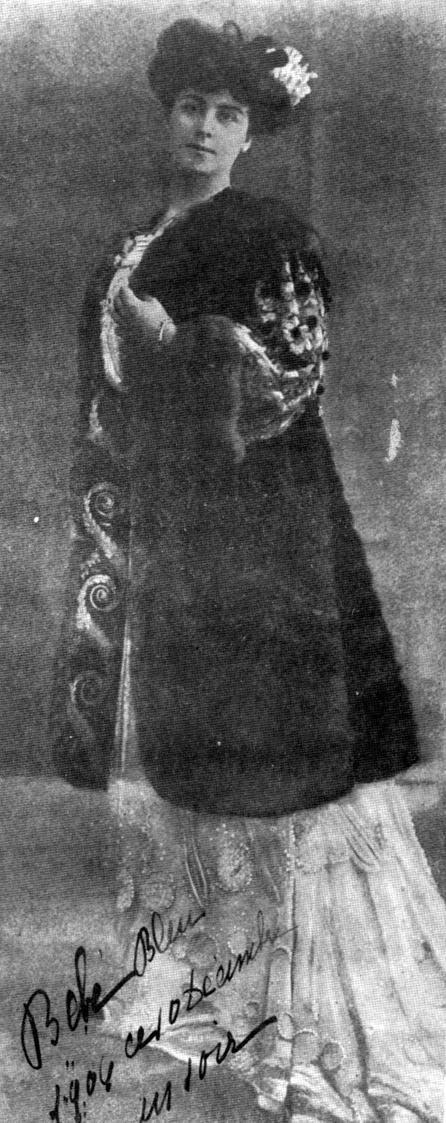
- Born: Maria Tescanu Rosetti; 18 July 1879; Berești-Tazlău, Bacău County, Romania
- Died: 23 December 1968 (aged 89); Geneva, Switzerland
- Burial place: Père Lachaise Cemetery, Paris
- Other name: Maruca Cantacuzino
- Occupation: Royal court official
- Spouse(s): Mihail G. Cantacuzino, George Enescu
- Children: Constantin Cantacuzino

Maria Tescanu Rosetti (1879–1968), was a Romanian aristocrat and royal court official.

== Life ==
Born in Berești-Tazlău, Bacău County, she was a descendant of some illustrious Moldavian boyar families. Her father, Dumitru, was descended from the Rosetti family, and her mother, Alice Rosetti-Tescanus, from the Negri-Jora, and both were well-known intellectuals. Dumitru was a philosopher, sociologist, publicist, and translator of Vasile Conta's work into French, and her mother, known to have collected "one of the most valuable libraries of the time", was a pianist and connoisseur of universal music and literature.

She spent her childhood and adolescence in Tescani and was schooled at home by governesses, who helped Maria acquire "a vast culture through reading, correspondence and travel."

She was a lady-in-waiting to queen Marie of Romania. At the age of 19, she married Mihail G. Cantacuzino, her first husband, and they became parents to the aviator Constantin Cantacuzino. Later, she was a lover of Nae Ionescu and later married composer George Enescu.

She moved in Romania's highest aristocratic circles and was befriended by Matila Ghyka, Jean Chryssoveloni, Martha Bibescu, Cella Delavrancea, Nae Ionescu and Alice Voinescu.

During World War I, she was a central figure in a scandal at an Iași hospital, where she was among those who had forced wounded soldiers to perform for her and her guests during banquets.

In February 1918, she was one of a group of female aristocrats who, supported by the queen, participated in a demonstration against the war policy of Prime Minister General Alexandru Averescu.

She died in Geneva at age 89 in 1968 and was buried at Père Lachaise Cemetery in Paris, next to the remains of her second husband, George Enescu.

== Work ==
Maria published her memoirs, written in French (Ombres et lumières. Souvenirs d´une Princesse Moldave/ Shadows and lights. Memories of a Moldavian princess), where she described the evolution of Romanian society from 1850 to 1953.
