= Alexandrina =

Alexandrina may refer to:

== Lakes ==
- Lake Alexandrina (New Zealand)
- Lake Alexandrina (South Australia)

== Other uses ==
- Bibliotheca Alexandrina, a library and cultural centre in Alexandria, Egypt
- Alexandrina (name), a feminine name
- Alexandrina Council, a local government area covering land on the west side of Lake Alexandrina in South Australia

== See also ==
- Alexandrine (disambiguation)
