= Pride Live =

American activist organization

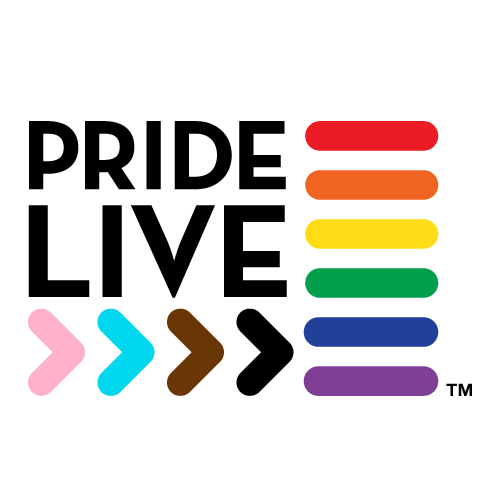
- Established: 2012
- Founder: Diana Rodriguez
- Type: LGBTQ+ Awareness Organization
- Location: Long Island City, Queens, New York City
- Region served: United States
- Executive Director: Diana Rodriguez
- Website: pridelive.org

Pride Live is a U.S. not-for-profit 501(c)(3) organization elevating awareness and support for the LGBTQIA+ community via campaign development and social advocacy.

== Campaigns ==
=== Stonewall Day ===
Stonewall Day is a global campaign launched in 2018 to elevate awareness and support for the Stonewall riots legacy and the continuing fight for LGBTQ+ equality.

The second annual Stonewall Day was held on June 28, 2019, the exact date of the 50th anniversary of the Stonewall Riots. Events featured a reception at the Stonewall Inn, a partnership with the New York Red Bulls and their Pride Night, and the Stonewall Day concert featuring performances by Alicia Keys and Alex Newell, and special appearances by Lady Gaga, Whoopi Goldberg, Donatella Versace, Josephine Skriver, Angelica Ross, Ryan Jamaal Swain, Geena Rocero, Blossom C. Brown, Chelsea Clinton, and Valerie Jarrett.

=== Stonewall Ambassadors ===
The Stonewall Ambassadors are a collective of activists, influencers, business leaders, academics, and celebrities who joined together in support of the 50th anniversary of the Stonewall Riots.

=== REBEL 628 ===
Launched in April 2019, REBEL628 is a multi-year initiative that will empower and advance the fight for LGBTQ+ equality, with a focus on engaging today's generations.

Founding members include Amber Wittington, Adam Rippon, Blossom Brown, David Cooley, Elliot Carlyle, and Levi Foster.
