= Mihail G. Cantacuzino =

Romanian politician (1867–1928)

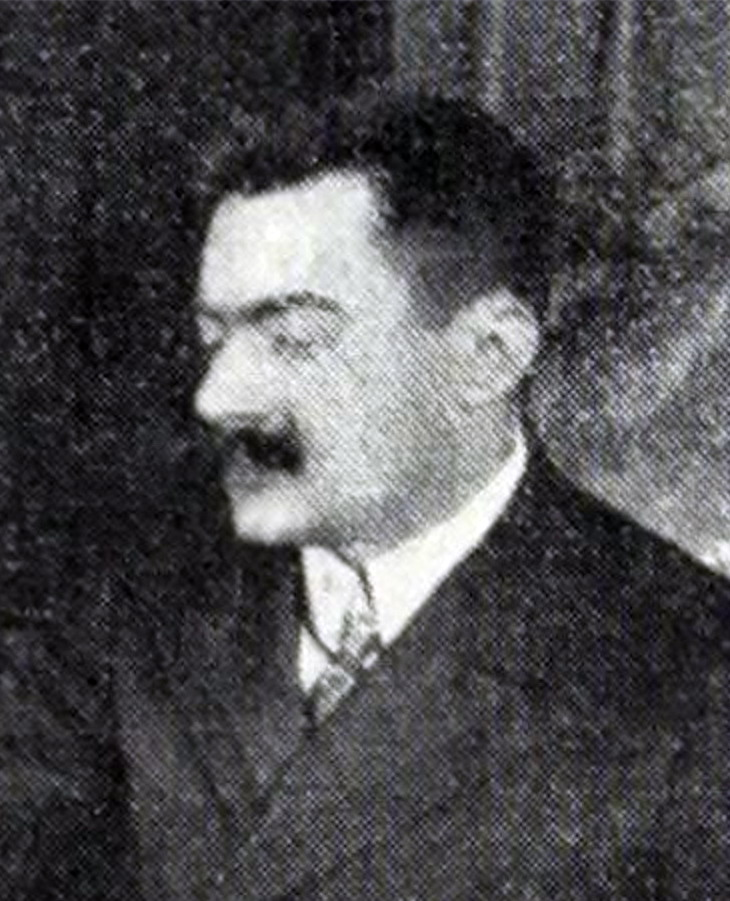
- Mihail G. Cantacuzino in 1906

Romanian Minister of Justice
- In office December 1910-January 1914; December 1916-January 1918
- Prime Minister: Ion I. C. Brătianu

Romanian Chamber of Deputies for Ialomita County
- In office 1909-?

Mayor of Bucharest
- In office 1904–1907

Personal details
- Born: 6 April 1867
- Died: 28 August 1928 (aged 61)
- Party: Romanian National (after 1922); Conservative (before 1922)
- Spouse: Maria Tescanu Rosetti (m. 1898)
- Children: Constantin Cantacuzino Alice Cantacuzino
- Parent: Gheorghe Cantacuzino (father)
- Relatives: Cantacuzino family Grigore Cantacuzino (brother); Alexandrina Cantacuzino (sister-in-law)
- Education: University of Paris

Prince Mihail G. Cantacuzino (6 April 1867 – 28 August 1928) was a Romanian politician.

== Biography ==
After receiving doctorates in Law and Literature from the University of Paris, he became a prominent member of the Conservative Party. He served as Mayor of Bucharest from 1904 to 1907 and was elected to the Chamber of Deputies for Ialomița County in 1909. He was Justice Minister from December 1910 to January 1914 and again from December 1916 to January 1918 in the national unity government of Ion I. C. Brătianu. In 1922, together with other members of the late Take Ionescu's Conservative-Democratic Party, he joined the Romanian National Party, becoming its vice president for the former Old Kingdom.

The eldest son of Gheorghe Grigore Cantacuzino and brother of Grigore Gheorghe Cantacuzino, he married Maria ("Maruca") Rosetti-Tescanu on November 26, 1898, with whom he had a son, the aviator Constantin Cantacuzino. He was a notorious womanizer and the marriage was an unhappy one, but it did allow the vain Maruca to use the title of "Princess Cantacuzino", which she retained until her death in 1968.
