= Alexandrina Cantacuzino =

Romanian political activist, philanthropist and diplomat (1876–1944)

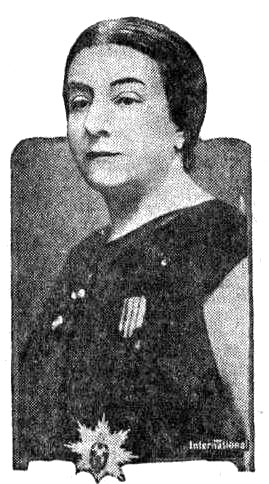
- Cantacuzino, photographed ca. 1925

Vice President of the International Council of Women
- In office 1925–1936

Delegate of the Kingdom of Romania to the League of Nations
- In office 1929–1938

Personal details
- Born: Alexandrina Pallady; 20 September 1876 Ciocănești, Ilfov County, Kingdom of Romania (present-day Dâmbovița County, Romania)
- Died: 1944 (aged 67 or 68)
- Party: Iron Guard
- Spouse: Grigore Gheorghe Cantacuzino (widowed 1930)
- Children: Gheorghe Cantacuzino (died 1977); Alexandru "Alecu" Cantacuzino (died 1939)
- Distinctions: Meritul Cultural; Order of Queen Marie; Order of the Holy Sepulchre; Order of St. Sava; Croix de guerre Croce al Merito di Guerra
- Nickname: Didina Cantacuzino

Alexandrina "Didina" Cantacuzino (née Pallady; also known as Alexandrina Grigore Cantacuzino and (Francized) Alexandrine Cantacuzène; 20 September 1876 – 1944) was a Romanian political activist, philanthropist and diplomat, one of her country's leading feminists in the 1920s and 1930s. A leader of the National Council of Romanian Women and the Association of Romanian Women, she served as Vice President of the International Council of Women, representing the International Alliance of Women, as well as Romania, to the League of Nations. However, her feminist beliefs and international profile clashed with her national conservatism, her support for eugenics, and eventually her conversion to fascism.

Cantacuzino was a member of Romanian nobility, and, after her marriage to the wealthy landowner Grigore Gheorghe Cantacuzino, claimed the title of "Princess". Her elitism and her feminism led her to join the upper-class charity SONFR, of which she became president after World War I. A wartime nurse, she became a herald of war remembrance initiatives (responsible, in large part, for the Mausoleum of Mărășești).

After her involvement with the National Council of Romanian Women, she supported limited women's suffrage within a corporatist framework, losing the support of liberal women, but also building connections with fascist politicians. Cantacuzino's policies within the Association of Romanian Women were mirrored in the legislation of World War II fascist regimes, beginning with the National Renaissance Front.

Sympathetic toward the revolutionary fascist Iron Guard, of which her son Alecu was also an affiliate, Cantacuzino switched her support toward Ion Antonescu's government in early 1941. Having earlier reported to the League of Nations on the damages caused by the Spanish Civil War, she was also critical of Antonescu over the 1941 Odessa massacre. This was her last known public cause. Cantacuzino died, in relative obscurity, not long after Antonescu's downfall.

== Biography ==
=== Early life ===
Alexandrina Pallady, also known under the pet name Didina, was born in Ciocănești, a village currently in Dâmbovița County (but, in 1876, still part of Ilfov County). Her birth date is known to have been 20 September 1876, but other sources mistakenly credit it as 1877 or 1881.

She was by birth a member of the boyar upper-class: her father, Lieutenant Colonel Theodor Pallady (1847/1853–1916), an aristocrat from the eastern region (and former state) of Moldavia, had earned distinction in the Romanian Land Forces; her mother, also named Alexandrina (1845/1848 – 1881), was a Kretzulescu boyaress from Wallachia, and the heiress of a large estate. Through Pallady's mother, Alexandrina descended from another boyar house, the Ghicas, who owned the manor in Ciocănești.

The marriage produced four children in all, but Alexandrina was the only one to survive infancy. From an affair with a Maria Stamatiade, Theodor Pallady had a son, the future Symbolist poet-publicist Alexandru Teodor "Al. T." Stamatiad (born 1885). Alexandrina's paternal family also produced other intellectual figures of importance: Theodor Iancu Pallady, the modernist painter, and Lucia Sturdza-Bulandra, the actress, were nephews of Lt. Col. Pallady, and as such cousins of Alexandrina and Al. T. Stamatiad.

Upon her mother's death in 1881, the five-year-old Alexandrina was raised by her aunt, Eliza Ghica, and formally adopted by Eliza's husband, Vladimir M. Ghica. With Ghica money, she was able to pursue studies abroad, in France. In or around 1899, after Eliza Ghica's death, Alexandrina Pallady-Ghica was living in the Romanian capital, Bucharest, where she married the aspiring politician Grigore Gheorghe Cantacuzino — known locally as Griguță Cantacuzino or, mockingly, as Prensul ("Princeling"). Her full name subsequently became Alexandrina Grigore Cantacuzino (sometimes shortened as Alexandrina Gr. Cantacuzino), with the inclusion of her husband's name as a patronymic.

The marriage propelled Cantacuzino into the high society, also bringing her into contact with the Conservative Party elite. The Cantacuzino family, of Phanariote origins, had been highly influential in the political affairs of Moldavia and Wallachia. Her father-in-law was the magistrate, Conservative policymaker and former premier Gheorghe Grigore Cantacuzino (1833–1913). He was also one of the greatest estate-owners in the Kingdom of Romania, known to the general public as Nababul ("the Nawab"). Her brother-in-law was Mihail G. "Mișu" Cantacuzino (1867–1928), who was the minister of justice and the leader of an inner-Conservative faction.

The Cantacuzinos stated claim to a princely title, which, although rendered useless under Romanian law, allowed Alexandrina to style herself "Princess Cantacuzino".

According to historian Marian Pruteanu, Alexandrina was "an avid collector of decorations and titles", who studied genealogy with the goal of establishing her blood relations with various noble families. Signs of her family wealth included one of Bucharest's first privately owned automobiles.

=== SONFR beginnings ===
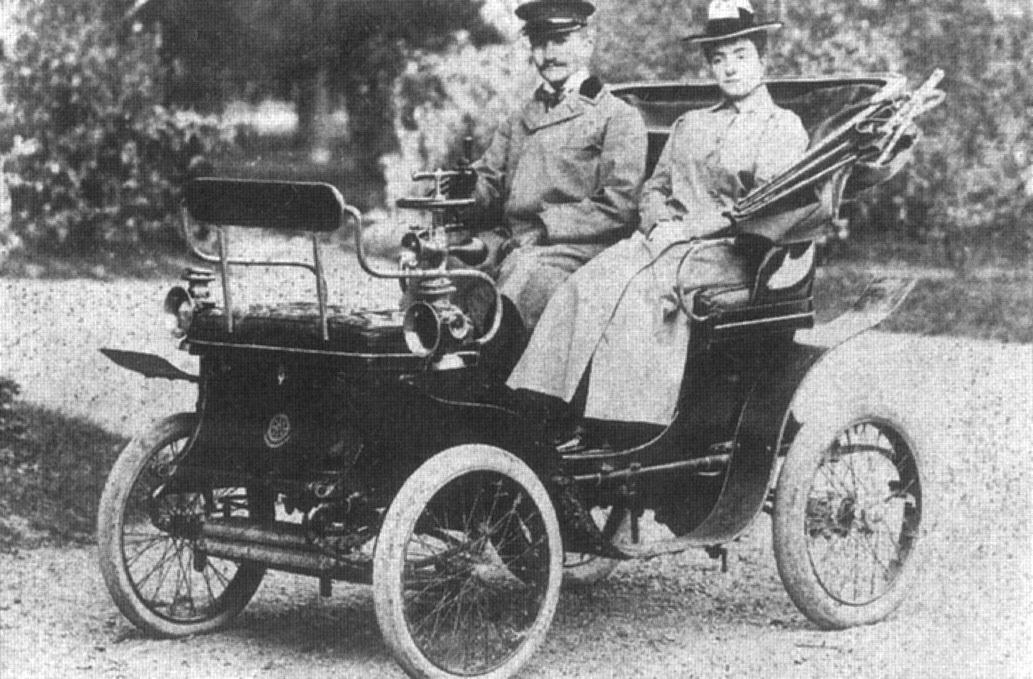
Alexandrina and husband Grigore Gheorghe Cantacuzino in the family car, August 1900

Alexandrina and Grigore had three sons, all of them born between 1900 and 1905, before both parents resumed their public careers. In 1910, Alexandrina joined a Romanian Orthodox philanthropic society, the National Orthodox Society of Romanian Women (Societatea Ortodoxă Națională a Femeilor Române, SONFR). While she is most often credited as a founding member, the society might have existed under a different name as early as 1893, with Ecaterina Cantacuzino, Gheorghe's wife, as its president.

The central core of SONFR was a group of high-society ladies, including Alexandrina Cantacuzino and, among others, Zoe Râmniceanu, Elena Odobescu, Anastasia Filipescu, Maria Glagoveanu, Sultana Miclescu and Zetta Manu. As indicated by the name, SONFR was situated on the conservative right of Romanian feminism, where it "reinforced women's traditional roles as mothers and wives", being entirely apolitical. However, the society was soon involved in a number of adjacent projects, such as disseminating propaganda among the Romanians of Transylvania, Bukovina, and other parts of Austria-Hungary, and circulating letters of protest against Magyarization.

Although SONFR was sponsored by "the Nawab" and other mainline Conservatives, such ideological positions resonated with the National Liberal program of Spiru Haret, the education minister, who offered his full support. With such sources of revenue, supplemented by bank loans and private donations, SONFR established two girls' schools, 17 kindergartens (the first of which was in Dorobanți), and 22 public libraries. Some of its funds went directly into purchasing land for Romanian peasant communities in Transylvania and elsewhere, with schools being built as far afield as Chernowitz, Geaca, and Markovac.

SONFR's more formal mission was to combat "foreign religious propaganda" and "the foreign educational establishments", which it described as sources of corruption for young Romanian women. According to historian Alin Ciupală, these goals should be seen as reflecting the "borderline intolerant" position of Romanian Orthodoxy, but not particularly conclusive at that: "We believe that SONFR's would-be alliance with the Church determined the adoption by the Ladies' Society leadership of ideas circulated by some Orthodox hierarchs, especially those concerning Catholicism, but mostly with a tactical goal in mind. [...] Moreover, one might mention here the organizers' intent to make use, as it did, of the Church-controlled, nation-wide, infrastructure: the priests as instruments for propaganda and the influence, not just moral, of the leading Orthodox hierarchs."

SONFR members included liberal suffragettes, such as Calypso Botez; Cantacuzino herself was less clearly affiliated with this current, although she did describe herself a "feminist". As noted by gender historian Roxana Cheșchebec, Cantacuzino was primarily an elitist, who believed in fulfilling a "historic mission of the upper classes", focusing on assisting "the socially disadvantaged as a way of serving the country and the nation." The same is noted by Pruteanu, who also records her claim that Romanian nobility lived "outside the murderous luxury that surrounds us." Pruteanu believes that Cantacuzino was "confused", with "a fractured identity", forever oscillating between "conformism and rebellion."

Meanwhile, in 1913, Grigore was appointed Mayor of Bucharest in the wake of the "Tramcar Affair", which had besmirched the opposition National Liberal Party. According to contemporary sources, he owed his appointment exclusively to "the Nawab", who was at the time performing his last official function, that of Senate President. The immensely large Cantacuzino estate was split between the two sons, both of whom used the Zamora Castle of Bușteni. It was to serve as a frequent retreat for the Romanian royal family. In 1915, Alexandrina also inherited the properties of her adoptive father, including Ciocănești.

=== World War I nurse ===
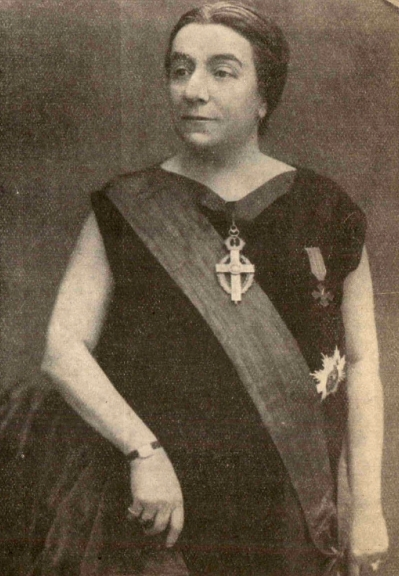
Cantacuzino in or around 1936

The start of World War I placed Romania in a delicate situation. From 1914 to the summer of 1916, the National Liberal cabinet of Ion I. C. Brătianu preserved the country's neutrality (see Romania during World War I). Public opinion became sharply divided among supporters of the Entente Powers and the "Germanophiles"—who favored the Central Powers, particularly Germany. Grigore Cantacuzino oscillated between the two sides, but his two newspapers, Minerva and Seara, were closely associated with Germanophilia. In September 1914, they were bought from him by a German consortium, and became the mouthpieces of German propaganda.

Following the 1916 Treaty with the Entente, King Ferdinand I and Premier Brătianu agreed to join the war against the Central Powers. This had the effect of silencing Germanophile dissidence. Alexandrina volunteered for work as a nurse. In August 1916, she became manager of the No. 113 Hospital, set up at the SONFR Institute in Bucharest with funds from the National Bank of Romania (her assistant managers were Elena Odobescu and Elena Perticari). By the end of the year, however, the Romanian Army was on the retreat everywhere, with the Germans in sight of Bucharest. King and government followed the Army retreat into Moldavia, where they remained besieged until 1918. The invasion further divided the Cantacuzino family, between those who aligned themselves with the German regime in Bucharest, and those who, as loyalists, fought against the Germans in Moldavia. The Zamora Castle was requisitioned by the Imperial German Army, serving as residence for the governor, August von Mackensen.

Grigore was an associate of the Germanophile administration set up by Lupu Kostaki in Bucharest, but moreover a confidant of the skeptical Conservative Alexandru Marghiloman. Together with Marghiloman and others, he stood up to the Germans when it came to providing for civilian needs, such as when he procured firewood for the Bucharest populace. Reportedly, he also took a mediating position between Marghiloman, who remained respectful of King Ferdinand, and Petre P. Carp, who wanted the dynasty ousted and replaced.

With Marghiloman as President of the Romanian Red Cross, Alexandrina became a member of the Red Cross "Ladies' Committee", working to provide humanitarian assistance for the prisoners-of-war in Romania and abroad. Her political attitudes at the time remain a mystery, with the exception of her belief that "a new world shall rise from the bloodied humanity"—not as an endorsement of political revolution, but as a trust in the ethnic Romanian capacity for work and rejuvenation.

On several occasions, Cantacuzino stood up to the German authorities and protected SONFR's interests, usually with significant success. SONFR was involved in smuggling recovering Romanian soldiers back into the Moldavian free zone. The hospital she managed was eventually evicted by the Germans, and Alexandrina published a letter a protest; she and her husband also spoke up in favor of Conon, the Metropolitan Bishop, who was being pressured into handing in the church administration to Mariu Theodorian-Carada, a Catholic. Such shows of dissent almost led to Alexandrina's own imprisonment in a German camp.

=== Marghiloman government ===
Alexandrina returned to work at the hospital. She decided to hold a banquet there in honor of Alexandru D. Sturdza and other defectors from the loyalist Romanian Army. The affair ended in a brawl between the party guests and the inmates-patients they ran into. In late 1917, with the fall of its Russian Republican backers, the Brătianu administration collapsed in Moldavia, leaving Ferdinand to ponder an armistice with the Germans. In Bucharest, the Marghiloman Conservatives created their own Legislative Commission, with the aim of achieving peace and reconciliation; Grigore Cantacuzino was among its members, but failed to win appointment in the subsequent Marghiloman Cabinet.

The year 1918 ended in unexpected defeat for the Germanophiles: the November Armistice signaled a sudden victory for the Entente Powers, and instantly brought the fall of Marghiloman's administration. Alexandrina Cantacuzino, who witnessed the events, mediated between the disgraced Marghiloman and General Alexandru Averescu, the King's favorite minister, circulating rumors that Romania was prey to revolutionary socialism. Organizing the welcome-back celebrations for Queen Marie, she also urged Marghiloman to stay indoors, because the Entente's military mission and the general populace wished to avoid him. As a tribute to her patriotic actions, Cantacuzino was elected SONFR president in 1918; she would lead the society until 1938.

Sabina Cantacuzino, Brătianu's sister and an in-law of Alexandrina's, observed her recovery from the side. In her memoirs, published in 1937, she accuses Alexandrina of staging "an advertisement". In her view, the SONFR leader making "a public show" of her compassion toward Romanian soldiers, while secure in the knowledge that Grigore Cantacuzino was in favor with the Germans. Such claims are also found in the diaries of Pia Alimănișteanu (Brătianu's daughter and Sabina's niece), who additionally writes that "Didina" enjoyed "hunting with the hounds and running with the hare". These views were met with opprobrium upon publishing: Sabina's work was dismissed as a libelous sample of Brătianu's "monopoly on patriotism".

The Conservative Party was in disarray, losing its members in droves. Marghiloman held on to the unpopular "Conservative" title (later "Conservative-Progressive"), while Grigore Cantacuzino advised in favor of reforming it as a "Constitutional Party", or merging it into Averescu's more successful People's Party. The brothers' "Cantacuzino Conservative" group became a virtually independent faction, sometimes in rebellion against Marghiloman's orders, and sympathetic to the breakaway Conservative-Democratic Party. However, both Grigore and Marghiloman were horrified by the promise of land reform, and, contrary to the moderate Conservatives, wanted the party to represent, as before 1914, the interests of landowners.

=== CNFR creation and SONFR presidency ===
After the creation of Greater Romania, SONFR negotiated its collaboration with the secular wing of the women's movement. Cantacuzino herself became a member of the nationwide Association for the Civil and Political Emancipation of Romanian Women (AECPFR), and unsuccessfully tried to absorb the smaller League for Women's Rights and Duties (LDDF) into SONFR. In June 1919, she was also elected honorary president of the female section within the "Cross Brotherhood", founded by right-wing nationalist Amos Frâncu at Cluj. In 1921, aiming to create an all-Romanian feminist representative body, she was made Vice President of the newly formed National Council of Romanian Women, CNFR; the president was Calypso Botez, of SONFR fame. Around 1923, she was one of the conservative proponents of women's suffrage, criticizing the postwar constitution for failing to enact it.

During those years, Cantacuzino worked as a permanent lecturer for Casele Naționale association. She took up similar activities at SONFR, where she lectured about the Orthodox and nationalist ethos, attracting into society ranks many female members of the middle classes, as well as new arrivals from the province of Bessarabia: Elena Alistar and Iulia Siminel-Dicescu.

It was Cantacuzino's stated goal that the "new world" of the interwar period signified the end of "doll-like women", of "women as eternal children", of "women as objects of pleasure"; a woman's new "gospel" was to be written among "morality in public life". While advocating the emergence of a "mother-citizen" generation, she deplored the rapid urbanization of the age, claiming that village children were abandoning "the great reservoir of family life" so as to "quickly become Mr. and Mrs. this-and-that". In contrast with the AECPFR, Cantacuzino and the CNFR represented a "national reformist" side of the feminist current. As Cheșchebec notes, such women intellectuals "aimed to appease fears of the destructive potential of feminist 'individualism', offering the 'acceptable' and 'nationally authentic' face of Romanian feminism." Their publicity efforts were fruitless, since: "despite ideological differences, all feminists aimed to alter the traditional family order. This common feature blurred the differences between various strands of feminism."

For Cantacuzino, Romanian Orthodoxy was "the blessed shield of the Romanian nation", with priests and women holding complementary positions as defenders of traditional life. At SONFR, where she still invested most of her efforts, she tackled generic Orthodox causes, such as taking sides with Meletius IV, the Ecumenical Patriarch, in his conflict with Kemalist Turkey. She was also strongly opposed to a Concordat between Romania and the Holy See, calling the Catholic Church an entity "entirely adverse" to the Romanian "unitary state", while referring to Byzantine Rite Catholics as Orthodoxy's "brothers". Under her management, SONFR heralded a number of initiatives, including the creation of schools, hospitals, and workers' canteens.

Following its involvement in the work to recover and honor the remains of soldiers killed in battle, SONFR found itself locked in a bitter rivalry with the Cultul Eroilor ("Heroes' Cult") organization, although Cantacuzino served on the leadership boards of both organizations. According to historian Maria Bucur, Cantacuzino embarked on "a two-decade struggle to become the custodian of the public remembrance of the war." The way Cantacuzino saw it, the reburial of bones was an essentially female-and-Orthodox task, since women were traditionally experts in parastas services. On such grounds, SONFR secured a virtual monopoly over the projects to honor those fallen in the Battle of Mărășești, their identification, and their annual commemoration.

=== GFR and rise to prominence ===
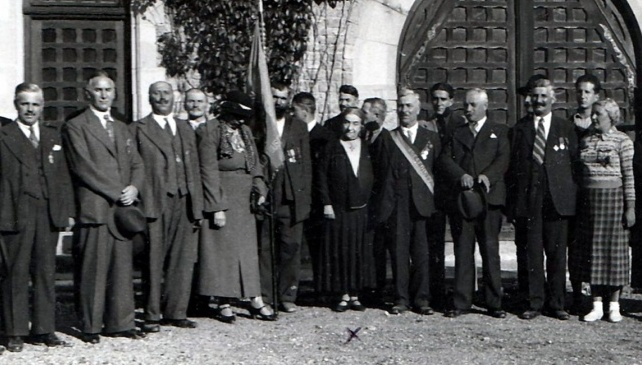
Alexandrina Cantacuzino (center, marked X), receiving visitors at the Zamora (Cantacuzino) Castle in Bușteni, ca. 1928

Although a nationalist at home, Cantacuzino was soon involved in the international women's movement, often as a Romanian representative. It was part of her power-sharing deal with Botez that she should deal with the external affairs of CNFR. In 1923, she was the LDDF's delegate to the Congress International Alliance of Women (IAWSA, IAWSEC) Congress in Rome. While abroad, she created a female version of the Little Entente, of which she was president until 1924. Dubbed "Little Entente of Women" (Mica Antantă a Femeilor, MAF), or "Women of the Small Nations", it aligned Romanian feminist organizations with like-minded sororities from Czechoslovakia, Poland, Greece and the Kingdom of Yugoslavia. She was generally hostile to the ethnic minorities, but also interested in finding common ground with feminists from the Transylvanian Saxon and Hungarian communities, inviting them to the women's congress of 1925.

From 1925 to 1936, with a CNFR mandate, Cantacuzino served as Vice President of the International Council of Women (ICW), and, as such became Romania's best-known feminist. She was one of the European delegates to ICW's 1925 Conference in Washington, D. C. By 1926, her distinctions included the Grand Cross of Queen Marie, the Order of the Holy Sepulchre (Collar), the Order of St. Sava (Great Officer), the Croix de guerre (Officer) and the Croce al Merito di Guerra (Officer). She was IWC delegate at the League of Nations in 1927, and again in 1933, as well as IAWSEC rapporteur to the same international body (1926, 1928, 1933). Drifting apart from both the LDDF and AECPFR, who accused her of using feminism to advance her own "internationalist" goals, Cantacuzino presided upon Solidaritatea ("Solidarity"), her very own feminist sorority, enlisting it with IAWSEC as a separate body.

Under the provisions of a law which allowed some women to run in local elections, Cantacuzino served on the Bucharest Financial Commission in 1927, and was a City Councilor after 1928, helping to establish the CNFR-run vocational school for female "social auxiliaries". She was dividing her time between Bucharest and Zamora Castle, where, in August 1928, her eldest son Gheorghe Grigore married Zoe Greceanu.

Cantacuzino immersed herself in the struggle for electoral emancipation, lobbying for women's right to vote and run in elections for urban and rural citizens' councils. To this goal, she created in 1929 an Association of Romanian Women (Gruparea Femeilor Române, GFR), of which she became president, while preserving control over CNFR and the smaller Solidaritatea. One of the GFR's main goals, cemented in its charter, was "an active propaganda work, oral as well as written, among the feminine masses"; another one was the setting up of Initiative Committees for female representation. However, the GFR remained highly centralized, and no clear criterion for admitting or rejecting membership was ever recorded in its statutes. Political scientist Alexandra Petrescu finds that the GFR, a "matriarchal" order, mimicked the "masculine hierarchy" of traditional political parties, effectively subverting the democratizing process of first-wave feminism.

Cantacuzino participated in the grand rally of 150 women's societies, held at Fundațiile Regale, Bucharest, on 28 April of that year. This resulted in a minor victory: a new law was passed in August 1929, allowing most professional women and all war widows to vote and participate in council elections. Her notoriety was reflected in other areas. She was the first-ever woman Officer of the Meritul Cultural Order. In 1928, she was a Miss Romania judge, together with, among others, Nicolae Constantin Batzaria, Maria Giurgea and Liviu Rebreanu. She also served as head of the Female Section during the June 1929 International Agricultural Congress.

Cantacuzino was co-opted among the official Romanian representatives to the League of Nations (uninterruptedly, from 1929 to 1938), primarily as adviser on women and child protection. Meanwhile, together with art historian Alexandru Tzigara-Samurcaș, she set up a Union of Intellectuals at a formal gala in 1926. This circle was a local affiliate of Europe's Federation of Intellectual Unions, whose founders included Hugo von Hofmannsthal, Paul Valéry and Nicolae Titulescu, and whose stated mission was finding a solution to "the vital crisis of the continent". One of its members was journalist Constantin Beldie, who left sarcastic notes about the Union's cultural conservatism. Received and celebrated in Prague by Methodius Zavoral, Abbot of Strahov Monastery (1928), Cantacuzino was also a delegate to the Federation of Intellectual Unions Congress in Barcelona (October 1929).

=== Fascist transformation ===
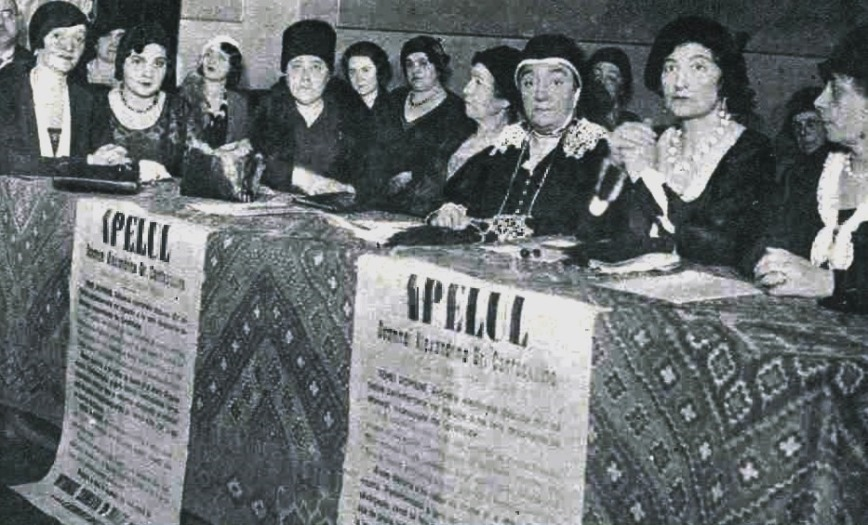
Cantacuzino (front row, third from right) and other SONFR delegates at a Bucharest rally for women's suffrage, March 1932

Beginning with the deaths of King Ferdinand and Brătianu, Romania went through a political power shift: in 1930, the junior king, Michael I, was toppled by his own father, the disgraced Carol II. In the realm of feminism, Cantacuzino rose to the position of CNFR President. This followed the protest resignation of Calypso Botez, part of an anti-Cantacuzino schism inside the CNFR. Also in 1930, Grigore Gheorghe Cantacuzino died, leaving Alexandrina a widow. She never remarried.

Over several years, Alexandrina Cantacuzino's nationalism mutated into authoritarianism. By then, the apparent successes of Italian fascism, which probably impressed Cantacuzino during her visit to Rome, had widened the fault line in the Romanian feminist movement. Cantacuzino was won over by the fascist critique of liberal democracy, and, while still a feminist, began voicing support for an alternative to Romania's own liberal regime. Cantacuzino envisaged a corporatist monarchy, campaigned for a technocratic public administration service, and favored disfranchising the poorly educated males (while enfranchising educated women).

As argued by Alexandra Petrescu, the GFR's ideology mutated into the "Latin" feminism promoted, on occasion, by Benito Mussolini himself, with its vision of Latin women as equal combatants in a corporatist revolution. This switch in allegiance was occurring just as the Little Entente of Women began fading into insignificance. Cantacuzino was vehemently opposed to the other delegates, including Greece's Avra Theodoropoulou, over the issue of admitting women from Bulgaria, Republican Turkey and Albania.

The GFR, unlike all other feminist groups, banned women from enlisting in party politics, but encouraged them to run in municipal elections as they pleased. According to Petrescu, this demand should be contrasted with the GFR's structure and goals, which, she argues, are those of an informal political party. Cantacuzino voiced her ideas in the GFR and CNFR petitions of December 1930 and March 1932, while also asking that representatives of women's organizations be assigned seats in the Senate. In 1933, she spoke in front of GFR members about the corporatist "reconstruction" of Romania, drafting out her own project for senatorial "corporatist elections" by men- and women-electors. The immediate effect of such interventions was the creation of a GFR youth wing, Tinerele Grupiste, likely modeled on Italy's Gruppo Universitario Fascista (but, unlike it, focused only on campaigns for female employment).

Researchers are divided when it comes to evaluating the actual appeal of Cantacuzino's nationalist feminism. Bucur writes that "most feminists, like Alexandrina Cantacuzino, were also aggressive, even jingoistic nationalists". Contrarily, Petrescu notes: "Alexandrina Cantacuzino is the interwar's only feminist to have let herself be seduced by authoritarianism." The AECPFR and other organizations repudiated Cantacuzino, declaring themselves for emancipation within the format of liberal democracy. Occasionally, Cantacuzino herself still showed interest in the development of democratic societies: a guest of the Friends of America society on Washington's Birthday, 1932, she lectured about "Different Aspects of American Life and Culture". Although no longer serving as ICW Vice President in 1936, she was made Convener of its Fine and Applied Arts Committee, as well as delegate to the Joint Conference of the International Council of Women and the International Council of Women in Calcutta, British India. In January 1934, Dimitrie Gusti's Romanian Social Institute elected her on its steering committee.

At home, her eclectic feminist program included a project for making paramilitary services fully staffed by women, with the goal of achieving the total conscription of men. Xenophobia tinged Cantacuzino's writings from an early stage: in the early 1920s, she opined that "foreign-ism" was one of the factors working against female emancipation, having "dragged the tender soul that is womanhood out of her home and to purposeless partying." However, her stated internationalism was rejected by even more radical SONFR nationalists. This anti-Masonic wing of SONFR resigned in 1934, after Cantacuzino refused to testify, under oath, that she was not a covert Freemason.

By 1937, in tune with the National Christian Party regime, Cantacuzino had embraced eugenics, racism, and antisemitism. At a meeting in Cluj, she proposed the introduction of legislation banning all "foreigners" and minorities from marrying Romanian state employees, as well as 10-year reviews for all Romanian citizenship applications. Additionally, she and the GFR envisaged state bonuses for "eugenic" marriages between full-blooded Romanian youths. Meanwhile, her connections in the international feminist movement became alarmed by the growth of antisemitic violence. In a December 1933 letter to Cantacuzino, Cécile Brunschvicg inquired: "there is talk of terrible antisemitic campaigns in Romania, and of the development of a Nazi spirit in your country. Is this true? [...] It would really be a deplorable if [the Nazi] spirit were to win over a Latin country that is so sane, and so very close to our hearts."

=== Between Carol and the Iron Guard ===
The 1938 Constitution seemed to agree with most of Cantacuzino's authoritarian-and-corporatist ideals, including women's suffrage with overall disenfranchisement, and even female conscription. Transformed by King Carol's decrees into a corporatist chamber, and controlled by the National Renaissance Front, the Senate received its first female member, Maria M. Pop, in 1939. She was not a GFR appointee, but rather an old AECPFR combatant. For her part, Cantacuzino still held diplomatic assignments at the League of Nations, this time representing the Romanian government. She was tasked with improving the livelihoods of children and women affected by the Spanish Civil War, proposing the creation of neutral zones for children, and working on an internationally valid Children's Charter.

There were already signs that a rift was occurring between King Carol and the fascist feminists. In September 1938, Cantacuzino was a guest of honor at the Mausoleum of Mărășești inauguration, where she spoke about SONFR's contribution to the "eternal remembrance" of World War I heroes; she also called to memory the "Glorious Reign" of King Ferdinand as a "Symbol of the Fatherland" and "the Soul among Souls". According to Bucur, the speech can be read as a jibe at both Cultul Eroilor and King Carol, whose conduct in wartime had been less than honorable. At the GFR Congress in Brașov, Cantacuzino publicly complained that her goal of achieving women's suffrage had turned into a bitter victory.

It is unclear whether or not she supported the Iron Guard, a rival, largely underground, fascist movement. Other members of the Cantacuzino clan were enthusiastic supporters. A distant relative, General Gheorghe Cantacuzino-Grănicerul, had been an associate of the Guard's leader Corneliu Zelea Codreanu since 1933, and became the Guard's second-in-command from 1937. From 1935, Alexandrina's youngest son, Alexandru "Alecu" Cantacuzino, a former member of the diplomatic corps, was also attracted into this political venture. He wrote tracts disseminating the Iron Guard's ideology, focusing on praise of its "irrational and persistent impulse", but also relating to "Jewish Bolshevism", eugenics, race, and sexuality. In 1936, he was one of the Guard's volunteers in the Spanish Civil War, on the Nationalist side. This episode upset his mother, who reportedly called his actions "idiotic".

Alecu returned home in February 1937, and given a hero's reception at the Moța–Marin funeral. The Iron Guard accepted Alecu, but mistrusted Alexandrina, seeing her as a dangerous internationalist. In a 1937 letter (recovered and published in 2005), General Cantacuzino-Grănicerul threatens Alexandrina to stop intervening between him, Alecu, and Codreanu, accusing her of having "filled our Orthodox schools with kikes" and of "preach[ing] an entente with the enemies of the people."

Before the close of 1938, King Carol's police forces clamped down on the Iron Guard, and killed Codreanu in custody. Alexandrina was placed under surveillance, suspected of having helped the outlawed movement, while her GFR and Tinerele Grupiste were also outlawed. Alecu was detained at the concentration camp in Râmnicu Sărat, where, unbeknown to his family, he was shot dead by the guards (22 September 1939). Around October, rumors spread that Alexandrina and her other sons were also about to be interned; the authorities eventually decided to monitor Alexandrina by placing her under house arrest.

=== World War II and death ===
The final stage of Cantacuzino's career covers saw her collateral involvement in the political upheavals of World War II. During late 1940, Carol fell from power, and the Iron Guard established its "National Legionary State". At its helm was an army man and political maverick, Conducător Ion Antonescu, on whose behalf Alexandrina Cantacuzino had intervened in the past. As noted by Cheșchebec, Alecu's killing "apparently is not related to Cantacuzino's show of support for the legionary regime". Her decision to join the Iron Guard was motivated, according to Bucur, by "sheer opportunism or because [she] hoped to carve out a leading, powerful role in such a dynamic movement", and most likely not by fear of reprisals. Signs of this rapprochement are recorded in the Guard's newspapers: in 1940, Porunca Vremii published Lucrezzia Karnabatt's interview with Cantacuzino, where she described the political role of women in the National Legionary regime.

After the January 1941 battle between the Guard and Antonescu, which was won by the latter, Cantacuzino endured an Antonescu supporter. By June, Antonescu had agreed to participate in Operation Barbarossa: as an ally of the Nazi Germany, Romania recaptured the lost province of Bessarabia. In an article for the official propaganda paper, Universul, Cantacuzino celebrated "the holy hour" as the definitive end of "Jewish democracy", and envisaged a redemption of Europe under fascist rule. The Antonescu regime soon enforced racial antisemitism across the land. According to Alexandra Petrescu, the legislation introduced at the time was remarkably similar with the Cantacuzino project of 1937.

Cantacuzino was not an uncritical affiliate of Antonescu's policies, as she showed during her October 1941 visit Odessa, capital of newly occupied Transnistria. It took place just days after the Antonescu-ordered massacre of Odesan Jews, of which she was informed by the City Mayor, Gherman Pântea. Pântea believed the massacre to have been incidental, not deliberate. Using Cantacuzino as his messenger, asked Antonescu to punish the guilty parties and allow Jewish deportees back in Odessa. Pântea reports that Cantacuzino shared his belief that the massacre was going to weigh heavily on "the entire country", and that "an objective inquiry" was needed; he writes that Antonescu threatened to shoot him for disobedience, but that he changed his mind, and even that he lived to regret his order for massacre. Cantacuzino continued to intervene with Antonescu on other matters, such as when she obtained the naturalization of Pavel Chasovnikov, an Odesan surgeon.

Cantacuzino died in September, October, or November 1944. This was closely after King Michael's Coup, which had resulted in Antonescu's arrest and the denunciation of Romania's Nazi alliance. Historian Ion Constantin claims that she committed suicide, "to avoid the torment of detention under the Romanian communist regime". Roxana Cheșchebec, however, records her death cause as "old age". She was survived by Gheorghe Cantacuzino, who pursued a career in archeology, epigraphy, and papyrology; he died in 1977.

In the years following Alexandrina's death, Zamora Castle was nationalized, then assigned to the Interior Ministry; reclaimed by the Cantacuzinos after the Romanian Revolution of 1989, and finally reassigned to them in 2004, it was later sold to other private owners. The Ciocănești manor, confiscated from Gheorghe Cantacuzino, was classified as a historical monument and Writers' Union vacation home, but not before being thoroughly devastated by the local trade unions. It was also nationalized in 1949, but continued to be looted after that date.
