= Gheorghe Grigore Cantacuzino =

Romanian politician and lawyer (1832–1913)

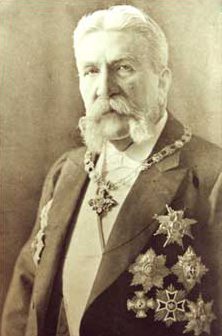

20th Prime Minister of Romania
- In office 11 April 1899 – 7 July 1900
- Monarch: Carol I
- Preceded by: Dimitrie Sturdza
- Succeeded by: Petre P. Carp
- In office 22 December 1904 – 12 March 1907
- Monarch: Carol I
- Preceded by: Dimitrie Sturdza
- Succeeded by: Dimitrie Sturdza

11th President of the Senate of Romania
- In office 25 February 1892 – 24 October 1895
- Monarch: Carol I
- Preceded by: Constantin Boerescu
- Succeeded by: Dimitrie Ghica
- In office 10 March 1911 – 23 March 1913
- Monarch: Carol I
- Preceded by: Constantin Budișteanu
- Succeeded by: Theodor Rosetti

19th President of the Chamber of Deputies
- In office 16 November 1889 – 22 February 1891
- Monarch: Carol I
- Preceded by: Constantin Grădișteanu
- Succeeded by: Gheorghe Rosnovanu
- In office 25 September 1900 – 14 February 1901
- Monarch: Carol I
- Preceded by: Constantin Olănescu
- Succeeded by: Mihail Pherekyde

Personal details
- Born: 22 September 1832 Bucharest, Wallachia
- Died: 23 March 1913 (aged 80) Bucharest, Kingdom of Romania
- Resting place: Bellu Cemetery, Bucharest
- Party: Conservative Party
- Children: Grigore and Mihail
- Relatives: Alexandrina Cantacuzino (daughter-in-law)

Gheorghe Grigore Cantacuzino (22 September 1832 – 23 March 1913), was a Romanian politician and lawyer, one of the leading Conservative Party policymakers. He was an aristocrat and member of the House of Cantacuzino.

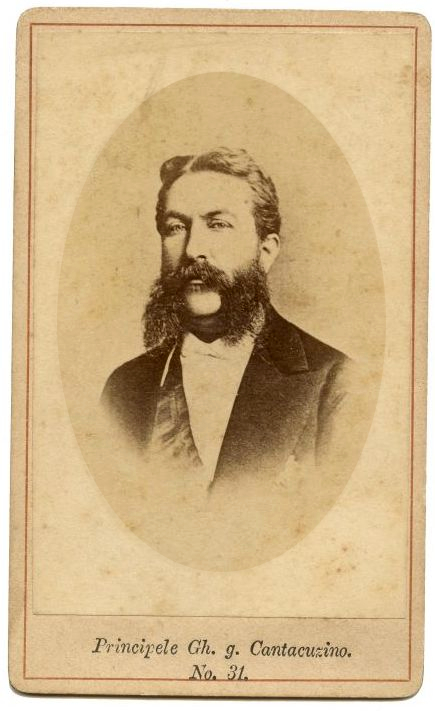

Among Cantacuzino's political posts were that of Minister of Public Instruction, president of the Chamber of Deputies, and President of the Senate. He twice served as the Prime Minister of Romania: between 23 April 1899 and 19 July 1900, and between 4 January 1906 and 24 March 1907. He resigned from office after failing to put down the large-scale peasants' revolt. He was the 20th Romanian politician to serve as Prime Minister.

The wealthy Cantacuzino was born into the aristocratic Cantacuzino family, of Phanariote origins. He built the Cantacuzino Palace of Bucharest and the Cantacuzino Castle of Bușteni. He was the father of Grigore Gheorghe Cantacuzino and Mihail G. Cantacuzino, as well as the father-in-law of Alexandrina Pallady-Cantacuzino.
