= Czech alexandrine =

Verse form found in Czech poetry

Czech alexandrine (in Czech: český alexandrín) is a verse form found in Czech poetry of the 20th century. It is a metre based on French alexandrine. The most important features of the pattern are number of syllables (twelve or thirteen) and a caesura after the sixth syllable. It is an unusual metre, exhibiting characteristics of both syllabic and syllabotonic (accentual-syllabic) metre. Thus it occupies a transitional position between syllabic and accentual patterns of European versification. It stands out from the background of modern Czech versification, which is modeled chiefly after German practice.

The Czech alexandrine is also metrically ambiguous because of its accentuation, which can reflect the rhythms of iambic hexameter, dactylic tetrameter, and combinations thereof. Compared with iambic hexameter and dactylic tetrameter, the Czech alexandrine preserves all constants between the two, and allows the rhythms of either to emerge:

iambic hexameter:    s S s S s S | s S s S s S (s)
dactylic tetrameter: S s s S s s | S s s S s s (s)
Czech alexandrine:   o o s S s o | o o s S s o (s)

S=stressed syllable; s=unstressed syllable; o=either.

The Czech alexandrine allows these two rhythms run parallel to each other; sometimes the first is stronger, other times the second.

In Czech the first syllable of every lexical word or prepositional phrase is always stressed, so rhythmical units are: s, S, Ss, Sss, Ssss. A great advantage of the Czech alexandrine is that it can be built of any words (or phrases). A half-line can be composed of 1-syllable words (stressed or unstressed), 2-syllable words, 3-syllable words, and 4-syllable words. Possible combinations in the first half-line (with | separating words) include: s|Ss|Ss|S, s|Ss|Sss, Sss|Ss|S, Sss|Sss — for the second half-line: s|Ss|Ss|S, s|Ss|Sss, Sss|Ss|S, Sss|Sss, s|Ss|Ss|Ss, Sss|SsSs, s|Ss|Ssss, Sss|Ssss. Czech poets usually use both masculine and feminine alexandrine lines, but sometimes they choose to apply only one kind.

The first poet to use the Czech alexandrine (in his 1836 poem "Máj") was Karel Hynek Mácha, considered the greatest Czech poet. Although the discussed meter was theoretically fully iambic, he inserted many trisyllabic words into his lines:

   S s s  S s s | S s  s   S s   S
V jezeru zeleném bílý je ptáků sbor,

s  S  s     S  s  S |s  S   s  S  s s s
a lehkých člůnků běh i rychlé veslování

The variation in rhythms can be heard in a formally equivalent paraphrase:

V jezeru zeleném bílý je ptáků sbor,
a lehkých člůnků běh i rychlé veslování

Translation:

Emerald, ivory: pelicans flock the lake
As oarsmen pilot sculls and cutters hurryingly.

"Hrál kdosi na hoboj" ("Somebody played oboe") by Karel Hlaváček is a short poem in Czech alexandrines:

Hrál kdosi na hoboj, a hrál již kolik dní,
hrál vždycky navečer touž píseň mollovou
a ani nerozžal si oheň pobřežní,
neb všecky ohně prý tu zhasnou, uplovou.

Hrál dlouze na hoboj, v tmách na pobřeží, v tmách,
na plochém pobřeží, kde nikdo nepřistál:
Hrál pro svou Lhostejnost, či hrál spíš pro svůj Strach?
Byl tichý Pastevec, či vyděděný Král?

Hrál smutně na hoboj. Vzduch zhluboka se chvěl
pod písní váhavou a jemnou, mollovou…
A od vod teskně zpět mu hoboj vlhkem zněl:
Jsou ohně marny, jsou, vždy zhasnou, uplovou.

Many poets used the Czech alexandrine in the 20th century, both in original works and in translations. Among them there were Vítězslav Nezval, Jiří Orten, Ivan Blatný, Vladimír Holan and Oldřich Vyhlídal.

The caesura formula is a good base for enjambment. Sometimes a sentence runs from caesura to next caesura, as in "The Seventh Elegy" by Jiří Orten:

Píši vám, Karino, a nevím, zda jste živa,
zda nejste nyní tam, kde se už netoužívá,
zda zatím neskonal váš nebezpečný věk.
Jste mrtva? Poproste tedy svůj náhrobek,
aby se nadlehčil. Poproste růže, paní,
aby se zavřely. Poproste rozpadání,
aby vám přečetlo list o mém rozpadu.

== See also ==
- Polish alexandrine
