= Blossom C. Brown =

American transgender rights advocate and public speaker

Blossom Chrishelle Brown (born 1986) is an American transgender rights advocate and public speaker. Brown gained national attention in 2019 for criticizing the lack of Black transgender representation during the CNN and HRC LGBTQ Equality Town Hall in Los Angeles, and is the subject of the documentary film One Life to Blossom.

== Life and career ==
Brown was raised in Mississippi and attended Mississippi University for Women, where she studied public health education. While pursuing a career in health care, Brown said she applied to nursing programs multiple times and believed repeated rejections reflected anti-transgender bias despite strong academic performance. Her story received wider attention after she appeared on the E! docuseries I Am Cait and subsequently on The Ellen DeGeneres Show, where Ellen DeGeneres and Caitlyn Jenner presented Brown with a US$20,000 scholarship to support her studies.

Brown's advocacy focuses on access to health care, HIV awareness, and safety and inclusion for Black transgender women. She has spoken at community events and in media interviews about barriers in education and health care for transgender people. On October 10, 2019, during the CNN/HRC LGBTQ Equality Town Hall in Los Angeles, Brown took a microphone during Beto O'Rourke's segment to highlight the absence of Black trans questioners and the ongoing violence against Black trans women. The moment drew national coverage and discussion about representation.

Brown is the central subject of One Life to Blossom, a feature documentary directed by Alexandrina André that follows her transition, activism, and pursuit of facial feminization surgery in the year surrounding the 2019 town hall appearance. The film screened at festivals and later became available on streaming platforms.
