= Cantacuzino Castle =

Castle in Bușteni, Romania

Cantacuzino castle
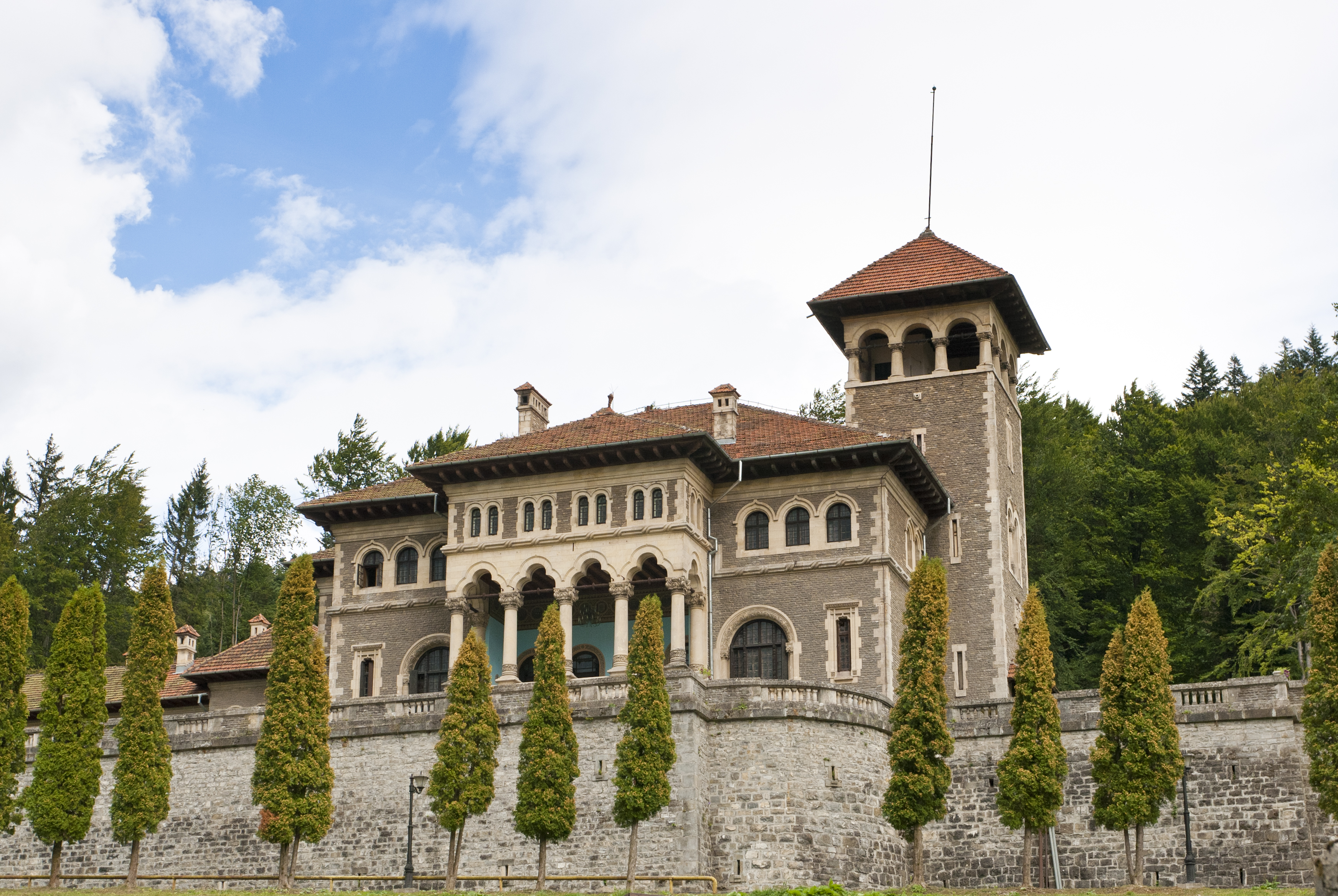
- Interactive map of the Cantacuzino castle area

General information
- Architectural style: Neo-Romanian
- Location: Bușteni, Romania
- Coordinates: 45°24′50.8″N 25°32′33.3″E
- Completed: 1911

Design and construction
- Architect: Grigore Cerchez (1850-1927)

Cantacuzino Castle is situated in Bușteni, Romania, in the Zamora district, on the street bearing the same name. The building has a great architectural, historical, documentary and artistic value.

== History ==
The building, whose construction was completed in 1911, was conducted by the architect Grigore Cerchez (1850-1927), a prominent figure of the Neo-Romanian style, at the request of Prince Gheorghe Grigore Cantacuzino, who was nicknamed "Nababul" (“The Nabob”).

The castle was placed on the site of an old hunting lodge that the prince's family had used as a halt during their pilgrimages to Brașov.

The construction works lasted for five years, and the furnishing lasted another year and a half. At the inauguration in 1911, the castle impressed not only by its style and beauty, but also by its modern facilities in relation to those times, benefitting from electricity, sewerage system and drinking water.

Until 1930, the castle served as the summer residence of the family of Prince Grigore Cantacuzino. The castle belonged to the Cantacuzino family until its nationalization in 1948, then became a sanatorium of the Ministry of Internal Affairs.

The castle underwent restoration work and today it is open to the public.

Cantacuzino Castle is sometimes nicknamed "Zamora" Castle due to its location. However, it is said that the name Zamora came from a hound that belonged to the members of the Cantacuzino family. They shouted "Za 'Mura!" to signal the hound to bring them the prey.

== Castle structure ==
The building was made of carved stone on the outside and brick on the inside, the foundation is made of concrete, and the roof is made of tile.

The construction is of the pavilion type, having the shape of a quadrilateral with the southern side open. The entire castle consists of 4 bodies. The central pavilion has a floor area of 1,200.30 m^{2} (12,919.9 sq ft) and 3,148.02 m^{2} (33,885.0 sq ft) in total (basement, ground floor and first floor). The service pavilion has ground floor and first floor, covering an area of 403.80 m^{2} (4,346.5 sq ft). The administrative villa has one single level, of 114.41 m^{2} (1,231.5 sq ft). The fourth building is the chapel.

== Interior of the castle ==
The inside the castle has a pronounced romantic character, offered by the numerous details and ornaments, such as:

- Roman mosaic, on the first level;
- Mural paintings made by Venetian artists;
- Murano glass stained glass;
- Italian glazed pottery, in the main hall;
- Fireplaces made of Albești limestone, decorated with polychrome mosaic and gold leaf;
- Oak wood ceilings, coffered and carved;
- Carved oak doors;
- Oak staircase designed to rest only on the walls, without other central support;
- Carrara marble stairs;
- Railings carved in stone, wrought iron or wood;
- Bronze hardware with ornaments, made in Paris;
- Painted boxes and decorative friezes.

In addition to the ornamental motifs present inside the building, the central pavilion hosts a gallery of mural paintings made on Cordoba leather that is unique in Romania. The gallery depicts twelve life-size portraits of the main members of the Cantacuzino family in the Wallachian branch.

Also in the central pavilion, in the ballroom, there is a collection of heraldry, representing 27 coats of arms belonging to the aristocracy members who were related to the Cantacuzino family.

== Exterior of the castle ==
Outside the castle, above the main entrance from the park, is the emblem of the Cantacuzino family, carved in stone. The main entrance from the park also has a large terrace made of stone, which has views of the Bucegi Mountains, along with the Heroes' Cross on Caraiman Peak.

On the same side of the castle, on the first floor, is located the lodge of the Cantacuzino Castle, built in Brancoveanu style, bearing stone columns with capitals and trilobate arches. In this lodge, in 1928, Queen Maria of Romania, Princess Ileana and the first Patriarch of Romania, Miron Cristea, were photographed together with the groom and bride - George Cantacuzino, the grandson of “Nababu” and one of the great archaeologists of Romania, and Zoe Grecianu, daughter of some aristocrats of the time.

In 1923, as a tribute to Prince Grigore Cantacuzino, above the entrance to the inner courtyard of the castle, the following text was carved in stone: “I, Gheorghe Grigore Cantacuzino, with my wife Ecaterina born Băleanu, built this castle in memory of my ancestors and for the shelter of the descendants.”

In the inner courtyard of the castle, on the east side, there is a hunting tower.

== Domain and church ==
The castle is surrounded by a courtyard that covers an area of 3.5 ha (8.6 acres). The garden at the base of the palace includes three fountains, two of which with artesian wells. The main alley of the park is bordered by aligned trees, respecting the style of parks in great European capitals. Another distinctive element of the garden is the anthropic cave.

In 1935-1936, a small wooden church was built on the castle domain, dedicated to Saint George the Conqueror. At her consecration, on September 13, 1936, Queen Maria of Romania and Princess Ileana were invited. The wooden church is located on the exact place of a former church brought from Maramureș region by the ancestors of Prince Grigore Cantacuzino, in the 18th century.

Apart from the courtyard that surrounds the castle, the Cantacuzino estate has another 970 ha (2,400 acres) of forest located on the Zamora mountain.

== Communist period ==
During the period when the building served as a sanatorium, the walls were painted evenly. After the restitution, a restoration process began in order to uncover the original paintings.

== Today ==
During the post-communist period, the castle was returned to the direct heiress, Ioana Cantacuzino, the "Nabob"'s great-granddaughter.

The castle is now privately owned and has been open to the public since 2010. Cantacuzino Castle has, since then, received tens of thousands of visitors annually, both from within the country and abroad. Tourists can visit the courtyard, which contains various sculptures. They also have access at the interior of the castle, through daily guided tours.

Since 2015, the upper floor of the castle hosts an art gallery, which periodically displays exhibitions with works by several artists.

In addition to its traditional elements, since 2016, the castle courtyard hosts an adventure park for children and parents, as well as two restaurants with a terrace, opened in 2012 and 2020, respectively.

In 2022, the castle was a filming location for the Netflix series Wednesday.

== Gallery ==
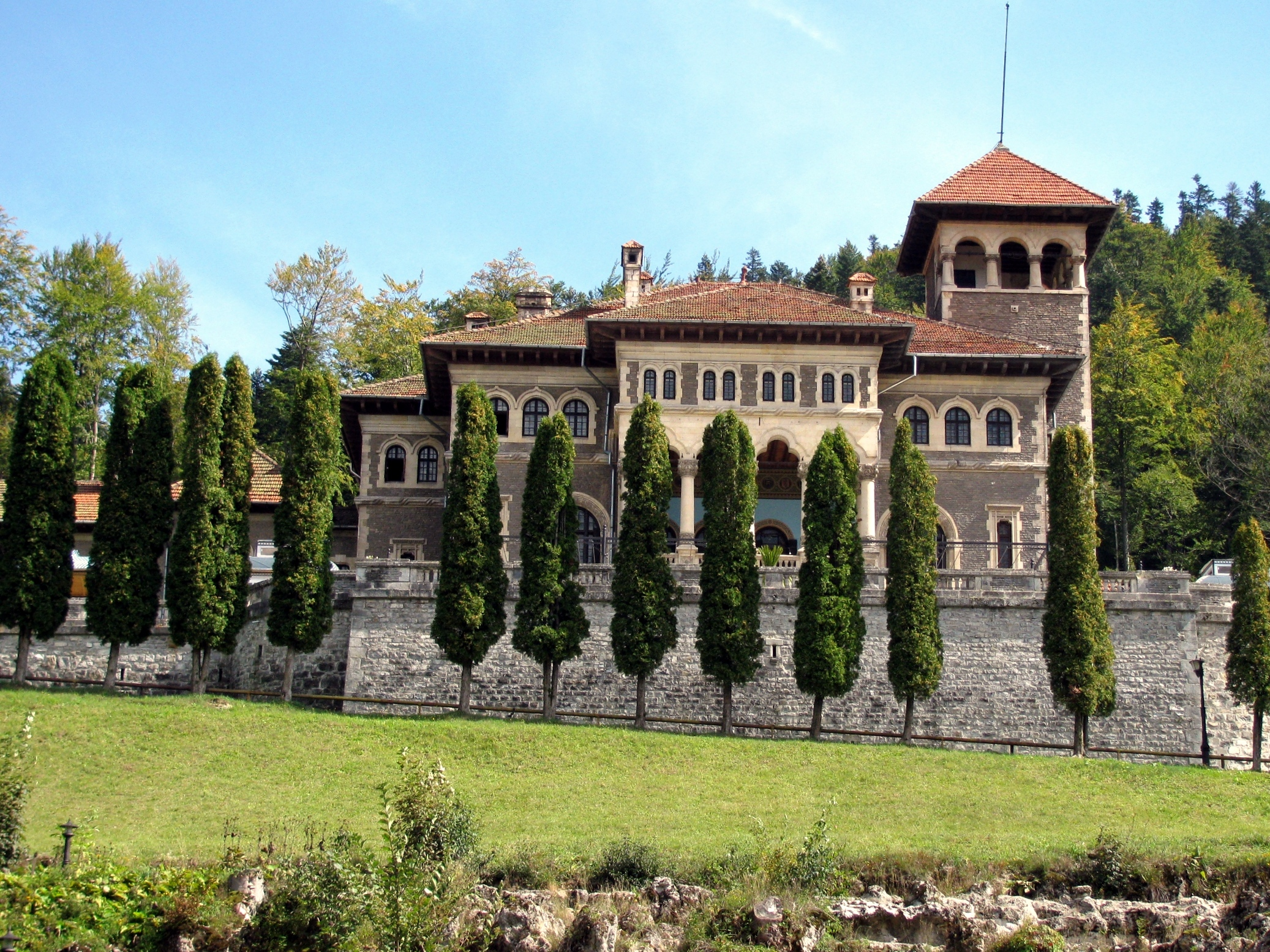

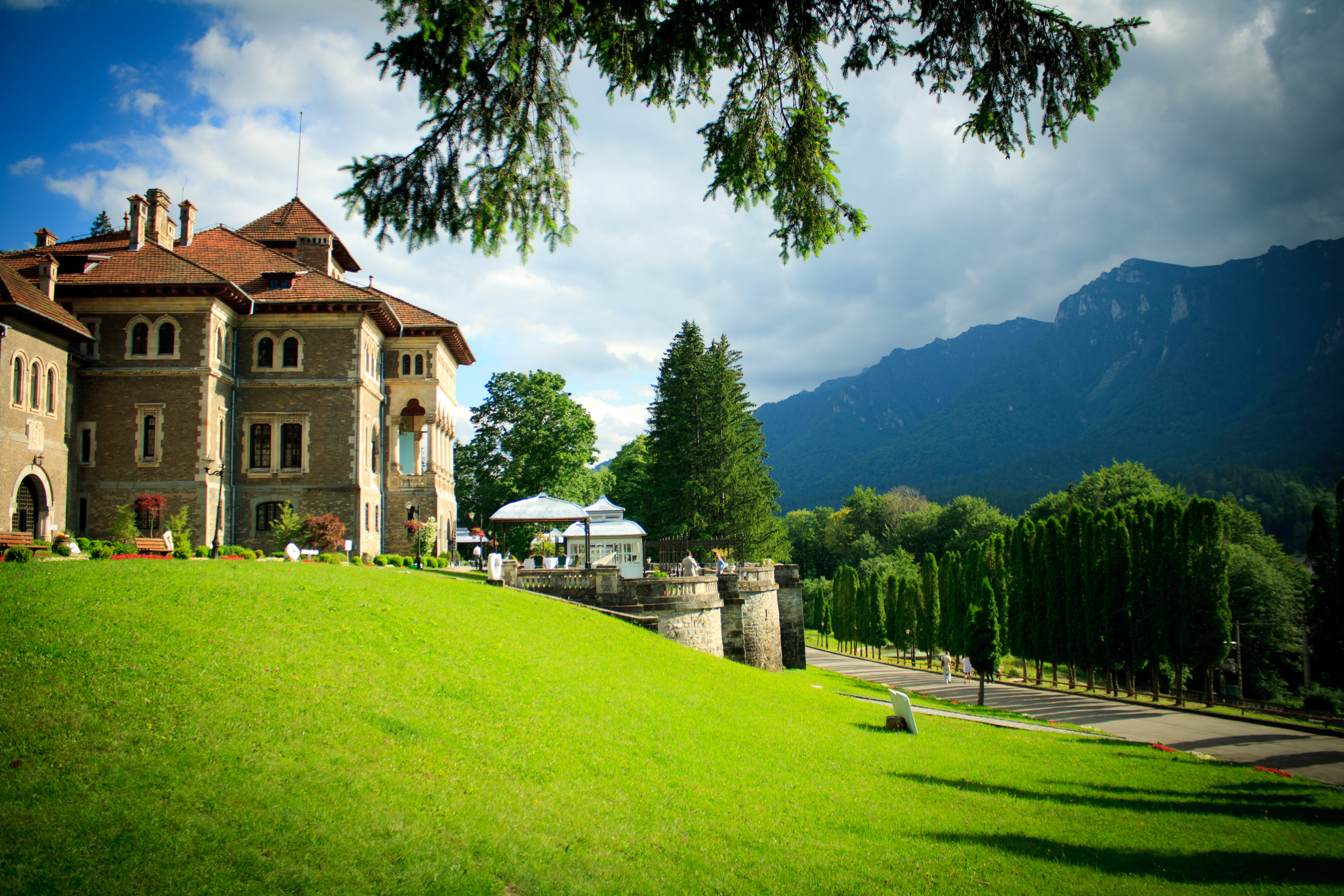

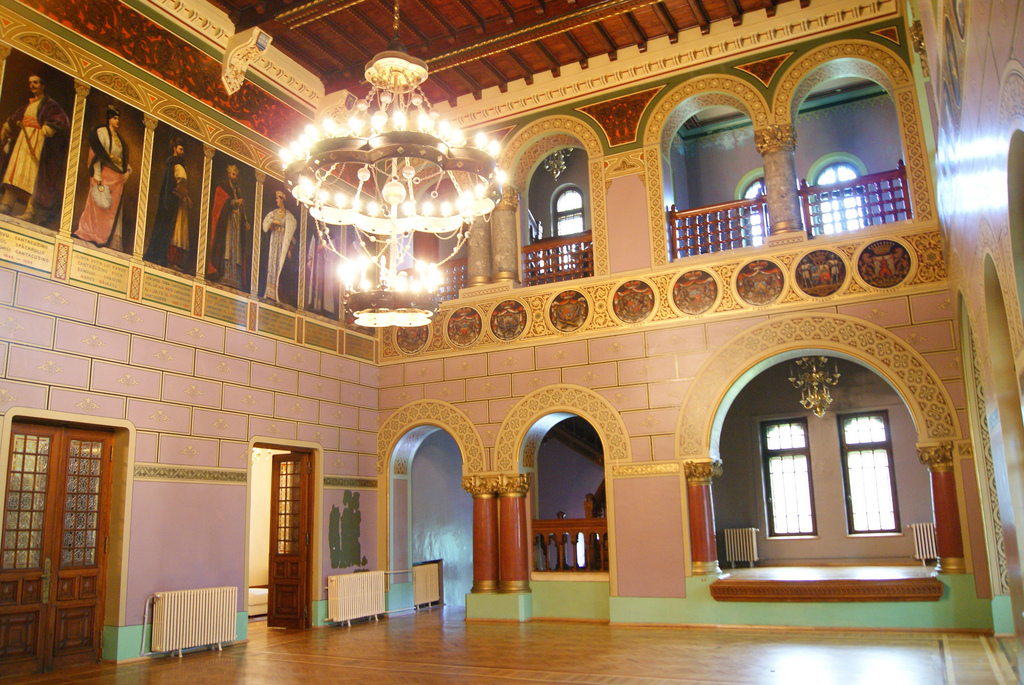

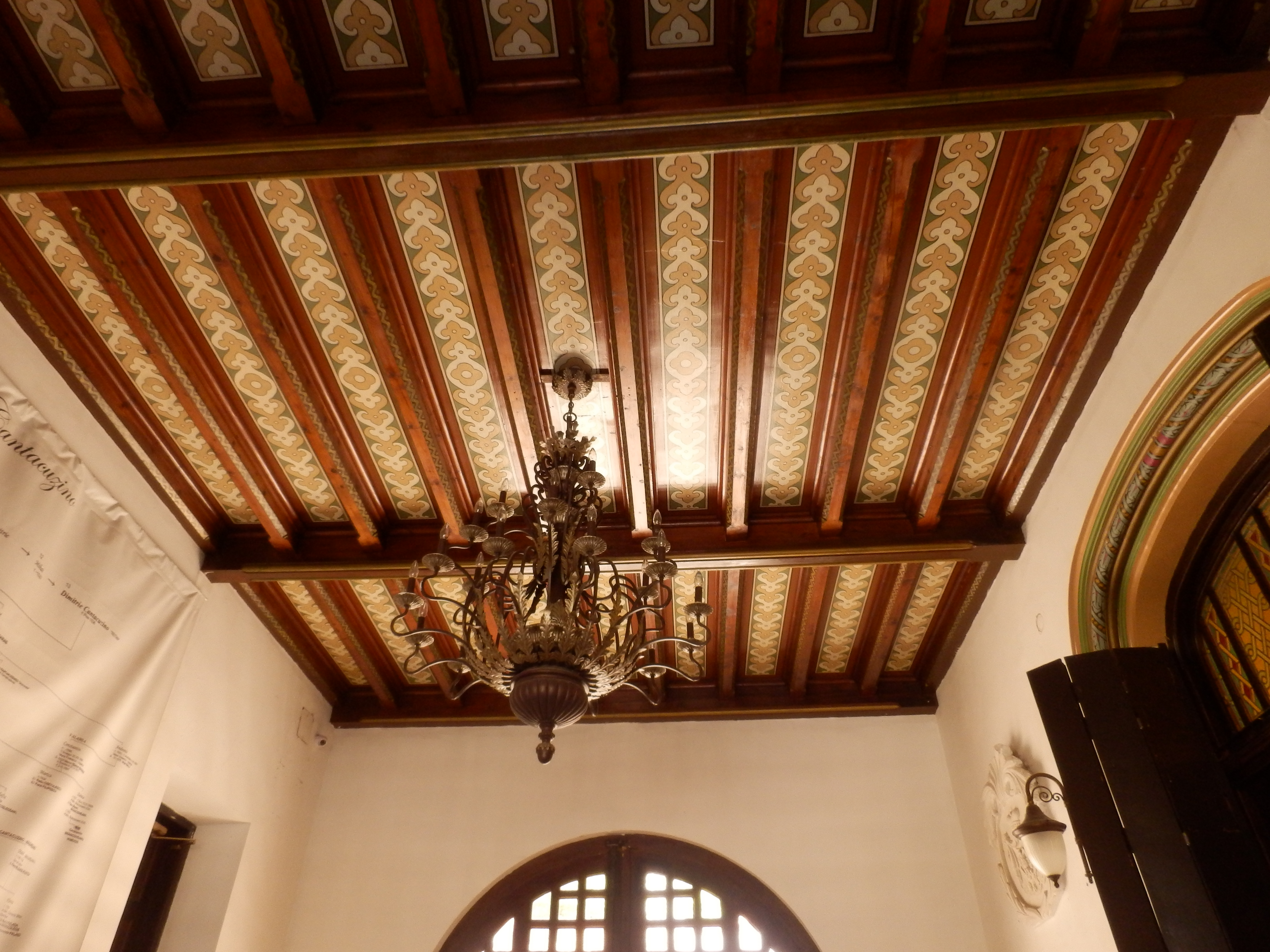

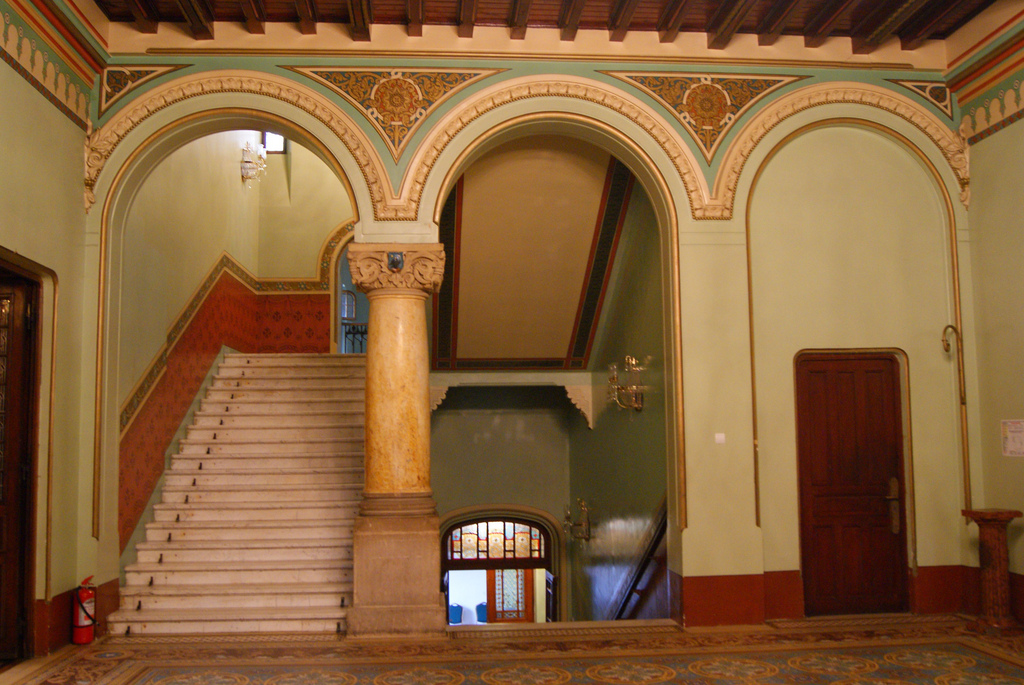

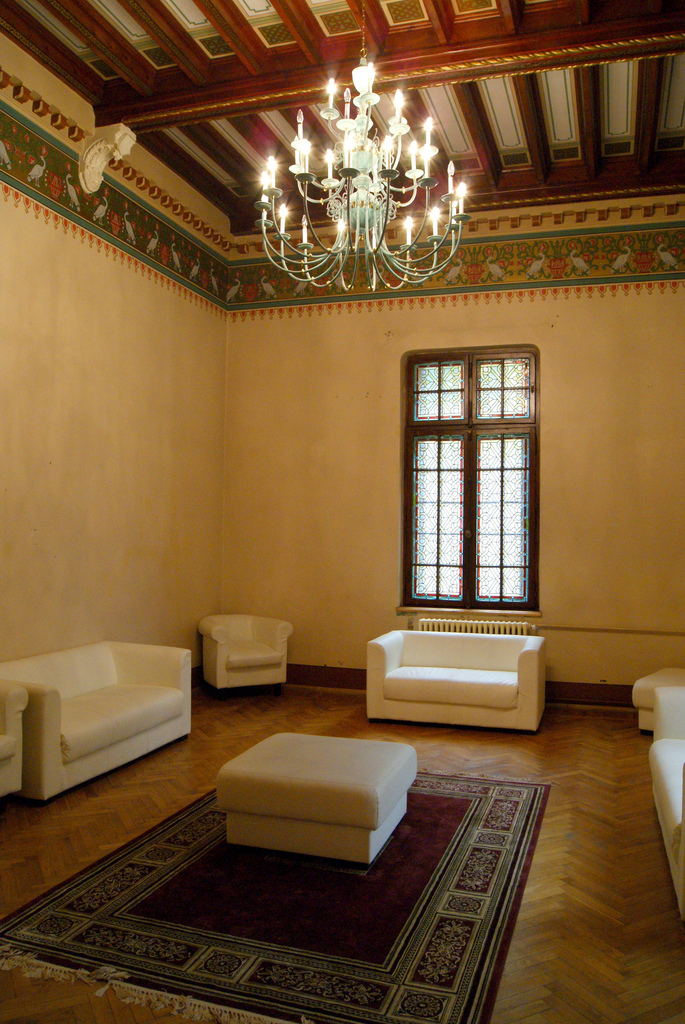

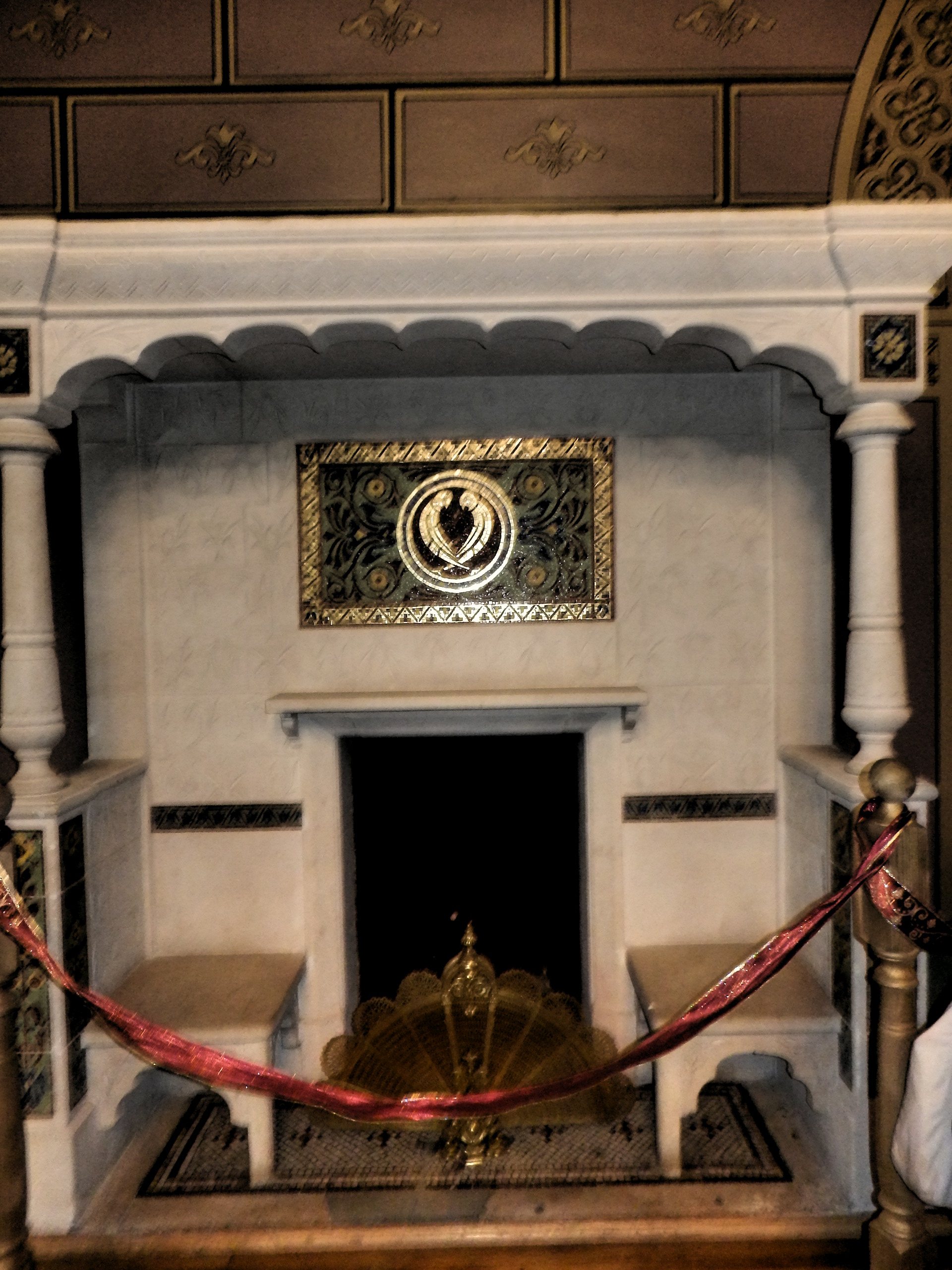

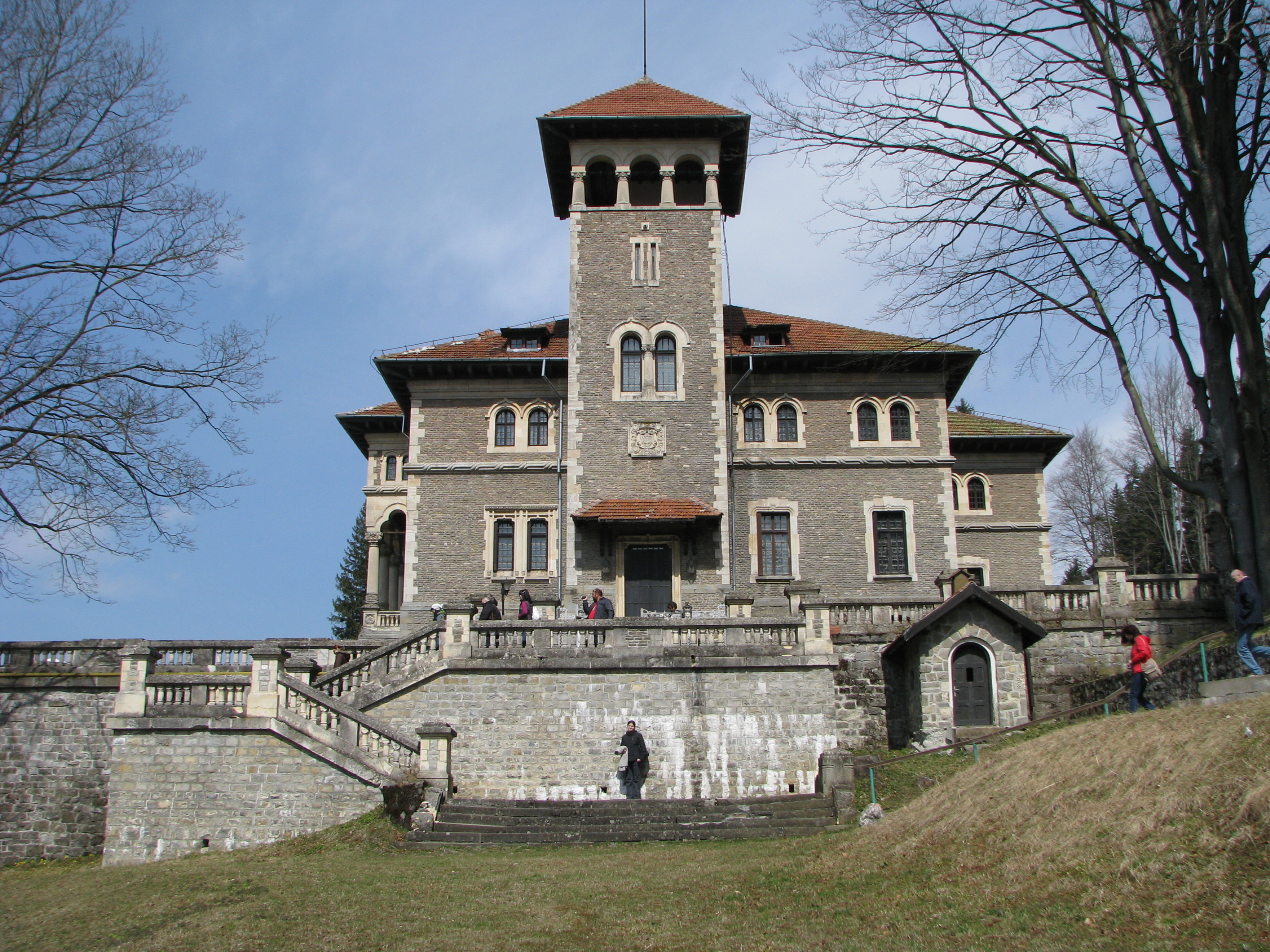

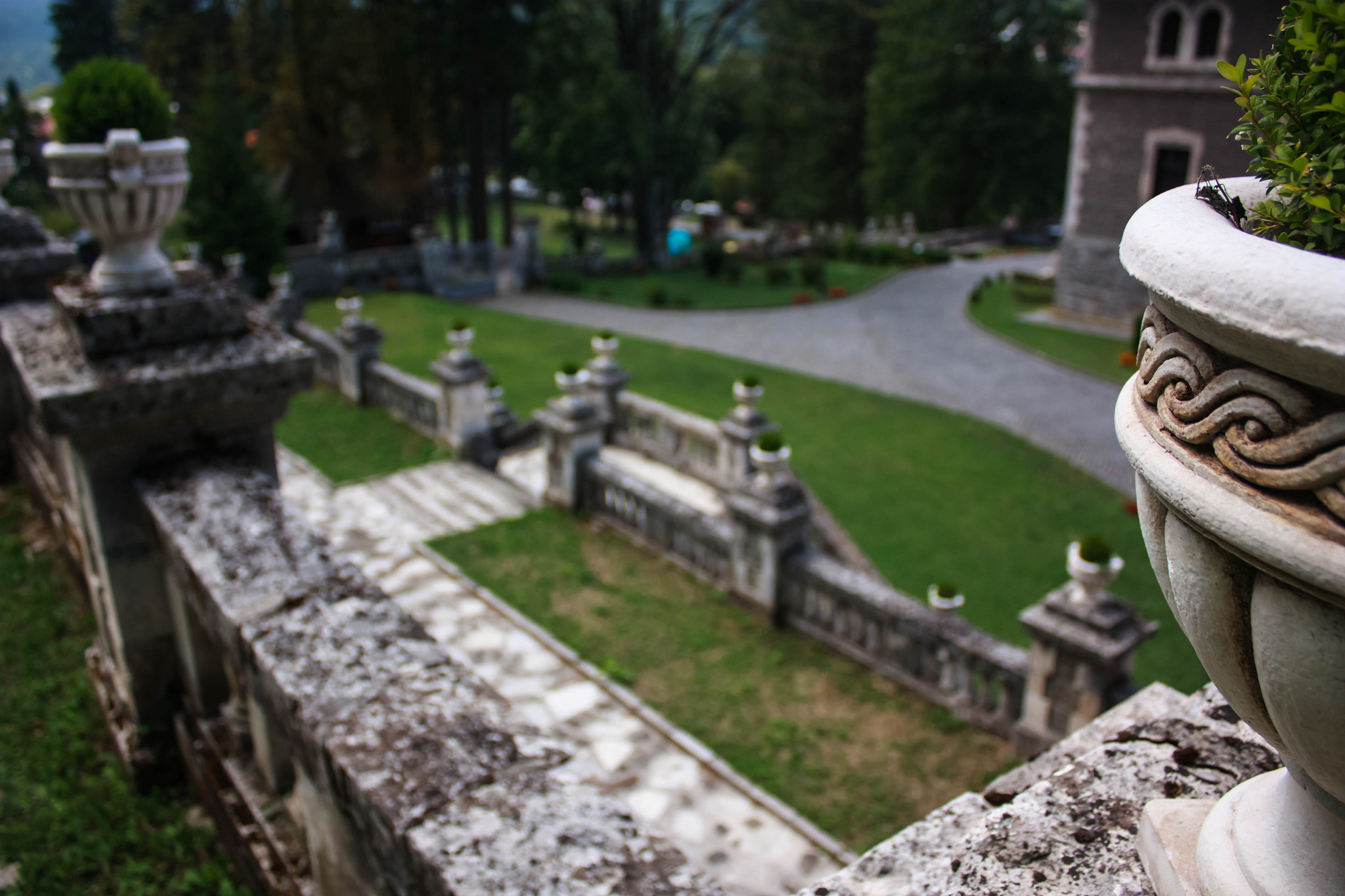

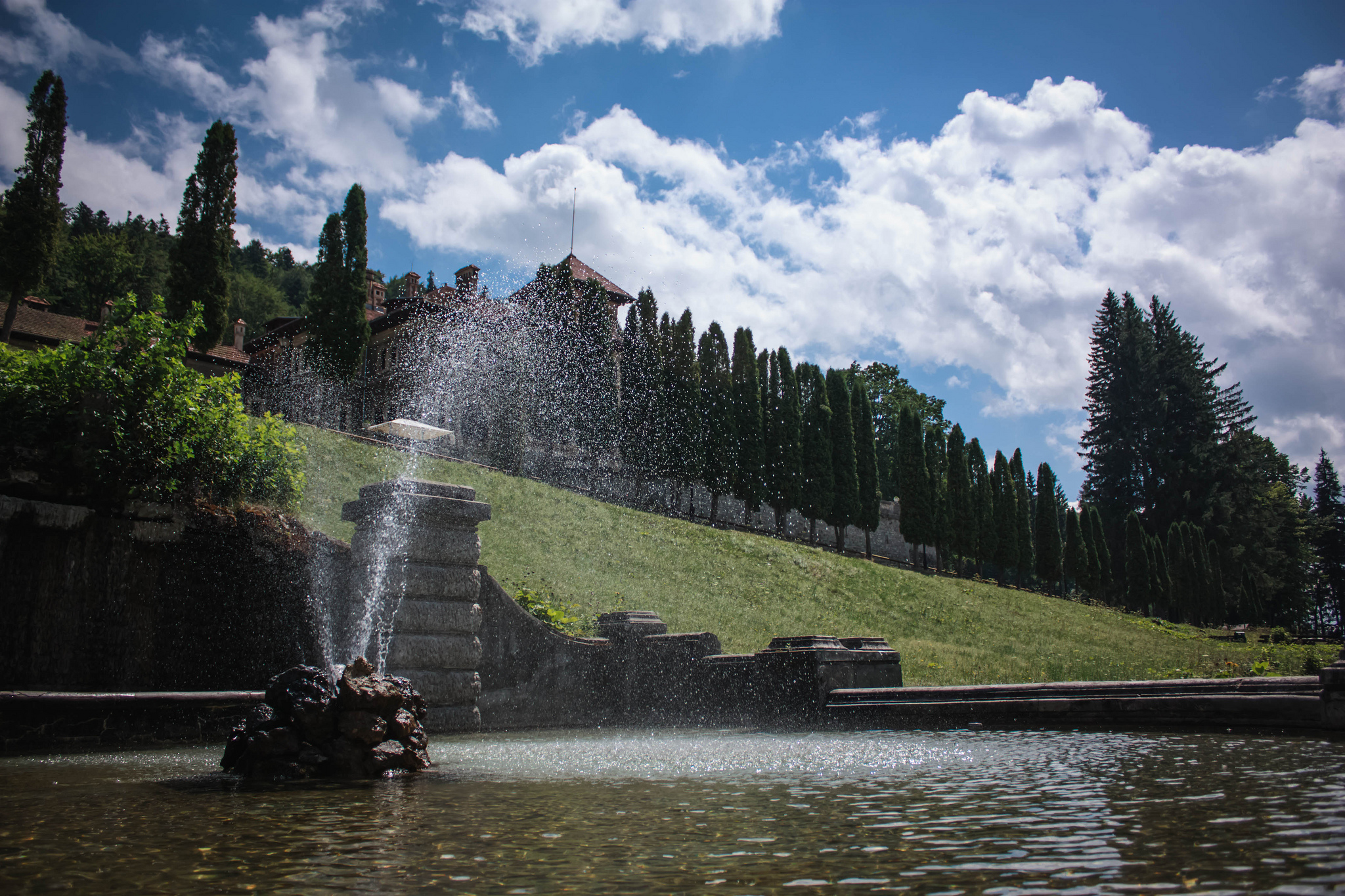

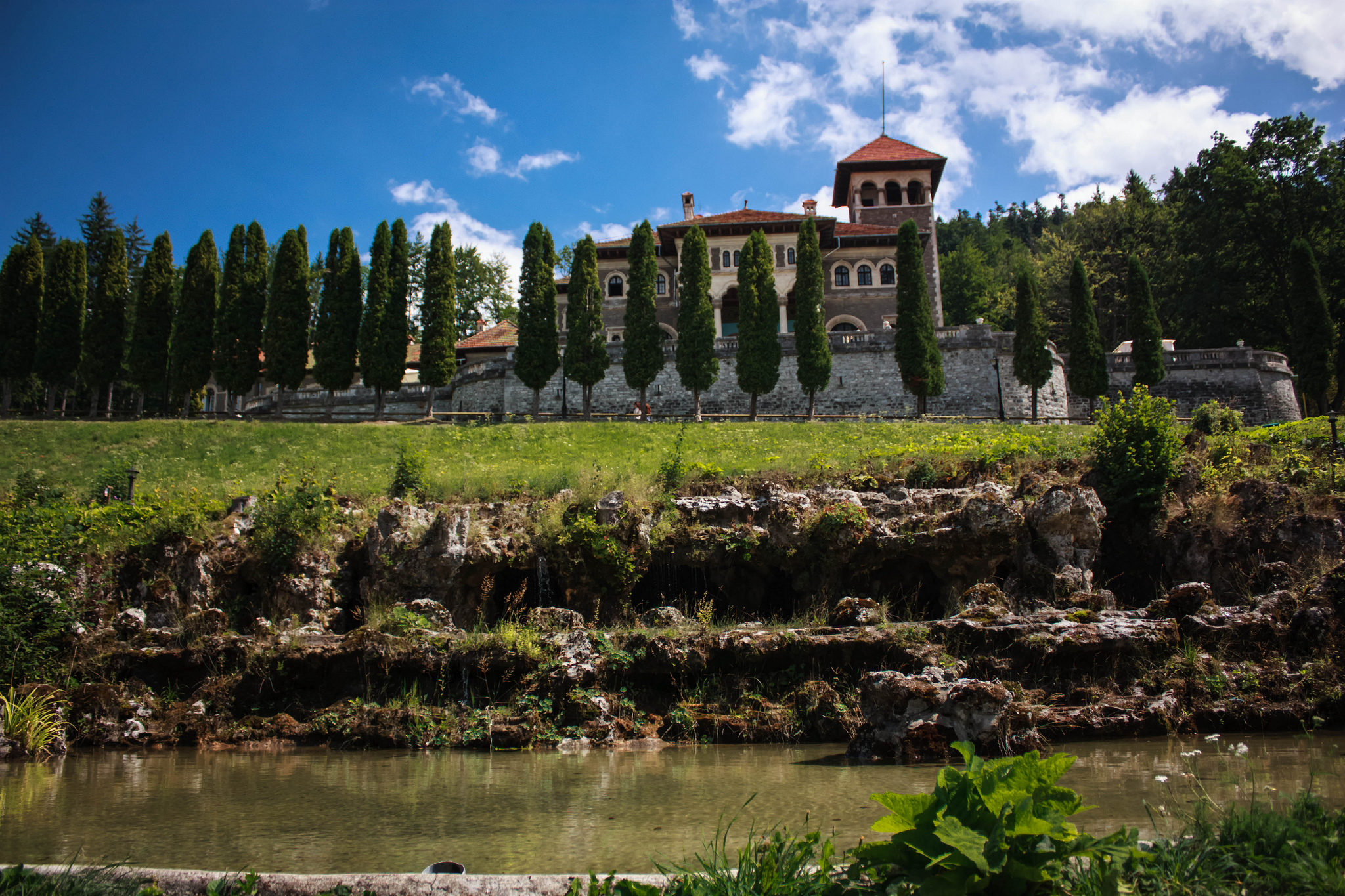

== See also ==
- List of castles in Romania
- Tourism in Romania
