= One Life to Blossom =

2021 American documentary film

- Directed by: Alexandrina Andre
- Produced by: Alexandrina Andre; Nestor Hernandez
- Starring: Blossom C. Brown
- Edited by: Mary Koszycki
- Distributed by: FilmHub; Amazon Prime Video; Revry
- Release date: September 2021
- Running time: 53 min
- Country: United States
- Language: English

One Life to Blossom is a 2021 American documentary film directed by Alexandrina Andre. The film chronicles the life and journey of Blossom C. Brown, a transgender woman and activist, as she navigates her transition and her fight for acceptance and recognition.

== Synopsis ==
One Life to Blossom is a documentary film that follows the life of black transgender activist Blossom C. Brown. The film chronicles Blossoms's journey to achieve her dream of undergoing facial feminization surgery, all within a year before making headlines at the 2019 CNN LGBTQ Town Hall.

Raised in Jackson, Mississippi, Blossom faced significant challenges with her identity and health, including being diagnosed with HIV at seventeen. Blossom overcame racial and gender prejudices to become the first transgender woman to graduate from Mississippi University for Women.

The documentary provides an intimate look at Blossom C. Brown's life, detailing her experiences growing up in Mississippi, her transition journey, and her advocacy efforts. Through personal interviews, archival footage, and candid moments, the film explores themes of identity, resilience, and the struggle for equality.

== Production ==
One Life to Blossom was produced by Alexandrina Andre, who also served as the writer and director. The film was shot over the course of 3 years, capturing pivotal moments in Brown's life and activism. The footage was also filmed during Brown's appearance at the 2019 CNN Townhall with Don Lemon and Beto O'Rouke.

== Release ==
The documentary premiered at The Pan African Film Festival on February 28, 2021. It was subsequently released on Revry and Amazon Prime Video in September 2021.

== Awards and nominations ==
- 2021 OTB for Best Documentary Feature Film
- 2021 OTB for Best Inspirational Film
- 2022 Tietê International Film Award for Social Awareness
- 2022 Telly Award for Best online direction
