= Rose-Alexandrine Barreau =

French republican soldier(1773–1843)

- Born: May 1773; Tarn, France
- Died: 24 January 1843 (aged 69); Avignon, France
- Spouse: François Leyrac
- Military career
- Allegiance: French First Republic
- Branch: Army
- Service years: 1792–1793
- Units: 2nd Battalion of the Tarn; 63rd Demi-Brigade

Rose-Alexandrine Barreau (1773–1843), also known as "Liberté" Barreau, was a female soldier of the Army of the French First Republic. She became best known for her actions fighting against the Spanish Empire during an incursion near Biriatou in July 1793.

== Biography ==
Rose-Alexandrine Barreau was born in May 1773 in the Tarn area of France. She married François Leyrac on 5 March 1792, and signed up alongside her new husband and her brother Cyprien Barreau for the 2nd Battalion of the Tarn in the Army of the French First Republic. She was listed in records as "Liberté" Barreau, a "son of Jacques and Jeanne Barreau". Barreau and the rest of the Battalion were subsequently amalgamated into the 63rd Demi-Brigade.

It was against a Spanish Empire incursion into France at Biriatou in July 1793 that she would become known. Under the command of Théophile Corret de la Tour d'Auvergne, they were engaged by the Spanish forces. First Barreau witnessed the death of her brother, and then her husband was seriously injured. Barreau moved further forward with the other infantry, before rushing into enemy fire where she fired her musket until she ran out of ammunition. At that point, she charged the enemy with her saber.

Following the end of the battle, she went to her husband's side and tended his wounds. After a year and two months of military service, Barreau was discharged from the infantry, as she had been experiencing complications from being six months pregnant. The National Convention granted her 300 livre tournois in recognition of her service, and the following years she remained in the train following the army as her husband continued to serve. The 1793 Annales du Civisme et de la Vertu characterized her as a national hero. In 1806 Barreau received a military pension. By 1809 she had five children. After falling ill, she petitioned for treatment as a veteran; it was not until 1832, however, that she and her husband were admitted to the veterans' hospital in Avignon. She died there on 24 January 1843.
