= Alexandrina Hristov =

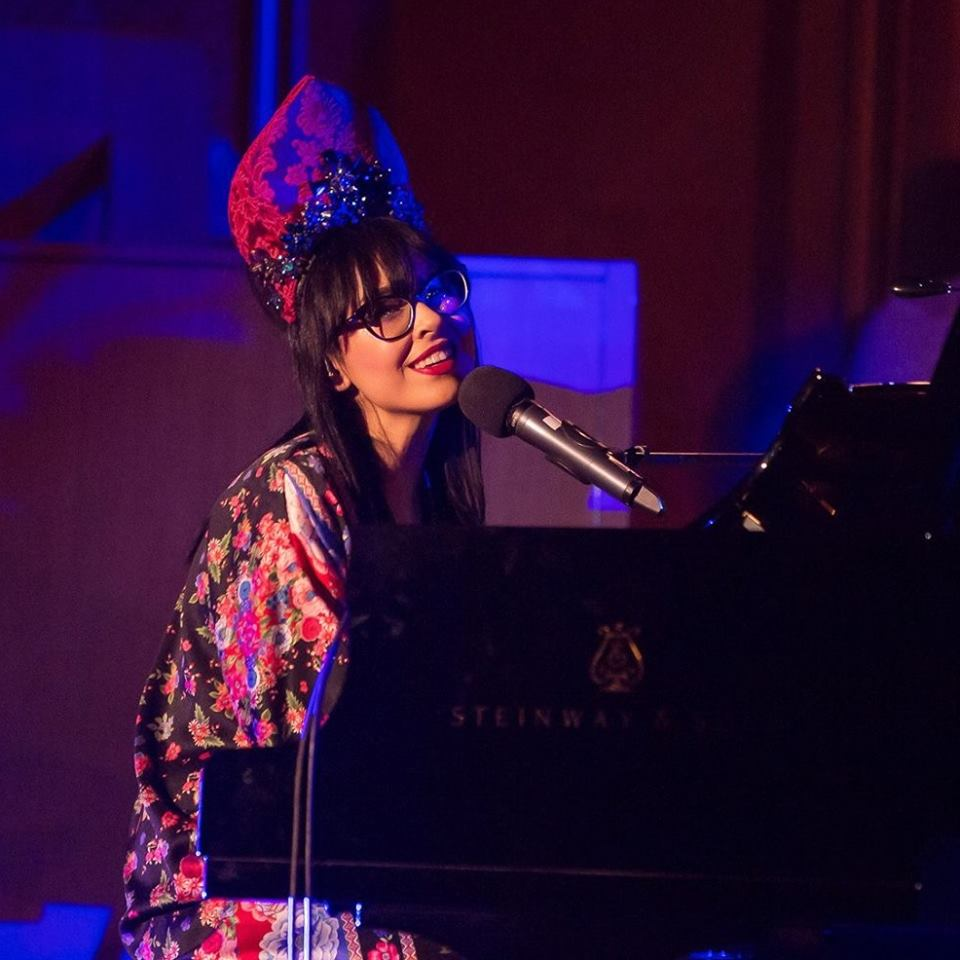
- Hristov in 2018

Background information
- Born: 5 May 1978 (age 47); Chișinău, Moldavian SSR, Soviet Union
- Genres: Alternative Rock, indie pop, jazz, soul
- Occupations: Singer, actress, painter
- Instruments: Voice, piano, guitar

Alexandrina Hristov (born 5 May 1978) is a Moldovan singer, who became popular with her song "Fata merge pe jos" ("The girl walks") from the album "Om de lut" ("The Clay Man") released in 2009. She is also a painter and an actress.

== Life and career ==
Alexandrina Hristov grew up in a family of artists. Her father is the painter Victor Hristov and her mother was an actress and a singer. Hristov started playing the piano and composing her own songs at the age of 8.

She graduated from the Academy of Music, Theatre and Fine Arts in Chișinău and has incorporated painting and poetry in her music since then. In 2005 she played a main part in Paul Cuzuioc's movie "Trois femmes de Moldavie", whose soundtrack also included some of her songs. That same year she moved together with her family to Romania where she played a series of concerts at Cafe Deko in Bucharest.

In 2009, Hristov released her first album, "Omul de lut"("The Clay Man") which included songs such as "Printre flori"("Among flowers"), "Roule le taxi" and "Maria (de leagăn)"("Maria (lullaby)"). Hristov was appreciated for her special voice and artistic approach. Over the past years Hristov has performed at Untold Festival, Gărâna Jazz Festival, Peștera Bolii Festival and Transilvania International Film Festival. She also appeared at several Romanian TV shows on Pro TV, TVR1 and Antena1 channels. She gained most of her fans through her performances, as well as on the internet and peer-to-peer networks.

In 2016, Hristov toured Romania with her “10 Year Anniversary” tour, performing concerts in Iași, Timișoara, Cluj-Napoca, and Bucharest. The production incorporated a three-wall light show and the use of a theremin as part of the live performances.

== Musical style and influences ==
Hristov sings in Romanian, French and Russian. Her unique style is influenced by an array of genres, including acoustic, rock, jazz and soul. Hristov counts PJ Harvey, Björk and Morcheeba as her main influences. The greatest one is Tori Amos, with whom she shares the joy of piano playing and the quirkiness of the lyrics.

== Albums ==
The first album "Om de lut" ("The Clay Man"), released on April 9, 2009, included a collection of old and new songs. Hristov's described it as: "'The Clay Man' is my child, a beautiful child, healthy, gentle[...].His heart beats on jazz, soul, funk and electropop rhythms. The Clay Man will sing about wonder, flight, quest, ships and seas, planes, green eyes, nostalgia and insomnia, flowers and nerves, Zorro and Prince Charming... love and the cosmos, women, rain, wind, about the King and the Queen."

The second album, "Flori de Spin" ("Flowers of Thorns") was released on 5 April 2014 and contains the hit singles "Orasul Umbre" ("Shadow City"), "Pijamale Reci"("Cold Pijamas"), "Te iubesc" ("I Love You") and the theme song, "Flori de Spin" ("Flowers of Thorns"). "Orasul Umbre" was featured as theme of the "Umbre" HBO Romania series.

In 2016, Alexandrina released two new songs, called "Dupa Pod" and "Viberi Menya" (in Russian). In 2019 Alexandrina released her first song in English, "Second Bliss" whose video features besides Alexandrina also her daughter, Valentina. In 2021 Alexandrina released a new song, "Vânt în pânze". In 2022 Alexandrina released her first EP in English, "Sirin".
