= Friend or Woe =

- Wednesday episode
- Wednesday's "pilgrim monologue" has received praise and analysis
- Episode no.: Season 1 Episode 3
- Directed by: Tim Burton
- Written by: Kayla Alpert
- Original air date: November 23, 2022

Episode chronology
← Previous "Woe is the Loneliest Number"	Next → "Woe What a Night"

"Friend or Woe" is the third episode of the first season of the Netflix television series Wednesday. Released on November 23, 2022, along with the rest of the first season, it was directed by Tim Burton and written by Kayla Alpert. The episode, filmed halfway through the first season's production, follows Wednesday Addams as her investigation into a dire prophecy leads her to a pilgrim-themed amusement park.

"Friend or Woe" has received lukewarm and positive reviews. Actress Jenna Ortega, who portrays Wednesday in the series, has considered it her favorite episode of the first season. Several moments have been well received, while some journalists have considered the episode unimpressive. Inspired by and often compared to the 1993 film Addams Family Values, the episode has been described as the first season's "thesis" in its critique of settler colonialism.

== Plot ==
Wednesday discovers that her kidnappers are Nevermore Academy's Nightshade Society, an "elite social club" she had thought was disbanded. Xavier suggests that the group invite Wednesday to join, citing her parents' membership. Wednesday declines, frees herself, and leaves peacefully of her own volition. Studying the book which reveals the prophecy that she will be responsible for Nevermore's destruction, Wednesday ponders why it shows her alongside a pilgrim.

Nevermore Academy holds its annual Outreach Day, an event where its outcast students briefly work alongside the "normie" residents of Jericho. Upon their arrival in the town, Xavier reveals to Wednesday that the pilgrim in the book is Joseph Crackstone, Jericho's founding father. He is also a focus of Pilgrim World, an amusement park themed around Jericho's 17th-century colonial settlers. Privately, Walker acknowledges that Jericho financially depends upon Nevermore, while Galpin insinuates that Walker authorized a new statue of Crackstone for personal gain due to his ownership of Pilgrim World. (Note: Lucas establishes that his father is the owner of Pilgrim World in Episode 1.) Wednesday asks Enid to switch volunteer assignments so she can investigate Pilgrim World. Enid accepts the trade to be closer to Ajax. At Pilgrim World, Wednesday gives a speech to a group of tourists about the park's unethical nature. Eugene is bullied by the park's employees before being saved by Wednesday. Walker thanks Weems for donating to his reelection campaign. Eugene reveals that no one has ever defended him; Wednesday responds that he reminds her of her brother. Eugene assists Wednesday's investigation of the park before they are apprehended. Enid flirts with Ajax, and they agree to a date later that night. Wednesday deserts Pilgrim World, and Tyler tells her the location of the ruins of Jericho's real, original meeting house.

At the ruins, Wednesday experiences a vision of the meeting house in the past. Wednesday sees the girl from her previous visions (believed to be her ancestor Goody Addams) sentenced to death by Crackstone and Jericho's settlers for witchcraft. Goody is locked in the meeting house along with other outcasts before the meeting house is set on fire. Goody escapes but warns Wednesday that "he won't stop until he's killed us all". Crackstone emerges and threatens Wednesday directly before she returns to the present. Wednesday wakes up in the middle of a rainstorm and sees Jericho's monster. Tracking the monster, she sees its footprints turn human, revealing its true nature. Xavier arrives. Despite his doubts, Wednesday expresses her belief that Crackstone might be connected to present danger. As an act of revenge, Wednesday and Thing set fire to a new memorial statue of Crackstone at its dedication. As it melts, Wednesday plays Vivaldi's "Winter" from The Four Seasons on her cello. Wednesday admonishes Weems for covering up the town's history, while Weems counters that she is trying to improve outcast-normie relations. A man's camera records him being killed by the monster. Ajax accidentally, temporarily turns himself to stone while preparing for his date, leading Enid to believe she has been stood up; she damages a school bus in anger. The police review the latest murder victim's photos, seeing their first visual evidence of the monster.

== Production ==
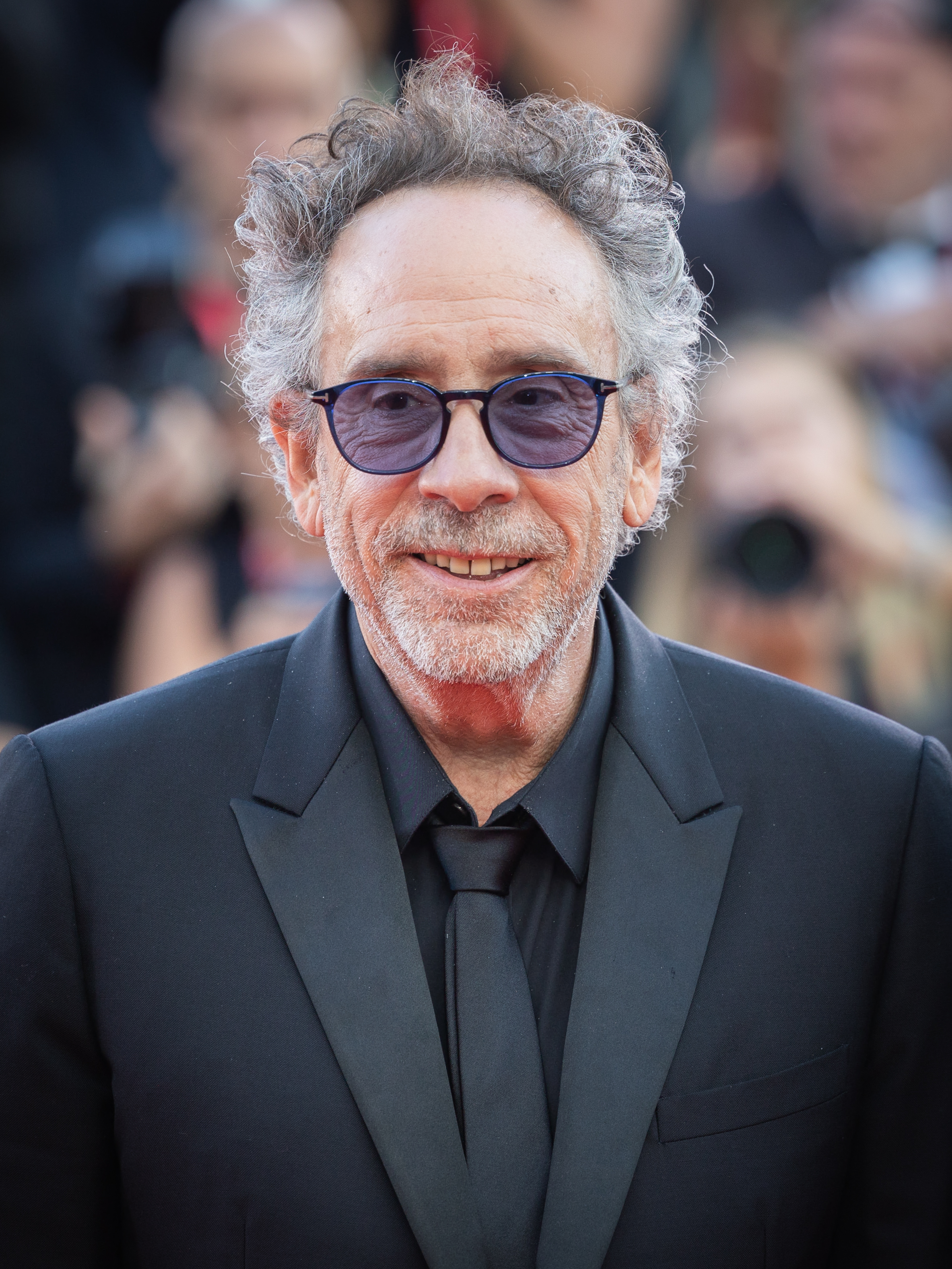
Tim Burton directed "Friend or Woe"

"Friend or Woe" was one of four episodes of Wednesday's first season directed by Tim Burton, while the episode credits Kayla Alpert as its writer. Both Burton and Alpert also served as executive producers on the series. Along with the rest of Jericho, Pilgrim World was constructed as a set at Buftea Studios in Romania. The episode was filmed midway through the production of the first season. As a result, according to lead actress Jenna Ortega, "everyone kind of found their footing and was in the grip of things by the time we shot that.”

== Reception ==
"Friend or Woe" has been praised by Screen Rant's Emily Gilbert, finding the episode to be hilarious. Describing the episode as "Wednesday Addams at her best", Gilbert has urged the series to use the episode as a blueprint for future seasons. Actress Jenna Ortega, who portrays Wednesday in the series, has considered "Friend or Woe" her favorite episode of the first season, calling it "underrated" while citing the statue/cello scene, costumes, fight sequence, and Eugene's presence. Screen Rant's Megan Hemenway has commented that the episode "heightens the tensions of the series".

Gilbert has written that the episode has "some truly iconic moments". Several journalists have highlighted Wednesday's pilgrim monologue. Gilbert has argued that moments like the cello scene "helped cement Ortega's iconic performance" as Wednesday. Screen Rant's Abigail Stevens has considered several moments from the episode among the season's funniest. In particular, Stevens has ranked the episode's opening scene as the season's funniest moment and one of its best moments overall, while CBR's Robert Vaux has considered it one of Ortega's most iconic scenes from the season. Screen Rant's Lynn Sharpe has characterized the vision scene as "intense and disturbing".

Other reviews have been more lukewarm. Screen Rant's Lynn Sharpe has considered "Friend or Woe" to be the second weakest of Burton's episodes in the season, writing that the episode "pales in comparison to the novelty and stylistic feats of the first and fourth episodes". Also writing for Screen Rant, Grace Heinlein has ranked it as the worst episode of the season, writing: "While Episode 3 is not a bad episode of television by any means, it certainly feels like an episode that is less effective. [...] The characters have interesting conversations, and the attack happens at the town square, but while other episodes have a plot that keeps audiences on edge, this episode feels more predictable."

== Themes and analysis ==
=== Settler colonialism and Addams Family Values ===
While series creators Alfred Gough and Miles Millar have confirmed that the season's theme of colonialism was inspired by the Thanksgiving scene from the 1993 film Addams Family Values, several writers have described "Friend or Woe" as an homage to that scene. CBR's Diane Darcy has written: "In Netflix's Wednesday, rejecting settler colonialism is a major theme of the series — so much so that an entire episode ('Friend or Woe') is devoted to making this thesis." CBR's Robert Vaux has observed that the episode's speech is a reversal of the film's speech, as Wednesday changes from being forced to dress as Pocahontas to be forced to dress as a pilgrim. Similarly, several writers for Continuum have written: "Where in Addams Family Values it is the white settlers in the Thanksgiving play who are burned, Wednesday reverses this narrative device while still retaining Wednesday’s critique of settler colonialism." Writing for Communication Monographs, Camille Bassett and Jason Gilmore have commented that "Wednesday’s denunciation of whitewashing [in her speech in 'Friend or Woe' brings] to mind the whitewashing of Wednesday herself as a character".

=== Nothing Else Matters ===
CBR's Rebecca Tierney has examined the episode's use of Apocalyptica's string cover of Metallica's ballad "Nothing Else Matters". Tierney has considered "Nothing Else Matters" thematically fitting for the episode, the series, and this series's rendition of Wednesday Addams. She has observed several similarities between the context of the song's release and the series: the song released in 1991 (the same year as The Addams Family), it reflected Metallica's shift towards a more pop-friendly musical style (which "mirrors" Wednesday's storyline in the series), and Apocalyptica started as a Metallica tribute band (which Tierney has described as "appropriately apt" for this iteration of Wednesday).

Examining the song itself, Tierney has written that "the inclusion of 'Nothing Else Matters' can be seen as a metaphor — and foreshadowing — of the Wednesday series as a whole." She has drawn a connection between the song's lyrics and Wednesday's internal conflict in the series. Tierney has written that "Friend or Woe" is "littered with parts that mirror the deeper meaning" of the song.

== Sources ==
- Balkin, Sarah; Dane, Alexander; Driscoll, Beth; O'Meara, Radha; Vincent, Caitlin (July 3, 2025). "Authorship across media: considering Wednesday Addams". Continuum. 39 (4). Taylor & Francis: 632–645. doi:10.1080/10304312.2025.2518968. hdl:11343/356982.
- Bassett, Camille; Gilmore, Jason (February 10, 2025). "Shifting the paradigm with Wednesday Addams: An intersectional analysis of the first (Autistic) female Latinx detective". Communication Monographs. 92 (3). Taylor & Francis: 626–652. doi:10.1080/03637751.2025.2455715.
