= Wednesday (TV series) =

American supernatural mystery television series (2022–present)

- Genre: Black comedy; Coming-of-age; Gothic; Horror; Mystery; Supernatural drama; Fantasy
- Created by: Alfred Gough; Miles Millar
- Based on: Characters by Charles Addams
- Showrunners: Alfred Gough; Miles Millar
- Starring: Jenna Ortega; Gwendoline Christie; Riki Lindhome; Jamie McShane; Hunter Doohan; Percy Hynes White; Emma Myers; Joy Sunday; Georgie Farmer; Naomi J. Ogawa; Christina Ricci; Moosa Mostafa; Steve Buscemi; Isaac Ordonez; Owen Painter; Billie Piper; Luyanda Unati Lewis-Nyawo; Victor Dorobantu; Noah B. Taylor; Evie Templeton; Luis Guzmán; Catherine Zeta-Jones
- Theme music composer: Danny Elfman
- Composers: Danny Elfman (S1); Chris Bacon
- Country of origin: United States
- Original language: English
- No. of seasons: 2
- No. of episodes: 16

Production
- Executive producers: Alfred Gough; Miles Millar; Tim Burton; Steve Stark; Andrew Mittman; Gail Berman; Kayla Alpert; Jonathan Glickman; Tommy Harper; Kevin Lafferty; Kevin Miserocchi; Karen Richards; Meredith Averill
- Producer: Carmen Pepelea
- Cinematography: David Lanzenberg; Stephan Pehrsson; PJ Dillon; John Conroy
- Editors: Jay Prychidny; Ana Yavari; Paul Day; Dan Briceno
- Running time: 48–69 minutes
- Production companies: Millar Gough Ink; Tim Burton Productions; Toluca Pictures; MGM Television

Original release
- Network: Netflix
- Release: November 23, 2022 – present

Wednesday is an American supernatural mystery comedy television series based on the character Wednesday Addams by Charles Addams. Created by Alfred Gough and Miles Millar, it stars Jenna Ortega as the titular character, with Luis Guzmán and Catherine Zeta-Jones portraying her parents in the series. Four episodes of each season were directed by Tim Burton, who serves as executive producer. The series revolves around Wednesday Addams, who attempts to solve murder mysteries at her new school.

Burton was previously approached to direct the 1991 film The Addams Family and was later involved in a canceled stop-motion animated film featuring the Addams Family. In October 2020, he was reported to be helming a television series, which was later given a series order by Netflix. Ortega was cast in part to represent the character's Latina heritage. Christina Ricci, who had played Wednesday in the 1991 film and its 1993 sequel Addams Family Values, was asked by Burton to join the series in a supporting role.

Wednesday premiered on November 16, 2022, and was released on Netflix on November 23 to positive reviews from critics; Ortega's performance received critical acclaim. Within three weeks of release, it became the second-most watched English-language Netflix series. It received three Golden Globe nominations: one for Best Television Series – Musical or Comedy and two for Best Actress – Television Series Musical or Comedy for Ortega. It also won four Primetime Emmy Awards, while receiving nominations for Outstanding Comedy Series and Outstanding Lead Actress in a Comedy Series for Ortega. In January 2023, the series was renewed for a second season, which premiered on August 6, 2025; the second half was released on September 3. In July 2025, the series was renewed for a third season.

== Premise ==
Wednesday Addams is expelled from Nancy Reagan High School after dumping live piranhas into the school's pool in retaliation for the boys' water polo team bullying her brother Pugsley. Consequently, her parents Gomez and Morticia Addams transfer her to their high school alma mater Nevermore Academy, a private school that was established for outcasts and monsters, in the town of Jericho, Vermont. Wednesday's cold, emotionless personality and her defiant nature make it difficult for her to connect with her schoolmates, especially her roommate, Enid Sinclair. It causes her on multiple occasions to run afoul of the school's principal, Larissa Weems. However, she discovers she has inherited her mother's psychic abilities, which allow her to solve a local murder mystery.

In the second season, Wednesday returns to Nevermore and – while developing her psychic abilities – must face a new tormentor and prevent her roommate's death, Pugsley enrolls at Nevermore, and Weems' successor Barry Dort has Morticia take on a fundraising role while he looks after his own interests that involve Grandmama Frump.

== Cast and characters ==
- Jenna Ortega as Wednesday Addams, a teenager who possesses psychic abilities
  - Ortega also portrays Goody Addams (season 1), Wednesday's deceased ancestor from the 1600s, who appears in her visions
  - Karina Váradi (season 1) and Emily Ring (season 2) portray a young Wednesday Addams
- Gwendoline Christie as Larissa Weems (season 1; recurring season 2), the shapeshifting principal of Nevermore Academy and a former student who was Morticia's roommate. During the second season, Weems returns as Wednesday's spirit guide because they are 13th cousins twice removed.
  - Oliver Wickham portrays a young Larissa Weems
- Riki Lindhome as Dr. Valerie Kinbott (season 1), Wednesday's Nevermore-appointed therapist from the town of Jericho
- Jamie McShane as Donovan Galpin (season 1; recurring season 2), the sheriff of Jericho
  - Ben Wilson portrays a young Donovan Galpin
- Hunter Doohan as Tyler Galpin, a local coffee shop barista and Sheriff Galpin's son, who is later revealed to be a Hyde
- Percy Hynes White as Xavier Thorpe (season 1), a psychic student at Nevermore who experiences visions during his dreams and can make art come to life
- Emma Myers as Enid Sinclair, Wednesday's werewolf roommate in Ophelia Hall at Nevermore
- Joy Sunday as Bianca Barclay, a siren queen bee in Puck Hall at Nevermore and Xavier's ex-girlfriend
- Georgie Farmer as Ajax Petropolus, a gorgon student at Nevermore who has a romantic interest in Enid
- Naomi J. Ogawa as Yoko Tanaka (season 1), a vampire student at Nevermore
- Christina Ricci as Marilyn Thornhill / Laurel Gates (season 1; guest season 2), the botany teacher at Nevermore and dorm mother of Wednesday and Enid. Ricci previously portrayed Wednesday Addams in The Addams Family and Addams Family Values.
- Moosa Mostafa as Eugene Ottinger, a student in Caliban Hall at Nevermore with the ability to control bees and later other types of arthropods
- Steve Buscemi as Barry Dort (season 2), the pyrokinetic successor of Principal Weems at Nevermore Academy
- Isaac Ordonez as Pugsley Addams (season 2–present; guest season 1), Wednesday's younger brother. In the second season, he begins to develop the ability to generate static electricity similar to his uncle.
- Owen Painter as Isaac Night / "Slurp" (season 2), the reanimated corpse of a former student at Nevermore with mad scientist proclivities
- Billie Piper as Isadora Capri (season 2–present), a former child prodigy and werewolf music teacher at Nevermore
- Luyanda Unati Lewis-Nyawo as Ritchie Santiago (season 2–present; recurring season 1), a deputy of Sheriff Galpin. In the second season, she is the new sheriff of Jericho following Galpin's resignation.
- Victor Dorobantu as Thing (season 2–present; recurring season 1), a sentient disembodied hand who is sent to watch over Wednesday at Nevermore
- Noah B. Taylor as Bruno Yuson (season 2), a werewolf student in Thisbe Hall at Nevermore
- Evie Templeton as Agnes DeMille (season 2–present), Wednesday's obsessed fan and a student in Ophelia Hall at Nevermore with the ability to turn invisible
- Luis Guzmán as Gomez Addams (season 2–present; guest season 1), Wednesday's lawyer father and Morticia's passionate husband
  - Lucius Hoyos portrays a young Gomez Addams
- Catherine Zeta-Jones as Morticia Addams (née Frump) (season 2–present; guest season 1), Wednesday's mother, who attended Nevermore Academy with her husband when she was younger and is a psychic similar to her daughter
  - Gwen Jones portrays a young Morticia Frump

== Episodes ==
Season	Episodes		Originally released
1	8		November 23, 2022
2	8	4	August 6, 2025
2	8	4	September 3, 2025

=== Season 1 (2022) ===
No. overall	No. in season	Title	Directed by	Written by	Original release date
1	1	"Wednesday's Child Is Full of Woe"	Tim Burton	Alfred Gough & Miles Millar	November 23, 2022
Wednesday Addams, a high-school student, finds her brother Pugsley tied up in a locker. She sees a psychic vision of his bullies, whom she then attempts to kill with piranhas, resulting in her getting expelled. Her parents, Morticia and Gomez, decide to enroll her in Nevermore Academy, their alma mater and a school for outcasts in Jericho, Vermont. Meanwhile, a hiker is killed by an unknown creature near Nevermore. Wednesday's parents release Thing, a sentient disembodied hand, to watch over her. She meets her roommate Enid, her complete opposite and a werewolf who has never completely transformed, and duels with popular girl Bianca, after Bianca bullies a boy named Rowan. Later, Wednesday is nearly killed by a falling gargoyle but is saved by Bianca's ex-boyfriend Xavier. After escaping her court-ordered therapy session, Wednesday meets Tyler, a "normie" barista, who agrees to help her escape from Nevermore. However, she is apprehended by Principal Larissa Weems and taken back to the school. Later, Tyler and Wednesday meet at the local carnival, and Wednesday has a vision of Rowan's death. Rowan attempts to kill her, but is murdered by a monster, which saves Wednesday's life.
2	2	"Woe Is the Loneliest Number"	Tim Burton	Alfred Gough & Miles Millar	November 23, 2022
Wednesday convinces a skeptical Sheriff Galpin that the perpetrator of the murders is a monster. Suddenly, Rowan reappears unharmed. Wednesday doubts her sanity and decides to investigate the murders herself. She roams the campus inquiring about Rowan and is told that he has been expelled. Meanwhile, Principal Weems grows worried about Wednesday's visions and keeps close tabs on her. Wednesday confronts a defensive Rowan as he leaves the school and sends Thing to follow him. Thing loses him, and Rowan is revealed to be Principal Weems, who has shapeshifted into him. Wednesday has visions of a book belonging to an old students' society. In her search for the book, she overhears Bianca planning to rig the upcoming student tournament. Wednesday joins Enid to defeat Bianca and win the tournament. Later, Wednesday discovers a hidden library within the school, where she is captured by members of the elite students' society, the Nightshades.
3	3	"Friend or Woe"	Tim Burton	Kayla Alpert	November 23, 2022
Wednesday finds herself tied up and surrounded by members of the Nightshades, including Bianca and Xavier. Wednesday frees herself and leaves the library, taking one of the books with her. Principal Weems orders Wednesday to accompany the high school band to an upcoming town ceremony run by Mayor Noble Walker. A drawing in the purloined book leads her to an exhibition at a local fair, where she notices the painting of a girl she had seen in her visions. In the forest, Wednesday envisions the girl—believed to be an ancestor of hers—escaping the execution of the town's outcasts at the hands of its founder, Joseph Crackstone. Wednesday is ambushed by the monster, which she discovers, by its footprints, to transform into a human. Back in town, Wednesday disrupts the ceremony by having Thing destroy a commemorative statue of Joseph Crackstone and is scolded by Principal Weems. While investigating a crime scene in the forest, police find a camera that captured photographs of the monster.
4	4	"Woe What a Night"	Tim Burton	Kayla Alpert	November 23, 2022
Wednesday and Thing break into the coroner's office to copy the files of the monster's victims. In trying to identify a pattern, she finds that each victim has had body parts surgically removed. Wednesday becomes suspicious of Xavier and follows him into his art studio, where she discovers several drawings of the monster, which lead her to the monster's cave. There, she retrieves one of its claws and gives it to Sheriff Galpin for DNA matching. Wednesday and Tyler attend a school dance together. Meanwhile, classmate Eugene, who is privy to Wednesday's investigative work, witnesses a cloaked figure blow up the monster's cave. The dance is interrupted by Mayor Walker's son, Lucas, who triggers the building's fire sprinklers to spray fake blood in revenge for Wednesday's disruption of the town ceremony. Wednesday senses that Eugene is in danger and heads into the forest, only to find him gravely injured by the monster.
5	5	"You Reap What You Woe"	Gandja Monteiro	April Blair	November 23, 2022
Thirty-two years earlier, Gomez Addams had been arrested at Nevermore on suspicion of killing Garrett Gates, a descendant of Joseph Crackstone. In present time, the Addamses visit Wednesday on Parents' Weekend at Nevermore. A family therapy session is cut short when Wednesday confronts her parents about the suspected murder. Meanwhile, Sheriff Galpin learns that the coroner committed suicide after admitting to fabricating Gates's autopsy report. Galpin concludes that Gomez is guilty and arrests him. In prison, Gomez reveals to Wednesday that he was covering for Morticia, who accidentally killed Garrett. Wednesday and Morticia dig up Garrett's grave to find that he had been lethally poisoned before Morticia stabbed him but are caught by police and arrested. Later, they confront Mayor Walker, who reveals that Garrett intended to poison the entire school due to his father's hatred of outcasts. Mayor Walker agrees to release Gomez after admitting to covering up Garrett's motive. Back at Nevermore, Principal Weems reluctantly admits to covering up Rowan's death by means of shapeshifting in an effort to evade controversy at the school.
6	6	"Quid Pro Woe"	Gandja Monteiro	April Blair	November 23, 2022
Wednesday attempts to summon Goody Addams, an ancestor and fellow psychic who killed Crackstone. During a surprise birthday party, Wednesday has a vision of Goody, who instructs her to seek out the Gates mansion. There, she witnesses Mayor Walker leaving the building and sneaks into his car. After arriving back in town, Mayor Walker is hit by a car and severely injured. Principal Weems locks down the school and forbids Wednesday to leave campus. With Tyler and Enid's help, she escapes and returns to the Gates mansion. There they find evidence that Laurel Gates, Garrett's younger sister, long believed to be dead, might still be alive. They find the severed body parts of the monster's victims in a cellar but are forced to flee after being ambushed by the monster. Wednesday leads Galpin to the cellar, only to find it empty. Wednesday convinces Principal Weems not to expel her so she can further pursue her investigation. At the hospital, an unknown figure kills Mayor Walker.
7	7	"If You Don't Woe Me by Now"	James Marshall	Alfred Gough & Miles Millar and Matt Lambert	November 23, 2022
At Mayor Walker's funeral, Wednesday notices a lurking figure and chases it into the forest. The figure is revealed to be Uncle Fester, who explains to Wednesday that the monster she has been investigating is a Hyde. Together, they retrieve a diary from the Nightshades' library, which reveals that a Hyde must always have a master. Later, they track and follow Xavier, whom they witness meeting in the forest with Dr. Kinbott, Wednesday's therapist. After returning from an interrupted date with Tyler, Wednesday finds her dorm room vandalized, the diary stolen, and Thing gravely injured. Research into Laurel Gates reveals that she is both alive and the master of the Hyde. Wednesday initially suspects Dr. Kinbott, but Dr. Kinbott is killed by the Hyde. Police arrive to arrest Xavier, whom Wednesday believes to be the Hyde. Wednesday meets with Tyler and kisses him but suddenly has a vision of him being the Hyde and runs off.
8	8	"A Murder of Woes"	James Marshall	Alfred Gough & Miles Millar	November 23, 2022
Wednesday and her classmates kidnap Tyler to try to make him confess, but Wednesday is arrested and expelled from Nevermore. Tyler secretly admits to Wednesday that he is the Hyde. Wednesday and Principal Weems visit Eugene at the hospital, where he has come out of his coma. His description of the figure he saw at the monster's cave matches Ms. Thornhill, a teacher at Nevermore. Wednesday and Principal Weems, disguised as Tyler, get Thornhill to confess that she is Laurel Gates and manipulated Tyler into killing the victims to resurrect Joseph Crackstone and wipe out all outcasts. Laurel kills Principal Weems and knocks Wednesday out. Using Wednesday's blood and the stolen body parts, Laurel resurrects Crackstone, who stabs Wednesday and leaves her to die, but Goody appears and heals her. Rushing to help Wednesday, Enid finally transforms into a werewolf and defeats Tyler in his Hyde form. With Bianca's help, Wednesday kills Crackstone, and Eugene defeats Laurel with the aid of his bees. Xavier is released from jail, Tyler is detained, and Wednesday departs Nevermore Academy, which is closing for the remainder of the semester.

=== Season 2 (2025) ===
No. overall	No. in season	Title	Directed by	Written by	Original release date
Part 1
9	1	"Here We Woe Again"	Tim Burton	Alfred Gough & Miles Millar	August 6, 2025
Wednesday returns to Nevermore with Pugsley, who starts his first day, and discovers she is a celebrity. New principal Barry Dort offers her the honor student position at a start-of-year bonfire. In her dorm, she discovers she has a stalker. Principal Dort persuades Morticia to lead a fund-raising committee. After private investigator Carl Bradbury is killed by a murder of crows, former Sheriff Galpin asks Wednesday for help solving the case, but she refuses due to his actions the previous year. Principal Dort pressures Bianca to use her siren skills to raise money for the school. Xavier sends Wednesday a painting, which shows a crow with a blind eye. Wednesday's stalker steals her manuscript. After retrieving her manuscript from the midst of the bonfire, Wednesday publicly rejects all praise for saving the school and storms off. After hearing about a former student with a clockwork heart, who died as a result of his dangerous inventions, Pugsley accidentally revives the student as a zombie. Enid chases after Wednesday, but Wednesday collapses and goes into a seizure after seeing a vision of Enid's tombstone in a crow-infested graveyard.
10	2	"The Devil You Woe"	Paco Cabezas	Matt Lambert	August 6, 2025
Wednesday finds Galpin killed by crows in his home, and her psychic powers fail. During Nevermore's Prank Day, Wednesday finds one of Galpin's eyes placed in her and Enid's dorm room. Pugsley reveals Slurp, the zombie he has chained up and is keeping as a pet, to Eugene, but it eventually escapes. Wednesday goes to Willow Hill Psychiatric Hospital, where Tyler is confined. After meeting with Tyler's psychiatrist, Dr. Rachael Fairburn, Wednesday tells Tyler about his father's death. Enid and her werewolf crush Bruno are kidnapped, and Wednesday solves a series of riddles to free them. Agnes DeMille, a student with invisibility powers, reveals herself as the stalker behind the riddles but denies involvement in Galpin's murder. Bianca tries to persuade Morticia to ask her estranged mother for a donation, but Morticia declines. After Bianca finds that Principal Dort's pendant protects him from the effects of her siren powers, he compels her to use them on Morticia. Thing reveals to Wednesday that Morticia took Goody Addams's book.
11	3	"Call of the Woe"	Paco Cabezas	Valentina Garza	August 6, 2025
Wednesday gets into Galpin's phone and learns about the "Bullpen", a hunting cabin they used as a rendezvous. Wednesday decides to attend Nevermore's first camping trip to investigate, but her parents also come along as chaperones. Pugsley brings along Slurp so that he is not left unattended. A double booking leads Nevermore to compete with the Phoenix Cadets for use of the campsite, and Nevermore wins the capture the flag challenge. At the "Bullpen", Wednesday discovers years of newsclips on the deaths of outcast Willow Hill patients and the name "LOIS" painted on a wall. In a bid to regain Goody's book, Wednesday challenges Morticia to a blind duel, where if Wednesday wins, she gets the book, and if Morticia wins, she can burn the book. They duel, and Morticia defeats Wednesday. When the Phoenix Cadets attempt to raid the campsite, they accidentally release Slurp, who kills their scoutmaster in the process. After Wednesday stops Slurp, he is transferred to Willow Hill, where Laurel Gates is also a new patient.
12	4	"If These Woes Could Talk"	Tim Burton	Lauren Otero	August 6, 2025
Wednesday discovers that Willow Hill death certificates were signed by Augustus Stonehearst, now a patient there. Uncle Fester infiltrates Willow Hill to learn about "LOIS". Grandmama Hester Frump arrives and offers to donate to Nevermore if Goody's book is returned, but Morticia burns it. Uncle Fester's attempt to uncover the truth is thwarted, leading to his imprisonment alongside Slurp, but Wednesday rescues him as Slurp escapes. Wednesday and Uncle Fester discover that LOIS (Long-term Outcast Integration Study) is a secret program to transfer outcasts' powers into normies, and the supposedly deceased Willow Hill patients are still held captive, including an unidentified woman. Judi Spannegel, Dr. Fairburn's assistant and Stonehearst's daughter, reveals her experiments to become an Avian, able to control birds. After Uncle Fester releases the LOIS detainees, Slurp kills Dr. Fairburn and Stonehearst, furthering his regeneration and enabling him to speak. Laurel frees Tyler, but Tyler, in his Hyde form, kills her. As Wednesday helps the mysterious woman escape, Tyler throws Wednesday out of a window and escapes, leaving Wednesday severely injured.
Part 2
13	5	"Hyde and Woe Seek"	Angela Robinson	Erika Vázquez & Siena Butterfield	September 3, 2025
Wednesday, in a coma, discovers that Larissa Weems is her new spirit guide due to being Wednesday's 13th cousin twice removed. After awakening, Wednesday is threatened by Judi, and a disguised Tyler threatens Wednesday and Enid. While Nevermore is celebrating the Outcast Day of Remembrance, Wednesday learns how to control a Hyde from music professor Isadora Capri. Wednesday then meets with Enid and the Nightshades, and tells them her plan to control Tyler. Later that night, Pugsley and Gomez locate Slurp, but Pugsley lets Slurp go when the police arrive. Gomez recognizes Slurp as the supposedly long-deceased student Isaac Night. On the same night, Tyler breaks into Nevermore and follows Enid. He is cornered by her and the Nightshades and transforms into his Hyde form. Wednesday attempts to control Tyler, but she is attacked by another Hyde. Morticia intervenes, and the second Hyde – who turns out to be Tyler's mother Françoise, the mysterious woman Wednesday had rescued – leaves with Tyler. Judi is confronted by Isaac and killed. Enid suddenly turns into a werewolf despite there not being a full moon.
14	6	"Woe Thyself"	Angela Robinson	Alfred Gough & Miles Millar and Kayla Alpert	September 3, 2025
Tyler and Françoise reunite with Isaac, who is Françoise's brother. Isaac tells Françoise he can remove her Hyde and save her. Wednesday attempts to regain her psychic abilities by using a charm from the gravestone of former Nevermore professor Rosaline Rotwood, but is interrupted by Enid. Both of them lose consciousness and wake up in their dorm room, having switched bodies. They each struggle to adjust to each other's personalities. To cure Françoise, Isaac removes the power supply he invented from the mechanism that keeps alive Professor Orloff, a disembodied head, then eats his brain. An invisible Agnes sees him doing this, follows the family to Willow Hill, and warns Enid and Wednesday, before being caught by Tyler. As Isaac prepares to cure Françoise, Wednesday and Enid arrive and free Agnes, who sabotages the machinery. Tyler attempts to attack them but is stopped by Wednesday as Enid's wolf-self. Everyone escapes as the machine explodes. Wednesday and Enid return to Rotwood's grave where they reveal what they learned about each other, allowing them to return to their own bodies. Weems ominously tells Wednesday that she prevented Enid's death, but it is now an Addams who will die.
15	7	"Woe Me the Money"	Tim Burton	Teleplay by : Matt Lambert & James Madejski; Story by : James Madejski	September 3, 2025
In 2008, pyrokinetic Barry Dort enlists failed actor Arnold Hunt to act as leader of the Morning Song cult, where Bianca and her mother Gabrielle had been held. In the present, Principal Dort uses Bianca's siren abilities to make Grandmama Frump promise all her money to Nevermore. Elsewhere, Isaac treats Françoise with blood transfusions from Tyler. When Ajax, worried about Bianca, tells Wednesday about Principal Dort's crimes, Wednesday plans to expose Dort. Meanwhile, Dort incinerates Bianca's stepfather Arnold Hunt in front of her. At the gala Masquerade Ball, Enid and Agnes perform a dance, during which Agnes, while invisible, steals Principal Dort's anti-Siren pendant. After Ajax rescues Gabrielle, Bianca uses her truth spell to compel Dort to confess his crimes, but he seizes Bianca as a hostage. Ajax uses his gorgon powers to turn Dort to stone, enabling Bianca to escape before a chandelier, whose rope had been burned by his powers, falls on Dort, shattering his stone body. As forensics picks up Dort's pieces, Wednesday blackmails Grandmama Frump into donating a worthy sum to Nevermore in Gomez's honor. Then she discovers Isaac has kidnapped Pugsley.
16	8	"This Means Woe"	Tim Burton	Alfred Gough & Miles Millar & James Madejski	September 3, 2025
Wednesday learns that Isaac's original effort to cure Françoise required the electrical powers Gomez formerly possessed, and he now plans to use Pugsley in turn. Wednesday confronts Isaac, who reveals that Thing is actually his hand, which he forcibly reattaches before burying Wednesday alive. Enid risks permanently becoming an alpha werewolf to dig Wednesday up before fleeing the scene. At Iago Tower, Françoise has Isaac forcibly restrain Tyler to cure him in her place. When Wednesday frees him, Tyler, in his Hyde form, attacks Isaac, forcing Françoise to transform to fight Tyler before falling to her death. The lab explodes, but everyone survives, preventing Wednesday's premonition. Before Isaac can kill Wednesday, Thing breaks free from his control and rips out his mechanical heart, killing him for good. In the aftermath, Nevermore shuts down early once again. Capri invites a grieving Tyler to join a secret pack of Hydes as she is part-Hyde; Tyler accepts. Wednesday, Uncle Fester, and Thing head north to find Enid. Wednesday has a vision of her deranged maternal Aunt Ophelia, who is being held captive by Grandmama Frump. Grandmama Frump finds Ophelia in her cell writing in blood "Wednesday Must Die".

== Production ==
=== Development ===
During pre-production on The Addams Family (1991), Tim Burton was approached to direct, but ended up passing on it due to scheduling conflicts with Batman (1989) and Batman Returns (1992), resulting in Barry Sonnenfeld taking the job. In March 2010, it was announced that Illumination Entertainment had acquired the underlying rights to the Addams Family drawings. The film was planned to be a stop-motion animated film based on Charles Addams's original drawings. Burton was set to co-write, co-produce and possibly direct the film. In July 2013, it was reported that the film was canceled, which, according to Burton, was due to the studio favoring a computer-animated approach over the stop-motion technique.

Showrunners Miles Millar and Alfred Gough started developing story ideas in 2019. They subsequently acquired the rights to the intellectual property before writing a television pilot script, which they sent to Burton. To their surprise, Burton immediately became interested upon receiving the script. Commenting about his decision to join the project, Burton stated that he could relate to the titular character's worldview and that the script "spoke to me about how I felt in school and how you feel about your parents, how you feel as a person. It gave the Addams Family a different kind of reality. It was an interesting combination". Feeling creatively drained after Dumbo (2019), Burton considered retiring from the industry, being left to his own "feelings and things" during the COVID-19 pandemic, but the offer to make Wednesday reconnected his love to filmmaking and served him as a "health camp". Millar stated that it was "very important" to the creative team not to emulate the prior films and 1964 television series. Millar and Gough decided to make the juxtaposition of "outcasts" and "normies", as well as criticism of colonial Americans, major themes in the series.

In October 2020, Wednesday was initially announced as an unnamed Addams Family project being helmed by Burton. The show's production would be handled by MGM Television, with Burton as director. Gough and Millar would serve as showrunners, while Gough, Millar and Burton would also be executive producers alongside Gail Berman, Jon Glickman and Andrew Mittman. In February 2021, Netflix gave the production a series order consisting of eight episodes. In August 2021, Kayla Alpert was added as an executive producer and 1.21, Tee and Charles Addams Foundation and Glickmania were also producing the series. Deemed his "first real foray into television", Burton directed four out of the eight episodes, with Gandja Monteiro and James Marshall directing the remaining episodes. Burton brought on regular collaborator Colleen Atwood as costume designer.

On possible future seasons, Gough and Millar commented in an interview with Variety, "when we sit down to create a show, it's looking at multiple seasons, ideally. That's never expected, but that's the anticipation that hopefully the show is successful." They further stated that they had "a pretty clear runway" of how future seasons could unfold. In an interview with The Hollywood Reporter, Gough and Millar stated that the second season would expand upon the friendship between Wednesday Addams and Enid Sinclair while also evolving Wednesday's relationship with her mother, Morticia. Ortega stated that the season would "lean into the horror aspect" while "ditching any romantic love interest for Wednesday". Preparations for a second season commenced in December 2022, following Amazon's acquisition of Metro-Goldwyn-Mayer. In January 2023, the series was renewed for a second season, with Ortega now also serving as producer. In July 2025, the series was renewed for a third season.

A spin-off series centered around Uncle Fester has been in early development on Netflix as of December 2023. As of August 2025, the creators were not treating it as a priority as they were focused instead on the production of the third season of Wednesday.

=== Casting ===
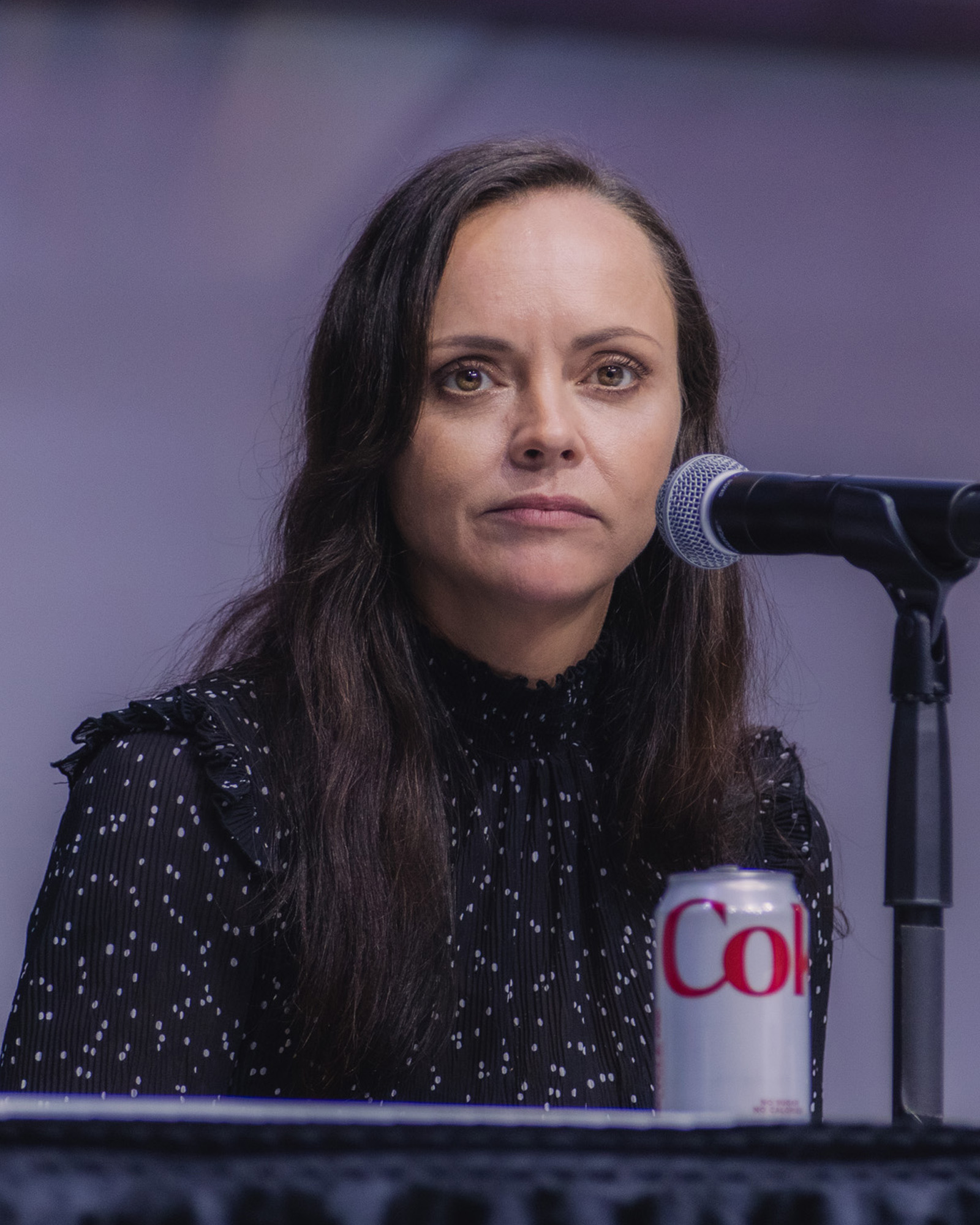
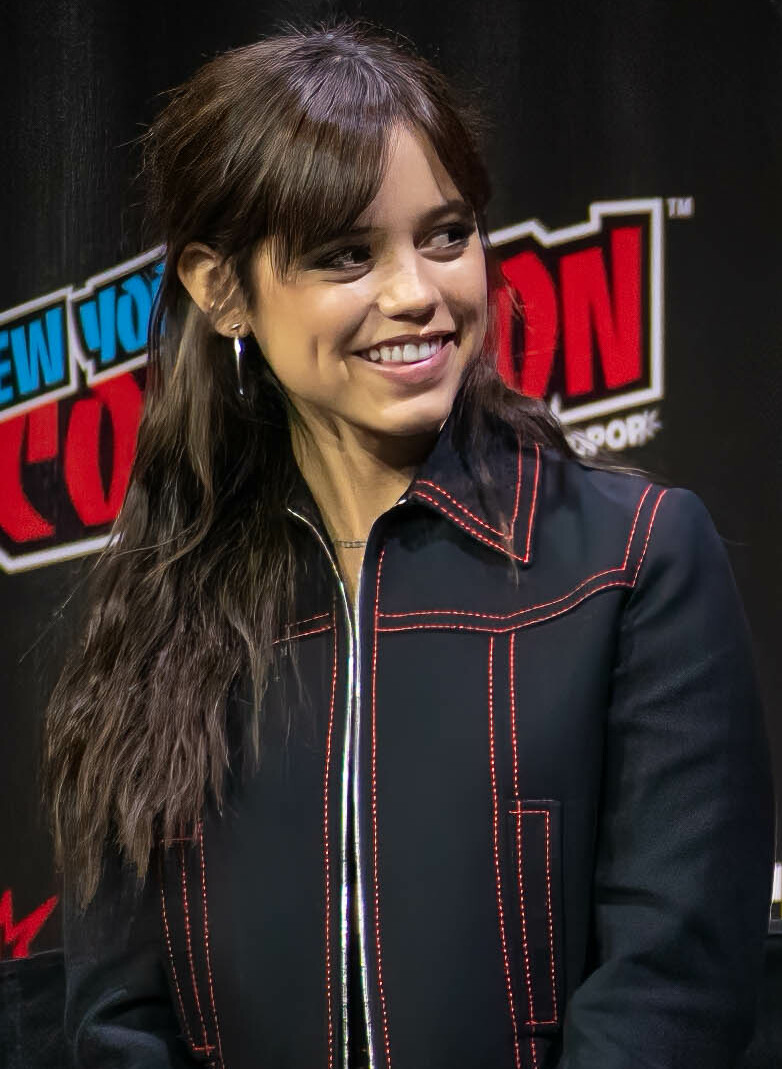
Christina Ricci (left) appears in the series as a nod to her previous portrayal of the titular character, this time played by Jenna Ortega (right).

The creative team sought a Latina to play the role of Wednesday Addams to align with character Gomez Addams's heritage, an aspect of the character that was already worked into the series' script. In May 2021, Jenna Ortega, who is of Mexican and Puerto Rican descent, was cast in the role. Millar stated that, upon their first Zoom call together, the creative team knew that "nobody else on this planet" was better suited to portray the character. Ortega said that she was initially hesitant about joining the project due to her past work in teen-oriented Disney Channel shows and her plans to prioritize film over television work, but decided to join in after meeting Burton through Zoom. In the beginning of August of that year, Luis Guzmán was cast to guest-star as Gomez Addams, and Catherine Zeta-Jones was cast as Morticia Addams in an undisclosed capacity. Later that month, Thora Birch, Riki Lindhome, Jamie McShane, Hunter Doohan, Georgie Farmer, Moosa Mostafa, Emma Myers, Naomi J. Ogawa, Joy Sunday, and Percy Hynes White were announced to be cast as series regulars. Myers initially auditioned for the titular role before she was cast as Wednesday's roommate Enid Sinclair.

In September, Gwendoline Christie and Victor Dorobantu were added to the cast in starring roles while Isaac Ordonez, George Burcea, Tommie Earl Jenkins, Iman Marson, William Houston, Luyanda Unati Lewis-Nyawo, Oliver Watson, Calum Ross and Johnna Dias Watson were cast in recurring roles. In December 2021, Birch left the series, leaving the status of her character, dorm mother Tamara Novak, unclear. In March 2022, it was announced that Christina Ricci, who played Wednesday Addams in the film The Addams Family and its sequel Addams Family Values (1993), was cast as a series regular, replacing Birch in a similar role. Commenting on her casting, Ricci stated, "I was really flattered to be asked and to be asked by Tim [Burton]", with whom she had previously collaborated on Sleepy Hollow (1999). Ricci was almost unable to accept the role due to possible scheduling conflicts with Showtime series Yellowjackets (2021–present). In October, a trailer revealed Fred Armisen to be portraying Uncle Fester and Ricci's role was confirmed as Marilyn Thornhill.

In April 2024, Steve Buscemi joined the cast of the second season as the new principal of Nevermore Academy, after previously working with Ortega in Klara and the Sun (2026) and with Burton in Big Fish (2003), alongside Thandiwe Newton in an undisclosed role. In May, the cast for the season was announced, with Buscemi portraying Barry Dort, Billie Piper as Isadora Capri, Joanna Lumley as Grandmama, Newton as Dr. Rachael Fairburn, alongside Evie Templeton, Owen Painter, Noah B. Taylor, Christopher Lloyd, Frances O'Connor, Haley Joel Osment, Heather Matarazzo and Joonas Suotamo in undisclosed roles, while Zeta-Jones, Guzmán, Ordonez and Lewis-Nyawo were promoted to the main cast. Lumley had previously worked with Burton in Corpse Bride (2005). In addition, it was announced that Percy Hynes White would not return for the second season, due to anonymous sexual assault allegations against the actor which surfaced on Twitter in January 2023, alongside Naomi J Ogawa, and Jamie McShane was set to appear on a guest capacity. In November, Lady Gaga was cast in an undisclosed role, later revealed to be the portrayal of Rosaline Rotwood in the second part of the second season.

In November 2025, Eva Green joined the cast as a series regular for the third season, having previously worked with Burton in Dark Shadows (2012), Miss Peregrine's Home for Peculiar Children (2016) and Dumbo, and will portray Morticia's sister Ophelia Frump. In February 2026, the cast for the third season was announced, with Winona Ryder portraying Tabitha, Chris Sarandon as Balthazar, Noah Taylor as Cyrus, Oscar Morgan as Atticus, and Kennedy Moyer as Daisy. Ryder had previously worked with Burton in Beetlejuice (1988), Edward Scissorhands (1990), Frankenweenie (2012), and Beetlejuice Beetlejuice (2024), while Sarandon had previously worked with Burton in The Nightmare Before Christmas (1993), and Taylor had previously worked with Burton in Charlie and the Chocolate Factory (2005). Additionally, Joanna Lumley was promoted to the main cast for the third season, while Noah B. Taylor was confirmed not to return. In April 2026, Lena Headey, Andrew McCarthy, and James Lance joined the cast as guest stars.

=== Filming ===
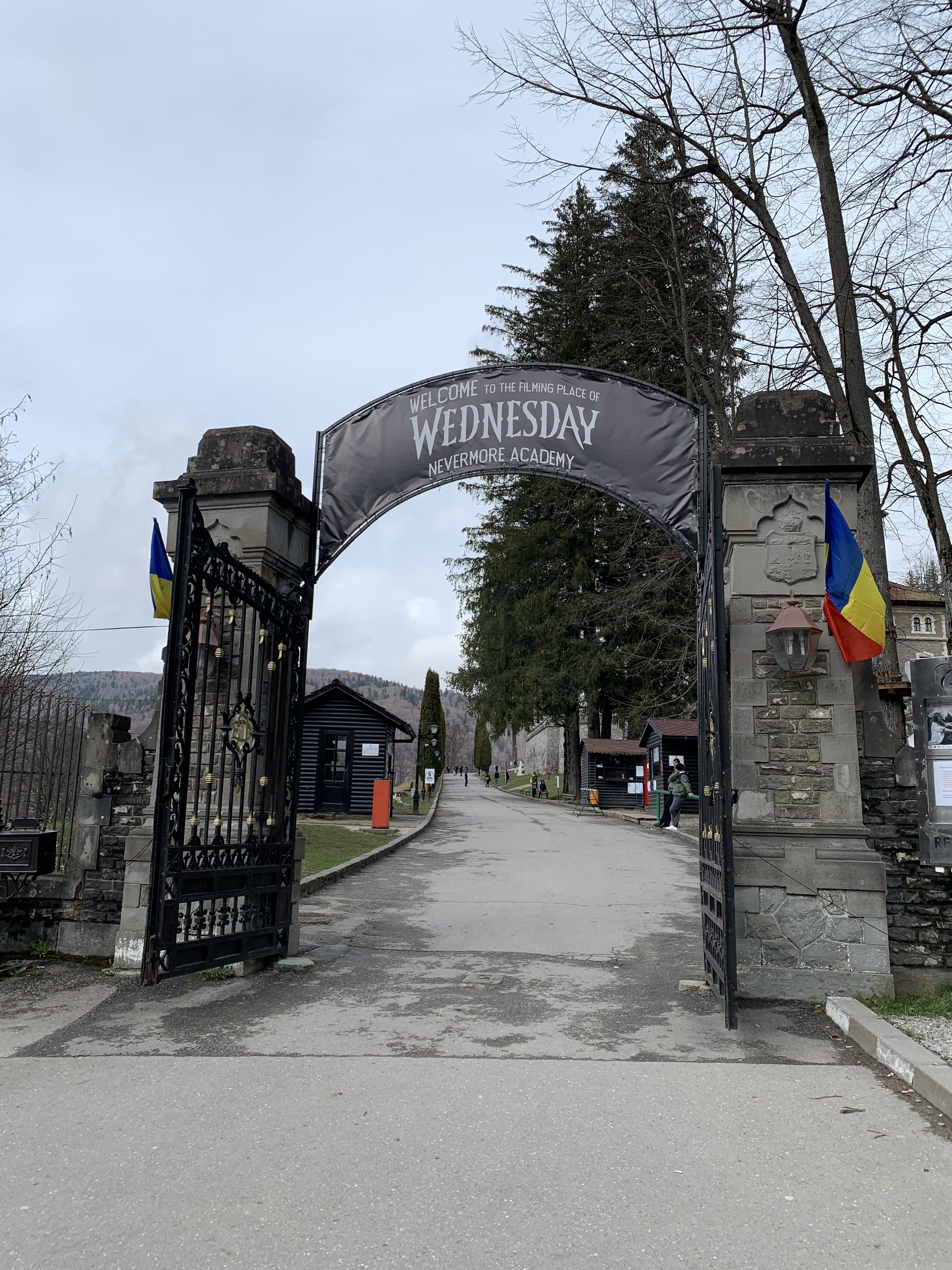
The entrance to Cantacuzino Castle as of April 2023 has been marketed as the shooting location of Nevermore Academy

Principal photography for the first season took place between September 2021 and March 2022 in the Southern Carpathian town of Bușteni, Romania. Filming locations included Cantacuzino Castle, serving as the setting for the fictional Nevermore Academy, Politehnica University of Bucharest, Sinaia railway station, the Bucharest Botanical Garden, Monteoru House and the historic Olga Greceanu Mansion in Dâmbovița County, standing in for the Gates mansion. Exterior shots of Cantacuzino Castle were supplemented with computer-generated imagery. Other settings, including the entire town of Jericho, were constructed at Buftea Studios. Production designer Mark Scruton based his set design primarily on Charles Addams's original cartoons and drew inspiration from Burton-directed films such as Beetlejuice and Charlie and the Chocolate Factory.

Ortega called her work on the series "very stressful and confusing" and "the most overwhelming job I've ever had" due to the production's fast-tracked shooting schedule. To prepare for her role, Ortega learned to play cello and took canoeing, fencing, archery and German lessons. According to actress Joy Sunday, the canoeing lessons were especially strenuous, involving the entire cast and some dozen stuntmen racing each other for an hour daily, with days starting as early as 5:30 am. Ortega avoided talking to Ricci about playing the character during filming to achieve her own unique rendition of the role. She choreographed her dance to the Cramps' "Goo Goo Muck" herself, taking inspiration from Siouxsie Sioux, Bob Fosse and goth dance club footage from the 1980s. Ortega filmed the dance while experiencing body aches and a sore throat; she received medicine between takes while awaiting a COVID-19 test result. MGM confirmed that she was removed from the set after testing positive. Ortega asked to reshoot the scene, but they did not have time. Ortega sought to make Wednesday's characterization consistent, down to changing lines that she felt were unfitting of the character and with more depth. She stated "you can't lead a story and have no emotional arc because then it's boring and nobody likes you." Scenes featuring Thing, played by Romanian magician Victor Dorobantu, were achieved using a mixture of practical and special effects; Dorobantu wore a blue chroma-key bodysuit that would be edited out in post-production, leaving only his hand exposed. To create the illusion of a severed hand, a prosthetic stump was applied to Dorobantu's hand.

The second season began filming on May 7, 2024 in Ireland. Ortega's schedule for the show was discussed with the filmmakers of the Scream franchise prior to the 2023 SAG-AFTRA strike, and it was reported that Ortega departed the then-upcoming Scream 7 (2026) due to scheduling conflicts with Wednesday. Ortega denied this report in April 2025, claiming she instead left because of the departures of Melissa Barrera, Matt Bettinelli-Olpin and Tyler Gillett from that project. By August 2024, they had completed four episodes. Filming wrapped on December 4, 2024. According to Tourism Ireland, some of the locations used to shoot the new series include Charleville Castle in Co Offaly, Dean's Grange Cemetery in Co Dublin and Ashford Studios in Co Wicklow.

The third season was reportedly scheduled to begin filming on November 30, 2025, in Ireland, however some outlets reported that it would not begin filming until the first quarter of 2026. Filming began on February 23, 2026. On April 20, 2026, a first look was released, featuring Ortega, Dorobantu and Fred Armisen filming in Paris. During filming in Dublin at the end of June, Green suffered an injury and had to be taken to the hospital, where she recovered later that week. Filming wrapped on September 30.

=== Music ===
In December 2021, it was reported that longtime Burton collaborator Danny Elfman joined the series to compose the original theme and co-compose its score with Chris Bacon. The score features a selection of the series's original score composed by Elfman and Bacon as well as several pop songs, including cello renditions of "Paint It Black" by the Rolling Stones, "Nothing Else Matters" by Metallica (covered by Apocalyptica) and "Physical" by Dua Lipa. The score also incorporates a number of classical works, including The Four Seasons by Antonio Vivaldi, Edward Elgar's Cello Concerto, The Carnival of the Animals by Camille Saint-Saëns, Gnossienne No. 1 by Erik Satie and "Flight of the Bumblebee" by Nikolai Rimsky-Korsakov.

Led by two singles, Wednesday's 48-track soundtrack was released by Lakeshore Records on November 23, 2022, and a four-track extended play featuring covers of classical and pop songs was released on November 30. In his review of the series, Tony Sokol of Den of Geek called the score "a major character, not only thematically, but as an emotional delivery system", making "the chills creepier, the jokes funnier and the tingles tangible". Linda Codega of Gizmodo called the cello segments "memorable" and the score "occasionally-magnificent". Writing for IGN, Amelia Emberwing described the combination of Elfman's score with Burton's material as "[going] together like peanut butter and jelly" and the score overall as "a stunner".

The second season continued to use a large number of popular hits mixed with classical compositions in the soundtrack. The soundtrack includes "My Favorite Things" by the Lennon Sisters, "Un Mundo Raro" by Chavela Vargas, "Tropical Island" by Barry Lipman Singers, "Kiss Me" by Sixpence None the Richer, "Um Oh Ah Yey" by Mamamoo, Prokofiev's Romeo and Juliet Op. 64, Act 1: Dance of the Knights, "No Time to Cry" by the Sisters of Mercy, "Nevermore Alma Mater" by Pitch Slaps, and "Dancing in the Dark" by Bruce Springsteen. Ortega was portrayed as performing Dance of the Knights on cello for an episode of season two. Lady Gaga released a new song for the second part of season two, titled "The Dead Dance", in September 2025 which was featured in the seventh episode.

== Release ==
Wednesday premiered on November 16, 2022, at Hollywood Legion Theater in Los Angeles. Its eight episodes were released on Netflix on November 23, 2022. In December 2022, Netflix released a promotional video to its Twitter account depicting Thing, a sentient disembodied hand appearing in the series, roaming the streets of New York City and capturing the reactions of passersby. The first season was released on Blu-ray and DVD by Warner Bros. Home Entertainment (via Studio Distribution Services joint-venture unit) in March 2024.

The second season released in two parts. The first part, consisting of four episodes, premiered on August 6, 2025, while the second part, also consisting of four episodes, premiered on September 3, 2025.

== Reception ==
=== Audience viewership ===
According to data from users of TV Time collected by Whip Media, Wednesday had the second-most pre-release followers of any Netflix original series on the platform, behind only The Witcher; it ultimately debuted at number one on Netflix in 83 countries. The series holds the record of most hours viewed in a week for an English-language Netflix series with a total 341 million hours watched in its first week of release, amounting to more than 50 million households, and passing prior record holder Stranger Things 4's 335 million hours. Nielsen Media Research reported a combined watch time of 6 billion minutes within its first week of release, making it the second-biggest streaming week ever recorded by the firm.

Variety, citing U.S. viewing-time data from research firm PlumResearch, reported that Netflix originals reached their highest monthly share of viewing in November 2022 — about 60 percent — following the release of Wednesday.

Three weeks after its release, it became the second-most watched English-language Netflix series in the history of the platform, reaching an estimated 150 million households and totaling 1 billion viewing hours by December 2022. Jacob Stolworthy of The Independent called the series's popularity "unprecedented" and suggested that it could jumpstart development of several other spin-off television series. International response to the series has been strong, with Column magazine reporting that "a separate record has already been set by the kickoff of the second Wednesday season. In 91 countries, the series sits at the top of the local charts for English-language series — including Germany and the United States. This has never before been achieved by any English-language Netflix series."

=== Critical response ===
Critical response of Wednesday
Season	Rotten Tomatoes	Metacritic
1	74% (102 reviews)	66 (26 reviews)
2	87% (97 reviews)	66 (31 reviews)

==== Season 1 ====
For the first season, the review aggregator website Rotten Tomatoes reported a 74% approval rating, based on 102 reviews. The website's critics consensus reads, "Wednesday isn't exactly full of woe for viewers, but without Jenna Ortega in the lead, this Addams Family-adjacent series might as well be another CW drama." Metacritic, which uses a weighted average, assigned a score of 66 out of 100 based on 26 critics, indicating "generally favorable".

Ed Power of The Daily Telegraph gave Wednesday four out of five stars and called it "an addictively rococo romp that unfolds like a cross between Euphoria and Hotel Transylvania". John Anderson of The Wall Street Journal commended Ortega's "charismatic performance" and called the series "often delightful, despite its deliberate darkness". In his "B"-review for The Detroit News, Tom Long deemed the series visually appealing and described Ortega's deadpan as "just as elastic as it needed to be" and her performance overall as "consistently [pushing] outside the caricature enough to keep things lively". Writing for RogerEbert.com, Cristina Escobar similarly praised Ortega's deadpan humor and commended the series' "satisfactory" ending. While finding that the series would not be "what real fans of Charles Addams and his characters are looking for", Mike Hale of The New York Times called the series "tolerable" despite "satisfying only on the level of formulaic teenage romance and mystery" and compared it to the Harry Potter franchise. Commenting on its tone, Jesse Hassenger of TheWrap described the four episodes directed by Burton as feeling more like Veronica Mars than Sleepy Hollow. Nick Hilton of The Independent gave the series two out of five stars and criticized the series's tone as "relentlessly quippy Gen Z" and its performances as "more two-dimensional than the New Yorker comic strip in which the characters first appeared".

==== Season 2 ====
For the second season, Rotten Tomatoes gave an 87% approval rating, based on 97 reviews. The website's critics consensus states, "Wednesday's second season smartly opens up to include more of the whole Addams clan, backing up Jenna Ortega's lovably heartless teenager with an ookier and spookier ensemble." On Metacritic, it has a weighted average score of 65 out of 100 based on 29 critics, indicating "generally favorable" reviews.

Lili Loofbourow of The Washington Post said Wednesday's second season is "tonally darker than its predecessors, and that sometimes feels like a drag on the show, especially when it veers away from the silly high school antics (such as the notorious dance sequence in Season 1). The spin-off suffers from some of the same conceptual instability that plagued the original films, but the latter, being comedies, managed their contradictions with hand-wavy humor."

The episode "Woe Thyself" was particularly well-received, with many calling it the standout of the season while praising the performances from Ortega and Myers. Alex Zalben of IGN deemed it "the best episode of the series, period," and "[the only episode that] manages to properly balance supernatural shenanigans and the overall plot while elevating the central relationship of the show to the forefront and actually giving Wednesday and Enid clear arcs where they learn things about themselves and each other. You know: a properly structured episode of television."

=== Queerbaiting allegations ===
Wednesday has been repeatedly accused of queerbaiting. Many fans have interpreted Wednesday's close friendship and moments of emotional intimacy with Enid Sinclair as suggestive of a romantic subtext; this popular ship has been dubbed "Wenclair". The show's writers have stated that the show is about the friendship between Wednesday and Enid, and there are no plans for a romantic relationship between the two characters.

=== Accolades ===
Accolades received by Wednesday
Award	Year	Category	Recipient(s)	Result	Ref.
AACTA International Awards	2023	Best Comedy Series	Wednesday	Nominated	
Art Directors Guild Awards	2023	Excellence in Production Design for a One-Hour Period or Fantasy Single-Camera Series	Mark Scruton (for "Woe Is the Loneliest Number")	Nominated	
Art Directors Guild Awards	2026	Excellence in Production Design for a One-Hour Period or Fantasy Single-Camera Series	Mark Scruton (for "If These Woes Could Talk")	Nominated	
Astra TV Awards	2023	Best Streaming Series, Comedy	Wednesday	Nominated	
Astra TV Awards	2023	Best Actress in a Streaming Series, Comedy	Jenna Ortega	Nominated	
Astra TV Awards	2023	Best Supporting Actress in a Streaming Series, Comedy	Christina Ricci	Won (Note: Tied with Ayo Edebiri for The Bear.)	
Astra TV Awards	2023	Best Directing in a Streaming Series, Comedy	Tim Burton (for "Wednesday's Child Is Full of Woe")	Nominated	
Astra TV Awards	2023	Best Writing in a Streaming Series, Comedy	Alfred Gough and Miles Millar (for "Wednesday's Child Is Full of Woe")	Nominated	
Astra TV Awards	2025	Best Actress in a Comedy Series	Jenna Ortega	Nominated	
Astra TV Awards	2025	Best Supporting Actress in a Comedy Series	Emma Myers	Nominated	
Astra TV Awards	2025	Best Guest Actress in a Comedy Series	Christina Ricci	Won	
Astra TV Awards	2025	Best Directing in a Comedy Series	Wednesday	Nominated	
Astra Creative Arts Awards	2023	Best Guest Actress in a Comedy Series	Catherine Zeta-Jones	Nominated	
Astra Creative Arts Awards	2023	Best Fantasy or Science Fiction Costumes	Wednesday	Won	
Astra Creative Arts Awards	2023	Best Main Title Design	Wednesday	Nominated	
Astra Creative Arts Awards	2025	Best Choreography	Corey Baker	Won	
Astra Creative Arts Awards	2025	Best Cinematography	Wednesday	Nominated	
Astra Creative Arts Awards	2025	Best Costume Design	Colleen Atwood	Won	
Astra Creative Arts Awards	2025	Best Makeup	Wednesday	Nominated	
Astra Creative Arts Awards	2025	Best Production Design	Wednesday	Nominated	
Astra Creative Arts Awards	2025	Best Score	Wednesday	Nominated	
Astra Creative Arts Awards	2025	Best Visual Effects	Wednesday	Nominated	
British Academy Television Awards	2023	Best International Programme	Wednesday	Nominated	
British Academy Television Craft Awards	2023	Best Make Up and Hair Design	Tara McDonald	Nominated	
Critics' Choice Super Awards	2023	Best Horror Series	Wednesday	Won	
Critics' Choice Super Awards	2023	Best Actress in a Horror Series	Jenna Ortega	Won	
Critics' Choice Super Awards	2023	Best Actress in a Horror Series	Christina Ricci	Nominated	
Costume Designers Guild Awards	2023	Excellence in Contemporary Television	Colleen Atwood and Mark Sutherland (for "Wednesday's Child Is Full of Woe")	Won	
Costume Designers Guild Awards	2026	Excellence in Contemporary Television	Colleen Atwood and Mark Sutherland (for "Woe Me the Money")	Nominated	
Directors Guild of America Awards	2023	Outstanding Directorial Achievement in Comedy Series	Tim Burton (for "Wednesday's Child Is Full of Woe")	Nominated	
Golden Globe Awards	2023	Best Television Series – Musical or Comedy	Wednesday	Nominated	
Golden Globe Awards	2023	Best Actress – Television Series Musical or Comedy	Jenna Ortega	Nominated	
Golden Globe Awards	2026	Best Actress – Television Series Musical or Comedy	Jenna Ortega	Nominated	
Golden Reel Awards	2023	Outstanding Achievement in Music Editing – Broadcast Long Form	Michael T. Ryan (for "A Murder of Woes")	Nominated	
Golden Trailer Awards	2023	Best Fantasy Adventure for a TV/Streaming Series (Trailer/Teaser/TV Spot)	"Nero" (Trailer Park, Inc.)	Won	
Hollywood Music in Media Awards	2022	Best Main Title Theme – TV Show/Limited Series	Danny Elfman	Nominated	
Hollywood Music in Media Awards	2025	Original Score – TV Show/Limited Series	Chris Bacon	Nominated	
Hollywood Music in Media Awards	2025	Original Song – TV Show/Limited Series	"The Dead Dance" – Lady Gaga and Andrew Watt	Won	
Hollywood Music in Media Awards	2025	Music Supervision – Television	Jen Malone and Nicole Weisberg	Nominated	
iHeartRadio Music Awards	2026	Favorite On Screen	Lady Gaga in Wednesday	Nominated	
Make-Up Artists & Hair Stylists Guild Awards	2023	Best Period and/or Character Make-Up	Tara McDonald, Nirvana Jalalvand, Gabriela Cretan	Nominated	
Make-Up Artists & Hair Stylists Guild Awards	2026	Best Period and/or Character Make-Up	Lynn Johnston, Elaine Hopkins, Dorothy Campbell, Helen Bailey, Nirvana Jalalvand	Nominated	
Make-Up Artists & Hair Stylists Guild Awards	2026	Best Period and/or Character Hair Styling	Francesco Pegoretti, Nirvana Jalalvand	Nominated	
Make-Up Artists & Hair Stylists Guild Awards	2026	Best Special Make-Up Effects	Tristan Versluis, Matthew Smith	Nominated	
MTV Millennial Awards	2023	Killer Series / Movie	Wednesday	Nominated	
MTV Movie & TV Awards	2023	Best Show	Wednesday	Nominated	
MTV Movie & TV Awards	2023	Best Performance in a Show	Jenna Ortega	Won	
MTV Movie & TV Awards	2023	Best Hero	Jenna Ortega	Nominated	
MTV Movie & TV Awards	2023	Best Duo	Jenna Ortega and Thing	Nominated	
MTV Movie & TV Awards	2023	Best Musical Moment	"Goo Goo Muck"	Nominated	
National Television Awards	2023	New Drama	Wednesday	Won	
Nickelodeon Kids' Choice Awards	2023	Favorite Family TV Show	Wednesday	Won	
Nickelodeon Kids' Choice Awards	2023	Favorite Female TV Star (Family)	Jenna Ortega	Won	
Nickelodeon Kids' Choice Awards	2026	Favorite Family TV Show	Wednesday	Nominated	
Nickelodeon Kids' Choice Awards	2026	Favorite Female TV Star (Family)	Catherine Zeta-Jones	Nominated	
Nickelodeon Kids' Choice Awards	2026	Favorite Female TV Star (Family)	Emma Myers	Nominated	
Nickelodeon Kids' Choice Awards	2026	Favorite Female TV Star (Family)	Jenna Ortega	Won	
Nickelodeon Kids' Choice Awards	2026	Favorite Male TV Star (Family)	Isaac Ordonez	Nominated	
Nickelodeon Kids' Choice Awards	2026	Favorite On-Screen Duo/Trio	Jenna Ortega and Emma Myers	Nominated	
Primetime Creative Arts Emmy Awards	2023	Outstanding Main Title Design	Aaron Becker, Joseph Ahn, James Ramirez, Lee Nelson, Eric Keller and Hsien Lun Su	Nominated	
Primetime Creative Arts Emmy Awards	2023	Outstanding Original Main Title Theme Music	Danny Elfman	Won	
Primetime Creative Arts Emmy Awards	2023	Outstanding Contemporary Makeup (Non-Prosthetic)	Tara McDonald, Freda Ellis, Nirvana Jalalvand, Tamara Meade, and Bianca Boeroiu (for "Woe What a Night")	Won	
Primetime Creative Arts Emmy Awards	2023	Outstanding Music Composition for a Series (Original Dramatic Score)	Danny Elfman and Chris Bacon (for "Woe Is the Loneliest Number")	Nominated	
Primetime Creative Arts Emmy Awards	2023	Outstanding Contemporary Costumes for a Series	Colleen Atwood, Mark Sutherland, Robin Soutar, Claudia Littlefield and Adina Bucur (for "Wednesday's Child Is Full of Woe")	Won	
Primetime Creative Arts Emmy Awards	2023	Outstanding Cinematography for a Series (One Hour)	David Lanzenberg (for "Woe What a Night")	Nominated	
Primetime Creative Arts Emmy Awards	2023	Outstanding Production Design for a Narrative Contemporary Program (One Hour or More)	Mark Scruton, Adrian Curelea, and Robert Hepburn (for "Wednesday's Child Is Full of Woe")	Won	
Primetime Creative Arts Emmy Awards	2023	Outstanding Stunt Coordination for a Comedy Series Or Variety Program	Brett Chan and Jason Ng	Nominated	
Primetime Creative Arts Emmy Awards	2023	Outstanding Special Visual Effects in a Single Episode	Tom Turnbull, Kent Johnson, Jesse Kawzenuk, Oana Bardan, Craig Calvert, Ed Englander, John Coldrick, Brodie McNeill, and Jason Troughton (for "A Murder of Woes")	Nominated	
Primetime Creative Arts Emmy Awards	2026	Outstanding Choreography for Scripted Programming	Corey Baker (for "The Dead Dance")	Nominated	
Primetime Creative Arts Emmy Awards	2026	Outstanding Contemporary Hairstyling	Francesco Pegoretti, Sevlene Roddy, Marica Falso, Peter Burke and Nirvana Jalalvand (for "Woe Me the Money")	Nominated	
Primetime Creative Arts Emmy Awards	2026	Outstanding Contemporary Makeup (Non-Prosthetic)	Lynn Johnston, Helen Bailey, Elaine Hopkins and Dorothy Campbell (for "Woe Me the Money")	Nominated	
Primetime Creative Arts Emmy Awards	2026	Outstanding Contemporary Costumes for a Series	Colleen Atwood, Tom Hornsby, Connor Dalton, Mark Sutherland, Robin Soutar and Charlotte Child (for "Woe Me the Money")	Nominated	
Primetime Creative Arts Emmy Awards	2026	Outstanding Production Design for a Narrative Contemporary Program (One Hour or More)	Mark Scruton, Shane McEnroe and David Morison (for "If These Woes Could Talk")	Nominated	
Primetime Creative Arts Emmy Awards	2026	Outstanding Original Music and Lyrics	"The Dead Dance" by Lady Gaga, Andrew Watt and Henry Walter Russell (for "Woe Me the Money")	Nominated	
Primetime Emmy Awards	2023	Outstanding Comedy Series	Alfred Gough, Miles Millar, Tim Burton, Andrew Mittman, Gail Berman, Steve Stark, Kayla Alpert, Jonathan Glickman, Tommy Harper, Kevin Lafferty, Kevin Miserocchi, Todd Williams, Carla González Vargas, David Minkowski, Carmen Pepelea	Nominated	
Primetime Emmy Awards	2023	Outstanding Lead Actress in a Comedy Series	Jenna Ortega	Nominated	
Primetime Emmy Awards	2023	Outstanding Directing for a Comedy Series	Tim Burton (for "Wednesday's Child Is Full of Woe")	Nominated	
Saturn Awards	2024	Best Fantasy Television Series	Wednesday	Won	
Saturn Awards	2024	Best New Genre Television Series	Wednesday	Nominated	
Saturn Awards	2024	Best Performance by a Younger Actor on Television	Jenna Ortega	Won	
Saturn Awards	2024	Best Guest Star in a Television Series	Catherine Zeta-Jones	Nominated	
Saturn Awards	2026	Best Fantasy Television Series	Wednesday	Nominated	
Saturn Awards	2026	Best Actress in a Television Series	Jenna Ortega	Nominated	
Screen Actors Guild Awards	2023	Outstanding Performance by a Female Actor in a Comedy Series	Jenna Ortega	Nominated	
Screen Actors Guild Awards	2026	Outstanding Performance by a Female Actor in a Comedy Series	Jenna Ortega	Nominated	

== In popular culture ==
Following the release of Wednesday, Wednesday Addams' dance from the series and its fan recreations to Lady Gaga's song "Bloody Mary" went viral on video sharing service TikTok, with Kim Kardashian, Amelia Dimoldenberg, Marina Diamandis, Madonna and Gaga herself also participating in the trend. This resulted in a large increase in plays of the song on Spotify and on-demand streams in the United States, surging by 415 percent in the week after the series's release. Russian figure skater Kamila Valieva recreated the dance during a December 2022 competition. Earlier that same month, "Bloody Mary" was sent to French radio as a single, 11 years after the release of Born This Way, the album it was featured on. The 1981 song "Goo Goo Muck" by the Cramps, which plays during the original dance scene, also saw a surge in popularity. According to Billboard, on-demand streams of the song in the United States increased from 2,500 to over 134,000, and Spotify streams increased by 9,500 percent since the series was released. Janelle Zara of The Guardian stated that the viral dance trend "may have single-handedly revived Gothic subculture for Gen Z".
