= Isaac Ordonez =

American actor

- Ordonez at Dragon Con in 2026
- Born: April 15, 2009 (age 17); Los Angeles, California, U.S.
- Occupation: Actor
- Years active: 2018–present

Isaac Ordonez is an American actor. He is best known for playing Pugsley Addams in the Netflix series Wednesday.

== Early life ==
His father is of Colombian origin, while his mother is from Belize. Growing up in a multicultural household, Ordonez has often credited his diverse background as an important influence on his upbringing.

He receives his education through homeschooling.

== Career ==
Ordonez began his acting career as a stand-in for the character Charles Wallace in Disney’s 2018 film A Wrinkle in Time. Prior to that, he appeared in several short films, including Día de las Carpas, Psycho Sally, Dispara y Mata, and Husky.

Ordonez landed his breakthrough role in 2022 when he was cast in a recurring role as Pugsley Addams in Netflix comedy horror series Wednesday alongside Jenna Ortega. Ordonez is a series regular in Season 2 which premiered in August 2025.

== Filmography ==
=== Film ===
Year	Title	Role	Notes
2021	7th & union	Mario's Friend	

=== Television ===
Year	Title	Role	Notes
2022–present	Wednesday	Pugsley Addams	2 episodes (season one); Main role (season two)

=== Other works ===
Year	Title	Role	Notes
2011	Husky	Bryan	Short film
2018	Must've been	Young Dave	Music videoclip
2019	Día De las Carpas	Hector	YouTube awarded short film
2019	Jude	Mateo	Short film
2020	Psycho Sally	Diego	Comedy short film
2020	Dispara y Mata	son	Short film

== Awards and nominations ==
Year	Award	Category	Work	Result
2026	Kids' Choice Awards	Favorite Male TV Star (Family)	Wednesday	Pending
