= Wednesday Addams (Wednesday) =

- Wednesday character
- Jenna Ortega as Wednesday Addams
- First appearance: "Wednesday's Child is Full of Woe"; November 23, 2022
- Based on: Wednesday Addams by: Charles Addams; Paul Rudnick (Note: Gough and Millar explained in an essay to the Los Angeles Times: "The show owes a debt to the illustrious writer Paul Rudnick, who worked on the 1990s movies and perfected Wednesday's deliciously dark verbal wit, and Christina Ricci, whose meme-worthy performance elevated the role to iconic status."); Christina Ricci
- Adapted by: Alfred Gough; Miles Millar
- Portrayed by: Jenna Ortega; Emma Myers ("Woe Thyself"); Karina Varadi (young, season 1); Emily Ring (young, season 2); Jenny Ayumi (stunt double, seasons 1–3)

In-universe information
- Occupation: Student; Author; Detective; Vigilante
- Family: The Addams Family
- Home: New Jersey (Note: The Addams Family's car is shown to have a New Jersey license plate in the series premiere, and Gough and Millar have confirmed that their Wednesday grew up in New Jersey.); Nevermore Academy
- Outcast type: Raven psychic
- Age: 15–16 (first season) (Note: Wednesday is described as fifteen years old in the series's pilot script, and she celebrates her sixteenth birthday in the first season's sixth episode.); 16–17 (second season)

Wednesday Addams is the title character and protagonist of the Netflix television series Wednesday. Based on the character of the same name by Charles Addams, she is portrayed by Jenna Ortega. A psychic student at Nevermore Academy, Wednesday uses her powers to investigate murders and prevent foreseen deaths. Wednesday's macabre, antisocial personality hides her humanity and emotional growth, which eventually allow her to form connections. The character has also been briefly portrayed by several other actresses in the series, most notably Emma Myers (during an episode in which Wednesday and Enid swap bodies).

Like they had done with Clark Kent in Smallville, writers Alfred Gough and Miles Millar sought to explore and humanize an iconic character, envisioning Wednesday as a character study of the Addams Family's most popular member. Despite crafting their version of the character as a direct continuation of her 1991 and 1993 depictions, the series creators gave her several differentiations, including emotional complexity, the casting of a Latina actress, her age, and her appearance. Ortega exercised creative influence over the character, eventually becoming a producer.

This iteration of Wednesday Addams has been called "media's first female Latinx detective" as well as "an icon in her own right". Several journalists have considered her the best version of the character, while Digital Spy has ranked her among the greatest female television characters of the 21st century. However, several aspects of her adaptation have been criticized. Ortega's performance has received critical acclaim, while the role elevated her to greater fame. A subject of analysis, the character has been considered "among the very first intersectional portrayals of an autistic-coded person in media".

== Concept and creation ==
=== Background ===
The character that would eventually become known as Wednesday Addams was introduced in June 1940 in a single-panel comic created by American cartoonist Charles Addams. (Note: According to Literary Hub: "Although there is disagreement about which Wednesday is truly the first, [the] Tee and Charles Addams Foundation identifies a 1940 jump-rope comic as the first appearance of Wednesday." This comic was published in June 1940, according to Game Rant.) In 1944, the unnamed, young girl joined the rest of her "satirical and often quite macabre" family in her official debut in The New Yorker. The girl was characterized by her black dress, Peter Pan collar, pigtails, melancholy, and macabre nature, though the latter was the least noticeable of the family.

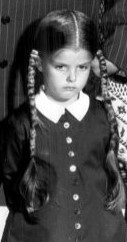
Lisa Loring as Wednesday Addams in 1964

In 1962, for a licensed doll collection, the girl was one of the first members of her family to receive a name, Wednesday, inspired by a line from the nursery rhyme "Monday's Child". In 1964, Addams's comics were adapted into television, with the series The Addams Family. As its name suggests, the series gave the family its creator's surname, giving Wednesday her full name. Wednesday Addams, portrayed by Lisa Loring, was adapted into a normal child who contrasted with the rest of her family. A short-lived 1973 animated series also kept Wednesday's more normal disposition.

The character was changed drastically for the 1991 feature film, turning her into a "true goth icon". Wednesday, now portrayed by Christina Ricci, was adapted into a preadolescent, sarcastic, cold, homicidal character. In the 1993 sequel, Wednesday showed her potential as a main character for the first time, leading the film's subplot. The 1990s films revived interest in the Addams Family and Wednesday in particular, making her largely the franchise's main character moving forward. Wednesday's personality in these films was kept in most future installments.

=== Adaptation ===
In 2018, Smallville writers Alfred Gough and Miles Millar wanted to create a similar series, seeking a character like Clark Kent with a life phase not yet depicted. Inspired by their love for the character, the character's lack of screen time and depth, "the Stephen King element of small towns and teenage emotions run rampant", their parenthood of teenage daughters, and the idea of making a positive teen girl role model, they chose to explore and center a teenage Wednesday Addams. Once again humanizing a one-note, iconic character with emotional complexity, they envisioned the series as a character study. Wanting to remove her from her family and create a situation in which a "girl who has never had to make friends before" finds a new family, they placed her in a boarding school. The creators gave her a character arc, evolving her capacity for human connection by "[moving] that dial one notch". Originally wanting to make a prequel series for Miss Marple, Gough and Millar were influenced by this and other detective fiction such as Murder, She Wrote when designing Wednesday, making her a detective and crime writer. Considering their Wednesday a direct continuation of her 1990s iteration, they were cautious against changing the character too much.

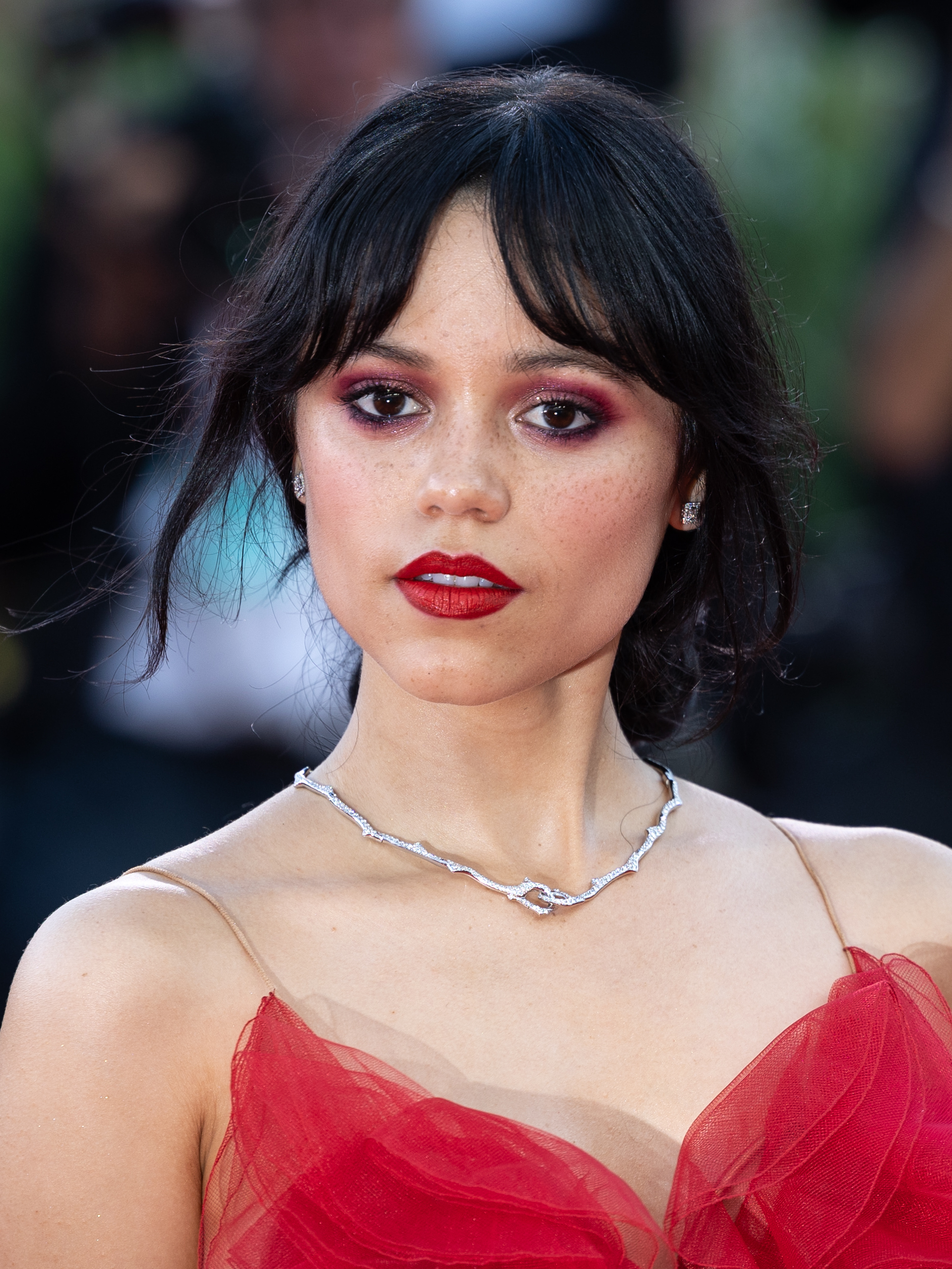
Jenna Ortega portrays Wednesday Addams

Gough, Millar, and director Tim Burton agreed that finding the right actress to play Wednesday was "the make-or-break of the show". They sought a Latina actress in honor of Gomez Addams's heritage. Auditioning hundreds of actresses, the creators considered Jenna Ortega perfect for the role immediately due to her appearance, attitude, intelligence, intensity, and dry sense of humor, casting her as Wednesday's title character in May 2021.

There was "supportive [collaboration]" regarding the character's development but also "a lot of battles". After casting Ortega, Gough and Millar gave her the scripts to receive her feedback and had many conversations with her regarding the character. Considering Wednesday's characterization nonsensical, Ortega became protective of her. Despite unsuccessfully negotiating for a producer role, Ortega still assumed some authorship over her character, later considering many of her conversations on set to have been like producing. Ortega considered it important for her character to have an emotional arc but also did not want her to be "any other teenage girl". She changed and cut many of her lines. Episode directors each had their own visions for the character, with which Ortega sometimes disagreed.

Ortega considered it very important to have a different portrayal of the character. She gave the character more social awkwardness and a more concealed confidence. Burton and Ortega established the character's expression very early, namely her lack of blinking (common in Burton's previous films), Kubrick stare, relaxed face, and use of eyebrows for reaction. Balancing the Addams Family's theatricality with an expressionless character, Ortega used silent film-esque mannerisms. Wanting Wednesday to be "specific, certain, and assertive" in her physicality, Ortega kept a straight posture and did not move her hands or arms much unless necessary. Interpreting the character as formal, Ortega altered her vocal pitch and pronunciations. However, to highlight the character's humanity, this was dropped in more dramatic scenes. To bring back Wednesday's innocence, Ortega sometimes portrayed her character's disagreements or inconsideration as misunderstanding rather than malice. The creators tried different versions of each take, varying the character's expression, vocal inflection, etc. (Note: Sources:)

While not straying too far from Wednesday's established black-and-white look, Colleen Atwood's costume team nonetheless sought to modernize her wardrobe. They introduced Wednesday in her vintage dress as a tribute to past works and to establish her as an outsider in a contemporary world, but her transfer to Nevermore Academy "[opened the floodgates] for creativity". Her casual looks were made to remain faithful to the character while also making her more relatable, with Atwood commenting that she "wanted Wednesday to be a person that, like the other kids, went out and did things". Burton wanted Wednesday to look like an "everyday version of a goth girl"; hair and makeup designer Tara McDonald interpreted the character as not obsessed with makeup, trying to "make her look iconic with as little makeup as possible". Burton also considered it important that the character look different from previous iterations, approving the bangs suggested by Ortega.

=== Changes after Season 1 ===
Emma Myers briefly portrays Wednesday in the second season

For the second season Ortega took on the additional role of producer, which made her feel "more empowered to speak [her] mind". Subsequently, the idea of Wednesday having a romantic interest was abandoned, after Ortega had previously criticized the first season's love triangle. Seeking to give Wednesday obstacles and a weakness, Gough and Millar made her relationships "treacherous" and took away her psychic ability. To explore the characters' social perceptions and highlight their specific cadences, Gough and Millar created an episode in which Wednesday swaps bodies with her roommate, Enid. Although Enid's actress, Emma Myers, had previously auditioned for the role of Wednesday, she did not use that experience when playing Wednesday and instead based her performance on Ortega, memorizing her costar's body language.

== Fictional biography ==
=== Background ===
Wednesday Addams grew up in a wealthy, eccentric New Jersey family. One day, when Wednesday was six years old, bullies ambushed her and killed her pet scorpion Nero in front of her. After burying and grieving her pet, Wednesday vowed to never cry again, assessing that her tears did not fix anything. Despite having perfect grades, her education was troubled; from ages ten to fifteen, she attended eight schools, ending with her current one, Nancy Reagan High School. An aspiring author, she wrote multiple mature, unpublished novels centered on the teen girl detective Viper de la Muerte, whom a therapist will later imply to be Wednesday's self-insert. At roughly age fourteen, (Note: Wednesday, still aged fifteen, tells Xavier in "Friend or Woe" that her psychic visions began "about a year ago".) she began having psychic visions but refused to tell her family.

=== Season 1 ===
Wednesday is expelled from Nancy Reagan High School after mutilating her brother Pugsley's bully with piranhas. She transfers to her parents' alma mater, Nevermore Academy, a boarding school for "outcasts", outside Jericho, Vermont. (Note: Burton has confirmed that the series is set in Vermont. Jericho is a fictional town, not to be confused with the real-life Jericho, Vermont.) Wednesday meets and forms tense or uncertain relationships with several people at her new school, including Principal Weems, werewolf roommate Enid Sinclair, and housemaster Marilyn Thornhill, as well as town resident Tyler Galpin. She also uncovers her spy, a sentient disembodied hand named Thing, and secures his allegiance. While attempting to escape from the school, Wednesday is nearly murdered by a classmate, who cites a prophecy that Wednesday will destroy Nevermore. To prevent her greatest fear of being responsible for something terrible, Wednesday decides to remain at the school to investigate the local murders and prophecy.

While doing so, she helps prove her father's innocence of murder, learns she is a type of dark psychic known as a Raven, grows romantically closer to Tyler, and admits to Enid that she is evolving as a person. Her uncle Fester informs her that the monster that she is looking for is a "Hyde", an enslaved person who can become a murderous monster at the whims of their master. Tyler and Thornhill are revealed as the Hyde and his master, respectively. Thornhill murders Weems and uses Wednesday to resurrect the genocidal colonist Joseph Crackstone to fulfill the prophecy of Nevermore's destruction. Thornhill, Tyler, and Crackstone are defeated by Wednesday and her allies. Having avoided emotional intimacy with her classmates until now, Wednesday shares a hug with Enid. While going home for the summer, Wednesday receives a threatening text message from an unknown stalker.

=== Season 2 ===
Wednesday spends her summer mastering her psychic ability, using it to apprehend a serial killer. Willingly returning to a school for the first time, she receives a hero's welcome to Nevermore, much to her annoyance. Wednesday reunites with Enid, who she now admits to considering a friend, but sees a premonition that she will be responsible for Enid's death. Wednesday begins an effort to save her roommate's life but loses her psychic ability. Enid is kidnapped and nearly killed by Wednesday's stalker from last year, Agnes DeMille, who begins assisting Wednesday's investigation. Wednesday's investigation leads her to a local asylum, where she accidentally frees Tyler, who defenestrates her and places her in a coma.

Wednesday is awakened from her coma by her new spirit guide, Weems. With the help of allies, Wednesday attempts to bring a threatening Tyler under her control, but the plan fails. Weems informs Wednesday that tension with her mother caused the loss of her psychic ability. A supernatural accident during Wednesday's investigation causes her to swap bodies with Enid; the two come into further conflict with Tyler's family but are able to return to their bodies. The premonition of Enid's death is resolved but replaced with a new premonition of an unknown Addams's death. Seeking to prevent this, Wednesday hunts Tyler's family. Enid tells Wednesday that, as an "alpha" werewolf, a full-moon transformation will likely turn her into a werewolf permanently and make her a target. Wednesday agrees to rescue her if this occurs. After Wednesday helps defeat the nefarious school principal, Pugsley is kidnapped by Tyler's uncle Isaac. While attempting to save her brother, Wednesday is buried alive by Isaac. Enid unearths her after transforming under a full moon. Enid flees. The Addams Family rescues Pugsley and defeats Isaac. After connecting with her mother and beginning a journey to rescue Enid, Wednesday regains her psychic ability, seeing a vision of her missing aunt Ophelia.

== Reception and impact ==
=== Cultural impact ===
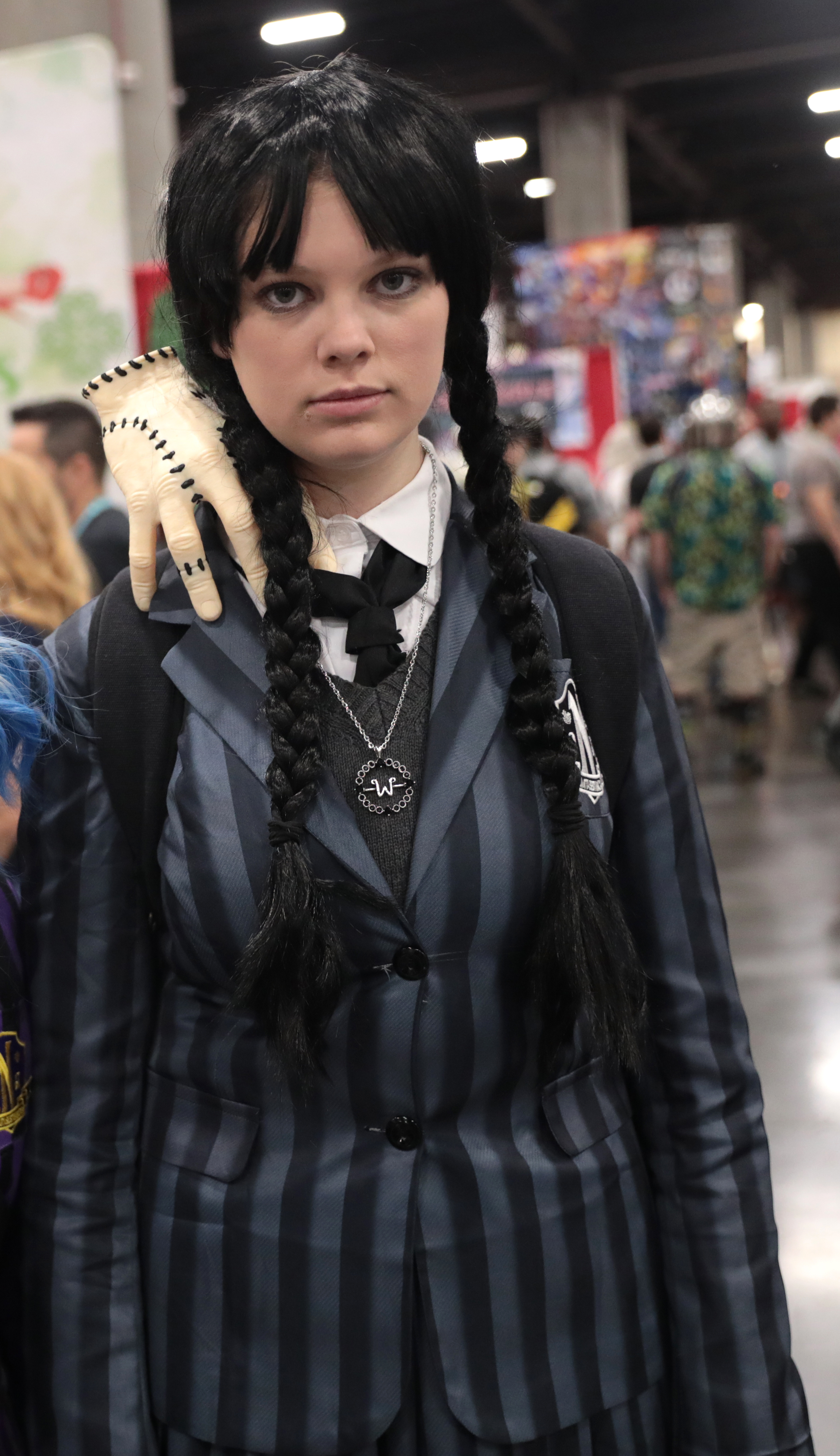
Cosplay of the character in 2023

CBR's Diane Darcy has written that "it's undeniable Ortega's Wednesday has become an icon in her own right". L'Officiel has written that "[Ortega's] Wednesday became not just a character, but a cultural phenomenon, a style icon, and a symbol of the new gothic renaissance". This iteration of Wednesday Addams has been considered an inspiration or the poster girl for several aesthetics, including a goth revival, dark academia, and tired girl. (Note: Sources for: Goth revival: The Telegraph's Laura Craik has written that the "stylishly sulky anti-hero played by Jenna Ortega in the Addams family reboot has ignited a fashion and pop culture phenomenon (a goth revival)."; Dark academia: The Guardian's Chloe Mac Donnell has written that "Wednesday, who shuns technology for a typewriter, carries a satchel stuffed with books and holds seances, is the perfect poster girl for the [dark academia] movement".; Tired girl: CNA's Vanessa Chia has written that "Jenna Ortega's Wednesday Addams is the poster girl [of the "tired girl aesthetics" trend].".) Game Rant's Alice Dodds has written that "the recent Wednesday has become a champion for the queer community". Wednesday's dance became "a cultural phenomenon in its own right"; The Guardian's Janelle Zara has stated that the dance "may have single-handedly revived Gothic subculture for Gen Z".

=== Commendation ===
According to a TV Time viewer poll, Wednesday was the most popular television character of 2022. Inverse's Dais Johnston called her "one of the most captivating characters of the year". Several journalists have considered her the best version of Wednesday Addams. (Note: Including Digital Spy's Janet Leigh, Collider's Rachel Salveta, Branyan Towe of Loud and Clear Reviews, Fresh Air's David Bianculli, Collider's Marco Oddo, and Screen Rant's Angel Shaw. CBC's Jackson Weaver has similarly remarked that "Ortega has likely become the definitive Wednesday".) Digital Spy's Janet Leigh has praised the character's depth, believing that it makes her more interesting than her previous iterations. HuffPost's Ian Kumamoto has praised the unexaggerated nuance of Wednesday's Latina identity. Some of the character's relationships have been received positively; Wednesday and Thing were nominated for the 2023 MTV Movie Award for Best On-Screen Duo, while multiple journalists have considered Wednesday and Enid among the best friendships in television. Wednesday has been ranked as one of the greatest Netflix characters of all time. (Note: Ranked as such by Collider's David Caballero and Fortress of Solitude's Tito Pernalete. Additionally, Screen Rant's Ben Sherlock indicated that he would've ranked Wednesday as such if not for her being a non-original character.) Although Wednesday did not make her top-12 list, Collider's Christine Persaud mentioned the character when discussing the greatest television characters of the 2020s, while Digital Spy has ranked her as the 46th greatest female television character of the 21st century.

Jenna Ortega's performance as Wednesday has received critical acclaim. She has received several honors for the role, including two Golden Globe Award nominations for Best Actress – Television Series Musical or Comedy and an Emmy Award nomination for Outstanding Lead Actress in a Comedy Series. Praising Ortega's performance as "absolutely magnetic", Game Rant's Crystal Martin has written that "nobody could've showcased Wednesday's morbid humor and emotional depth in a better way". Decider's Meghan O'Keefe has said that Ortega "is what makes Wednesday work", believing that the actress deserves all of the credit for the series's success. Although Ortega was already an established actress, Wednesday has been credited with greatly increasing her fame and making her a household name. Wednesday has been ranked as the best performance or role of Ortega's career. (Note: By Game Rant's Crystal Martin, CBR's Daniel Kurland, and MovieWeb's Aunindita Bhatia.) Emma Myers's brief performance as the character has also been received positively.

=== Criticism ===
The Inquirer's Joseph Atilano has compared the character unfavorably to Christina Ricci's Wednesday, criticizing her reduced deadliness as well as her morality. Collider's Kylie Krabbe has derided the character's privilege as a betrayal of her intended subversiveness. Wednesday's love triangle in the first season was divisive, with Mashable's Belen Edwards adding that it "didn't feel true to the character", while Them's Abby Monteil has considered the queer icon's lack of a queer romance a "missed opportunity". Wednesday's rebelliousness against her mother has been controversial, with many viewers considering it a detraction from Addams Family tradition. Refinery29's Nicole Froio has derided Wednesday's Latina identity as a "quirk rather than an integrated part" of the character.

=== Shipping ===
Collider's Safwan Azeem has written: "Naturally, as is the case with any other teen-oriented show, Wednesday quickly garnered a large fandom, with fans [...] imagining which characters could end up together. Shipping has been a major part of the conversation around Wednesday." Wednesday appears in several of the series's fan-desired romantic pairings, known as "ships". Wednesday and Enid were reportedly "by far the most popular ship in the show" by the end of 2022, with its 7,700+ works on the fanfiction repository Archive of Our Own "far [outnumbering] any actual canon relationships in the show" as of August 2025. Given that Tyler is Wednesday's only canonical romantic interest, they are also one of the series's most popular ships. Although Wednesday and Xavier were "the ship that everyone was talking about when Wednesday premiered back in 2022", Xavier was written out of the series after the first season.

== Analysis ==
=== Zeitgeist ===
L'Officiel has called this iteration of Wednesday Addams "the embodiment of a zeitgeist in which dark aesthetics have become a form of self-expression for an entire generation". Ed Power has written for The Irish Times: "Coming out of the pandemic, millions identified with a shy young woman who wanted nothing more than to be given the space to be herself." Professor Shelley Cobb has commented that the "[new take on the teen trope appeals to Gen Z and their ability to talk about cultural politics and the popular discourse around identity politics, adding a voice to those things in a sharp-witted way]". Indigomusic's Farheen Ali has written that "Ortega’s Wednesday reflects the internal struggles many Gen Z viewers face". Comparing her to Burton's previous characters, Collider's Kylie Krabbe has opined that "Wednesday's current position in her own show is more a sign of the times of what is deemed permissible as the other". Several writers for Screen Rant have opined that this Wednesday is a reflection of modern storytelling, with her age and detective work reflecting modern audiences' interest in teen series, mysteries, and true crime.

=== Comparison to other Wednesdays ===
A cohesive timeline of Wednesday Addams, as proposed by Collider's Elisa Guimarães

Screen Rant's Megan Hemenway has considered this Wednesday perhaps the most unique. Observing that she shares traits with all of her previous iterations, Collider's Elisa Guimarães has mused that "the show creates a cohesive narrative for its titular character that suggests that all those Wednesdays of the past are maybe just multiple facets of the same girl". CBR's Robert Vaux has written that Wednesday's genre difference compared to previous franchise entries has an effect on its title character by placing her in real danger for the first time, giving her vulnerability and audience sympathy. Screen Rant's Angel Shaw has similarly observed that the series "complicates Wednesday's gruesome tendencies by placing her in a more realistic universe".

=== Comparison to other figures and archetypes ===
Literary scholars have placed Wednesday within the "broader Victorian Gothic tradition of the dangerous, knowing girl-child at the edge of society", with her belonging to a lineage of Gothic heroines such as Jane Eyre and Merricat Blackwood. Russell White of Tech Times has called Wednesday a "constitutional flâneur", noting that her psychic visions are "simply the literal expression of what [poet Charles Baudelaire's] figure does metaphorically: touching the surfaces of the city and perceiving what is hidden in them". The Guardian's Janelle Zara has compared Wednesday to a Byronic hero and her narrative arc to "goth Emily in Paris". Psychologist Patric Gagne has compared the nuanced portrayal of Wedneday's alleged sociopathy to characters such as Elphaba, Dexter Morgan, and Larry David. Lorraine Ali of the Los Angeles Times has described Wednesday as a "gothic Nancy Drew". Hemenway has considered Wednesday a symbol of the writer Edgar Allan Poe, noting their shared authorial status and love of mystery and the macabre.

=== Neurodivergence ===
Camille Bassett and Jason Gilmore have written for Communication Monographs: "In the eyes of many Autistic individuals, Wednesday Addams – at the very least, this latest version of her – is clearly and profoundly coded as autistic." Although Wednesday has a long history of autistic coding, they have stated that "the 2022 Wednesday is more stereotypically autistic than ever before". Cited character traits belonging to this Wednesday that are associated with autism include her: monotone voice, flat affect, lack of blinking, difficulty with social cues, sensory preferences and hypersensitivity, dislike of physical touch, strict routines, hyperfixation, heightened attention to detail, honesty, black-and-white thinking, strong sense of justice, and savant abilities. (Note: Sources:) Bassett and Gilmore have also observed that, unique among her classmates, Wednesday is a psychic, a power of the mind. They have written that her mind is "personified as a dark and mysterious place", that her psychic abilities are presented as savant-like, that the "autistic mind [is often stereotypically personified] as a place where the Autistic person can physically retreat into [and can hold] dangerous and extraordinary secrets", and that her risk of insanity is in line with neurodivergent people being presented as crazy and dangerous.

Bassett and Gilmore have considered this coding significant, given the rarity of autistic characters that are not white and male, calling Wednesday "among the very first intersectional portrayals of an autistic-coded person in media". However, although they have highlighted the character's potential relatability to Autistic people, they have also argued that Wednesday's unconfirmed diagnosis and stereotypes "contribute to the symbolic annihilation of Autistic people in media". Digital Spy's Charli Clement has also pondered on Wednesday's representation of neurodivergence, noting how the character's fictionality and pretty privilege might make her more likely to be embraced than other neurodivergent people.

While describing sociopathy as "just a personality disorder", Gagne has explained:

Wednesday Addams is sociopathic. She meets most of the criteria. She's criminally versatile, she has trouble making and forming bonds, she has a low affect, she is manipulative, she's cunning, she's extremely charming. And yet I believe that Wednesday Addams offers a much more complete version of the sociopathic profile. Because in addition to all of those quote on quote 'bad things,' she's also capable of experiencing grief. She struggles to form bonds, but she can do it. She's very loyal to her friends. She's very loving to her family members. And that piece of the puzzle is largely missing in the overall understanding of sociopathy. You see that she can feel, she feels deeply. She feels differently than a neurotypical person does. But that doesn't mean her feelings don't count.

=== Gender and femininity ===
Wednesday's hair and makeup have been considered subversive

Refinery29's Maggie Zhou has opined that Wednesday is terrifying, not because of her supernatural abilities, but because she "denies social attitudes when it comes to what is expected of girls". More specifically, Bassett and Gilmore have written that "Wednesday consistently subverts the gender stereotypes that women must be more passive, agreeable, and emotional than men". They have also observed that "Wednesday carries forward the feminist messaging of the female detective without any of the gender stereotypes often perpetuated through the detective genre, such as the female victim". However, several writers for Continuum have argued that Wednesday plays into the misogynistic trope that a woman can be either feminine or a genius, but not both. CNN's Ella Alexander has regarded Wednesday's hair and makeup, intentionally made to appear lacking in effort, as a "subversion of femininity". Her appearance has also been considered a contrast with 2020s beauty trends, with WWD's Kaleigh Werner calling Wednesday the "archetypal anti-clean girl".

=== Latinx identity ===
Bassett and Gilmore have considered Wednesday's Latinx identity significant, noting the rarity of Latinx characters in media and the normalcy in which that facet of the character's identity is portrayed. They have also written that "Wednesday's denunciation of whitewashing [... brings] to mind the whitewashing of Wednesday herself as a character, a level of meta-awareness that could suggest the show's intention to own up for and rectify this insensitive facet of all previous Addams Family iterations". Observers have noted that Wednesday avoids several tropes common to female Latinx characters, including sexualization, the "can-do Latina" archetype, and "[feistiness]". CBR's Diane Darcy has opined that Wednesday's Latine identity enriches the theme of her being a social outcast, while LatinaMedia.Co's Ces Heredia has commented that the character contrasts with societal expectations placed specifically on Latinas. PopSugar's Cristina Escobar has considered Wednesday an outlier, noting the near-absence of goth Latina characters in media. Connecting the character to the "broader Latinx relationship to Eurocentric goth and post-punk culture", Angie Bonilla has written for the Los Angeles Review of Books PubLab that Wednesday "'browns' the gothic, transforming it into an aesthetic of cultural presence, spectacle, and resistance".

=== Sexual and romantic orientation ===
Fans have viewed Wednesday as a potential LGBTQ+ character. Wednesday "pretty much just [tolerating the] advances" of her male suitors has been cited as one reason for this interpretation. Due to their "long looks [and] intimate secrets", Wednesday's relationship with her roommate, Enid, has been interpreted as potentially romantic. Regarding a scene in which Xavier asks Wednesday about the gender of her hypothetical date, her deflective answer has been seen as a potential opening for the character being bisexual. (Note: The scene goes as follows: Wednesday: "You should know I'm waiting for someone."; Xavier: "Oh, yeah? Who's the lucky guy? Or girl?"; Wednesday: "What does it matter to you?") Wednesday's dislike of physical affection, emotions, and romance has also led to an interpretation of her being aromantic asexual. Den of Geek's Brynna Arens has written that "queerness as a term can be used under that umbrella to refer to anything outside of what society deems 'normal.' [...] Based on this definition, Wednesday already operates in a queer state of being, so it would honestly make way more sense for her to not be straight."

Jezebel's Caitlin Cruz has offered a different view, arguing that the character is straight but that her male suitors are simply uninteresting. Cruz has reminded her readers that Wednesday's status as a gay icon does not necessarily make her gay. Out's Mey Rude has acknowledged that Wednesday's canon romance and "flirtations" are only with male characters.

=== Authorship ===
Wednesday has been described as a Romantic author. In the series, she admits that Mary Shelley (portrayed above) is her "literary hero and nemesis".

Salon's Kelly McClure has called Wednesday a "perfect representative for writers and the writer's way of life", noting her obsession with her writing, love of books, solitude, artistic pride, and theatricality. Musing on the series's dark academia aesthetic, several writers for Continuum have opined that "as an author, Wednesday occupies the most prized position within the dark academic universe and displays the values that define creativity in the historical periods from which the dark academia aesthetic draws inspiration." Specifically, these writers have argued that Wednesday embodies the values and ideals of a Romantic author, noting her originality, individuality, high regard for imagination, solitude, obsessiveness, and attitude towards violence. They have also suggested that Wednesday's status as an author invites viewers to write fanfiction for the series, often centering on Wednesday as a writer. Bonilla has written: "[Wednesday] reconstructs the figure of the gothic writer — historically imagined as a tortured, melancholic man — into a defiant author of color whose morbidity signals not pathology but critique. [...] By positioning a young Latina writer at the symbolic center of an institution named after a central archetype of American gothic tradition, Wednesday stages a rewriting of literary inheritance from the margins."

=== Other analysis ===
Defining "detective" as a hybrid stereotype, Bassett and Gilmore have dubbed Wednesday "media's first-ever female Latinx detective". Zara has written that "Wednesday is both the underdog misfit and the hottest girl in school, the product of the unlikeliest of mergers". Inverse's Dais Johnston has observed Wednesday's "stark character change" in the second half of the first season, which "allows her to grow from an amusing side character into a protagonist in her own right."

== See also ==
- List of Wednesday characters

== Sources ==
- Bassett, Camille; Gilmore, Jason (February 10, 2025). "Shifting the paradigm with Wednesday Addams: An intersectional analysis of the first (Autistic) female Latinx detective". Communication Monographs. 92 (3). Taylor & Francis: 626–652. doi:10.1080/03637751.2025.2455715.
- Balkin, Sarah; Dane, Alexander; Driscoll, Beth; O'Meara, Radha; Vincent, Caitlin (July 3, 2025). "Authorship across media: considering Wednesday Addams". Continuum. 39 (4). Taylor & Francis: 632–645. doi:10.1080/10304312.2025.2518968. hdl:11343/356982.
