= Enid Sinclair =

Wednesday character

- Wednesday character
- Emma Myers as Enid Sinclair
- First appearance: "Wednesday's Child is Full of Woe"; November 23, 2022
- Created by: Alfred Gough; Miles Millar
- Portrayed by: Emma Myers; Jenna Ortega ("Woe Thyself")

In-universe information
- Occupation: Student
- Family: Esther Sinclair (mother) (Note: Although their names are never given in the series, the credits for Season 1 Episode 5 list the guest appearances of Esther and Murray Sinclair.); Murray Sinclair (father); Unnamed older brothers; Lucille (cousin)
- Home: San Francisco, California; Nevermore Academy
- Outcast type: Alpha werewolf
- Age: 16 (first season) (Note: Although her age is never stated in the series, the pilot script describes Enid as being sixteen.)
- Friends: Wednesday Addams

Enid Sinclair is a fictional character and major character of the Netflix television series Wednesday. She is portrayed by Emma Myers. A werewolf student at Nevermore Academy, Enid is the roommate and eventual friend of Wednesday Addams. The character was designed as a foil for Wednesday, with Enid's colorful personality contrasting the macabre nature of the series' titular character.

A fan favorite, Enid is one of the series' most significant characters. Her friendship with Wednesday is the story's central theme according to its creators and has been considered one of its strongest elements. Enid's characterization in the second season met criticism, while the character's potential queer coding has been analyzed. Emma Myers's role as Enid in the first season was her breakthrough, which established her as a rising star.

== Concept and creation ==
In conceiving Wednesday as a character study of teenage Wednesday Addams, which would explore her social dynamics at a boarding school, showrunners Alfred Gough and Miles Millar gave her a roommate, Enid, who would serve as a "counterpoint". While Wednesday retained her decades-old goth personality, the creators made Enid colorful, friendly, bright, bouncy, and modern to differentiate between the two characters. Gough and Millar made the concept for the character sometime between mid-2019, when general concept work on the series began, and early 2020, when Enid appeared in the series' pilot script.

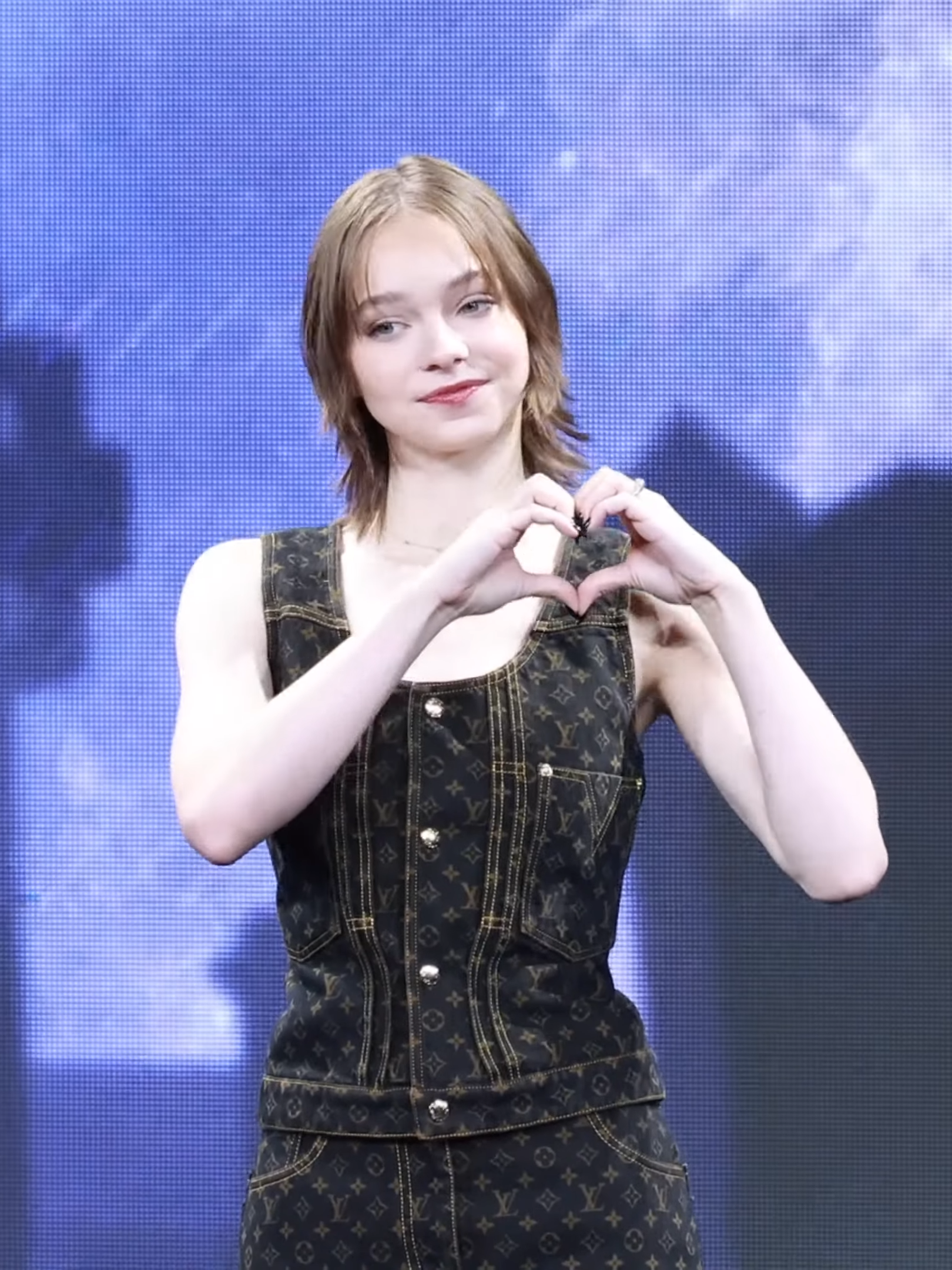
Emma Myers portrays Enid Sinclair

In June 2021, Emma Myers was cast in Wednesday as Enid Sinclair. She was considered for the role after having unsuccessfully auditioned for the lead role of Wednesday Addams earlier that year. Playing as Enid came naturally to Myers, though the actress also attended a "werewolf boot camp". Myers brought physicality to the role, reminding herself to keep moving. The character of Enid Sinclair was also briefly played by Jenna Ortega, as the result of a body swap subplot in the series' second season. Ortega had insufficient time to research and prepare for the role and thus relied on imitating Myers.

Regarding the character's visual appearance, director Tim Burton wanted Enid to look like she "does it herself, and every week she tries a different thing, and it doesn't really work". In line with the characters' juxtaposition, Colleen Atwood's costume team designed the wardrobes of Enid and Wednesday in tandem. While both characters' clothes had similar "geometrics", Enid was given an opposing sunny color palette. Atwood chose furrier textures to symbolize Enid's werewolf nature and opted for stronger colors, wanting to avoid the expected "girliness" of pastels. Myers also helped craft her character's style. The production team wanted Enid's living space to represent her "colorful isolation" prior to Wednesday's arrival. In contrast with the minimalism of Wednesday's side, a maximalist approach was taken when designing Enid's side of the dorm room.

For the second season, seeking to give Wednesday new obstacles, the creators made Enid's relationship with her roommate "treacherous". To reflect her newfound confidence and make her seem "reborn" that season, Enid was given a bolder and edgier appearance. The costume team took much inspiration from Japanese street fashion for Enid's casual wear, while her hairstyle was influenced by cyberpunk. Myers added more to the character, rather than changing anything fundamental. Gough considered the revelation of Enid being a feared "alpha" werewolf to be a twist on the character's ability.

== Story significance ==
"You have a show that is about, at its core, these two teenage girls who need each other and have found that connection."

— Miles Millar, interview with Decider

Millar has stated that Enid's friendship with Wednesday is "key to our sort of vision of the show", while both showrunners have indicated that the friendship is the central theme of the series. (Note: On several occasions, Gough and Millar have explicitly said that the series is about Enid and Wednesday: Millar: "You have a show that is about, at its core, these two teenage girls who need each other and have found that connection."; Gough: "And it's really a show exploring that female friendship [between Enid and Wednesday]."; Millar: "That relationship between Enid and Wednesday is really the heart of the show. [...] Last season, she got a friend, who was Enid, and this season is about her learning what that means and how to navigate something she's never done before."; Other times, Gough and Millar have instead said that the series is about female friendship, while describing Enid and Wednesday as central to that theme: Gough: "For us, the show also is really about this female friendship, with Wednesday and Enid really being at the center of that."; Gough: "And I think for us, female friendship has always been at the core of this, especially with Wednesday and Enid being them."; Millar: "It's really about female friendship with Enid and Wednesday and then throwing Agnes into that as well.")

In the series' first season, Enid serves as a linchpin for Wednesday's character arc, with their hug concluding it. The hug serves as the emotional climax of the season, according to Millar. The second season's plot revolves around Wednesday trying to save her roommate's life while learning how to navigate their new friendship. Enid's sacrifice serves as the "climactic moment of the season's heart", according to Millar, while the status of her humanity leaves the season on a cliffhanger ending.

Writing for Collider, Ryan Looney has suggested that Enid is maybe the most important character in the series aside from Wednesday herself, while Safwan Azeem has considered the two characters equally important to the story. YourTango's Victoria Soliz has regarded Enid as one of the series' two main characters, alongside her roommate.

== Character biography ==
=== Background ===
Enid Sinclair grew up with older brothers in an elitist San Francisco werewolf family. However, her werewolf development was stunted, leaving her with only retractable claws and enhanced physical strength. According to an esteemed "lycanologist", Enid developing the ability to transform was not guaranteed, leaving her future with the pack uncertain.

At some point, Enid began attending Nevermore Academy, a boarding school for "outcasts", outside of Jericho, Vermont. Enid lived alone in the academy's attic as a member of Ophelia Hall, one of the four houses of Nevermore Academy. Despite being unhappy with her isolation, she had a romantic affection for gorgon classmate Ajax Petropolus and a gossiping blog. Enid found only rumors of murder when gossiping about her incoming roommate, a mid-semester transfer student named Wednesday Addams. Enid was sixteen years old by the time Wednesday arrived.

=== Season 1 ===
Enid welcomes Wednesday but meets a cold reception. Wednesday vandalizes Enid's room, insults her, and makes a physical threat, but dorm overseer Marilyn Thornhill defuses the situation. The two make peace and learn more about each other, as Enid meets Thing, Wednesday's sentient disembodied hand minion. After Wednesday decides to remain at the school, Enid begins trying to befriend her, having already befriended Thing. With help and influence from Wednesday, Enid is victorious in a multi-sport team competition, claiming her dormitory's first school title in decades. Ajax asks Enid for a date; she agrees but is stood up. To make Ajax jealous, Enid accepts an invite to the school dance from Lucas Walker, the mayor's son. She connects with Lucas at the dance but is betrayed by him, as he sabotages the event. Ajax reveals that his date absence was the result of an embarrassing accident, and the two share a kiss.

Enid begins a casual relationship with Ajax. She refuses her visiting mother's suggestion to attend a werewolf summer camp, comparing it to conversion therapy. Enid organizes sixteenth birthday celebrations for Wednesday, who manipulates her into bypassing a school lockdown so she can investigate local attacks. The roommates discover evidence but are nearly killed by a monster in the process. Finally fed up with Wednesday's lack of empathy, Enid moves out of the dorm room but eventually moves back, citing a variety of reasons. Wednesday outs her love interest Tyler Galpin as the monster (Hyde) to Enid and is expelled from Nevermore Academy. As the roommates share their goodbyes, Enid credits her new confidence to Wednesday and promises to protect the school from Tyler. Enid is informed that Thornhill has murdered Nevermore's principal and kidnapped Wednesday. Ajax introduces Enid to the Nightshades, a secret society of which he is a member. They plan an evacuation of Nevermore, fearing its prophesized destruction. Enid and Thing leave to rescue Wednesday. Under a full blood moon, Enid transforms into a werewolf for the first time. She saves Wednesday's life and battles Tyler, whom she defeats with help from the sheriff. After Nevermore is saved, Enid and Wednesday share a hug for the first time. Classes are cancelled, and Enid invites Wednesday to visit her in San Francisco.

=== Season 2 ===
By the start of the next school year, Enid views herself as a changed person, having "found herself" after her werewolf transformation. Now more interested in the pack (including werewolf student Bruno Yuson), she has lost feelings for Ajax but remains friends with Wednesday, who now also considers her a friend. The roommates face threats from Wednesday's unknown stalker, who nearly kills both of them. Enid and several other classmates receive a hero's welcome to Nevermore after the events of last school year, but Wednesday ruins the official celebration. Enid tries to confront Wednesday about the incident, but Wednesday suffers a psychic seizure as she has a prophetic vision that she will be responsible for Enid's premature death. Enid and Bruno are kidnapped by an unknown assailant, and the two share a kiss while trying to escape. The pair are nearly killed but are rescued by Wednesday, with the kidnapper revealing herself to be Wednesday's stalker, Agnes DeMille. Enid begins a casual relationship with Bruno and is appalled to see Wednesday associating with Agnes. Enid formally breaks up with Ajax. She confronts her roommate on her emotional distance before saving Thing's life during an attack on the school. Serving as a lookout during her friend's prison break at a local asylum, Enid sees a freed Tyler defenestrate Wednesday, placing her in a coma.

Wednesday returns from her coma and informs Enid that Tyler plans to murder them, causing an argument. Enid, Wednesday, Bruno, and the Nightshades attempt to chemically subjugate Tyler. Enid is nearly killed, but Wednesday saves her life, and Tyler flees after outside intervention. Enid transforms into a werewolf despite the absence of a full moon. She is informed that she might be an "alpha", a rare kind of werewolf that typically leads a solitary life. After another argument, Enid follows Wednesday to a supernatural headstone, which swaps the bodies of the two roommates. While in Wednesday's body, Enid learns the hard way that Wednesday is actually allergic to color and is invited to a family dinner by Wednesday's mother Morticia. Enid reads Wednesday's novel to prepare for her meeting with the Addamses, but is shocked to find out that Wednesday considers her a weak person in need of her pity and protection. She retaliates by dancing around the school in colorful clothing in front of all the students. Enid later hears from Agnes that Wednesday has broken up with Bruno on her behalf and been secretly trying to save her from a foreseen death, before snapping at her. Despite the body swap endangering their lives, Enid and Wednesday rescue Agnes from Tyler and his family. The roommates return to the headstone, reveal what they learned about each other during the body swap, and return to each other's bodies, resolving Wednesday's premonition. Bruno seeks Enid's forgiveness for cheating on her, asking to escort her to the school gala. Enid learns that, as an alpha, a transformation under a full moon will likely result in her becoming a werewolf permanently and being hunted. Wednesday agrees to rescue her in this scenario. At the gala, Enid learns Bruno is still cheating on her and befriends Agnes after the latter confesses she just wanted to make friends. Enid and Agnes perform a dance routine to distract the nefarious school principal, resulting in his death. When Nevermore closes early again, Enid platonically reconciles with Ajax. To save Wednesday from a live burial, Enid transforms under a full moon to dig her out. Stuck as a werewolf, she flees north towards the border of Canada, awaiting Wednesday's rescue.

== Reception and impact ==
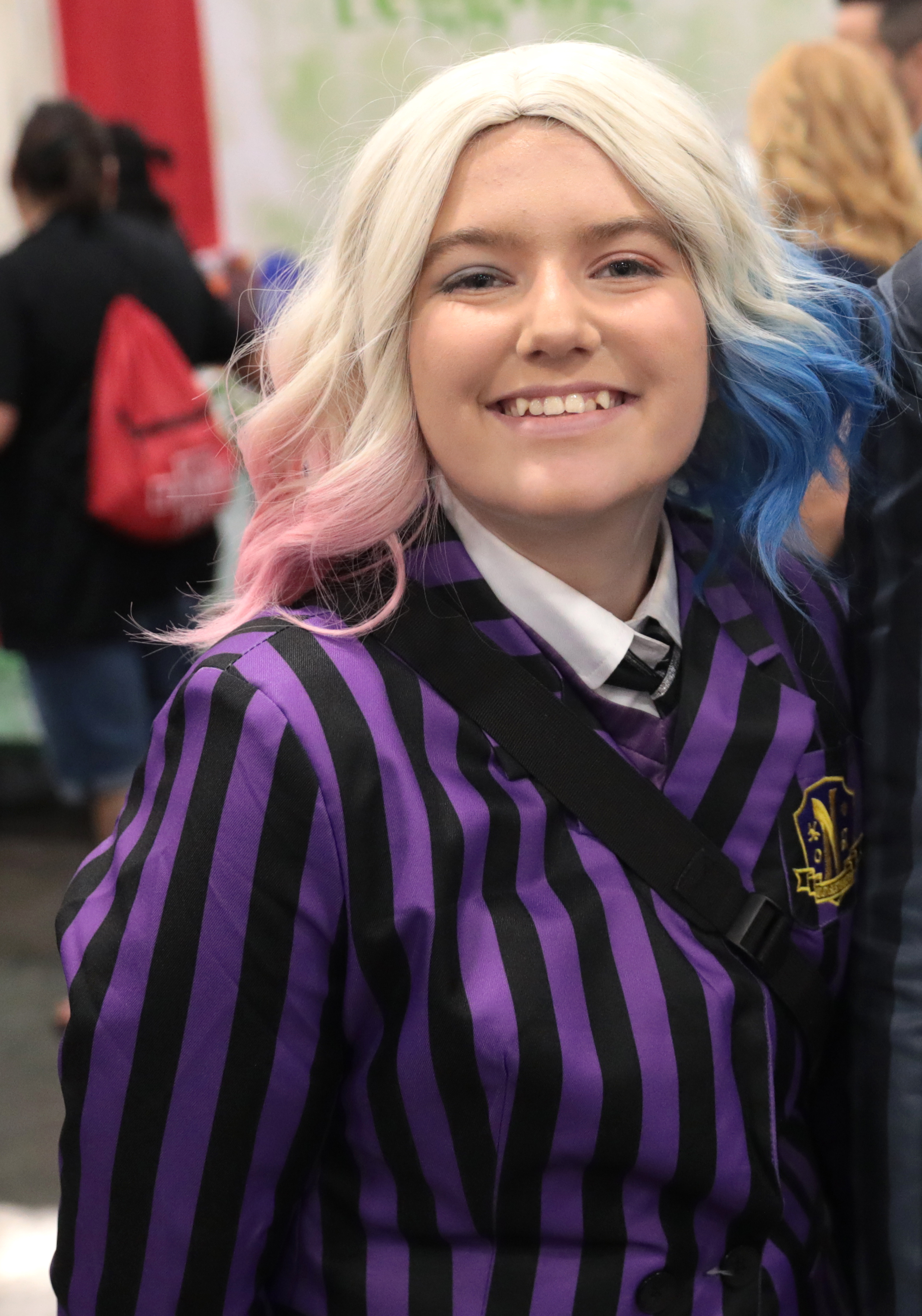
A fan cosplaying as Enid Sinclair in 2023

Enid has met a positive reception from fans and several writers. She has often been described as beloved or a fan favorite, (Note: Described as such by Erin Johnson of Screen Rant, Cherry Liu of the South China Morning Post, Schenelle Dsouza of Cosmopolitan, Aya Tsintziras of GameRant, Riley Utley of CinemaBlend, Capella Gonzalez of Screen Rant, Angel Shaw of Screen Rant, Valerie Soto of MovieWeb, and Hope Sloop of Decider.) with Screen Rant's Zach Bowen calling her a breakout character. Several journalists have praised Enid as lovable. (Note: Including Eden Kutschker of Collider, Jake Dee of MovieWeb and Screen Rant, Claudia Picado of Collider, and Abigail Stevens of Screen Rant.) MovieWeb's Jake Dee wrote that, by the end of the first season, Enid was "as likable as the title character, if not more". Josh Bell of CBR considered Enid to have made the strongest impression in an otherwise largely bland supporting cast. Also writing for CBR, Andrea Sandoval considered the introduction of a character like Enid into the world of The Addams Family to be a bold choice, but it was one that Collider's Chris Sasaguay thought fit surprisingly well. Sasaguay credited this to Enid serving as a "shining spot" within the macabre atmosphere of the rest of the series, making her a "breath of fresh air", in the words of Screen Rant's Felipe Rangel. Multiple writers have praised Enid as interesting and compelling on her own, with her depth "complicating what could have been a seemingly simple character".

Journalists have highlighted Enid's relationship with Wednesday. Screen Rant's Erin Johnson has described it as the "cornerstone" of the series. It has been considered one of the series' best strengths, (Note: By Erin Johnson of Screen Rant, Abby Monteil of Them, Dyah Ayu Larasati of Collider, Aimee Hart of Polygon, and actress Jenna Ortega, who portrays Wednesday in the series.) or even its outright best strength. The chemistry of the characters and their respective actresses has often been highlighted. (Note: Journalists who have highlighted the chemistry of Enid and Wednesday (or Emma Myers and Jenna Ortega in Wednesday) include Andrea Sandoval of CBR, Henry Ladd of Screen Rant, Gabbi Shaw of Business Insider, Sophie Jacklin of CBR, Diane Darcy of CBR, Asyia Iftikhar of PinkNews, Branyan Towe of Loud and Clear Reviews, Dylan Kickham of Elite Daily, Monica Coman of Screen Rant, and Ash Thomas of Her Campus.) Collider's Chris Sasaguay described the characters' dynamic as a fun contrast, finding their interactions to be hilarious. Considered the emotional core or "heart" of the series by several writers, (Note: Including Jerome Casio of Screen Rant, Chris Sasaguay of Collider, Abby Monteil of Them, Aimee Hart of Polygon, and Cassandra D'Agosta of Screen Rant.) the friendship has been ranked by MovieWeb's Grace Amadi as the most heartwarming in television. Two writers for Screen Rant credited the duo with playing a key role in the first season's success. By 2025, Cosmopolitan's Schenelle Dsouza had described the friendship as "now iconic". The roommates' estrangement was among the most common criticisms of the second season, according to Screen Rant.

Certain aspects of Enid's characterization and storyline have met criticism by some reviewers. Angel Shaw of Screen Rant found that Enid's transformation at the end of the first season dulled her story of self-acceptance, while Brittany Knupper of The Mary Sue thought that Enid's conversion therapy metaphor didn't "add up". Multiple journalists criticized the character's love triangle and changes in the second season. (Note: Including Gaby Shedwick of Collider, David Opie of GamesRadar+, Jake Dee of MovieWeb, and Aimee Hart of Polygon.) Regarding the first half of that season, David Opie of GamesRadar+ considered her more of a MacGuffin than a key character, while Collider's Gaby Shedwick described her as a romance-focused "caricature". Both lamented how Enid's changes affected her relationship with Wednesday, which Opie had hoped would become romantic.

Emma Myers's performance as Enid has been praised by Mashable's Shannon Connellan, writing that her "delightful, dramatic performance truly distinguishes Enid from Ortega's brutal Wednesday", while Screen Rant's Felipe Rangel has highlighted Myers's constant charisma. MovieWeb's Jake Dee wrote that "Myers' performance was so strong and affecting that it helped forge her path towards Hollywood's A-list". Hedy Phillips wrote in People that Enid proved to be a "breakout role" for Myers that launched her into "superstardom". Myers had roughly 9,000 followers on Instagram at the time of Wednesday's release before gaining several million in a matter of days. In the years following the success of Wednesday's first season, Myers played a part in several other works, including A Good Girl's Guide to Murder and A Minecraft Movie. By 2026, Myers had appeared on the Forbes 30 Under 30 list.

=== Analysis ===
Andrea Sandoval of CBR has suggested that Enid is arguably the "real main character" of Wednesday, citing her coming of age story, uniqueness among the cast, character development, and heroic season finale moment, among other reasons. Writers for Screen Rant and Collider have observed Enid's evolution over the course of the first season from a comic relief sidekick with little plot relevance into a character with her own development who acts as a "major player in the events occurring at Nevermore Academy". Collider's Jay Snow has described Enid as "Wednesday's perfect partner in crime", noting how her supernatural strength synergizes with her roommate's clairvoyance and intelligence, while Myers has added that Enid's love for gossip allows her to act as Wednesday's informant.

Several observers have noted similarities between Enid's hairstyle and the transgender flag

Discussion has been held on the possibility of Enid being queer coded. (Note: Journalists who have shared interpretations or fans' interpretations of Enid being queer coded include Diane Darcy of CBR, Jessica Scott of Film Cred, Alastair James of Attitude, Sam Prance of Capital, David Opie of Digital Spy, Asyia Iftikhar of PinkNews, Ash Thomas of Her Campus, and Victoria Soliz of YourTango.) Several fans and Alastair James of Attitude interpreted the character as being trans-coded. Enid's possibility of attending a conversion therapy camp along with the interpretation of her possibly having romantic feelings for Wednesday have been common points of analysis. James has also pointed to Enid's fear of losing her family and abundance of colors and rainbows in her decorations. Her Campus' Ash Thomas has noted Enid abruptly changing heterosexual relationships and not being very upset when a new boyfriend is revealed to be cheating on her. PinkNews has reported on some fans interpreting Enid as being a metaphor for people in the closet. Enid's hair has been noted for sharing the same colors as the transgender flag or bisexual flag, while one of her sweaters has been noted for sharing the same colors as the lesbian flag.

The Mary Sue's Brittany Knupper has found Enid's werewolf experiences to be an explicit metaphor for puberty. Collider's Eden Kutschker has suggested that Enid's lovability comes only from her contrast with Wednesday, implying the character would be insufferable on her own. Film Cred's Jessica Scott has compared the character to Harry Potter's Luna Lovegood.

=== Wenclair ===
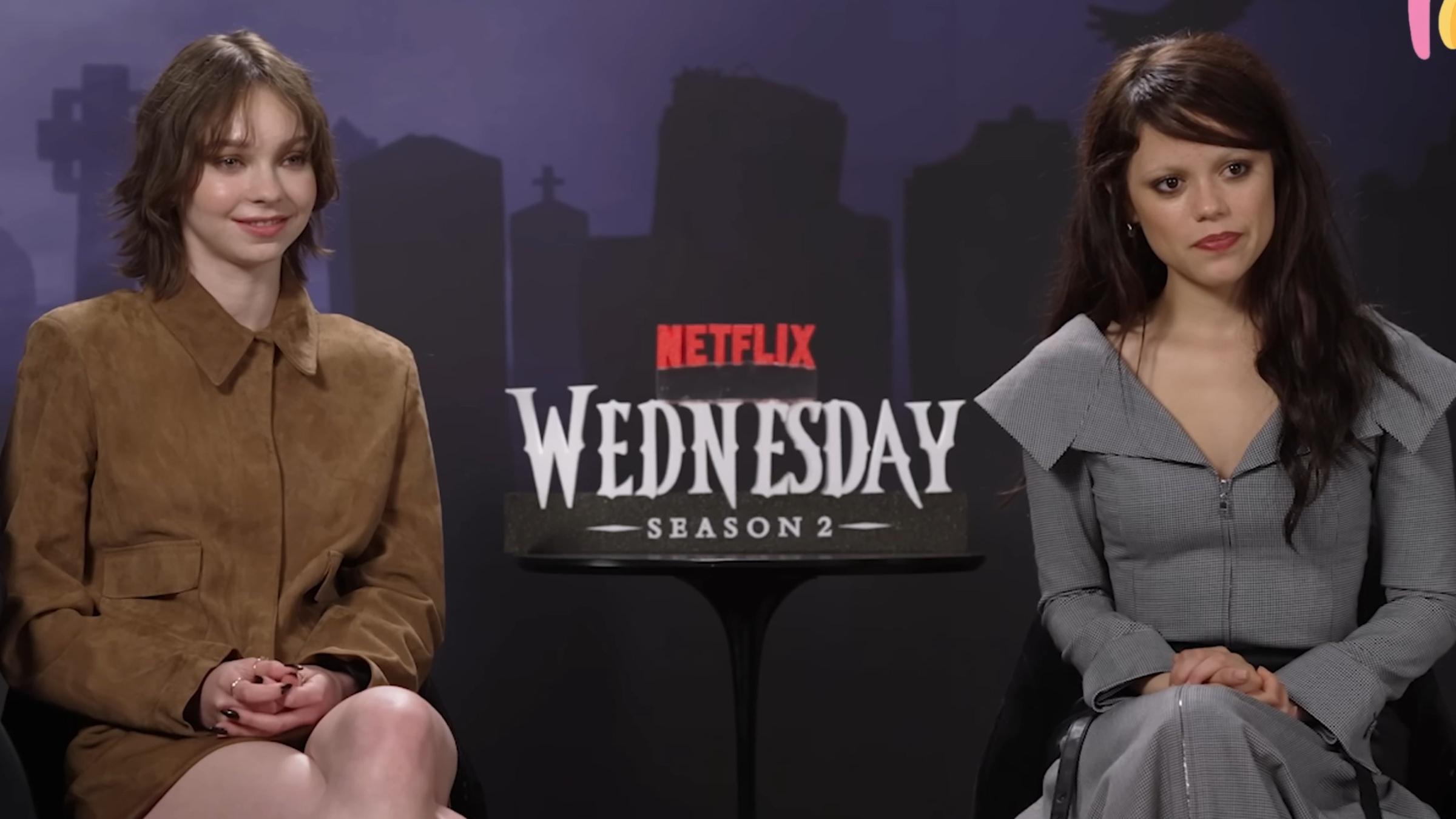
L–R: Wednesday actors Emma Myers and Jenna Ortega during a 2025 interview

Fans and commentators have noted a romantic chemistry between Enid and the show's lead character, Wednesday Addams, with the ship gaining the colloquial moniker of "Wenclair". However, this was never materialized in the show, contributing to allegations of queerbaiting, also spurred on by Netflix having promoted the show with an event entitled "WednesGay" in 2022. In 2025, the show's creators, Alfred Gough and Miles Millar, clarified that a romantic relationship between the two was not intended.

== See also ==
- List of Wednesday characters
