= Alexandra (disambiguation) =

Alexandra is the feminine form of the given name Alexander.

Alexandra may also refer to:

== Arts and entertainment ==
- Alexandra (1914 film), a German silent film
- Alexandra, the name under which the operetta Princess Charming was first presented in 1925
- Alexandra, an alternative name for the 1934 film Princess Charming
- Alexandra (2007 film), a Russian film
- Alexandra, a poem traditionally attributed to the Hellenistic Greek poet Lycophron
- "Alexandra" (poem), a poem by Mongane Wally Serote
- Alexandra (singer), stage name of German singer Doris Nefedov (1942–1969)
- Alexandra (Nikita character), a character in the television series Nikita

== Football clubs ==
- Alexandra Athletic F.C., Scottish football club
- Crewe Alexandra F.C., English football club
- Mold Alexandra F.C., Welsh football club

== Places ==
=== Australia and New Zealand ===
- Alexandra, Victoria, Australia
- Alexandra, New Zealand, a town in Central Otago, New Zealand
- Alexandra, the former name of Pirongia, Waikato, New Zealand
- Alexandra Land, a former name for the southern half of Australia's Northern Territory.

=== United Kingdom ===
- Alexandra (Kingston upon Thames ward)
- Alexandra Ward, Ipswich
- Alexandra (Manchester ward)
- Alexandra (Penarth electoral ward)

=== Elsewhere ===
- Alexandra (provincial electoral district), a former electoral district in Alberta, Canada
- Alexandra, Gauteng, a township near Johannesburg, South Africa
- 54 Alexandra, an asteroid

== Ships ==
- HMS Alexandra (1875), a British ironclad battleship
- HMY Alexandra, a British royal yacht built in 1908
- MS Alexandra, a Panamanian and Italian cruise ship in service from 1988 to 1992

== Other uses ==
- Alexandra Bridge (disambiguation), various bridges
- Alexandra Hospital (disambiguation), various hospitals
- Alexandra School (disambiguation), various schools
- 3061 Alexandra, a GWR 3031 Class locomotive built in 1897
- Alexandra (1905 automobile), an early British automobile
- Alexandra (wet fly), an artificial fly
- Tropical Storm Alexandra, a 1991 Indian Ocean tropical cyclone

== See also ==
- Alejandra (disambiguation)
- Alexander (disambiguation)
- Alexandra Gardens (disambiguation)
- Alexandra Park (disambiguation)
- Alexandra Stadium, in Crewe, England, United Kingdom
- Alexandra Stadium (South Africa)
- Alexandre (disambiguation)
- Alexandria (disambiguation)
- Alexandrina (disambiguation)
- Alexandrine (disambiguation)
- The Alexandra (disambiguation)
