= 2002–03 S.L. Benfica season =

Benfica
2002–03 season
- President: Manuel Vilarinho
- Head coach: Jesualdo Ferreira (until 25 November 2002); Fernando Chalana (caretaker for one match); José Antonio Camacho
- Stadium: Estádio da Luz (until 22 March 2003); Estádio Nacional
- Primeira Liga: 2nd
- Taça de Portugal: Fourth round
- Top goalscorer: League: Simão (18); All: Simão (18)
- Highest home attendance: 55,000 v Santa Clara (22 March 2003)
- Lowest home attendance: 10,000 v Moreirense (3 February 2003)
- Biggest win: Benfica 7–0 Paços de Ferreira (10 November 2002)
- Biggest defeat: 1 goal difference in 6 matches
Home colours	Away colours

The 2002–03 season was Sport Lisboa e Benfica's 99th season in existence and the club's 69th consecutive season in the top flight of Portuguese football. During the season, which lasted from 1 July 2002 to 30 June 2003, Benfica competed in the Primeira Liga and the Taça de Portugal.

Going into a second year without UEFA competitions, qualifying for Europe was one of the club's top priorities; to improve its competitiveness, Benfica signed some of the best domestic players, Ricardo Rocha and Petit, but also brought back former players, like Hélder and Nuno Gomes. Jesualdo Ferreira remained as manager for his first full season on the club.

Benfica's season started with four consecutive victories, to lead the league. In late September, they experienced their first loss and went on a win-less spree that saw them drop to fifth. In November, Benfica won again, but the results remained erratic and after a 7–0 trashing of Paços de Ferreira, they lost to Varzim. A few days later, in the Portuguese Cup, a home loss against Gondomar cost Ferreira his job. Fernando Chalana replaced him for one match, before the appointment of José Antonio Camacho.

With the Spaniard in charge, Benfica regained second place and slowly opened a gap over Sporting, eventually finishing with 75 points, qualifying for the 2003–04 UEFA Champions League. Despite this, Camacho was unable to close the distance to Porto, who finished 11 points ahead. The season was also the last that Benfica played in the original Estádio da Luz, before a new version was built ahead of UEFA Euro 2004. Their final game was on 22 March 2003, with the remaining games being played in the Estádio Nacional in Oeiras.

== Season summary ==
=== Pre-season ===
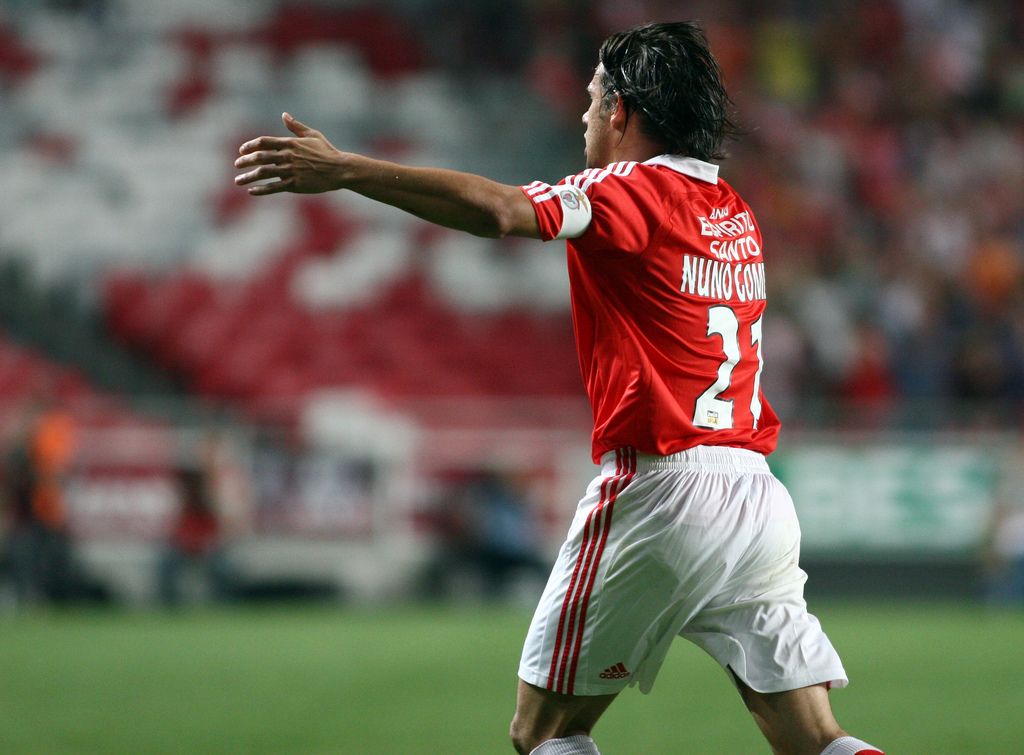
Nuno Gomes returned to Benfica in July.

Although he only guided the team to fourth place in the previous campaign, Jesualdo Ferreira remained in charge of the team, with overwhelming support from inside the club, especially from former Director of Football Gaspar Ramos and former President Manuel Dámasio, who said he was "the best solution to lead Benfica". In the transfer season, Maniche and Robert Enke left the club as their contracts expired; the former joined Porto, the latter, Barcelona. Marco Caneira and Edgaras Jankauskas also left, as Benfica did not get their loan deals renewed; with Jankauskas immediately moving to Porto. Benfica replaced Jankauskas with Nuno Gomes on a free transfer after the collapse of Fiorentina. Gomes scored 76 goals in his first spell at Benfica; expectations were high, with crowds gathering to see him in training sessions. He joined a depleted attack, which only had the new signing from Porto Miklós Fehér as option, as both Mantorras and Tomo Šokota were injured. The back four was also strengthened, with Benfica bringing back Hélder after six seasons abroad and adding Ricardo Rocha, a young defender from Braga.

The pre-season began on 9 July with a week of training before the club travelled to Switzerland on the 13th, where they played their first two games of the pre-season, against Étoile Carouge and Auxerre. After a game in Palermo with Inter Milan on 21 July, Benfica returned to Portugal the next day, meeting up with Sporting in the Superbola Trophy on the 28th. With three more matches in early August, including one in the Guadiana Trophy, Benfica closed its season preparation with a match against European champions Real Madrid on 17 August, a week before the first official game.

=== August–October ===
Benfica started the 2002–03 Primeira Liga campaign at home against Marítimo, scoring twice in the first half, leading to a 3–0 win. The following Saturday, they played Beira-Mar away and won 2–0 after an early lead; according to Manuel Queiroz of Record, despite "dominating in the first half, [Benfica] suffered to retain the lead in the second, with the two nil only arriving right near the end". The club ended the month sharing first place with two other teams, but with a higher goal average than them.

The team began September with a 3–2 away win against Moreirense; Fehér had a decisive influence, earning a penalty and scoring the winner in the 78th minute. Benfica won their fourth consecutive game on 21 September, with a 3–1 win at home against União de Leiria. In the second half, Simão scored his fourth and fifth league goals, unlocking the game that was tied 1–1 at half-time. They ended September with a visit to Estádio da Madeira to play Nacional. The game ended with a 0–1 loss; according to José Ribeiro writing for Record, "after two warnings in the previous two games, the inevitable happened. With known defensive weaknesses, Benfica was winning because of their players intelligence (Zahovič and Petit) and talent (Simão). Only yesterday, none of that worked, given that Peseiro read the game very well and found Benfica's problems ... ".

Benfica hosted Vitória Setúbal on 5 October, dropping two points in a 1–1 draw, due to a "childish error, or better yet, a lack of sharpness of the back-four", in the words of Ricardo Tavares from Record. On 20 October, Benfica met Porto in Estádio das Antas for the Clássico. It was an intense match, with 3 ejections and 73 fouls. Porto won 2–1 because to António Tadeira, they "reacted better to playing outnumbered, while Benfica lost their focus when Paulo Costa sent off Éder and then Miguel". Six days later, for the final game of the month, Benfica played Académica at home. The final score of 1–1 was the best possible, because Académica scored the first goal in the 86th minute, giving Benfica only a few minutes to level the game, which Carlitos did in the 90th minute. Benfica ended the month in fifth place, having won only two of nine possible points.

=== November–February ===
At the beginning of November, Benfica headed to the Azores to play Santa Clara. They won 2–1 due to a double from Simão. A week later, the team played Paços de Ferreira in the Estádio da Luz. The game ended with a 7–0 win for Benfica; Antonio Tadeia writing for Record said the win "showed that Benfica it is alive and well in the league, even without two internationals, Simão and Petit". On 16 November, Benfica played Varzim away, resulting in a 1–2 loss; Rui Dias wrote for Record that, Varzim "adjusted better to the windstorm night and to the soaking wet field ... taking the initiative in the search for the three points".

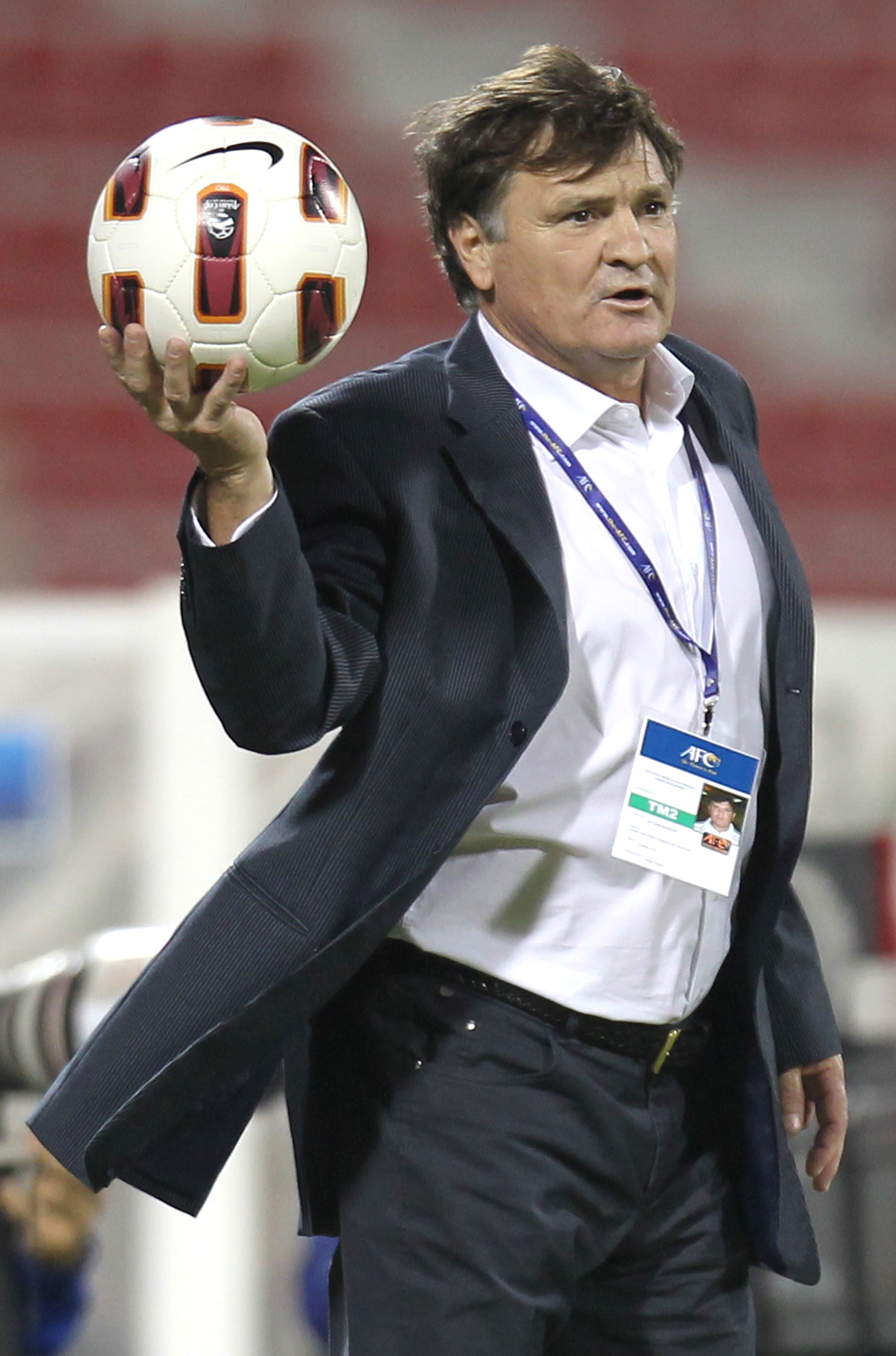
José Antonio Camacho took over as manager in November.

On 24 November, Benfica started the 2002–03 Taça de Portugal by playing Gondomar at home for the fourth round. A 10th-minute goal from Cilio knocked Benfica out of the competition. Tinoco de Faria, the club vice-president, called the defeat "unacceptable"; Jesualdo Ferreira was relieved of his duties the day after. Benfica appointed Fernando Chalana as caretaker until they could agree terms with José Antonio Camacho. On the day Camacho arrived to sign with Benfica, Chalana led the team against Braga at home. He moved Miguel to right-back and started Hélder instead of João Manuel Pinto; Benfica defeated the visitors by 3–0.

In the opening match of December, Benfica played Gil Vicente at home after rescheduling the game from 29 November to 4 December, because of an imminent players strike during the holidays. They won that match 3–1 with two first-half goals; António Varela wrote that the unpredictability of Simão "unbalanced the opponent and the game"; Benfica climbed to second place before a match against Sporting. On 7 December, Benfica played their last game in the 46-year-old Estádio de Alvalade against city rivals Sporting in the Lisbon derby. The game ended with a 2–0 win for Benfica, who controlled the game from the beginning; as José Manuel Delgado wrote, " ... the advantage of the visitors starting in the clear superiority of Tiago and Petit in the direct contend with Paulo Bento and Rui Bento, while Zahovic descended to guide the team ... ". A week later, the team played Belenenses at home. Simão scored the sole goal of the game in the 55th minute, helping Camacho to a third consecutive win. During the last game of the month, Benfica played Boavista away, drawing 0–0; José Manuel Delgado at Record criticized the players of both teams for "showing little inspiration and inability to break away from the tight tactical requirements of the game".

Early in January 2003, Benfica announced the signing of Brazilian midfielder Geovanni, on a loan deal from Barcelona until the end of the season. On 11 January, the team played Vitória Guimarães away. The 1–1 draw after 90 minutes was a consequence of the constant interruptions for a large number of fouls signalled by the referee. In the stands, the problematic behaviour of the Benfica supporters group No Name Boys caused the governing body of the Portuguese league to punish both clubs by closing their stadiums for one game each. On the following Sunday, Benfica visited the Estádio dos Barreiros for a game against Marítimo, which Benfica won 2–1 after an individual effort from Nuno Gomes in the 74th minute. It was the first win there since 1994–95. After selecting the Estádio Municipal Dr. Alves Vieira in Torres Novas to replace Estádio da Luz, Benfica hosted Beira-Mar on 26 January, winning 1–0 with a goal from Geovanni. Three days later, the team played the second friendly of the month after a 1–1 draw against Ajax a week before. During the game, intended to bring people to Da Luz, Benfica lost 0–1 to Barcelona.

On 1 February, Benfica played Moreirense at home, drawing 1–1; Rui Dias wrote that the team's overconfidence was the main reason for the draw because they were "unsettled by the lack of space ... they allowed the clock to run, certain a goal would arrive, soon or later". On 8 February, Benfica visited the Estádio Municipal da Marinha Grande to play União de Leiria. The final score, 3–0 to Benfica, was the biggest in the Camacho era; António Tadeia, writing for Record, complimented the team for the "more pleasing performance, after the very poor display against Moreirense". The following Sunday, Benfica played Nacional at home. According to Rui Dias' match analysis in Record, the team strong first half " .. left the feeling that two goals were not enough in such a display of power ... ", allowing them to manage the game in the second half, ensuring a 2–0 win and reducing the distance to Porto to 10 points. Benfica won their third consecutive match on 22 February; a 6–2 away win against Vitória Setúbal. The opponents took an early lead in the 18th minute when Pascal scored a goal, and doubled their advantage five minutes later; however, in a strong second half, Benfica overturned the game. Simão scored a hat-trick, aided by Tiago and Tomo Šokota, who also scored goals.

=== March–June ===
On 4 March, Benfica played Porto on the last Clássico to be held at the Estádio da Luz. Porto won 1–0 through Deco's goal, in a match that Manuel Queiroz at Record defined as " ... ending the last doubts of who is the future champion and who is the best team in the league, defeating Camacho's Benfica for the first time ... " Benfica rebounded with an away win against Académica on 15 March, beating them 4–1 in the Municipal José Bento Pessoa in Figueira da Foz. A week later, Benfica had its last game on the old Estádio da Luz before the 49-year-old stadium's demolition, playing against Santa Clara. The match ended in a 1–0 win for Benfica, but António Tadeia described the performance as "colourless".

On 5 April, April Benfica played at Estádio da Mata Real against Paços de Ferreira. With three goals in the first half-hour, Benfica secured the lead until the end to gain three points in a 3–1 win. With the league on international break, Benfica played two friendlies abroad; one against Luxembourg's F91 Dudelange and another against Paris Saint-Germain. They resumed their league campaign on 21 April, hosting home games at the Estádio Nacional in Oeiras where they met Varzim. Benfica won 2–1; and according to António Magalhães writing for Record, they "wasted a excessive number of opportunities to score". On the following Saturday, Benfica played away to Braga at the Estádio Primeiro de Maio. By winning 3–1, they opened an 11-point gap above third-place Sporting.

"Even with adversities on the bench, Benfica attained the great objective of the season; the return to European competitions through the big door – the UEFA Champions League. Against a superior Porto, and with the bizarre elimination at home in the Taça de Portugal, Benfica soon focus on the battle for the second place against Sporting. With three match days to go, the established goal is secured..."

— Rui Miguel Tovar on the season events

On 3 May, Benfica met Sporting for the second Lisbon derby of the season. In the words of António Tadeia, the visitors took on an approach of "ignoring the midfield ... and abusing of the long ball", inflicting a 1–2 loss upon Benfica. A week later, Benfica defeated Belenenses in Restelo, securing the second place in the league with a 4–2 victory and the associated berth to the third qualifying round of the 2003–04 UEFA Champions League. On 18 May, Benfica played Boavista at home. Camacho changed several players of the starting eleven, but the match ended in a 1–1 draw. Benfica closed the month with a 2–0 away win against Gil Vicente in Adelino Ribeiro Novo; Rui Dias wrote that Benfica showed "professionalism, despite having nothing to fight for".

Benfica played their last game of the season on 1 June at home against Vitória Guimarães, winning 4–0; Féher scored a hat-trick. Benfica finished in second place after the 34-game season with 23 wins, six draws and five losses for a total of 75 points. They scored 74 goals, the most in the league, and conceded 27, the second-lowest league-wide. Simão was the joint highest scorer in the Primeira Liga, with 18 goals, equal to Beira-Mar's Faye Fary; the latter took the Bola de Prata award due to having played fewer games.

== Competitions ==
Win Draw Loss Postponed

=== Overall record ===
Competition	First match	Last match	Record								
Competition	First match	Last match	G	W	D	L	GF	GA	GD	Win %	Source
Primeira Liga	24 August 2002	1 June 2003	34	23	6	5	74	27	+47	67.65	
Taça de Portugal	24 November 2002	24 November 2002	1	0	0	1	0	1	−1	0.00	
Total			35	23	6	6	74	28	+46	65.71	

=== Primeira Liga ===
==== League table ====
Pos	Team	Pld	W	D	L	GF	GA	GD	Pts	Qualification or relegation
1	Porto (C)	34	27	5	2	73	26	+47	86	Qualification to Champions League group stage
2	Benfica	34	23	6	5	74	27	+47	75	Qualification to Champions League third qualifying round
3	Sporting CP	34	17	8	9	52	38	+14	59	Qualification to UEFA Cup first round
4	Vitória de Guimarães	34	14	8	12	47	46	+1	50	
5	União de Leiria	34	13	10	11	49	47	+2	49	Qualification to UEFA Cup qualifying round (Note: Leiria qualified for the UEFA Cup as Portuguese Cup runners-up)

Source: Primeira Liga
Rules for classification: 1) points; 2) head-to-head points; 3) head-to-head goal difference; 4) goal difference; 5) number of goals scored
(C) Champions

==== Results by round ====
Round	1	2	3	4	5	6	7	8	9	10	11	12	13	14	15	16	17	18	19	20	21	22	23	24	25	26	27	28	29	30	31	32	33	34
Ground	H	A	A	H	A	H	A	H	A	H	A	H	A	H	A	H	A	A	H	H	A	H	A	H	A	H	A	H	A	H	A	H	A	H
Result	W	W	W	W	L	D	L	D	W	W	L	W	W	W	D	W	D	W	W	D	W	W	W	L	W	W	W	W	W	L	W	D	W	W
Position	1	1	1	1	2	2	3	5	3	2	3	3	2	2	2	2	2	2	2	2	2	2	2	2	2	2	2	2	2	2	2	2	2	2

Source: FootballPortugal
A = Away; H = Home; W = Win; D = Draw; L = Loss

==== Matches ====
24 August 2002 1	Benfica	3–0	Maritimo	Lisbon
21:15	Zahovič 35'; Tiago 43'; Simão 80' (pen.)	Report	Ezequias (red card) 79'	Stadium: Estádio da Luz; Referee: António Costa

31 August 2002 2	Beira Mar	0–2	Benfica	Aveiro
21:15		Report	Argel 8'; Simão 92' (pen.)	Stadium: Estádio Mário Duarte; Referee: Paulo Costa

14 September 2002 3	Moreirense	2–3	Benfica	Braga
18:00	Demétrius 16'; Armando Silva 42'; João Duarte (yellow card) 45' (yellow-red card) 66'	Report	Nuno Gomes 3'; Simão 67' (pen.); Fehér 78'	Stadium: Estádio 1º de Maio; Referee: João Ferreira

21 September 2002 4	Benfica	3–1	União Leiria	Lisbon
21:00	Nuno Gomes 23'; Simão 55' (pen.), 88'	Report	Márcio Mixirica 41'; Renato (yellow card) 27' (yellow-red card) 51'	Stadium: Estádio da Luz; Referee: Isidoro Rodrigues

28 September 2002 5	Nacional	1–0	Benfica	Funchal
21:00	Serginho 62'	Report		Stadium: Estádio da Madeira; Referee: Olegário Benquerença

5 October 2002 6	Benfica	1–1	Vitória Setúbal	Lisbon
21:00	Petit 71'	Report	Jorginho 85'	Stadium: Estádio da Luz; Attendance: 35,500; Referee: Paulo Baptista

20 October 2002 7	Porto	2–1	Benfica	Porto
21:15	Éder Bonfim 20' (o.g.); Jorge Costa (yellow card) 25' (yellow-red card) 39'; Deco 71'	Report	Tiago 4'; Éder Bonfim (yellow card) 60' (yellow-red card) 71'; Miguel (yellow card) 74' (yellow-red card) 75'	Stadium: Estádio das Antas; Attendance: 47,000; Referee: Paulo Costa

26 October 2002 8	Benfica	1–1	Académica	Lisbon
18:00	Fehér (red card) 89'; Carlitos 90'	Report	Xano 86'	Stadium: Estádio da Luz; Referee: Paulo Pereira

3 November 2002 9	Santa Clara	1–2	Benfica	Ponta Delgada
19:00	João Pedro 14'	Report	Simão 42', 71'	Stadium: Estádio de São Miguel; Attendance: 14,000; Referee: Jacinto Paixão

10 November 2002 10	Benfica	7–0	Paços de Ferreira	Lisbon
19:00	Tiago 18', 42'; Roger 30'; Nuno Gomes 60'; João Manuel Pinto 70'; Mantorras 77', 90+5'	Report		Stadium: Estádio da Luz; Attendance: 40,000; Referee: Martins dos Santos

16 November 2002 11	Varzim	2–1	Benfica	Póvoa de Varzim
20:30	Gilmar 37'; Quim Berto 57' (pen.)	Report	Simão 39' (pen.) (yellow card) 13' (yellow-red card) 59'	Stadium: Estádio do Varzim Sport Club; Referee: Lucílio Baptista

30 November 2002 12	Benfica	3–0	Braga	Lisbon
17:00	Tiago 18'; Mantorras 40'; Simão 78'	Report		Stadium: Estádio da Luz; Referee: Paulo Baptista

4 December 2002 16	Benfica	3–1	Gil Vicente	Lisbon
19:00	Nuno Gomes 20'; Tiago 34'; Petit 89'	Report	Duah 11'; Rui Guerreiro (yellow card) 16' (yellow-red card) 33'	Stadium: Estádio da Luz; Referee: Elmano Santos

7 December 2002 13	Sporting	0–2	Benfica	Lisbon
21:30	Quaresma (red card) 63'	Report	Zahovič 15'; Tiago 42'; Petit (yellow card) 55' (yellow-red card) 63'	Stadium: Estádio de Alvalade; Referee: Paulo Paraty

14 December 2002 14	Benfica	1–0	Belenenses	Lisbon
19:30	Simão 55' (pen.)	Report	Ludemar (yellow card) 27' (yellow-red card) 36'; Marco Paulo (yellow card) 53' (yellow-red card) 55'	Stadium: Estádio da Luz; Referee: Bruno Paixão

21 December 2002 15	Boavista	0–0	Benfica	Porto
20:45		Report		Stadium: Estádio do Bessa; Attendance: 10,000; Referee: António Costa

11 January 2003 17	Vitória Guimarães	1–1	Benfica	Felgueiras
19:00	Adriano Bessa 49'	Report	Zahovič 59'	Stadium: Dr. Machado de Matos; Attendance: 7,000; Referee: João Ferreira

18 January 2003 18	Maritimo	1–2	Benfica	Funchal
21:15	Van der Gaag 59'	Report	Hélder 55'; Nuno Gomes 74'	Stadium: Estádio dos Barreiros; Attendance: 10,000; Referee: Paulo Costa

26 January 2003 19	Benfica	1–0	Beira Mar	Torres Novas
19:30	Geovanni 56'	Report		Stadium: Municipal Dr. Alves Vieira; Attendance: 10,000; Referee: Lucílio Baptista

3 February 2003 20	Benfica	1–1	Moreirense	Lisbon
20:30	Simão 79'	Report	Agostinho 56'	Stadium: Estádio da Luz; Attendance: 10,000; Referee: Elmano Santos

8 February 2003 21	União Leiria	0–3	Benfica	Marinha Grande
20:30		Report	Nuno Gomes 14'; Tiago 44', 53'	Stadium: Estádio Municipal da Marinha Grande; Attendance: 8,000; Referee: Pedro Proença

16 February 2003 22	Benfica	2–0	Nacional	Lisbon
20:00	Zahovič 24', 28'	Report		Stadium: Estádio da Luz; Attendance: 22,000; Referee: Jorge Sousa

22 February 2003 23	Vitória Setúbal	2–6	Benfica	Setúbal
20:00	Pascal 18'; Rui Miguel 23'	Report	Simão 44', 70' (pen.), 90+4'; Carlos 61' (o.g.); Tiago 63'; Šokota 80'	Stadium: Estádio do Bonfim; Attendance: 10,000; Referee: Mário Mendes

4 March 2003 24	Benfica	0–1	Porto	Lisbon
21:00	Ricardo Rocha (red card) 70'	Report	Deco 36'	Stadium: Estádio da Luz; Attendance: 54,000; Referee: António Costa

15 March 2003 25	Académica	1–4	Benfica	Figueira da Foz
20:30	Dário 55'	Report	Armando Sá 11'; Simão 18'; Miguel 45'; João Manuel Pinto 90'	Stadium: Estádio Municipal José Bento Pessoa; Referee: Paulo Paraty

22 March 2003 26	Benfica	1–0	Santa Clara	Lisbon
19:00	Simão 62' (pen.)	Report		Stadium: Estádio da Luz; Attendance: 55,000; Referee: Olegário Benquerença

5 April 2003 27	Paços de Ferreira	1–3	Benfica	Paços de Ferreira
20:30	Renato Queirós 39'; Cadú (red card) 65'; Beto (red card) 79'	Report	Nuno Gomes 10', 28'; Simão 20' (pen.); Hélder (yellow card) 3' (yellow-red card) 76'	Stadium: Estádio da Mata Real; Attendance: 5,200; Referee: Paulo Baptista

21 April 2003 28	Benfica	2–1	Varzim	Lisbon
19:00	Argel 42'; Tiago 66'; Petit (yellow card) 73' (yellow-red card) 73'	Report	Rui Baião 55'	Stadium: Estádio Nacional; Referee: Carlos Xistra

26 April 2003 29	Braga	1–3	Benfica	Braga
20:30	Barroso 11'	Report	Geovanni 6'; Zahovič 24'; Nuno Gomes 64'	Stadium: Estádio Primeiro de Maio; Attendance: 10,000; Referee: Paulo Costa

3 May 2003 30	Benfica	1–2	Sporting	Lisbon
20:00	Šokota 73'; Zahovič (red card) 78'	Report	Ricardo Quaresma 10'; João Vieira Pinto 33' (red card) 78'	Stadium: Estádio Nacional; Attendance: 24,000; Referee: António Costa

10 May 2003 31	Belenenses	2–4	Benfica	Lisbon
20:30	Verona 44'; Antchouet 77'	Report	Hélder 17'; Geovanni 19'; Šokota 56'; Tiago 66' (yellow card) 49' (yellow-red card) 83'	Stadium: Estádio do Restelo; Attendance: 12,000; Referee: Elmano Santos

18 May 2003 32	Benfica	1–1	Boavista	Lisbon
20:00	Šokota 38'	Report	Pedrosa 33'	Stadium: Estádio Nacional; Referee: João Vilas Boas

25 May 2003 33	Gil Vicente	0–2	Benfica	Barcelos
20:30		Report	Simão 41'; Roger 59'	Stadium: Estádio Adelino Ribeiro Novo; Attendance: 8,000; Referee: Pedro Henriques

1 June 2003 34	Benfica	4–0	Vitória Guimarães	Lisbon
20:00	Fehér 15', 43', 76'; Tiago 41'		Cléber (yellow card) 47' (yellow-red card) 23'	Stadium: Estádio Nacional; Attendance: 10,000; Referee: Martins dos Santos

=== Taça de Portugal ===
24 November 2002 Fourth Rd	Benfica	0–1	Gondomar	Lisbon
18:00		Report	Cilio 10'; Paulinho (yellow card) 72' (yellow-red card) 81'	Stadium: Estádio da Luz; Referee: António Taia

=== Friendlies ===
14 July 2002	Étoile Carouge	0–1	Benfica	Geneva, Switzerland
19:30 CET (UTC+01)		Report	Anderson Luiz 83'	Stadium: Stade de Genève

18 July 2002	Auxerre	0–0	Benfica	Yverdon, Switzerland
19:30 CET (UTC+01)		Report		Stadium: Stade Municipal; Referee: Nicole Petignat

21 July 2002	Inter Milan	0–0	Benfica	Palermo, Italy
19:30 CET (UTC+01)		Report		Stadium: Stadio Renzo Barbera

28 July 2002 Superbola	Sporting	0–0	Benfica	Lisbon, Portugal
19:30 CET (UTC+01)		Report		Stadium: Estádio de Alvalade; Attendance: 12,000

3 August 2002	Benfica	1–1	Grémio	Lisbon, Portugal
19:30 CET (UTC+01)	Zahovič 18' (pen.)	Report	Luís Mário 6'	Stadium: Estádio da Luz; Attendance: 50,000

7 August 2002 Guadiana Trophy	Benfica	2–1	Vitória de Setúbal	Vila Real Santo António, Portugal
19:30 CET (UTC+01)	Roger 25', 47'		Meyong 86'	Stadium: Complexo Desportivo de Vila Real Santo António, Attendance: 15,000

10 August 2002	Benfica	0–2	Celta de Vigo	Vila do Conde, Portugal
19:30 CET (UTC+01)		Report	Kaviedes 69'; Cáceres 90'	Stadium: Estádio do Rio Ave FC

17 August 2002	Benfica	2–3	Real Madrid	Lisbon, Portugal
19:30 CET (UTC+01)	Zahovič 6'; Argel 45'	Report	Figo 11'; Miñambres 60'; Portillo 81'	Stadium: Estádio da Luz; Referee: Vítor Pereira

23 January 2003	Benfica	1–1	Ajax	Lisbon, Portugal
19:30 CET (UTC+01)	Ricardo Rocha 71'	Report	Ibrahimović 87'	Stadium: Estádio da Luz

29 January 2003	Benfica	0–1	Barcelona	Lisbon, Portugal
19:30 CET (UTC+01)		Report	Mendieta 6'	Stadium: Estádio da Luz

12 April 2003	Dudelange	0–1	Benfica	Dudelange, Luxembourg
19:30 CET (UTC+01)		Report	Šokota 2'	Stadium: Stade Jos Nosbaum

15 April 2003	Paris Saint-Germain	1–1 (6–5 p)	Benfica	Paris, France
19:30 CET (UTC+01)	Alioune Touré 11'	Report	Zahovič 17'	Stadium: Parc des Princes

== Player statistics ==
The squad for the season consisted of the players listed in the tables below, as well as managers Jesualdo Ferreira and José António Camacho. Ljubinko Drulović took over the captaincy from Robert Enke.

Note 1: Note: Flags indicate national team as defined under FIFA eligibility rules. Players may hold more than one non-FIFA nationality.

Note 2: Players with squad numbers marked ‡ joined the club during the 2002–03 season via transfer, with more details in the following section.

No.	Pos	Nat	Player	Total		Primeira Liga		Taça de Portugal	
No.	Pos	Nat	Player	Apps	Goals	Apps	Goals	Apps	Goals
1	GK	(Portugal) POR	José Moreira	31	-26	31	-26	0	0
2	DF	(Mozambique) MOZ	Armando Sá	16	1	15	1	1	0
3	DF	(Brazil) BRA	Argel	28	2	28	2	0	0
4	DF	(Portugal) POR	Paulo Cabral	4	0	3	0	1	0
5^{‡}	DF	(Brazil) BRA	Cristiano Roland	14	0	14	0	0	0
6^{‡}	MF	(Portugal) POR	Emílio Peixe	2	0	2	0	0	0
7	MF	(Sweden) SWE	Anders Andersson	17	0	16	0	1	0
8	MF	(Brazil) BRA	Roger	14	2	13	2	1	0
9	FW	(Angola) ANG	Mantorras	10	3	9	3	1	0
10	MF	(Slovenia) SLO	Zahovič	30	6	29	6	1	0
11	MF	(Serbia and Montenegro) SCG	Ljubinko Drulović	20	0	19	0	1	0
12	GK	(Argentina) ARG	Carlos Bossio	3	-1	3	-1	0	0
14	MF	(Portugal) POR	Ednilson	8	0	8	0	0	0
15^{‡}	MF	(Brazil) BRA	Geovanni	17	3	17	3	0	0
16	DF	(Portugal) POR	João Manuel Pinto	23	2	22	2	1	0
18	MF	(Portugal) POR	Carlitos	8	1	8	1	0	0
20	MF	(Portugal) POR	Simão Sabrosa	33	18	33	18	0	0
21^{‡}	FW	(Portugal) POR	Nuno Gomes	29	9	28	9	1	0
22	MF	(Portugal) POR	Luís Andrade	8	0	7	0	1	0
23	DF	(Portugal) POR	Miguel Monteiro	29	1	29	1	0	0
24	GK	(Portugal) POR	Nuno Santos	1	-1	0	0	1	-1
25	FW	(Croatia) CRO	Šokota	13	4	13	4	0	0
26^{‡}	MF	(Portugal) POR	Petit	26	2	25	2	1	0
27^{‡}	DF	(Brazil) BRA	Éder Bonfim	5	0	5	0	0	0
29^{‡}	FW	(Hungary) HUN	Fehér	18	4	17	4	1	0
30	MF	(Portugal) POR	Tiago Mendes	31	13	31	13	0	0
32^{‡}	DF	(Portugal) POR	Hélder Cristóvão	23	2	22	2	1	0
33^{‡}	DF	(Portugal) POR	Ricardo Rocha	27	0	27	0	0	0
39	MF	(Portugal) POR	Hélio Pinto	0	0	0	0	0	0
55	DF	(Portugal) POR	Eduardo Simões	1	0	1	0	0	0

== Transfers ==
=== In ===
Entry date	Position	Player	From club	Fee	Ref
12 June 2002	FW	Anderson Luiz	Alverca	Undisclosed	
1 July 2002	CB	Ricardo Rocha	Braga	Undisclosed	
1 July 2002	CM	Emílio Peixe	Porto	Free	
11 July 2002	FW	Fehér	Porto	Free	
18 July 2002	LB	Cristiano Roland	Beira-Mar	Undisclosed	
20 July 2002	DM	Petit	Boavista	Undisclosed	
24 July 2002	CB	Hélder Cristóvão	Deportivo de La Coruña	Free	
3 August 2002	FW	Nuno Gomes	Free agent	Free	

=== In by loan ===
Date from	Position	Player	To club	Date to	Ref
11 July 2002	RB	Éder Bonfim	Grêmio Inhumense	30 June 2003	
8 January 2003	RW	Geovanni	Barcelona	30 June 2003	

=== Out ===
Exit date	Position	Player	To club	Fee	Ref
16 May 2002	LB	Júlio César	Real Madrid	Loan end	
16 May 2002	LB	Emanuele Pesaresi	Lazio	Loan end	
29 May 2002	CM	Maniche	Porto	Free	
1 June 2002	ST	Edgaras Jankauskas	Real Sociedad	Loan end	
4 June 2002	GK	Robert Enke	Barcelona	Free	
13 June 2002	DM	Ricardo Esteves	Nacional	Free	
20 June 2002	GK	Paulo Lopes	Salgueiros	Free	
23 June 2002	CB	Marco Caneira	Inter Milan	Loan end	
18 July 2002	RB	Toni	Beira-Mar	Free	
18 July 2002	LB	Diogo Luís	Beira-Mar	Free	
10 July 2002	FB	Quim Berto	Varzim	Free	
10 July 2002	LB	Jorge Ribeiro	Varzim	Free	
10 July 2002	FW	Pepa	Varzim	Free	
10 July 2002	CM	Rui Baião	Varzim	Free	
23 September 2002	DM	Paulo Madeira	Fluminense	Free	

=== Out by loan ===
Date from	Position	Player	To club	Date to	Ref
28 July 2002	CM	Bruno Aguiar	Alverca	30 June 2003	
2 August 2002	CB	Geraldo Alves	Gil Vicente	30 June 2003	
14 August 2002	DM	Fernando Aguiar	Leiria	30 June 2003	
14 August 2002	RB	Ivan Dudić	Rad	30 June 2003	
29 August 2002	FW	Anderson Luiz	Moreirense	30 June 2003	
21 January 2003	RB	Éder Bonfim	Estrela da Amadora	30 June 2003	
1 February 2003	ST	André Neles	Internacional	31 December 2003	
