= Aleixandre =

Aleixandre is a surname. Notable people with the surname include:

- Concepción Aleixandre (1862–1952), Spanish scientist, inventor, and writer
- Marilar Aleixandre (born 1947), Spanish writer, translator, and biologist
- Vicente Aleixandre (1898–1984), Spanish poet

== See also ==
- Alexandre (surname)
