= Alexandre =

Alexandre may refer to:

- Alexandre (given name)
- Alexandre (surname)
- Alexandre (film)

== See also ==
- Alexander
- Alexandra (disambiguation)
- Xano (disambiguation), a Portuguese hypocoristic of the name "Alexandre"
