= Jean Alexandre =

Jean Alexandre may refer to:

- Jean Alexandre (footballer) (born 1986), Haitian footballer
- Jean C. Alexandre (born 1942), Haitian diplomat
- Jean Alexandre (cyclist) (1917–?), Belgian Olympic cyclist

== See also ==
- Jean Alexander, English actress
