= Xandão =

Xandão is a hypocorism of the name Alexandre, and means "Big Alexander" or "Alexander Sr." in Portuguese. Xandão may refer to:

- Alexandre de Moraes, Brazilian jurist and a judge at the Brazilian Supreme Federal Court
- Xandão (footballer, born 1988), Brazilian football defender Alexandre Luiz Reame
- Xandão (footballer, born 1990), Brazilian football defender Alexandre Rodrigues Soares
- Xandão Menezes, Brazilian guitarist
