= PS Alexandra =

Alexandra was the name of the following paddle steamers:

- PS Alexandra (1863), operated on Holyhead–Dublin service by the London and North Western Railway 1863–1889
- PS Alexandra (1863 Caird), on Newhaven–Dieppe service with the London, Brighton & South Coast Railway 1863–1883
- PS Alexandra (1864), operated on Folkestone–Boulogne service by the South Eastern Railway 1864–1889
- PS Alexandra (1879), on Portsmouth–Isle of Wight service with London & South Western Railway and London, Brighton & South Coast Railway jointly 1879–1913, then Cosens & Co 1915–1931

== See also ==
- Alexandra (disambiguation)
