= Alexander Park =

Alexander Park may refer to:

- Alexander Park (Saint Petersburg), a park in Saint Petersburg, Russia
- Alexander Park (Tsarskoye Selo), a park in Tsarskoye Selo, Russia
- Alexander Park (Columbus, Ohio), United States
- Alexander Park (merchant), 16th-century Scottish merchant
- Alexander Park (politician) (1808–1873), Australian politician

== See also ==
- Viscount Alexander Park, a neighbourhood in Ottawa, Ontario, Canada
- Alexander Parker (disambiguation)
- Alexander Parkes (1813–1890), English metallurgist
- Alexandra Park (disambiguation)
- Alex Parks (born 1984), English singer-songwriter
- Alexander Garden
