= Alexandra Bridge (disambiguation) =

Alexandra Bridge is a bridge over the Ottawa River between Gatineau and Ottawa, Canada.

Alexandra Bridge may refer to:

== Bridges ==
- Alexandra Bridge (Trans-Canada), over the Fraser River near Spuzzum, British Columbia, Canada
  - Two earlier bridges in Alexandra Bridge Provincial Park
- Alexandra bridges, the old and new bridges over the Clutha River in Alexandra, New Zealand
- Alexandra Railway Bridge, over the Fitzroy River in Rockhampton, Queensland, Australia

== Places ==
- Alexandra Bridge, Western Australia

== See also ==
- Queen Alexandra Bridge, in Sunderland, England, United Kingdom
