= Alexandre (surname) =

Alexandre is a French, Portuguese and Spanish surname. Alexandre means warrior or defending men. Notable people with the surname include:

- Aaron Alexandre (c.1765–1850), German-born French-English chess player and writer
- Caio Alexandre (born 1999), Brazilian footballer
- Guy Alexandre (1945–2014), Haitian diplomat
- Jean Alexandre (footballer) (born 1986), Haitian footballer
- Jean C-Alexandre (1942–2023), Haitian doctor and diplomat
- Kathryn Alexandre (born 1990), Canadian actress
- Laurent Alexandre (born 1972), French politician
- Manuel Alexandre (1917–2010), a Spanish actor
- Marcelo Alexandre (born 1963), Argentine cyclist
- Maria Eduarda Alexandre (born 2007), Brazilian rhythmic gymnast
- Matheus Alexandre (born 1999), Brazilian footballer
- Maxime Alexandre (born 1971), Belgian-Italian cinematographer
- Rodolphe Alexandre (born 1953), French politician
- Noël Alexandre (1639–1724), French theologian, author, and ecclesiastical historian
- Solange Alexandre (1922–2026), French World War II resistance fighter
