= The Alexandra =

The Alexandra may refer to:

- The Alexandra, Birmingham, a theatre in Birmingham, England
- The Alexandra, Edgeley, a pub in Stockport, Greater Manchester, England
- The Alexandra, New Barnet, a demolished pub in London
- The Alexandra (Indianapolis, Indiana), a historic apartment building in the United States listed on the National Register of Historic Places (NRHP)
- The Alexandra (Cincinnati, Ohio), a historic apartment building in the United States listed on the NRHP

== See also ==
- Alexandra (disambiguation)
- The Alexander, a building in Philadelphia, Pennsylvania, United States
