= Alexandra Blossom Festival =

Annual festival in Alexandra, New Zealand

Coordinates: 45.232912°S 169.373954°E

The Alexandra Blossom Festival is an annual event that is held for 17 days each September in Alexandra, New Zealand that celebrates the advent of Spring. The Festival is the longest-running community event of its kind in New Zealand.

== History ==
The first blossom festival began on Friday, 27 September 1957 and the first attraction was the Horticultural Society's spring flower show. The next day saw the climax of the festival, as the frequently termed "big day" was held then. It was then that the now famous parade of floats first took place and they showcased themselves by moving along the main street of Alexandra. There was also entertainment during and after the parade at Alexandra's Pioneer Park. From then on, the parade and other main event attractions would take place usually in the last week of September during the weekend. The parade is always held on the Saturday.

Alexandra's annual celebration of Spring is New Zealand's longest-running festival. The Alexandra Blossom Festival has raised many thousands of dollars to provide amenities for the town of Alexandra. This popular event encourages community spirit and attracts interest from all over the Country.

2006 marked the event's 50th anniversary.

== Activities and Exhibits ==
Typically the types of available activities and exhibits vary from year to year. However, activities usually include things such as shearing championships, music festivals, blossom drives, musical productions and much more. Exhibits range from art exhibitions to flower shows.

The most anticipated showing of the festival is the annual parade. Here a wide range of vehicles, objects, groups and people are on show including trucks, handmade floats, classic cars, street entertainers, marching bands and horse-driven vehicles.

The "Saturday in the Park" which follows at the conclusion of the parade includes entertainment & relaxation for local & visiting families. Attractions include carnival rides, children's Stage & circus entertainers, all age music concerts, stalls, food and beverage tents and interactive games such as rock climbing.

The year 2006 also saw the return of the "Party in the Park" concert. The concert was held at night in a Grand Marquee. Six bands from New Zealand played here, including the well known Elemeno P and Goodnight Nurse. The other bands were Minuit, Eggs, Solaa and Twinset.
