= Cílio Souza =

Brazilian footballer (born 1976)

Personal information
- Full name: Cílio André de Souza
- Date of birth: 15 April 1976 (age 50)
- Place of birth: Goiânia, Brazil
- Height: 1.85 m (6 ft 1 in)
- Position: Centre forward

Youth career
- 1989–1995: Goiás

Senior career*
Years	Team	Apps	(Gls)
1996	Atlético Goianiense		
1997	Guarani	0	(0)
1998	América Mineiro	5	(0)
1998–1999	Dinamo Tbilisi	?	(14)
1999–2002	Beira-Mar	42	(14)
2002	Rio Ave	8	(2)
2002–2003	Gondomar	33	(15)
2003–2004	Amora	19	(10)
2004	Barreirense	14	(8)
2004	Imortal		
2005	Terengganu	?	(2)
2005	Nelas	7	(2)
2005–2006	Operário	17	(3)
2006–2010	Nanjing Yoyo	77	(32)
2011	Shanghai East Asia	4	(0)
2012–2013	Oliveira Bairro	46	(15)
2013–2015	Gafanha	53	(12)
2015–2017	Beira-Mar	60	(40)
Total		380	(169)
- * Club domestic league appearances and goals

Cílio André de Souza (born 15 April 1976) is a Brazilian former footballer who played as a centre forward.

== Club career ==
Born in Goiânia, Goiás, Cílio spent most of his 21-year senior career in the Portuguese lower leagues and the China League One with Nanjing Yoyo FC. With S.C. Beira-Mar, which he represented in four different levels, he amassed Primeira Liga totals of 25 matches and one goal over one and a half seasons.

On 25 November 2002, Cílio scored the only goal to help Gondomar S.C. defeat hosts S.L. Benfica in the fourth round of the Taça de Portugal.
