= Armando Silva =

Colombian philosopher and semiotician

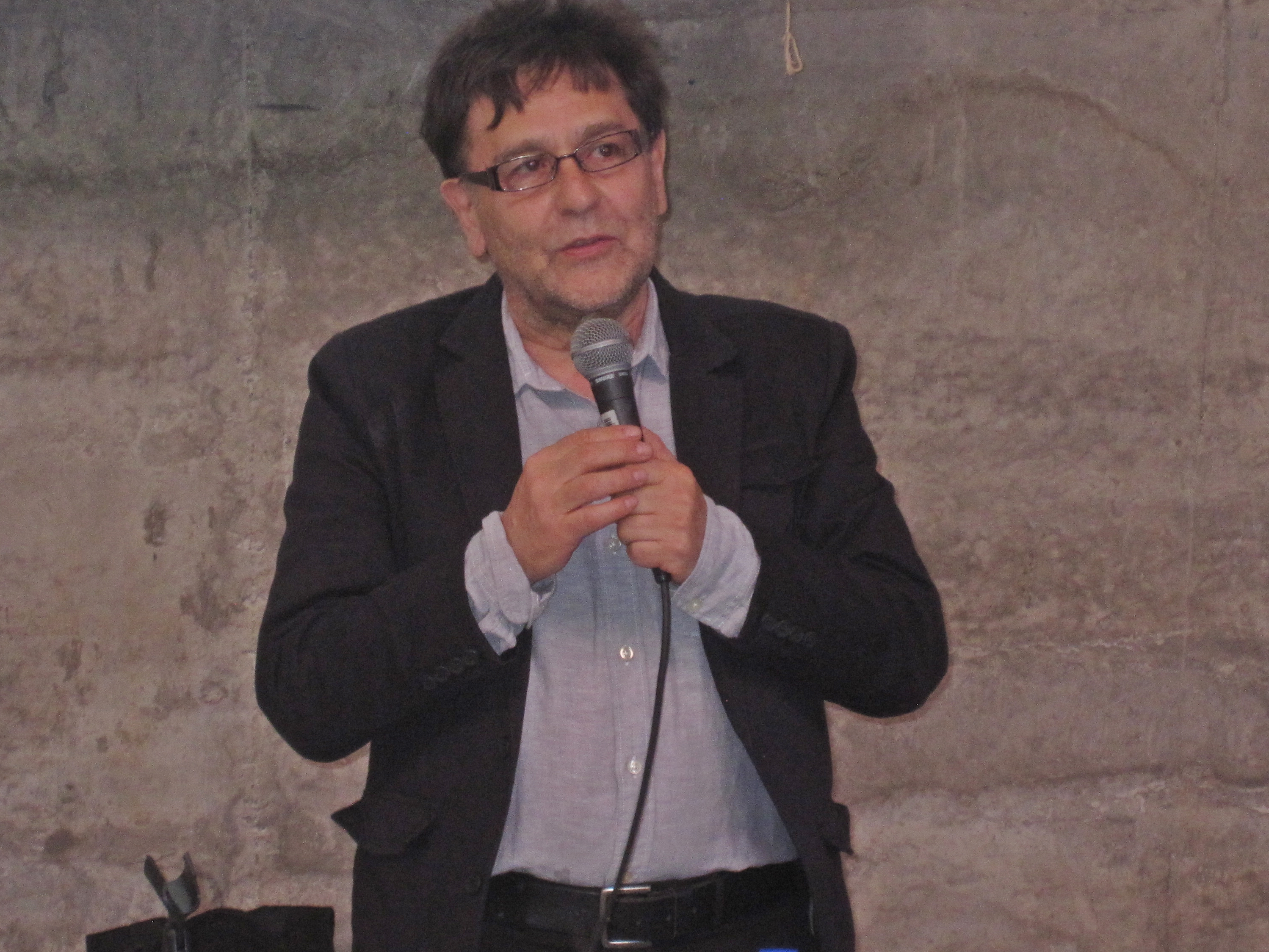
Armando Silva in 2019

Armando Silva (born August 19, 1948 in Bogotá) is a Colombian philosopher, semiotician and writer, who is best known for his work on Urban Imaginaries, which was developed in several cities in Latin America, Spain, the United States and other European cities.

== Biography ==
Silva holds a PhD in Philosophy and Comparative Literature and a post-doctorate in Critical Theory from the University of California, Irvine, under the supervision of Jacques Derrida. He also studied philosophy, aesthetics, and semiotics in Italy (Sapienza di Roma) under the supervision of Emilio Garroni and Umberto Eco. He also studied at École des Hautes Études en Sciences Sociales in Paris under the supervision of Christian Metz.

He has been a visiting professor at several universities, including the University of California, Cambridge University, and Universidad Internacional de Andalucía. Silva authored more than 25 books including Urban Imaginaries and Family Photo Album: The Image of Ourselves.. Urban Imaginaries has ten editions and is translated into several languages.

Throughout his research career, he has received distinctions from several universities and institutions such as UNESCO, FLACSO, and Documenta 11. He has also received distinction from The Venice Biennial and the São Paulo Biennial in Brazil. He is the director of the doctorate in Social Studies of the Universidad Externado de Colombia and a Professor and Researcher Emeritus of the Universidad Nacional de Colombia.

== Work ==
Silva's thoughts are based on the aesthetics of Garroni, the semiotics of Peirce, Freudian, and Lacanian psychoanalysis, and utilizes Derrida's deconstruction in the analysis of contemporary objects of everyday recognition such as photography, film, art, and graffiti. Today 35 cities in the world follow his methodology aimed at deciphering aspects of contemporary citizen aesthetics, which has become one of the most far-reaching projects worldwide in the study of contemporary urban cultures.

=== Selected works ===
- Graffiti. Una ciudad imaginada, Bogotá: Tercer Mundo Editores, 1986 and 1988.
- The Family Photo Album: the image of ourselves, Irvine: UMI USA, 1996.
- Imaginarios urbanos: hacia el desarrollo de un urbanismo desde los ciudadanos. Metodología, Bogotá: Convenio Andrés Bello and Universidad Nacional de Colombia, 2004
- Bogotá imaginada, Bogotá: Convenio Andrés Bello, and Buenos Aires, México and Madrid: Distribuidora Editora Aguilar, Altea, Taurus, Alfaguara, 2006
- Imaginarios urbanos, 5.ª ed., Bogotá: Arango Editores, 2006.
- Atmósferas ciudadanas: gráfiti, arte público, nichos estéticos, Bogotá, Universidad Externado de Colombia, 2015
