= Alexandra School =

Alexandra School may refer to:

== Australia ==
- Alexandra Hills State High School, Alexandra Hills, Queensland

== Azerbaijan ==
- Empress Alexandra Russian Muslim Boarding School for Girls, Baku

== Barbados ==
- The Alexandra School, Speighstown, St. Peter

== Canada ==
- Alexandra Junior High School (formerly Alexandra High School), Medicine Hat, Alberta
- Queen Alexandra Elementary School, Queen Alexandra, Edmonton, Alberta
- Queen Alexandra Elementary School, Vancouver, British Columbia
- Princess Alexandra Middle School, Hay River, Northwest Territories
- Alexandra School, a former school in the Waterloo Region, Ontario
- Princess Alexandra School, Riversdale, Saskatoon, Saskatchewan

== Republic of Ireland ==
- Alexandra College, Milltown, Dublin

== New Zealand ==
- Alexandra Primary School, Alexandra, New Zealand

== South Africa ==
- Alexandra High School, Pietermaritzburg, KwaZulu-Natal

== United Kingdom ==
- Alexandra Park Infants and Junior Schools, Edgeley, Stockport, Greater Manchester, England
- Alexandra School (originally in Watford), one of the predecessors of Queens' School, Bushey, Hertfordshire, England
- Alexandra Park School, Haringey, North London, England
- Alexandra Park School (merged), Haringey, North London, England merged in 1983 with Creighton School
- The Royal Alexandra and Albert School, Reigate, Surrey, England
- Alexandra High School, one of the predecessors of The ACE Academy, Tipton, West Midlands, England
- Alexandra Road School, one of the predecessors of Penglais School, Aberystwyth, Ceredigion, Wales

== See also ==
- Alexandria University, a public university in Egypt
