= Alexandra (wet fly) =

Fly fishing pattern

- Artificial fly
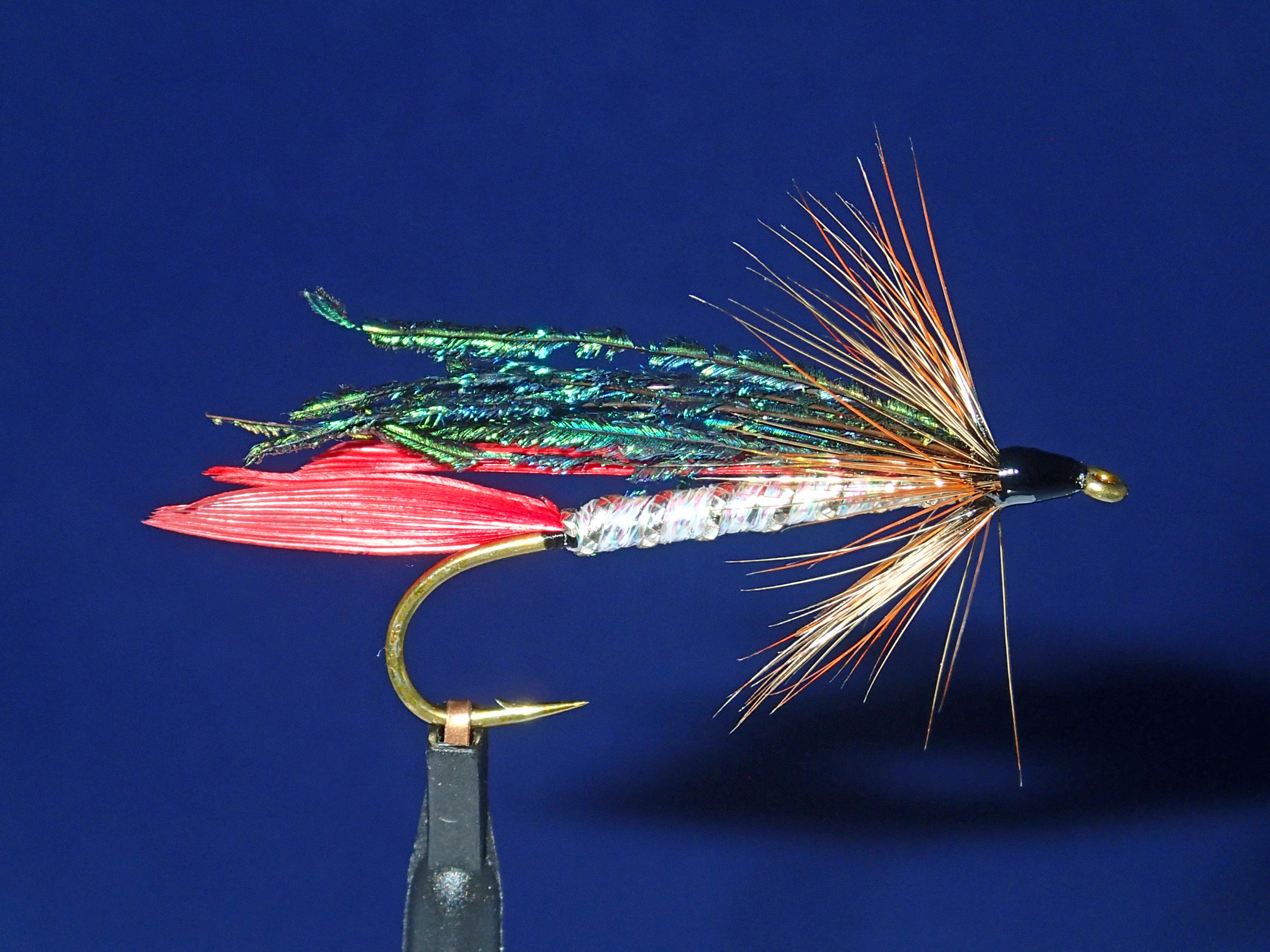
- Alexandra
- Type: Wet fly
- Imitates: Baitfish, attractor pattern

History
- Creator: Unknown of Scottish origin
- Created: 1860s, named by W.G. Turle
- Other names: Lady of the lake

Materials
- Typical sizes: 6–10
- Thread: Black 6/0 nylon
- Tail: Red ibis, swan or goose wing feather
- Body: Silver tinsel
- Wing: Six or more strands of peacock herl over red ibis, swan or goose wing feather
- Ribbing: Fine oval silver tinsel
- Hackle: Black or brown tied wet
- Head: Black thread

Uses
- Primary use: Trout, salmon lakes and rivers

Reference(s)
- Pattern references: Streamer Fly Tying and Fishing, (1966) Bates

The Alexandra wet fly is an artificial fly. Also known as the Lady of the Lake, the fly was named by English angler Major William Greer Turle to honour Alexandra, Princess of Wales. The fly is distinguished by the heavy peacock herl wing and silver body which makes the fly resemble a small baitfish or fry. The Alexandra proved to be a very effective fly for trout in lakes and streams in England and Scotland in the late 19th and early 20th century. Many fly fishing purists derided the fly and its use was once banned on many English waters.

== Origin ==
The Alexandra wet fly originated as the Lady of the Lake in the 1860s by an unknown angler, primarily for trout in lakes. The fly gained popularity because it was extremely effective when fished slowly on sinking lines. Anglers began using the fly in rivers for sea trout and Atlantic salmon with success. It was so effective, that it was allegedly banned from some waters. In the late 19th century, Major William Greer Turle (March 1839 – January 1909), a prominent English angler, renamed the fly Alexandra to honor Alexandra of Denmark, the daughter-in-law of Queen Victoria and then known as the Princess of Wales (1863 to 1901). Turle was a chalkstream angler with water on the River Test near Newton Stacey. He learned fly tying from George Selwyn Marryat and was a close associate of Frederic M. Halford.

== Imitates ==
The Alexandra is an attractor pattern most likely taken as a small baitfish or fry.

== Materials ==
The Alexandra is typically tied on a 2X/3X long streamer hook with black thread. A TMC 5262 2X long streamer hook would be typical. The tail is typically a few strands of red ibis or goose primary feather. The body is silver tinsel or mylar with an oval tinsel rib. A red floss tag is optional. The underwing is typically strips of red ibis or goose primary feather. The over wing, which distinguishes the Alexandra, is made of six to ten strands of peacock herl from peacock swords. The fly is hackled wet fly style with brown or black hen or cock hackle.

== Variations ==
Typical variations include the use of mottled turkey feather for the underwing, peacock herl for the tail and beads or cones for weight.

== Controversy ==
The "Alexandra", although a successful fly, was not always welcome on the chalk streams of Southern England.

Some anglers, especially the selfish ones, are in the habit of using a huge bunch of peacock herl for wings over a silver body, called the "Alexandra." What a profanation to bestow on this monstrosity the name of one of the most charming and amiable princesses of this century! It certainly is not the imitation of any indigenous insect known to entomologists; possibly the bright silver body moving through the river gives some idea of the gleam of a minnow. Long ere this its use should have been prohibited in every stream frequented by the bond fide fly-fisherman, as it is a dreadful scourge to any water, scratching and frightening an immense pro portion of the trout which are tempted to follow it. It certainly would have been prohibited, too, but for the fact that experience shows that in any stream in which it has been much fished the trout soon become quite alive to its danger, and not only will not move an inch towards it, but when worked close to their noses will not so much as turn at it, but at times, on the contrary, even fly in terror from the dread apparition.

— Frederic M. Halford, Dry Fly Fishing (1889)

Whether up-stream or down-stream fishing be the correct thing; whether gossamer casts are profitable in the long run; whether one, two or three flies should be used; whether the Alexandra fly is orthodox--these are amongst the topics the assembled fishermen discuss as they sit around on the spot to which the frugal luncheon has been brought, under shelter of the golden-blossomed gorse, their rods spiked hard by, and the flies streaming out before the breeze. If there are more than two present there is not likely to be unanimity upon any of these points. It is well for the tackle makers that new notions--heresies in the eyes of anglers of the last generation--are so freely promulgated. I know some successful fishermen who habitually fish down-stream, and who use medium gut for their casts. In very rapid water, free from weeds (the Derbyshire rivers, and Welsh streams, for example,) a third fly may be added to the stretcher and dropper, but, on the whole, little good comes of more than two flies on the cast. In trout water where the fish do not rise well at the usual flies the Alexandra is as much in place as a spun minnow, but it spoils the fish for the artificial fly pure and simple.

— William Senior, Angling In Great Britain (1883)

== Gallery ==
Examples of the Alexandra
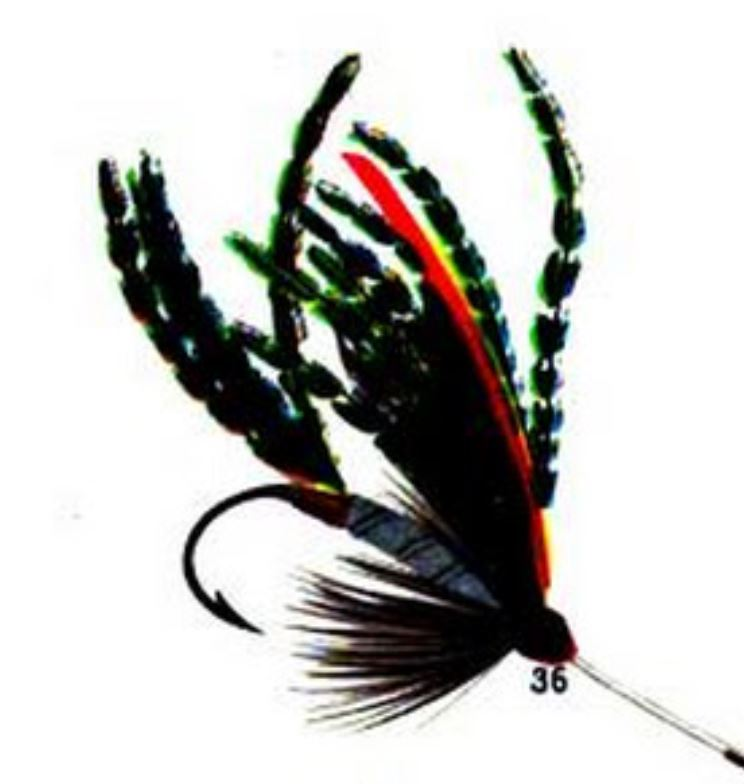
Alexandra from Favorite Flies and Their Histories (1894)

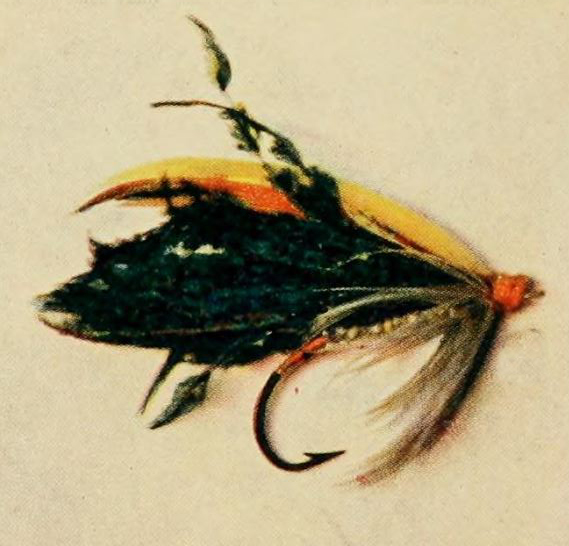
1904 Plate from Guns, Ammunition and Tackle

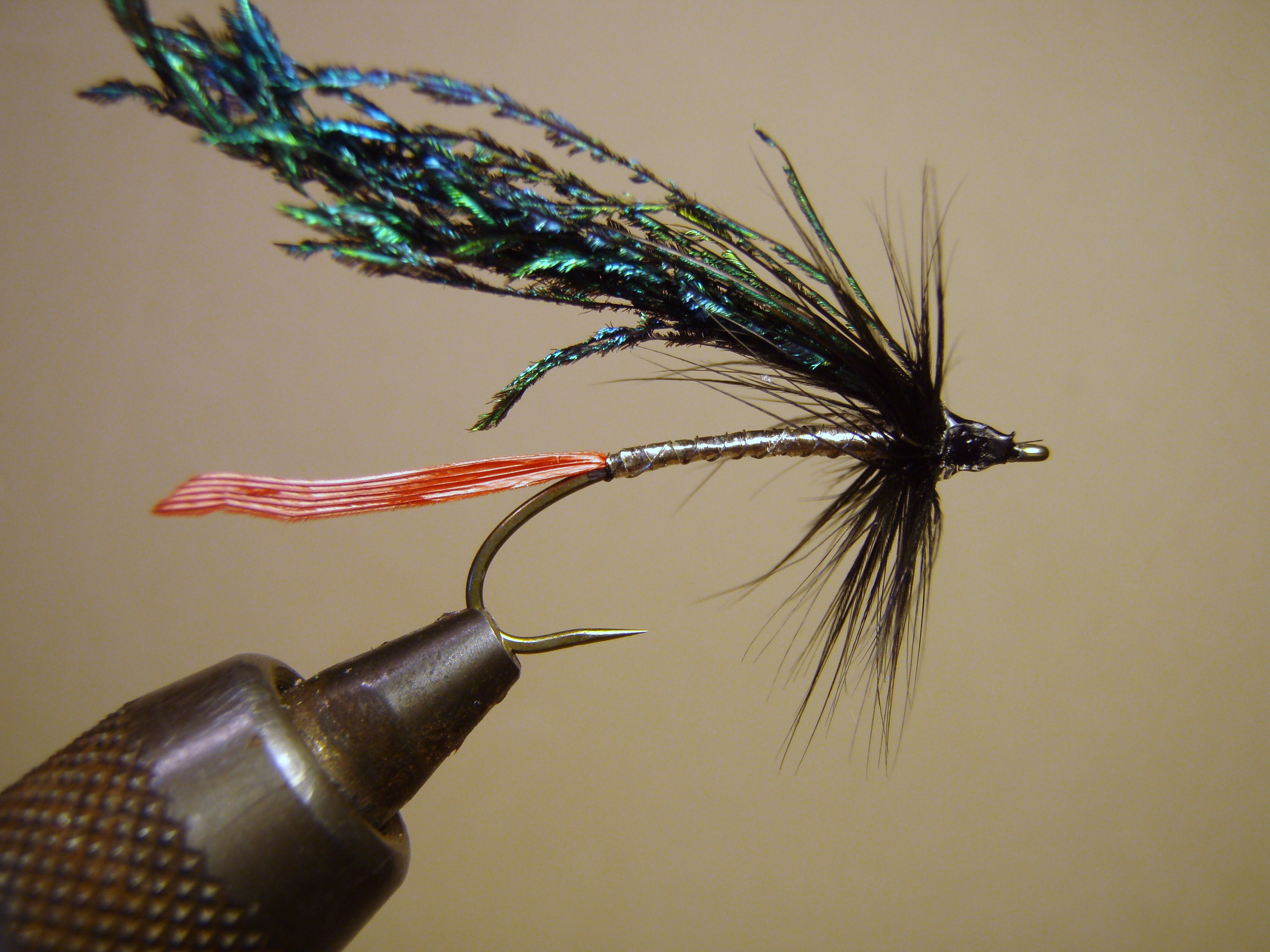
Alexandra based on Joseph Bates' pattern in Streamer Fly Tying and Fishing (1950)

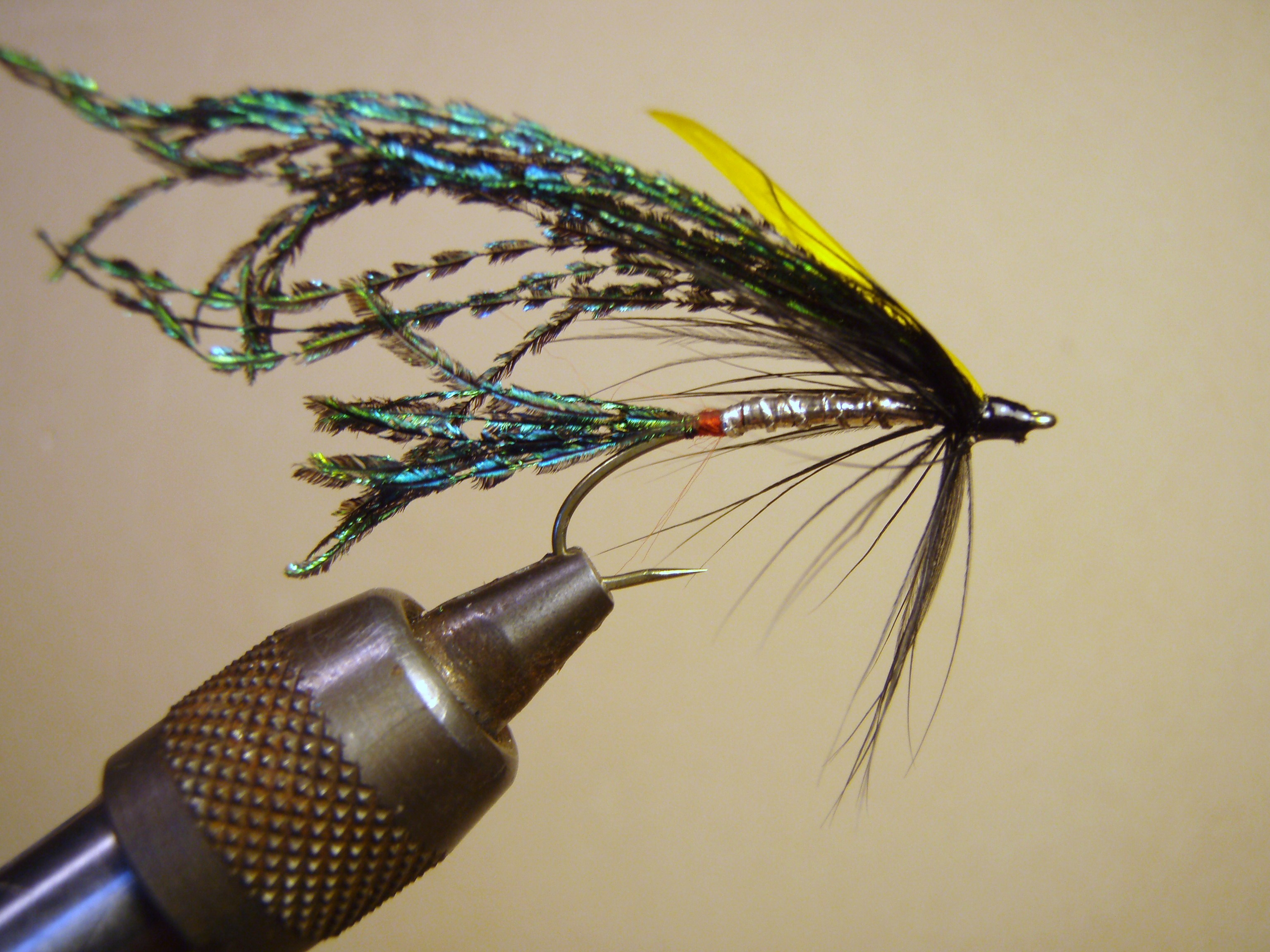
Alexandra variation by Mary Orvis Marbury
