= Alexandra (1905 automobile) =

The Alexandra was an English all-wooden bodied electric brougham made by the Phoenix Carriage Co of Birmingham from 1905 to 1906. It included a safety device found in hansom cabs to prevent passengers from falling out of the vehicle in the event of a sudden halt. The vehicle used a petrol engine. It is unknown how much, if any, success this model found.
