= Alexandra bridges =

Several bridges in Alexandra, New Zealand

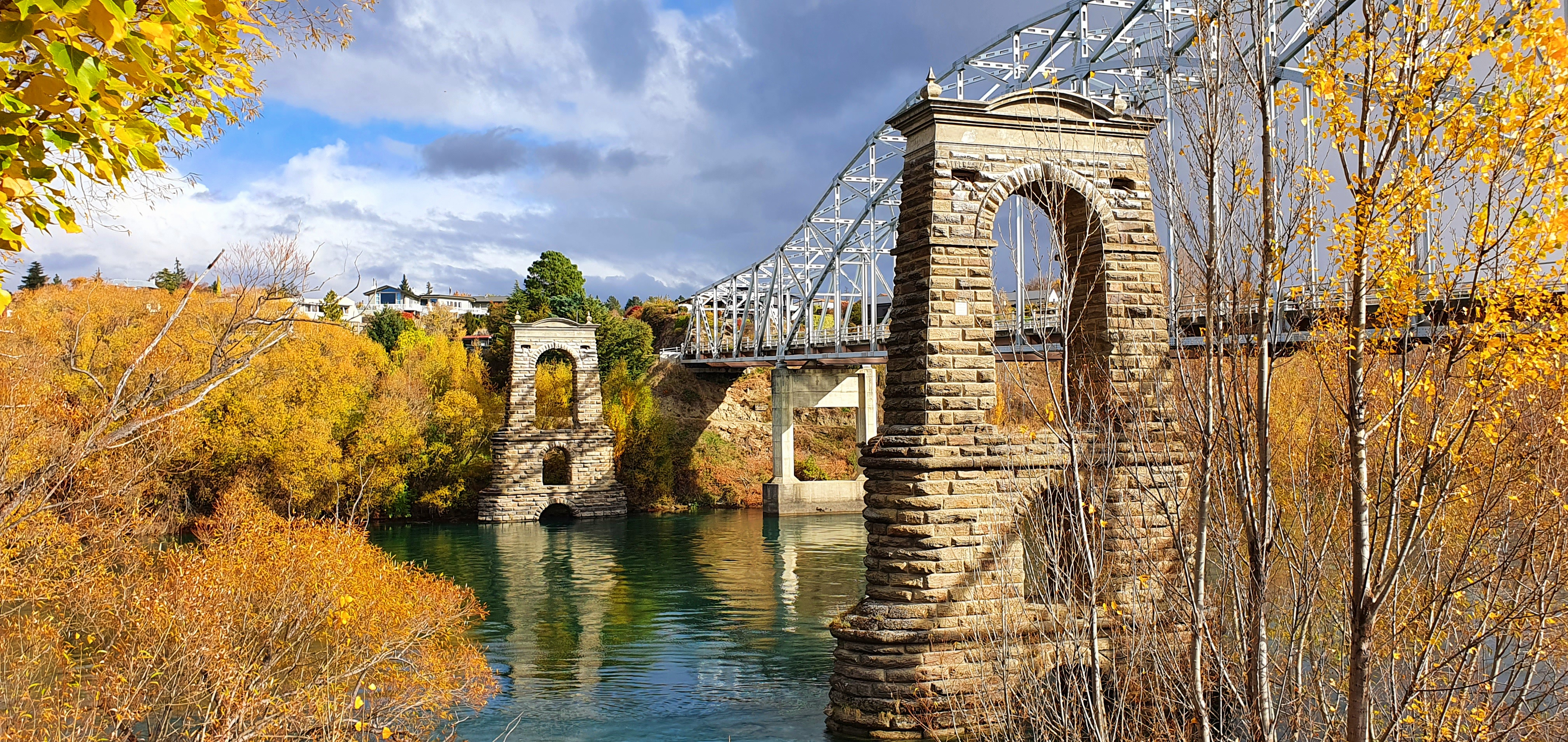
The Alexandra Bridge Towers

The Alexandra Bridges refers to the old and new bridges that cross the Clutha River in Alexandra, New Zealand. The bridges are situated at the confluence of the Clutha River/Mata-au River and Manuherikia River.

== Old Alexandra bridge ==
Alexandra bridge (old)
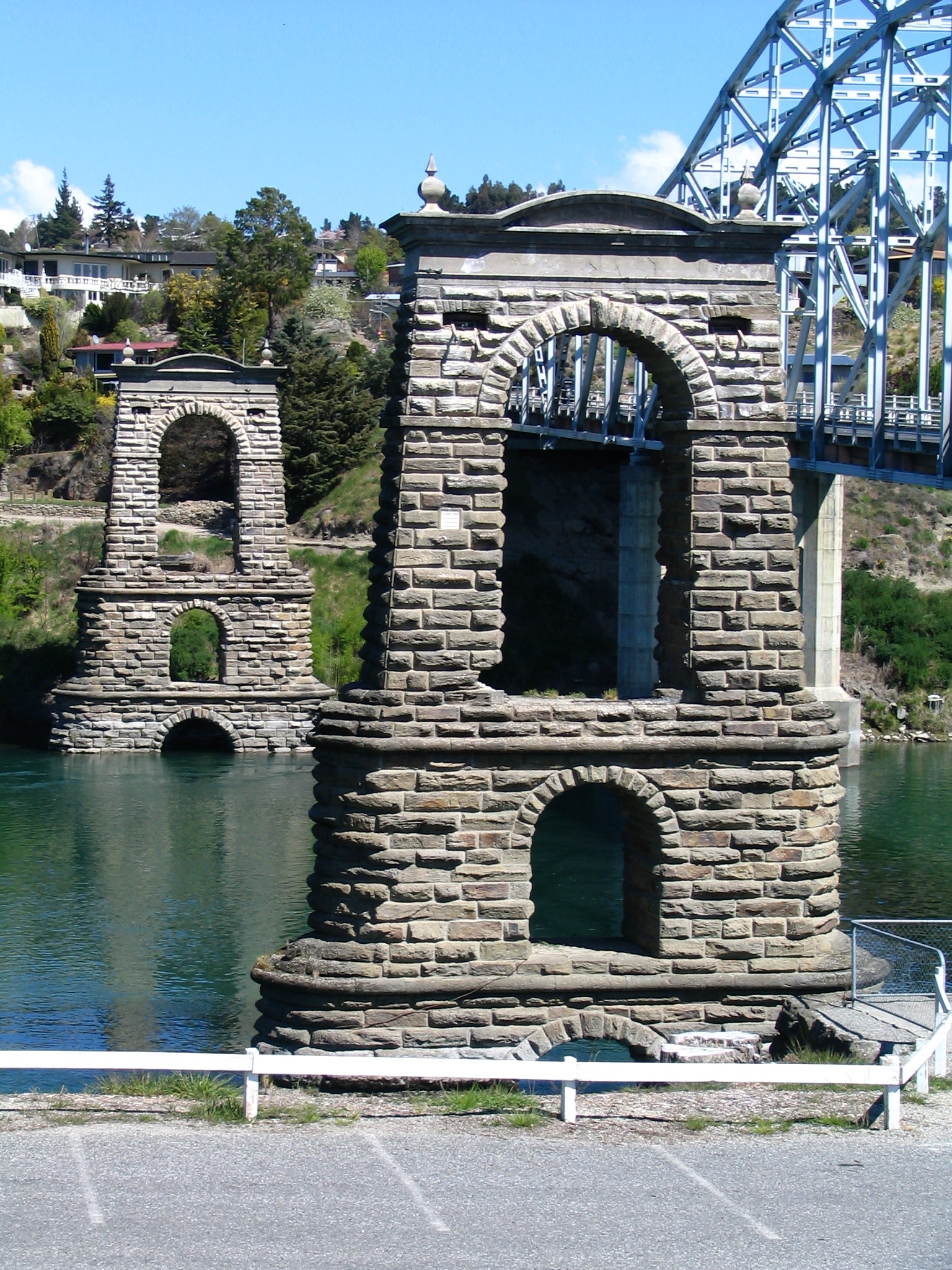

Characteristics
- Design: Suspension

History
- Opened: 1 June 1882
- Closed: 5 July 1958

The old bridge opened on 1 June 1882. It used to connect Old Bridge Road (Bridge Hill side of the Clutha/Mata-au) and Rivers Street (Alexandra township side). It was built by Vincent County engineer Leslie Duncan Macgeorge in 1882, and was a suspension bridge. At the time, was one of New Zealand's biggest and strongest. It was a much-needed bridge because 4 years earlier the nearest bridge, located at Clyde (upstream), was washed away in a flood.

All that remains of the old bridge are the piers, abutments, and towers. These are listed as a Category I historic place by Heritage New Zealand. The decking and cables were removed in the months of June and July, 1963.

The bridge's roadway was 554 feet from bank to bank. At the time it was built, it was the suspension bridge with the greatest length. The centre arch measured 262 feet 6 inches long. The centre of the bridge stood 40 to 50 feet above the middle of the river.

The east side abutment was made of masonry in a solid mass consisting of blocks of stone placed on piles made of totara wood and black pine. It was 83 feet in length and stood 26 feet high. The deck was a double layer of planks.

The west side pier and moorings were situated on rock. The piers reached 90 feet high from the river's bedrock. The structure was supported by 8 cables each three inches in diameter.

The Alexandra Pipe Band marched across the bridge as part of the opening celebrations on 1 June 1882, and also to mark the official closing on the same day that the new bridge opened on 5 July 1958.

== New Alexandra bridge ==
Alexandra bridge (new)
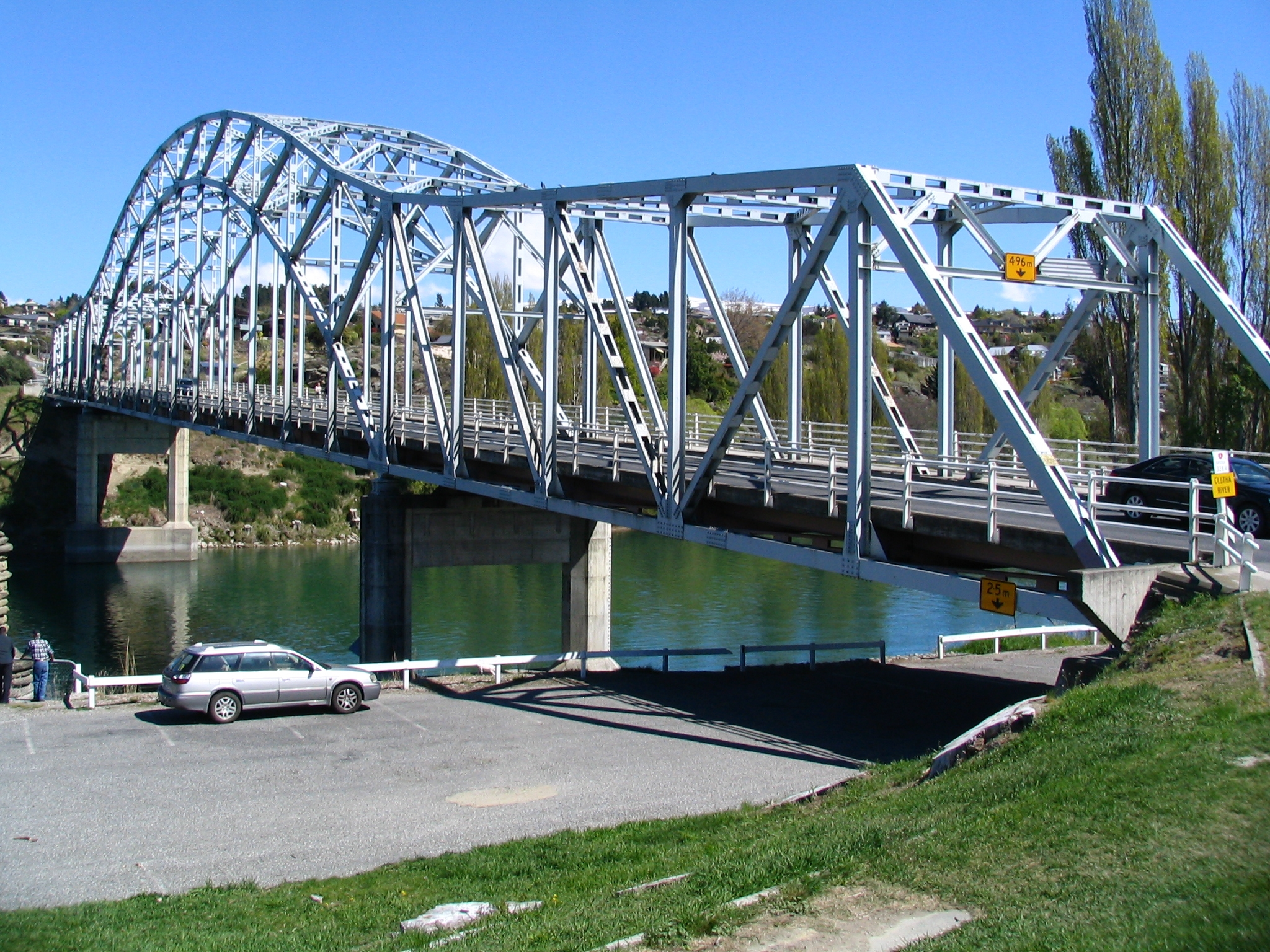

Characteristics
- Design: Steel truss arch

History
- Opened: 5 July 1958

The new bridge is situated adjacent and just upstream of the old bridge. It is a steel truss arch bridge and part of New Zealand State Highway 8.

It was opened on 5 July 1958 and cost £261,000. The Alexandra Pipe Band marched across the bridge as part of the opening celebrations and then marched across the old bridge to indicate its closing.

It was built to replace the old bridge. The old bridge was a single lane, which was insufficient to handle the increasing amount of traffic.

Plans to strengthen the bridge are underway. The work is intended to take place between March and the end of June 2015. The work will be undertaken by the New Zealand Transport Agency and will cost almost $700,000. The reinforcements will allow heavier vehicles to cross the bridge. The work, most of which will be conducted underneath the bridge, will involve the installation of large steel beams.
