= Guy Alexandre =

- Born: August 1945; St. Marc
- Died: February 28, 2014 (aged 68)
- Education: Collège Saint -Martial
- Partner: Evelyn Margron Alexandre
- Children: 3
- Scientific career
- Fields: Sociology
- Institutions: Institute Pédagogique National

Guy Alexandre (August 1945 – February 28, 2014) was a Haitian sociologist, diplomat, and professor.

== Life and career ==
=== Early life and education ===
Alexandre was born in St. Marc. He attended the Collège Saint -Martial in Port-au-Prince, where he was a member of the Christian Student Youth Group (JEC). From 1967-1974, Guy studied Political Science in Belgium and Sociology in Paris.

=== Teaching career ===
He then taught at a French high school. In 1979, he returned to Haiti, working at the Institute Pédagogique National (IPN) in Port-au-Prince, focusing on educational research and teacher training. He later taught at the Université d'Etat d'Haïti, Université Quisqueya, the l'Ecole Normale, and the Facultad de Ciencias Sociales Latinoamericana (FLACSO) in Santo Domingo.

=== Diplomacy career ===
He worked with the Groupe d'Appui aux Rapatriés et Réfugiés (GARR) in defense of Haitians in the Dominican Republic and the Mouvement d'Action Démocratique (MAD). He was a founding member of the Comité National du Congres of Movements Démocratiques (CONACOM).

In 1991, he was assigned to be a diplomat to the Dominican Republic. In the uprising against President Jean-Bertrand Aristide in 2003, Alexandre lost his post as diplomat. From 2004 to 2006, he served as an advisor for international relations for the interim government. Afterward, he became a senior advisor for International Organization for Migration in Haiti, where he was tasked with returning deportees. He wrote a book about how to improve the relationship between Haiti and the Dominican Republic. Among the issues that concerned him was a 2013 Dominican court ruling that removed citizenship rights to the children of undocumented foreigners.

=== Death and legacy ===
He died of a heart attack on February 28, 2014, in Port-au-Prince. Former Haitian Prime Minister Jean-Max Bellerive called Alexandre "a true democrat always looking for a pragmatic way to use his empirical studies or his authority to improve the daily reality of Haitians.”
