= Anderson (footballer, born 1978) =

Brazilian footballer

Personal information
- Full name: Anderson Roberto da Silva Luiz
- Date of birth: February 1, 1978 (age 48)
- Place of birth: Apucarana, Paraná, Brazil
- Height: 1.87 m (6 ft 2 in)
- Position: Striker

Youth career
- 1996–1997: Corinthians Alagoano

Senior career*
Years	Team	Apps	(Gls)
1997–1998	Benfica	0	(0)
1997–1998	→ Alverca (loan)	2	(0)
1998	Corinthians	2	(0)
1998	Náutico		
1999–2002	Alverca	65	(11)
2002–2006	Benfica	0	(0)
2002–2003	→ Moreirense (loan)	4	(0)
2002–2003	→ Al-Rayan (loan)		
2004–2006	Benfica B	11	(2)
2004	→ Naval (loan)	8	(1)
2006	Portuguesa		
2006	Londrina		
2007	Ponte Preta	3	(1)
2007	Ituano	9	(1)
2008	Consadole Sapporo	16	(4)
2009	Liaoning F.C.	18	(10)
2010	Shenyang Dongjin	19	(7)
Total		138	(30)
- * Club domestic league appearances and goals

Anderson Roberto da Silva Luiz (born February 1, 1978), known simply Anderson is a retired Brazilian footballer who played as striker.

Having represented numerous clubs throughout his career, he was mainly associated with Alverca, playing there in 1997 and 1999 to 2002. He then moved to Benfica where he spent majority of time on loan spells or in the reserve team.

== Career ==
Born in Apucarana, Paraná, Luiz began at Corinthians Alagoano in 1996. A year later, he moved to Benfica as part of a partnership between both clubs. Without him knowing, he was loaned to feeder team Alverca, competing in the Segunda Divisão de Honra. In his short spell there, he suffered a serious injury and returned to Brazil to heal, playing for Corinthians and Náutico in 1998.

In July 1999, he returned to Alverca, promising a different outcame: "My objective is to score a lot of goals. I came for that, to help Alverca stay in the top tier." He made his debut in the Primeira Liga on 22 August 1999, against Braga, and scored his first goal on 17 October, in a 2–1 win against Sporting CP. Two weeks later, he added a double against Benfica, in a 3–1 win against them, immediately sparking interest from both Sporting and Benfica. In 2000–01, Anderson was involved in a controversy with his manager Jesualdo Ferreira, after he reacted poorly to a 37th minute substitution. He scored just one goal in the season, being sideline for months due to injury. He remained at Alverca for a third season, and for the second time in Portugal, scored another double against Benfica, in a 3-2 loss on 30 September 2001.

In May 2002, Anderson expressed his desire to leave Alverca, due to the relegation to Segunda Liga: " I have been here for many years and I should not stay in this club, who was relegated, any longer. I think I am not staying, although I have nothing but good things to say about this club." A few days later, it was disclosed that he would join Benfica in the next season. Despite good performances in the pre-season, he was loaned to Moreirense in late August. His spell at Moreirense did not go well. In October, he was criticized by Manuel Machado for "lack of commitment" and "professionalism", with the striker expressing his desire to return to Benfica. In November, the situation deteriorated so much that he was suspended and ordered to practise away from the main team. A few days later, he returned to the training sessions with his teammates after apologizing for his behaviour. Still, two weeks later, he left the team and moved to Al-Rayan on another loan deal.

In 2003–04, Benfica could not find a club for him, so he spent the first six months on Benfica B. On 31 January 2004, he was loaned to Naval for the remainder of the season. After this loan, he spent 1 1/2 seasons at Benfica B, before signing with Portuguesa on 19 January 2006. In September 2006, he joined Londrina until the end of the year and in 2007, he moved to Ponte Preta and then Ituano. His final years of his career were at Consadole Sapporo in the J1 League and at Liaoning and Shenyang Dongjin in the Chinese second tier.

== Honours ==
Liaoning FC

- China League One: 2009
