= Alexandra Gardens =

Alexandra Gardens may refer to:

- Alexandra Gardens, Melbourne, Victoria, Australia
- Alexandra Gardens, Windsor, Berkshire, England, United Kingdom
- Alexandra Gardens, Cathays Park, Cardiff, Wales, United Kingdom

== See also ==
- Alexandra Park (disambiguation)
