= Concepción Aleixandre =

Spanish teacher, doctor, inventor, scientist, and writer

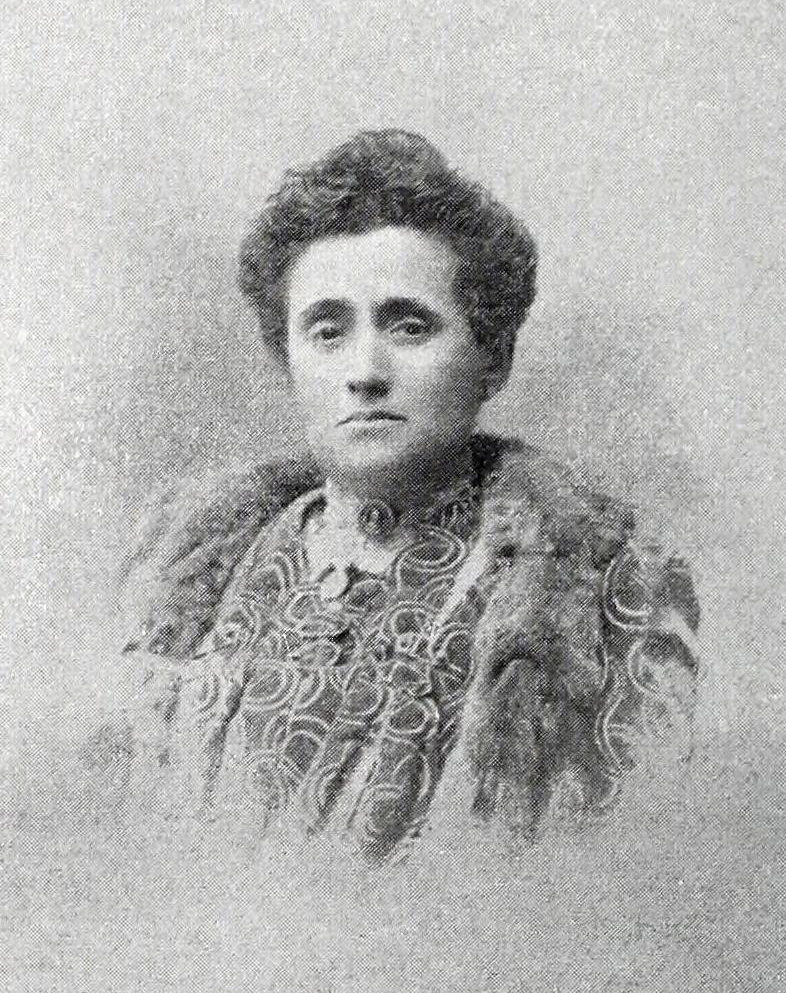
- Born: María de la Concepcion Aleixandre Ballester; 2 February 1862; Valencia, Spain
- Died: 1952; Valencia, Spain
- Occupations: Doctor; Inventor; Scientist; Educator

María de la Concepcion Aleixandre Ballester, also known as Maria de la Concepcion Isidra Faustina Stephanie Vicenta (1862, Valencia – 1952), was a Spanish teacher, medical doctor, gynecologist, inventor, scientist, and writer. She was the first woman admitted to Spain's Gynecological Society.

== Biography ==
Concepción was born in Valencia into a wealthy family. Soon after graduating from high school, she continued her studies at Escuela Normal Femenina de Valencia, where she received her teaching degree; however, she would never work as a teacher. Throughout her life, she maintained her constant desire for and interest in pedagogy. Aleixandre, however, decided to follow a very unusual, unknown and unthinkable path for women at the time (who were usually restricted to domesticity and child education): she enrolled in the Faculty of Medicine at the Universidad de Valencia. Being one of the first women to choose this path, she had to confront many issues with the university's management, which, in the end, accepted her enrollment.

Aleixandre coincided with Manuela Solís Clarás (1862–1910) in the Faculty of Medicine. Both graduated in 1889 with excellent grades (as happened with their Catalan colleagues). Of the 24 subjects, Aleixandre achieved 20 outstanding (one with prize and one with honor) and was the ninth Spanish woman to have a university degree (until then all in medicine). She specialized in gynecology, taking a doctorate in Madrid, where she developed her professional activity. She was an auxiliary doctor at the Hospital de la Princesa (1891) and at the Provincial House of Maternity and Inclusa (1902). In addition, she opened a private clinic, first (1890) at her own address in Salustiano de Olózaga Street, where she attended poor women for free, and then in Argensola (1906), Serrano (1915) and Núñez de Balboa (1927), where she attended in prepared rooms and adapted schedules for people of different economic possibilities. Her attention became famous because of her warmth and closeness with the patients and their children, who could go to the office to hundreds in a single day.

In 1910, Aleixandre registered a patent (nº 47109) in favor of two metal pessaries of reducible rings. The pessary is a device that is placed in the vagina to correct the descent or prolapse of the uterus, usually as a result of childbirth. This instrument allows the matrix to be supported by supporting the abdominal viscera that affect the organ. Its effect is, therefore, similar to that of the trusses to contain hernias or to the candles that separate the walls of the urethra.

According to Aleixandre in the specification of her patent, the pessary was an instrument commonly used in the toco-genecology of the time and was combined with other procedures (replacement of the prolapse matrix, kneading adhesions or relaxed tissues, electrical strip, electrotherapy or cold baths), also serving to avoid surgical intervention and prevent pathologies such as fibrous degenerations, tubal abnormalities or serious inflammations. Also, Aleixandre points out the inconveniences (infections and bad smell) of the soft pessary designed in rubber by the French gynaecologist Amédée Dumontpallier (1826–1899).

The device invented by the Spanish doctor was the result of her own clinical experiences and consisted of a ring whose body was made of aluminum and wore nickel plated steel springs that provided sufficient elasticity for easy insertion into the vagina without having to tear the vulva and without sliding out once introduced. In addition, the system was offered in two models of different design and size depending on whether they were narrow or dilated cavities and more or less lax walls, being explained through drawings the way to use them and being very simple cleaning through boiling and the use of antiseptic substances. However, this patent did not pass the mandatory procedure of its implementation and ended expired in 1912. Still, it is likely that he used his invention in her usual optional work.

She belonged to several women's organizations which advocated for the advancing of women's rights. Her written work is mostly known from her published articles in journals and conferences, as well as speeches given at scientific meetings. In 2001, Aleixandre was one of the selectees for "100 women of the twentieth century who paved the way for equality in the 21st century women".
