= Alexandra Park =

Alexandra Park may refer to:

== Places ==
=== England ===
- Alexandra Park, Hastings
- Alexandra Park, Ipswich
- Alexandra Park, London
  - Alexandra Park (Haringey ward)
- Alexandra Park, Manchester
  - Alexandra Park (Manchester ward)
- Alexandra Park, Oldham
- Alexandra Park, Poole
- Alexandra Park, Portsmouth
- Alexandra Park Racecourse, London

=== Elsewhere ===
- Alexandra Park, Toronto, Canada
- Alexandra Park, in the West End of Vancouver, Canada
- Alexandra Park, Auckland, New Zealand
- Alexandra Park, Wellington, New Zealand, next to Government House
- Alexandra Park, former name of the City Oval, South Africa
- Alexandra Park, Belfast, Northern Ireland, United Kingdom
- Alexandra Park, Glasgow, Scotland, United Kingdom
- Alexandra Park, Harare, Zimbabwe

== Other uses ==
- Alexandra Park (actress) (born 1989), Australian actress

== See also ==
- Alexander Park (disambiguation)
- Alexandra Gardens (disambiguation)
- Alexandra Parks (born 1984), English singer-songwriter
- Alexandra Stadium, in Crewe, England, United Kingdom
- Alexandra Stadium (South Africa)
