= Xano =

Portuguese footballer (born 1983)

Personal information
- Full name: Idálio Alexandre Ferreira Espírito Santo
- Date of birth: 20 April 1983 (age 43)
- Place of birth: Lisbon, Portugal
- Height: 1.68 m (5 ft 6 in)
- Position: Striker

Youth career
- 1991–2002: Académica

Senior career*
Years	Team	Apps	(Gls)
2001–2006	Académica	20	(2)
2003	→ UD Salamanca (loan)	1	(0)
2004	→ Alverca (loan)	16	(0)
2005	→ Salgueiros (loan)	0	(0)
	Tourizense	33	(19)
2006–2007	Sourense		
2007–2008	Sp. Pombal		
2008–2009	Eastbourne Borough	0	(0)
2009	Sligo Rovers		
2009–2010	Tocha	7	(1)
2011–2012	Penelense	17	(2)
2012–2013	AD Nogueirense	14	(0)
2013–2014	Sourense	29	(6)
- * Club domestic league appearances and goals

Idálio Alexandre Ferreira Espírito Santo (born 20 April 1983) is a Portuguese footballer who plays as a striker. He is simply known as Xano.

== Career ==
Born in Sao Jorge de Arroios, Lisbon, Xano started his career in 1991 in the junior ranks at Académica in Portugal. Earning a first team place in 2001 and helping the side into the Portuguese Liga in 2002, scoring 2 goals in 20 appearances for the club.

He transferred to Spanish Segunda División side Salamanca in 2003 for a season long loan and made one appearance, transferring back to Académica in November 2003 after a disagreement. He transferred in 2004 to Alverca. In 2005 Alverca folded and he joined Salgueiros, a club which faced administration and signed non league players from to save money and played in the lower leagues of Portugal.

Between 2005 and 2008, Xano played for the Portuguese lower division teams of Tourizense, Sourense and Sporting Pombal. Joining Pampilhosa in the Portuguese Second Division in 2007.

In the summer 2008, he moved to Eastbourne for work reasons and joined Eastbourne Borough from Pampilhosa for a trial, he played in the friendly game against Hastings United as a substitute but a knee injury saw him come back off. He returned to Portugal for two months and returned to Eastbourne signing a contract in November 2008 playing for the reserves. He made his first team debut in the Sussex Senior Cup as a substitute in January 2009, and setting up the 11th goal for Eastbourne in the 11–1 win over Crowborough Athletic. He was a named substitute in a first team game against Mansfield but did not play.

He left Eastbourne Borough in February 2009 for pre-season training at Sligo Rovers in Ireland.
