= Jean C. Alexandre =

Haitian diplomat (born 1942)

Jean C. Alexandre (born June 12, 1942) was a Haitian retired diplomat who served as Ambassador of Haiti to the United Nations from 2002 to 2004. Aside from his diplomatic involvement, Alexandre dedicated his life to the practice of medicine, as a Diplomate of the American College of Obstetrics and Gynecology.

== Early life and career ==
Alexandre was born in Port-au-Prince, Haiti. He attended Institution Saint-Louis de Gonzague from elementary to High School, graduating valedictorian of his class in 1960. He received his medical degree from the Faculty of Medicine (State University of Haiti) in 1967. Alexandre completed his residency in obstetrics and gynecology at Loyola University Medical Center, Maywood, Illinois, where he received two certifications, one in sexology and sexual dysfunction and the other in reproductive medicine and infertility. In 1976, Alexandre became board certified in obstetrics and gynecology. From 1973 to 1979, Alexandre held a series of positions in academia, serving as a clinician and teaching research assistant at Loyola University Medical Center and in 1979 he was promoted to assistant professor.

Throughout his long and successful medical career, Alexandre served as attending physician at Foster G. McGaw Hospital, Loyola University Medical Center, Maywood, Illinois, director of the obstetrics and gynecological services at the Martin Luther King Center, Chicago, Illinois, chief of surgery at Northlake Community Hospital, director of the obstetrics and gynecological Services at Madden Mental Health Center, medical director Prenatal Clinic at Westlake Community Hospital, Melrose Park, Illinois, medical director of the Maywood Proviso Community Health Center, president of the American Cancer Society, Maywood chapter (1988–1990), consultant at Edgewater Hospital, Edgewater, Chicago, consultant at Water Tower Surgical Center, Chicago, Illinois, consultant at Oakbrook Surgical Center, Oak Brook, Illinois, president of medical staff at Northlake Hospital, treasurer of medical staff at Westlake Hospital, coordinator of medical residents at Westlake Hospital (gynecology section), and chairman of obstetrics and gynecological services at Westake hospital (1988–2001 and 2005 to 2009).

Alexandre is the medical director and CEO of Alma Medical Center, Maywood Illinois, founder and CEO of the Center for Women and A-1 Medical Imaging, medical director and CEO Apollo Family Health Center, Melrose Park, Illinois.

Alexandre served as the president of the board of directors of Northlake Community Hospital from 1980 to 1982. He is on the board of directors of Caribbean American Development Corporation (CADECO), Haitian American T.B. Association, and executive director of the Council for Health Education & Prevention Services (CHEPS).

Alexandre has been an attending physician at the following Hospitals: Foster G. McGaw Hospital, Loyola University, Oak Park Hospital, Westlake Community Hospital, Melrose Park, Gottlieb Memorial Hospital, Mount Sinai Hospital, Chicago, Illinois.

== Professional affiliations ==
Fellow American College of Obstetrics & Gynecology (ACOG), Fellow, International College of Surgeons, American Society for Reproductive Medicine, American Association of Gynecologic Laparoscopists, Illinois State Medical Society, Chicago Medical Society, American Medical Association (AMA) and Association of Haitian Physicians Abroad (AHME).

== United Nations Ambassador ==
Alexandre was nominated as Haitian Ambassador to the United Nations in 2001. His nomination was unanimously ratified by the Senate and by the Chamber of Deputies, in view of favorable reports regarding his humanitarian and diplomatic efforts around the medical world to help massive promotion of health in Haiti and his multiple international contacts.

In March 2002, Alexandre presented his credentials at the United Nations.

In July 2002, Alexandre was elected as the director of CARICOM group and facilitated the integration of Haiti to this organization. He was elected Vice-President of United Nations General Assembly (July 2003) and on multiple occasions was given the honor of presiding over the 58th session of the Assembly. He was also nominated President of United Nations Population Fund (UNPF) for two years, focusing on a worldwide program to fight against AIDS.

Alexandre proposed the integration of Haiti to the Economic and Social Council of the United Nations (ECOSOC), with 50 favorable votes in 2004. ECOSOC is one of six principal organs of the United Nations, responsible for the coordination of economic, social, and related work of the UN specialized agencies. ECOSOC also holds a meeting each April with finance ministers heading key committees of the World Bank and the International Monetary Fund (IMF). The ECOSOC serves as the central forum for discussing international economic and social issues, and for formulating policies and recommendations addressed to member states and the United Nations system.

After this initiative, Alexandre tried to have Haiti elected as a member of the Security Council of the United Nations. However, his attempt was unsuccessful. The General Assembly accepted to designate the UN Haitian ambassador as vice-president of Less Developed Countries Association, and Landlocked Countries. He participated at the Council for Foreign and Community Relations (COFCOR), at the Council for Human and Social Development (COHSOD) at the International Ministerial Congress of Cotonou (Benin), at the following Congress: Summit on the Children Affairs (New-York, May 2002), Commission on the Development (Mexico, June 2002), Caricom Summit (Guyana, August 2002), Summit of Johannesburg (March 2003).

In April – May 2003, following Alexandre's request and lobbying, the United Nations adopted resolutions to commemorate the bicentennial anniversary of the death of Toussaint Louverture and the bicentennial of Haitian flag. Under his leadership the UN General Assembly adopted unanimously a special Resolution to proclaim 2004 as the “International Year of Abolition of Slavery”.

Alexandre negotiated a Commercial Accord of Cooperation of Haiti with Azerbaijan and inaugurated the diplomatic relations with this country. He renegotiated the commercial relationship with Cuba, visited China and Taiwan to reorganize the position of Haiti with these two different entities. During a visit in South Africa, Alexandre negotiated with the Government of South Africa its participation to the commemoration of the Bicentennial Independence of Haiti. He reinforced the relations between Haiti and the United States and between Haiti and the International Organization of Francophony. He worked to consolidate bonds of friendship between Haiti and Israel (2003–2006) and was nominated ambassador to Israel. Alexandre and Kofi Annan, the secretary-general of the United Nations, developed a large humanitarian program for Haiti. At the time to present his candidature to become the first Haitian member of the executive Board of UNICEF, he was recalled by the Haitian Ministry of Foreign Affairs.

Besides his diplomatic and medical careers, Alexandre has been an educator, successful businessman and entrepreneur, community activist and philanthropist. He volunteered in many Humanitarian programs and medical missions in Haiti, and initiated several programs of development for Haiti, especially after the 2010 earthquake providing successful relief efforts to improve and preserve the life of countless Haitian citizens. Alexandre founded and directed many civic, cultural, and philanthropic organizations.

Alexandre was the coordinator for National Democratic Front in Chicago, Illinois, in 1990, and also a member of the Provisional Electoral Council of Haiti, July 2000. He is president of Poto Mitan International, president of Men Kontre, president of International Institute of Strategic and Diplomatic Research (ISDR), president of Haitian-American Voters Organization, president of Progressive Haitian American Organization, president and founder of Solidarity with Bishop Romelus Crusade, chairman of Partners with Sassier and executive director of Council of Health Housing Education and Public Service (CHEPS). He received a series of international decorations and awards from America, Europe and Africa.
