= Under Fire (1957 film) =

1957 film by James B. Clark

- Theatrical release poster
- Directed by: James B. Clark
- Screenplay by: James Landis
- Produced by: Plato A. Skouras associate E.J. Baumgarten
- Starring: Rex Reason; Harry Morgan; Steve Brodie; Peter Walker; Robert Levin; Jon Locke
- Cinematography: John M. Nickolaus Jr.
- Edited by: Jodie Copelan
- Music by: Paul Dunlap
- Production company: Regal Films Inc
- Distributed by: 20th Century Fox
- Release date: September 23, 1957
- Running time: 76 minutes
- Country: United States
- Language: English

Under Fire, also known as Dark Valor, is a 1957 American drama film directed by James B. Clark, written by James Landis, and starring Rex Reason, Harry Morgan, Steve Brodie, Peter Walker, Robert Levin and Jon Locke. It was released on September 23, 1957, by 20th Century Fox.

The film was produced by Plato A. Skouras, son of 20th Century Fox chairman Spyros Skouras.

== Cast ==
- Rex Reason as Lt. Steve Rogerson
- Harry Morgan as Sgt. Joseph C. Dusak
- Steve Brodie as Capt. Linn
- Peter Walker as Lt. Sarris
- Robert Levin as Pvt. Pope
- Jon Locke as Corp. John Crocker
- Gregory LaFayette as Cpl. Quinn
- Karl Lukas as Sgt. Hutchins
- William Allyn as Lt. Karl Stagg
- Frank Gerstle as Col. Dundee
- Tom McKee as Capt. O'Mar
- George Chakiris as Pvt. Steiner

== Production ==
Filming started in June 1957. The same team later made Sierra Baron, and Villa!!
