= Rudd Weatherwax =

American actor (1907–1985)

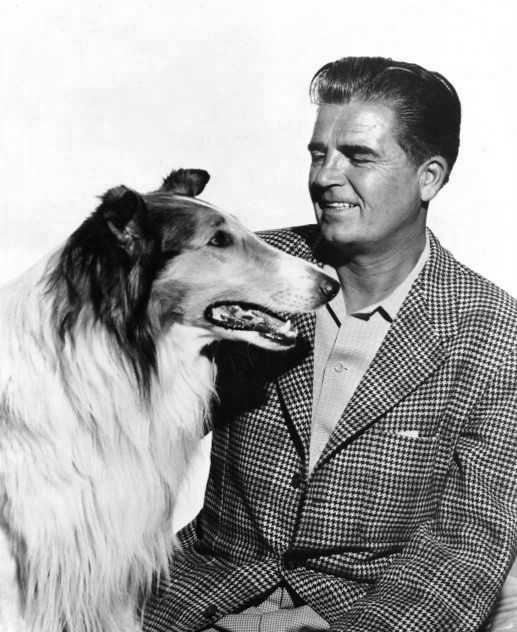
- Weatherwax and Lassie, 1955
- Born: Ruddell Bird Weatherwax; September 23, 1907; Engle, New Mexico Territory
- Died: February 25, 1985 (aged 77)
- Other name: Ruddel Weatherwax

Ruddell Bird "Rudd" Weatherwax (September 23, 1907 – February 25, 1985) was an American actor, animal trainer, and breeder. He and his brother Frank are best remembered for training dogs for motion pictures and television. Their collie, Pal, became the original Lassie, handled by Rudd for the 1943 Metro-Goldwyn-Mayer film Lassie Come Home. He also handled the dogs for the Lassie television series which ran from 1954 to 1974, and trained Spike for the 1957 feature film Old Yeller. After his death, his son, Robert, took over the training of the animals.

Weatherwax was also responsible for training the official New York Mets’ team mascot in the 1960s, a beagle named Homer.

== Biography ==
Weatherwax was born in Engle, New Mexico Territory, the son of Anna Elisa (née Wallis) and Walter Smiley Weatherwax.

Pal became a movie star through a weather-related event. MGM, which had decided to use a show collie trained by Frank Inn in the movie, took advantage of a massive flooding of the Sacramento River in northern California to obtain some spectacular footage for the film. Inn's collie was still in training, so MGM hired Pal as a stand-in for the river scene. Although the work was considered complicated for an animal actor, the dog performed exceptionally well. According to legend, after seeing the first prints, MGM head Louis B. Mayer stated that "Pal had entered the water, but Lassie had come out," and a new star was born.

MGM owned the rights to Lassie's name, but when the series of films ended, Weatherwax obtained those rights in lieu of his final year's salary and a little additional money. Therefore, he benefited from those rights during the program's 17-year run on CBS and additional broadcasts in syndication.

== Legacy ==
Weatherwax was posthumously inducted into the New Mexico Entertainment Hall of Fame in 2012. He had two sons, Jackie and Bob. He was the uncle of Ken Weatherwax, who played Pugsley Addams in The Addams Family television series.

He received a joke 'screen credit' in the Dudley Do-Right segment Faithful Dog, playing Dudley.

== Book ==
FOUR FEET TO FAME: A Hollywood Dog Trainer's Journey, by Bob Weatherwax and Richard Lester. Published 2017 by BearManor Media. ISBN 978-1-62933-092-1.
