= Caryl Ledner =

Novelist and television writer (1921–1984)

- Born: Caryl Betty Goldsmith; March 22, 1921; Chicago, Illinois, US
- Died: March 31, 1984 (aged 63); Los Angeles, California, U.S.
- Resting place: Hillside Memorial Park
- Occupations: Television writer, novelist
- Years active: 1970 – 1983
- Known for: A Great American Tragedy (1972); Mary White (1977)

Caryl Ledner (née Caryl Betty Goldsmith; March 22, 1921 – March 31, 1984) was an American television scriptwriter and story editor, novelist and biographer, best known for her Emmy-winning script for the 1977 made-for-TV film Mary White.

== Early life and career ==
Born in Chicago, Illinois, Ledner was of German-Jewish descent, the only child of Sidney J. Goldsmith and Jessie Rothschild. By 1925 at the latest, it appears that the family had moved to New York City. However, by no later than October 26, 1939, the date of her first and only wedding, the then 18-year-old Ledner and her family had relocated to the west coast, as she and her husband initially lived with her parents in Los Angeles.

It appears that by no later than 1948, more than two decades prior to the first work published under her name, Ledner was employed as a story editor at MGM.

Ledner's first publicized screenwriting project, as reported in September 1970 by both Broadcasting and Variety, and by the Los Angeles Times shortly thereafter, was Wanda's World, a projected NBC soap opera, created by Ledner and former American Heritage editor Annette Welles, to be produced by Paramount Television. Concerning relations between residents of an integrated community, the series was to be developed under the supervision of Watts Writers Workshop founder and frequent Julia scripter Harry Dolan. However, despite passing mentions of this upcoming series as late as August of the following year (most notably in the LA Times followup story on Ledner's 1971 authorial debut, which notes that both the book and the prospective TV series were drawn from the same person's life experiences), it appears that the project never progressed beyond the development phase.

Ledner's first published work was the well-received 1971 as-told-to autobiography, Ossie : The Autobiography of a Black Woman. The book was named one the 33 best of 1971 by the American Library Association, which strongly recommended its use in high schools and in college Black studies programs.

Reviewing A Great American Tragedy, Ledner's first produced screenplay, the story of a middle-aged aerospace engineer, portrayed by George Kennedy, who suddenly finds himself unemployed and seemingly unemployable, the New York Times' Howard Thompson notes that "[b]oth J. Lee Thompson's direction and Caryl Ledner's writing are best in the rather coolly dispassionate vignettes peeling down the prideful hero," while L.A. Times critic Kevin Thomas singles out Ledner's contribution.

In all aspects Miss Ledner is an excellent writer. She has ideas, perception and a sense of commitment. She can create an array of people whom we can recognize and care about. To top it off she has wit and style. Surely Caryl Ledner will be heard from again.

Ledner's Tragedy script—especially in regards to the strong supporting role it afforded Vera Miles—got the attention of actress/aspiring producer Nancy Malone, with the result that Ledner provided the screenplay for Malone's producing debut, the 1975 NBC TV movie Winner Take All (originally titled Time Lock). The film itself, which concerns a seemingly happily married housewife—portrayed by Shirley Jones—who is quickly revealed to be in the throes of gambling addiction (a crisis which, like that undergone by Kennedy's character in Tragedy, stresses the protagonist's marriage to the breaking point), was well received, although director Paul Bogart later described the effect of rewrites made at the network's insistence to Ledner's original script—which had attracted him to the project in the first place—as "disastrous".

Ledner's first novel, The Bondswoman, was published by St. Martin's Press in the summer of 1977. In the March of that year, the WGA West Newsletter reported that the book's publisher, St Martin's Press, had already initiated discussions with Ledner regarding a possible sequel. However, despite both that report and the novel's own dust jacket bio stating that Ledner "is presently at work on a sequel to The Bondswoman," no sequel appears to have been published.

Meanwhile, plans to make a TV movie entitled Mary White—based on newspaper editor William Allen White's famous recounting of his late daughter's tragically abbreviated life—were afoot as early as May 1974, when producer Robert Radnitz's intention to make the film—facilitated by the favorable impression his prior work had made on one particularly influential White family friend, U.S. Supreme Court Justice William O. Douglas—was first reported by Hollywood columnist James Bacon. Ledner's name, as credited screenwriter, was attached to the project in March 1976, but it was not until May of the following year that production got underway. The film finally aired on November 18, 1977. Aside from a raft of glowing press clippings, Mary White eventually earned Ledner both a Christopher Award for "Distinguished Achievement in TV" and an Emmy for Outstanding Writing in a Special Program - Drama or Comedy - Adaptation.

Ledner also novelized her Mary White script for Bantam Books, published in December 1977. Termed "a rather fine little novel" by El Paso Times critic Dale L. Walker, Ledner's novelization was deemed even better than the film by the Manhattan Mercury's Roy Bird.

== Personal life and death ==
Ledner was married to Gerald Andrew 'Jerry' Ledner from 1939 until her death. They had two daughters.

After having suffered from multiple sclerosis for several years (and having publicly advocated for the right to die the previous January), Ledner died in Los Angeles on March 31, 1984, after what was described by the Los Angeles Times as "a long illness." A tribute penned by Ledner's colleague Oliver Crawford, published on April 2 in the WGA West Newsletter, indicates that in addition to that unnamed longstanding illness, Ledner had recently contracted yet another disease (likewise unnamed), which she elected not to treat, on the grounds "even if it [i.e. "the second serious illness"] can be arrested, it will not alleviate the first." Moreover, the funeral announcement published in the same day's Los Angeles Times, while maintaining the stance of official non-disclosure, does inform readers that, "In lieu of flowers, family prefers donations to Multiple Sclerosis or the American Cancer Society." Ledner's remains are interred at Hillside Memorial Park.

== Works ==
=== Books ===
- Guffe, Ossie; Ledner, Caryl (1971). Ossie : The Autobiography of a Black Woman. W. W. Norton & Company.
- Ledner, Caryl (1977). The Bondswoman. New York: St. Martin's Press.
- Ledner, Caryl (1977). Mary White. New York: Bantam Books.
- Chang, Diana (1978). The gift of love; Based on a teleplay by Caryl Ledner. New York: Ballantine Books.

=== Filmography ===
- A Great American Tragedy (1972)
- The Waltons (1974), ep. "The Spoilers" (Season 3, ep. 9)
- Winner Take All (1975)
- Gibbsville (1977), "A Case History" (Season 1, ep. 10 (Note: The episode was never seen in the United States, as NBC cancelled the show after episode 6 aired on December 30, 1976. However, the short-lived series was also broadcast by TV networks in England and Wales, both of which did air the episode.))
- Mary White (1977)
- The Gift of Love (1978)
- Eleanor, First Lady of the World (1982)
- O. Henry's 'The Last Leaf' (1983)
