= Radnitz =

Radnitz may refer to:

- Robert B. Radnitz (1924–2010), German film producer
- German name of the Czech city Radnice
