= The Westerner (TV series) =

American television series (1960-1961)

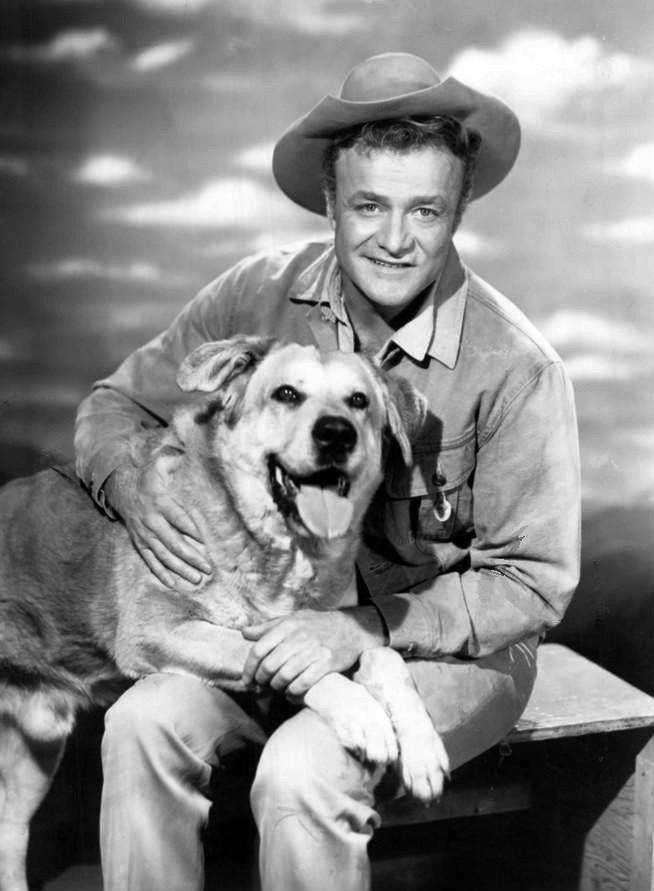
- Brian Keith as Dave Blassingame and Spike as Brown, 1960
- Genre: Western
- Created by: Sam Peckinpah
- Starring: Brian Keith
- Music by: Herschel Burke Gilbert; Rudy Schrager; Joseph Mullendore
- Country of origin: United States
- Original language: English
- No. of seasons: 1
- No. of episodes: 13

Production
- Executive producer: Hal Hudson
- Producer: Sam Peckinpah
- Production locations: Republic Studios, Los Angeles, California, U.S.
- Camera setup: Single-camera
- Running time: 25 mins.
- Production company: Four Star Productions

Original release
- Network: NBC
- Release: September 30 – December 30, 1960

The Westerner is an American Western television series that aired on NBC from September 30 to December 30, 1960. Created and produced by Sam Peckinpah, who also wrote and directed some episodes, the series was a Four Star Television production. Brian Keith starred in the lead role of Dave Blassingame, an amiable, unexceptional cowhand and drifter, accompanied by his dog Brown.

== Overview ==
Dave Blassingame is a cowboy and drifter who is handy with a gun and his fists, travelling through an often lawless country trying to get enough money together to buy his own ranch.

His dog Brown is played by Spike, trained by Frank Weatherwax and best known for playing the title role in Old Yeller. Brown figures prominently in a number of episodes, appears in all of them, and always appears following Blassingame during the end credits.

== Cast ==
=== Main ===
- Brian Keith as Dave Blassingame
- Spike as Brown
- Hank Gobble as Digger
- Jimmy Lee Cook as Band Member
- Michael T. Mikler as Band Member
- Marie Selland as Addie McKeen
- John Dehner as Burgundy Smith

=== Guest stars ===
Guest stars included Malcolm Atterbury, Ben Cooper, Katy Jurado, and John M. Pickard, Jack Tornek, Sam Jaffe, and one episode (the first, "Jeff") memorably featured future Peckinpah regular Warren Oates as a drunk quietly passing out at a table. Other guest stars, like Ms. Jurado, would later go on to appear in some of Peckinpah's feature films. These included John Anderson (Ride the High Country), R. G. Armstrong (Pat Garrett and Billy the Kid), Dub Taylor (The Wild Bunch, The Getaway), and Mary Murphy (Junior Bonner).

== Episodes ==
No.	Title	Directed by	Written by	Original release date
Pilot	"Trouble at Tres Cruces"	Sam Peckinpah	Sam Peckinpah	March 26, 1959
This was episode 24 of season 3 of Dick Powell's Zane Grey Theatre.
1	"Jeff"	Sam Peckinpah	Robert Heverly, Sam Peckinpah	September 30, 1960
2	"School Days"	André De Toth	Robert Heverly, Sam Peckinpah	October 7, 1960
3	"Brown"	Sam Peckinpah	Bruce Geller	October 21, 1960
4	"Mrs. Kennedy"	Bernard L. Kowalski	John Dunkel, Sam Peckinpah	October 28, 1960
5	"Dos Pinos"	Don McDougall	E. Jack Neuman	November 4, 1960
6	"The Courting of Libby"	Sam Peckinpah	Bruce Geller	November 11, 1960
7	"Treasure"	Ted Post	Cyril Hume	November 18, 1960
8	"The Old Man"	André De Toth	Jack Curtis, Sam Peckinpah	November 25, 1960
9	"Ghost of a Chance"	Bruce Geller	Milton S. Gelman	December 2, 1960
10	"Line Camp"	Tom Gries	Tom Gries	December 9, 1960
11	"Going Home"	Elliot Silverstein	Jack Curtis	December 16, 1960
12	"Hand on the Gun"	Sam Peckinpah	Bruce Geller	December 23, 1960
13	"The Painting"	Sam Peckinpah	Bruce Geller	December 30, 1960

== Production ==
=== Music ===
The musical score was largely the work of Four Star's Herschel Burke Gilbert.

== Release ==
=== Broadcast ===
The pilot for The Westerner appeared on CBS's Dick Powell's Zane Grey Theatre.

=== Syndication as The Westerners ===
For rerun syndication it was grouped with three other short-lived Western series from the same company, Black Saddle starring Peter Breck, Johnny Ringo starring Don Durant, and Law of the Plainsman starring Michael Ansara, under the umbrella title The Westerners, bracketed with hosting sequences featuring Keenan Wynn.

=== Home media ===
A two-DVD set of the complete series including the pilot episode was released by Shout! Factory in February 2017.

== Reception ==
The critically acclaimed series ran for 13 episodes, but it was cancelled because of low ratings (due to being placed in the same time slot as The Flintstones and Route 66).

=== Aftermath and influence ===
Following the series' cancellation, Peckinpah and Keith made the film The Deadly Companions together, the former's feature directorial debut. Peckinpah was later approached by producer Richard N. Lyons to direct Ride the High Country after the latter was impressed by his work on The Westerner.

== Spin-offs and remakes ==
=== The Losers (1963) ===
An attempt to update and revive the hardbitten series aired as a January 1963 episode of The Dick Powell Theater, "The Losers", directed by Peckinpah and featuring Lee Marvin as Dave Blassingame and Keenan Wynn as Burgundy Smith, but set in the modern West. Rosemary Clooney portrayed the leading lady.

=== Will Penny (1968) ===
One of the episodes of The Westerner, "Line Camp" guest-starring Robert Culp, was the basis for the 1968 film Will Penny starring Charlton Heston. Slim Pickens plays essentially the same role, as a feisty derby-wearing cook, in both the television episode and the movie.

=== The Gambler Returns (1991) ===
Brian Keith briefly played the same character again in 1991's The Gambler Returns: The Luck of the Draw, which featured a number of 1950s and 1960s television Western series leads reprising their roles in quick cameo appearances (Gene Barry as Bat Masterson, Hugh O'Brian as Wyatt Earp, Jack Kelly as Bart Maverick, Clint Walker as Cheyenne Bodie, David Carradine as Kung Fu's Caine, Chuck Connors as The Rifleman, and so on).
