= The Big Show (1961 film) =

1961 film

- Directed by: James B. Clark
- Written by: Ted Sherdeman
- Based on: I'll Never Go There Any More; 1941 novel by Jerome Weidman
- Produced by: James B. Clark; Ted Sherdeman
- Starring: Esther Williams; Cliff Robertson; Nehemiah Persoff
- Cinematography: Otto Heller
- Edited by: Benjamin Laird
- Music by: Paul Sawtell; Bert Shefter
- Color process: DeLuxe Color
- Production companies: Associated Producers Incorporated; Gemtaur Productions
- Distributed by: 20th Century Fox
- Release date: July 14, 1961
- Running time: 113 minutes
- Country: United States
- Language: English
- Budget: $830,000 or $1 million

The Big Show is a 1961 American drama film directed by James B. Clark, starring Esther Williams and Cliff Robertson. The cast also includes Robert Vaughn, Margia Dean, Nehemiah Persoff, and David Nelson, who was best known to audiences of the time for The Adventures of Ozzie and Harriet television show. The film was shot in DeLuxe Color and CinemaScope.

This is the third variation of Jerome Weidman's novel I'll Never Go There Any More. The other two are Broken Lance (1954), a western version starring Spencer Tracy, and House of Strangers (1949), set in the big city starring Edward G. Robinson.

It was the most expensive film produced by Robert L. Lippert's production company, Associated Producers Incorporated (API).

== Plot ==
Bruno Everhardis the rigid and uncompromising owner of a German traveling circus. His four sons and daughter all work for the circus, including as performers. Three of the boys, in particular Klaus, resent the favoritism Bruno shows one son, Josef.

To curry his father's favor, Klaus abandons his sweetheart, circus aerialist Carlotta Martinez, to marry instead Teresa Vizzini, whose father operates an animal menagerie that Bruno would like to merge with as a result. Josef, in the meantime, has fallen in love with a wealthy American woman, Hillary Allen, who wants him to quit the circus and begin a new life.

Bruno is defied by his daughter who marries Eric, a soldier wishing to try the trapeze. Teresa, distraught at learning why Klaus married her, is killed by one of the circus bears when she is in a dazed state of mind.

Carlotta, too, is almost killed due to a faulty high wire during her act. Negligence is charged and Josef accepts the blame, sparing his father from having to go to prison. The other brothers seize the opportunity to take control of the circus. Bruno attempts a comeback on the trapeze, but he has a heart attack and dies.

Released from prison, Josef vows revenge. Klaus decides to kill his own brother but steps too close to the bear's cage and is killed. Wishing there to be no more violence or retribution, Josef decides to leave the circus for good, and Hillary agrees to marry him.

== Cast ==
- Esther Williams as Hillary Allen
- Cliff Robertson as Josef Everard
- Nehemiah Persoff as Bruno Everard
- Robert Vaughn as Klaus Everard
- Margia Dean as Carlotta Martinez
- David Nelson as Eric Solden
- Carol Christensen as Garda Everard
- Kurt Pecher as Hans Everard
- Renate Mannhardt as Teresa Vizzini
- Franco Andrei as Fredrik Everard
- Peter Capell as Pietro Vizzini
- Stefan Schnabel as Lawyer
- Carleton Young as Judge Richter
- Philo Hauser as Ringmaster
- Mariza Tomic as Fraustein

== Production ==
James Clark and Ted Sherdeman had worked together on A Dog of Flanders for Associated Producers Incorporated (API). They formed their own company, Gemtaur Productions, and made The Big Show with API.

At one stage Millie Perkins was announced as the lead.

The film was shot in Munich, Germany, and Copenhagen, Denmark, in November 1960.

Esther Williams insisted on writing her own dialogue.

== Reception ==
Maury Dexter says the film was a moderate success at the box office.

=== Critical response ===
Howard Thompson of The New York Times wrote in his review of the film: "Against the excellently staged sawdust numbers (the polar bear act is fascinating), the increasingly ugly incidents edge toward dank, Gothic melodrama (a trial and a murderous climactic fight). There is little lightness or imagination in either the script or the directing. As softening concessions, we have two obvious romantic interludes. In one, young Carol Christensen pairs off with David Nelson, as a smitten American soldier—and the youngsters do very nicely. The main match brackets the laconic Mr. Robertson, as the noblest circus heir, and a starry-eyed Miss Williams, in the briefest role of her career, as a rich American expatriate without a pool to her name. She does dip once, swiftly, in an inserted and strikingly photographed resort sequence (Scandinavia). The film's best performance, with the cast striving hard, comes from Renate Mannhardt, as a lovely betrayed bear-tamer. Robert Vaughn, Margia Dean, and Kurt Fecher are okay in other supporting parts. But The Big Show is an unappetizing bill of goods, beautiful to look at."

Clark and Sherman worked on another film for API, Brother, but it appears to have not been made.

== Release ==
The Big Show was released in theatres on July 14, 1961. The film was released on DVD on December 11, 2012.
