= Ted Sherdeman =

American screenwriter (1909–1987)

- Born: June 21, 1909; Lincoln, Nebraska
- Died: August 22, 1987 (aged 78); Santa Ana, California
- Occupations: Radio producer, television writer and screenwriter
- Children: 1

Ted Sherdeman (21 June 1909 – 22 August 1987) was an American radio producer, television writer and screenwriter. He was known for the films The Eddie Cantor Story (1953), Away All Boats (1956), St. Louis Blues (1958), A Dog of Flanders (1960) and Misty (1961); and the TV series Wagon Train (1958–1965), Hazel (1963–1966), My Favorite Martian (1964), The Flying Nun (1968), Bewitched (1965). He died on 22 August 1987 in Santa Ana, California at age 78.

With director James Clark, with whom worked together on Dog of Flanders for Associated Producers Inc, later formed their own company, Gemtaur Productions. They also worked together in The Big Show, which was made with API.

Songs by Sinatra (1945–1947) was a 30-minute program aired on CBS on 12 September 1945, at 9 p.m, featuring Frank Sinatra. In December 1946 the director of the programm Mann Holiner was succeeded by Sherdeman.

== Filmography ==
=== Screenwriter ===
- Latitude Zero (1969)
- My Side of the Mountain (1969)
- The Flying Nun (1968)
- Family Affair (1967-1968)
- And Now Miguel (1966)
- Hazel (1963-1966)
- Bewitched (1965)
- Wagon Train (1958-1965)
- Island of the Blue Dolphins (1964)
- My Favorite Martian (1964)
- Misty (1961)
- The Big Show (1961)
- Hell to Eternity (1960)
- A Dog of Flanders (1960)
- Men Into Space (1959)
- Zane Grey Theater (1958)
- The Californians (1958)
- Maracaibo (1958)
- St. Louis Blues (1958)
- Away All Boats (1956)
- The Toy Tiger (1956)
- The McConnell Story (1955)
- Them! (1954)
- The Eddie Cantor Story (1953)
- The Winning Team (1952)
- Retreat, Hell! (1952)
- Scandal Sheet (1952)
- Breakthrough (1950)
- Lust for Gold (1949)

=== Producer ===
- Riding Shotgun (1954)
