= My Side of the Mountain =

1959 American children's novel by Jean George

- First edition cover
- Author: Jean George
- Language: English
- Series: Mountain
- Genre: Children's adventure novel
- Publisher: E. P. Dutton
- Publication date: 1959
- Publication place: United States of America
- Media type: Print (hardcover and paperback)
- Pages: 177
- Followed by: On the Far Side of the Mountain, Frightful's Mountain

My Side of the Mountain is a 1959 adventure novel written and illustrated by American writer Jean Craighead George. It features a boy who attempts to live in the Catskill Mountains after running away from home in New York City. The book earned a Newbery Honor in 1960 and, in 1969, it was loosely adapted as a film of the same name. The book was followed by two sequels.

== Plot summary ==
Sam Gribley is a 12-year-old boy who intensely dislikes living in his parents' cramped New York City apartment with his eight brothers and sisters. He decides to run away to his great-grandfather's abandoned farm in the Catskill Mountains to live in the wilderness. The novel begins in the middle of Sam's story, with Sam huddled in his treehouse home in the forest during a severe blizzard. Frightful, Sam's pet peregrine falcon, and The Baron, a weasel, share the home with him. In a flashback, Sam reminisces about how he came to be there.

Sam heard about his grandfather's abandoned farm near Delhi, New York, and learned wilderness survival skills by reading a book at the New York City Public Library. Sam's father permitted him to go to Delhi, and, while he didn't think that Sam was able to be self-sufficient, and believed he would return quickly, his father said that if he made it, to tell someone in town. Unable at first to locate the farm, Sam tries to survive on his own but finds his skills are not up to the task. He meets Bill, a man living in a cabin in the woods, who teaches him how to make a fire. Sam goes into town and is told where his grandfather's land is by the librarian, Miss Turner. Sam finds the farm but discovers the farmhouse is no longer standing.

Sam forages for edible plants and traps animals for food. He uses fire to make the interior of a hollow tree bigger. Seeing a peregrine falcon hunting for prey, Sam decides he wants a falcon as a hunting bird. Sam goes to town and reads up on falconry at the local public library. He steals a chick from a falcon's nest and names the bird Frightful. Later, Sam hides in the woods for two days after a forest ranger, spotting the smoke from Sam's cooking fire, comes to investigate.

In the fall, Sam makes a box trap to catch animals to eat, and catches a weasel. Sam calls the weasel The Baron for the regal way the animal moves about. When a poacher illegally kills a deer, Sam steals the carcass, smokes the meat, and tans the hides. Frightful proves to be very good at hunting. Sam prepares for winter by hunting, preserving wild grains and tubers, smoking fish and meat, and preparing storage spaces in hollowed-out trunks of trees. Finding another poached deer, Sam makes himself deerskin clothing to replace his worn-out clothes. Sam notices a raccoon digging for mussels in the creek and learns how to hunt for shellfish.

One day, Sam returns home and finds a man there. Believing the man is a criminal, he nicknames him "Bando" (an alternative version of "bandit"). The man is actually a professor of English literature and is lost. Bando spends 10 days with Sam building a raft, fishing, teaching him how to make jam, and showing him how to make a whistle out of a willow branch. Bando makes plans to return at Christmas.

Sam makes a clay fireplace to keep his home warm. He steals two more dead deer from local hunters to make more clothes, and begins rapidly storing as many fruits and nuts as he can. He almost dies after he insulates his home too well, trapping carbon monoxide inside. Sick with carbon monoxide poisoning, Sam barely gets out alive. Sam returns to town just before Christmas. He meets Tom Sidler, a teenager who ridicules his appearance. Bando returns, bringing many newspaper articles about the "wild boy" living in the forest. Sam is surprised on Christmas Day by the arrival of his father. They are overjoyed to see one another again. Sam learns how animals behave in winter, even during blizzards. He overcomes a vitamin deficiency by eating the right foods (mostly liver).

In the spring, Matt Spell, a local teenager who wants to be a reporter, arrives at Sam's treehouse home. Sam doesn't want to be interviewed, but offers Matt a deal: Matt can come live with him for a week if Matt will not reveal his location. Matt agrees. A few weeks later, Bando visits Sam and they build a guest house. Matt spends a week with Sam, and at the end tells Sam he broke his promise. A short time later, Tom Sidler visits the farm and Sam realizes he is desperate for human companionship.

In June, Sam is shocked to find his family has come to the Gribley land. His father announces that the family is moving there. Sam is happy at first, then also upset because it means the end of his self-sufficiency. As the novel ends, Sam concludes that life is about balancing his desire to live off the land with his desire to be with the people he loves.

== Characters ==
Sam Gribley
Sam is a 12-year-old boy who leaves home to live in the wilderness.
Dad Gribley
Sam's father lets Sam leave home, believing Sam will return after just a day or two. He is surprised at Sam's independence and tenacity.
Bill
Bill is a man who helps Sam to learn how to fish and make a fire.
Mrs. Thomas Fielder
Mrs. Fielder is a 97-year-old woman who forces Sam to help her pick strawberries for her jam, and betrays Sam by talking to reporters about him.
Miss Turner
Miss Turner is a librarian who befriends Sam. She works at a public library in Delhi, New York.
Frightful
Frightful is Sam's peregrine falcon. Sam trains Frightful to hunt for food that Sam can eat.
Baron Weasel
Baron Weasel is a weasel whom Sam accidentally traps.
Bando
Bando is an English professor who spends ten days with Sam while he (Bando) is lost in the woods. He becomes a father figure to Sam over the next year.
Jesse Coon James
Jesse is a raccoon whom Sam befriends. Sam learns how to hunt for mussels by watching Jesse.
Matt Spell
Matt is a teenage boy who writes for a local newspaper. He visits Sam and writes about him in the newspaper. He pretends to be a friend, but betrays Sam by reporting on him in the newspaper.
Aaron
Aaron is a Jewish songwriter who visits the wilderness near Sam's home to get inspiration.
Tom Sidler
Tom (or "Mr. Jacket", as Sam calls him) is a boy who lives in the village of Delhi, New York.
Mom Gribley
Mrs. Gribley is Sam's mother.

== Critical reception and impact ==
My Side of the Mountain won critical plaudits upon its release. Numerous reviewers praised the novel for its detailed depiction of the wilderness and animals, its unsentimental treatment of animals and nature, and its characters, their maturation, and development. The New York Times in 1959 gave the novel a solid review, calling it "a delightful flight from civilization, written with real feeling for the woods." Children's author Zena Sutherland, writing in her reference work Children & Books at the time, called Sam's development from immature, impulsive child into a mature young adult "wholly convincing". Ruth Hill Viguers, reviewing the book in The Horn Book Magazine, concluded in 1959, "I believe it will be read year after year, linking together many generations in a chain of well-remembered joy and refreshment."

In addition to being named to the Newbery Award Honors list, the book was also an American Library Association's Notable Book for 1959, was placed on the Hans Christian Andersen Award 1959 honors list, was given a Lewis Carroll Shelf Award citation (in 1965), and won the 1959 George G. Stone Center for Children's Books Award.

The book continued to be praised in the 1990s and 2000s. Book critic Eden Ross Lipson included it in her 2000 list of the best children's books, and said it "skillfully blends themes of nature, courage, curiosity, and independence". Librarians and authors Janice DeLong and Rachel Schwedt listed the book as one of a "core collection for small libraries" of the contemporary fiction section. Author Charles Wohlforth, writing in 2004, agreed that it was a classic of contemporary children's literature. By 1998, the book had been translated into numerous foreign languages, and visitors to the Cannon Free Library in Delhi, New York, often asked to see the abandoned farm where the novel was set. (The abandoned farm does not actually exist; the Gribley farm is entirely fictional.)

The book has not always won uncritical praise. In 1999, reviewer Mary Harris Russell noted that "the narrator, Sam, speaks with a tone more measured than that of most teenagers. That tone grates on some readers."

Robert F. Kennedy Jr. has cited My Side of the Mountain with inspiring him to become a falconer, which led him into a career in environmental law and environmental activism. Television host and pet advice author Marc Morrone and award-winning natural history author Ken Lamberton also credit the book with generating their interest in falconry.

Based on a 2007 online poll, the National Education Association listed the book as one of its "Teachers' Top 100 Books for Children". In 2012 it was ranked number 77 among all-time children's novels in a survey published by School Library Journal.

== Adaptations ==
A film adaptation directed by James B. Clark was released by Paramount Pictures in 1969. The film My Side of the Mountain is set in Toronto and the Notre Dame Mountains, a Quebec province section of the Appalachians, rather than in New York City and the Catskills.

== Series ==
A sequel written and illustrated by George was published in 1990, more than three decades after the original. Over the next 16 years there were three more sequels: a third novel illustrated by George and two picture books illustrated by Daniel San Souci. All the sequels were published by Dutton Children's Books, an imprint of Penguin Books since its acquisition of the original publisher E. P. Dutton in 1986.

- My Side of the Mountain (1959), illus. George OCLC 276356
- On the Far Side of the Mountain (1990), illus. George OCLC 20631814
- Frightful's Mountain (1999), illus. George OCLC 41445775
- Frightful's Daughter (2002), illus. Daniel San Souci, 32 pages OCLC 50556042
- Frightful's Daughter Meets the Baron Weasel (2007), illus. San Souci, 48 pp. OCLC 76863950

The three novels were issued in an omnibus edition that retains the original pagination, about 600 pages in sum: My Side of the Mountain Trilogy (2000). OCLC 45610215

In 2009, Dutton published A Pocket Guide to the Outdoors: Based on 'My Side of the Mountain', by George and her daughter Twig C. George. According to a library summary: "This guide to the outdoors provides advice and instructions on camping, building shelters, finding water, and cooking outdoors. Some activities may require adult supervision." Inside responsibility credits John C. George and T. Luke George as well. OCLC 311783530
