= Jon Locke =

American television and film actor

- Born: Joseph Lockey Yon; October 10, 1927; Orlando, Florida
- Died: October 19, 2013 (aged 86); Mission Hills, California
- Education: Florida State University
- Occupation: Actor

Joseph Lockey Yon, also known as credited as Jon Locke, (October 10, 1927 – October 19, 2013) was an American actor who appeared in many television and film westerns.

== Early life ==
Locke was borne in Orlando, Florida. He became involved in theater while earning his bachelor's degree at Florida State University. Locke enlisted in the United States Air Force, where he began performing in a play about Korean War pilots called Flame-Out.

== Career ==
His television credits included westerns, including Bonanza, Gunsmoke, and The Virginian, as well as non-western series such as The Bionic Woman, The Dukes of Hazzard, The Mary Tyler Moore Show, and Perry Mason. Locke had recurring roles as Officer Garvey on the 1950s crime drama series, Highway Patrol, and as a Sleestak leader in the NBC television series, Land of the Lost, during the 1970s. In a 1976 episode ("Abominable Snowman") of Land of the Lost he played the Snowman.

== Personal life ==
Outside of television, Locke played the banjo for an annual western film festival held in Lone Pine, California. He belonged to the Reel Cowboy, which are a social group of western actors who meet in the San Fernando Valley. In addition to acting, Locke worked as an office manager for a real estate firm in San Fernando.

== Death ==
Jon Locke, a longtime resident of Van Nuys, California, died from complications of a stroke at Holy Cross Medical Center in Mission Hills, California, on October 19, 2013, at the age of 86.

== Filmography ==
Year	Title	Role	Notes
1955	Gunsmoke	Beecher	"Kite's Reward"
1955	The Scarlet Coat	Lieutenant	Uncredited
1956	The Lieutenant Wore Skirts	Roger Wilkins	
1956	Battle Stations	Wallakowski	Uncredited
1956	Magnificent Roughnecks	Driver	
1956	Westward Ho the Wagons!	Ed Benjamin	
1957	Under Fire	Corp. John Crocker	
1960	Five Guns to Tombstone	Rusty Kolloway	
1961	Gun Fight	Saunders	
1972	Gunsmoke	Orval	"The Judgment"
1973	Cinderella Liberty	Go-Go Club Owner	
1974	Gunsmoke	Abe	"The Tarnished Badge"
1981	Years of the Beast	Pete	
1988	The Big Turnaround	Police Chief	
1989	Transylvania Twist	Mr. Sweeney	
2010	Mad Mad Wagon Party		(final film role)
