= My Side of the Mountain (film) =

1969 film by James B. Clark

- Theatrical release poster
- Directed by: James B. Clark
- Screenplay by: Ted Sherdeman; Jane Klove; Joanna Crawford
- Based on: My Side of the Mountain by Jean Craighead George
- Produced by: Robert B. Radnitz
- Starring: Teddy Eccles; Theodore Bikel
- Cinematography: Denys N. Coop
- Edited by: Alastair McIntyre; Peter Thornton
- Music by: Wilfred Josephs
- Distributed by: Paramount Pictures
- Release date: June 25, 1969
- Running time: 100 minutes
- Country: Canada
- Language: English
- Box office: $2 million (US/ Canada rentals)

My Side of the Mountain is a 1969 Panavision and Technicolor adventure film directed by James B. Clark. It is an adaptation of the 1959 novel of the same name, by Jean Craighead George. The film stars Teddy Eccles and Theodore Bikel. Based on the book, the film concerns Sam Gribley decides to leave his parents' apartment to go self-living in the Canadian woods with his raccoon pet Gus and trains a falcon and names her Frightful. He would later befriend Bando and Miss Turner during his stay at the woods.

== Plot ==
The story revolves around twelve-year-old Sam Gribley (Teddy Eccles), a devotee of Thoreau (as many were back in the 1960s). He decides to leave Toronto to spend time alone in the Canadian woods to see if he can make it as a self-sufficient spirit after his parents' promised summer trip doesn't pan out. He also wants to work on an algae experiment while he is there.

Sam's immediate companion is Gus, his pet raccoon, which lives with him in the city. He gathers supplies at a local store, hops on a bus, and heads down the 401 with Gus to what he calls "the Laurentian Mountains of Quebec". In actuality he ends up in the picturesque town of Knowlton, Quebec, southeast of Montreal, in the Notre Dame Mountains Range of the northern Appalachian Mountains chain along the eastern coast of North America from northern Georgia. Here he finds the perfect mountain stream and pond location to build a home in an old dead tree. He begins his long-planned algae experiments and proves his ability as a solitary young Thoreau living off the land and communing fully with nature.

Sam wants badly not to have to feel needful of the urban and modern world, however, the sight of a falcon overhead inspires his curiosity about falconry. He journeys back to Knowlton and to the local library, where the librarian and bird-enthusiast Miss Turner (Tudi Wiggins) supplies him with books on falconry. He steals a chick from a local falcon's nest. It, whom he names Frightful, becomes his new best friend and food supplier, after he teaches it to hunt.

One day, returning to his tree home, he finds an older man there. Bando (Theodore Bikel) is a wandering folk singer traveling the world in search of folk songs and traditions. They share survival ideas, lore with one another, and enlighten each other's worlds. They enjoy each other's pancake recipes. (Sam makes acorn pancakes and Bando makes great syrup.)

Sam and Bando bond over the summer, but as September's cold air approaches, Bando tells Sam that he has to leave before winter comes on. They climb the nearby mountain together and Bando says his good-byes. Sam is lonely.

Frightful is killed by an insensitive hunter. Sam is devastated, but still manages to survive as winter sets in. His bright demeanor returns as he witnesses the local fauna playing in the winter snow. He also has the warmth of his tree home in place after building a makeshift chimney out of clay from his pond.

Sam and Gus sleep by the fire as a terrible blizzard sweeps in. Soon their tree home is blanketed in snow, and without air they will suffocate in the smoke-filled chamber. Panic-stricken, Sam begins to dig his way through the snowed-in doorway to the outside air. Luckily, Bando and Miss Turner have decided to pay him a Christmas visit. They help dig him and Gus out. The four have a Christmas celebration and sing "Good King Wenceslas" over Bando's guitar playing.

Bando shows Sam newspaper reports of his parents' concern over their missing son. He decides that he should go home, knowing that he accomplished even more than he set out for. The four head off around the side of the mountain.

== Cast ==
- Teddy Eccles as Sam Gribley
- Theodore Bikel as Bando
- Tudi Wiggins as Miss Turner
- Paul Hébert as Hunter
- Cosette Lee as Apple Lady
- Ralph Endersby as Boy in Soda Fountain
- George Allan as Boy in Soda Fountain
- Dan McIlravey as Little Boy on Bus
- Frank Perry as Mr. Gribley
- Peggi Loder as Mrs. Gribley
- Karen Pearson as Prudence Gribley

== Production ==
The film was shot on location at Knowlton, Quebec and Toronto late in 1967.

Bikel said in his autobiography, Theo, "What was unusual about this production (My Side of the Mountain) was that they asked me not only to sing and play, but to write the songs as well. With the exception of one French-Canadian tune, 'Un Canadien Errant', for which I wrote the English lyrics, for all the others I wrote the words and music."

== Reception ==
On the review aggregator website Rotten Tomatoes, 71% of 7 critics' reviews are positive, with an average rating of 6.20/10.

== Home media ==
The film was released on VHS by Paramount Home Video in 1985. It was re-issued on VHS in 1995, under the Paramount Family Favorites label. The film was released on DVD as part of the Paramount Widescreen Collection in 2004.

== See also ==
- List of American films of 1969
- Survival film, about the film genre, with a list of related films
