= Raymie =

1960 film directed by Frank McDonald

- Theatrical poster
- Directed by: Frank McDonald
- Screenplay by: Mark Hanna
- Produced by: A. C. Lyles
- Starring: David Ladd; Julie Adams; John Agar
- Cinematography: Henry Cronjager Jr.
- Music by: Ronald Stein
- Production company: A. C. Lyles Productions
- Distributed by: Allied Artists Pictures
- Release date: July 5, 1960
- Running time: 72 minutes
- Country: USA
- Language: English
- Budget: $128,000

Raymie is a 1960 drama film directed by Frank McDonald and starring David Ladd. It is perhaps best known for its title song, which was sung by comedian Jerry Lewis and written by Ronald Stein.

== Plot ==
A nine-year-old boy and an experienced fisherman dream to catch a barracuda known as Old Moe. However, when the fish is caught, the boy and fisherman regret their act and see that the fish's life has meaning.

== Cast ==
- David Ladd as Raymie Boston
- Julie Adams as Helen
- John Agar as Ike
- Charles Winninger as R. J. Parsons
- Richard Arlen as Garber
- Frank Ferguson as Rex
- Ray Kellogg as Neil
- John Damler as John
- Jester Hairston as Veulo

== Production ==
The film was the first independent production of A.C. Lyles who raised half the budget from Continental Enterprises (a company whose biggest stockholder was Louis Wolfson) and half from Allied Artists. Allied agreed to distribute for seven years. Lyles persuaded Jerry Lewis to sing the theme song for free and John Wayne to endorse the film.

David Ladd was paid $25,000.
