= Max Dugan Returns =

1983 film by Herbert Ross

- Theatrical release poster
- Directed by: Herbert Ross
- Written by: Neil Simon
- Produced by: Herbert Ross; Neil Simon
- Starring: Marsha Mason; Jason Robards; Donald Sutherland; Matthew Broderick
- Cinematography: David M. Walsh
- Edited by: Richard Marks
- Music by: David Shire
- Distributed by: 20th Century Fox
- Release date: March 25, 1983
- Running time: 98 minutes
- Country: United States
- Language: English
- Box office: $17,613,720

Max Dugan Returns is a 1983 American comedy drama film written by Neil Simon and directed by Herbert Ross. Starring Jason Robards in the title role along with Marsha Mason and Donald Sutherland, it marks the film debuts of both Sutherland's son Kiefer and Matthew Broderick, and is both the last of five Simon-Ross collaborations and the last of Simon's films starring Mason (his wife at the time).

== Plot ==
In Venice, California, 15-year-old Michael McPhee awakens his mother, Nora, a widowed high school English schoolteacher, who has fallen asleep grading test papers. They venture from their ramshackle house to school in her dilapidated Volvo, which is stolen later that morning. She notifies police detective Brian Costello, who offers to drive her to work; upon arrival, she informs her students that they will have to redo the test they took earlier. Aware that she cannot afford a replacement car, Brian loans her a motorcycle, and spends the evening teaching her how to operate it. Late that night, her estranged father, Max Dugan, who abandoned his family 28 years earlier, appears at her door; he had been imprisoned when she was 9 years old and disappeared after serving 6 years of his sentence. He surprisingly announces his fatal heart condition and offers his estate of $687,000 ($2.1 million today), confessing to stealing the money from a mafia-controlled casino in Las Vegas, Nevada, after its owners appropriated his real estate holdings worth that same amount. The next morning, Max introduces himself to Michael as "Mr. Parker", the new tenant in the guest room. Although Nora corroborates Max's story, she later questions his alias; he rationalizes his long absence, to which she responds, "Affection would have been enough."

At school, Nora catches Celia, one of her best students, passing answers to her classmate Maria. Nora has conflicted feelings as Celia reveals their relationship as cousins, and the transgression occurred out of family duty. When she and Michael arrive home that afternoon to find new appliances in the kitchen and a modern home entertainment system in Michael's room, Nora angrily demands that Max return the items, which he insists are television game show prizes. Increasingly concerned that Max might corrupt Michael's morals and fearing exposure by either Brian or their meddlesome neighbor Mrs. Litke, she forbids Max from leaving the house. The following afternoon, at a Venice High School baseball game, Nora watches in anguish as Michael strikes out, losing yet another game for the team. Their gloom is compounded upon discovering that Brian's motorcycle has been stolen. However, they find a new Mercedes-Benz sedan in their driveway; she tells Max to return the car, and demands he explain his presence to Michael. Max privately reintroduces himself to Michael as ex-convict "Gus Wittgenstein", cellmate of the late Max Dugan, whose final request was that his grandson inherit his estate and study philosophy at a prominent East Coast university. After finding a diamond necklace on her dressing table, Nora softens her attitude toward her father's largesse, until Michael informs her of Max's latest alias. During a dinner date with Brian, Nora rationalizes her recent acquisitions. Following baseball practice the next day, Chicago White Sox batting coach Charley Lau, paid by Max, introduces himself to Michael and teaches him proper batting technique. After she and Michael return to a complete remodel of their house and a Great Dane named Plato, courtesy of Max, Nora succumbs to her father's generosity. Trailing him to a bank, Brian learns that Max has deposited $400,000 in cash in Nora's name and accuses Nora of being involved in illegal activity, but she feigns outrage and refuses to discuss the matter.

Nora informs Michael of Max's true identity, then pleads with Max to turn himself in to the police, anticipating leniency because of his poor health. Instead, Max, fearing police might charge Nora as his accomplice, departs the next morning, informing her and Michael via videocassette that he plans to spend his remaining days on a beach in Brazil with part of the money, donating the rest to them. That afternoon, Brian confronts Nora with the truth about Max and unsuccessfully inquires about his whereabouts. At a baseball game between the Venice High team and its rival, Santa Monica High, whose star pitcher is Brian's son, Kevin, both Charley and Max observe from a distance as Michael hits the winning homerun. Afterwards, Nora finally tells Brian everything that has occurred but insists that he postpone his manhunt until after lunch. She and Michael reach the parking lot to discover their car missing, but then see Max driving it away and waving goodbye.

== Cast ==
- Marsha Mason as Nora McPhee
- Jason Robards as Max Dugan
- Donald Sutherland as Brian Costello
- Matthew Broderick as Michael McPhee
- Dody Goodman as Mrs. Litke
- Sal Viscuso as Coach Roy
- Panchito Gómez as Luis
- Charley Lau as himself
- Aaron Sheridan as Vans Taylor
- Brian Part as Kevin Costello
- George P. Wilbur as Man in Car
- Tom Spratley as Truck Washer

Additionally, Kiefer Sutherland (in his film debut) briefly appears as Bill, Mike's school friend.

== Production ==
Max Dugan Returns marks the first of only three times that Donald Sutherland and his son Kiefer appeared together in a dramatic film project, the others being A Time to Kill and Forsaken, in the latter of which they both starred in the leads.

Matthew Broderick was cast in this film and Simon's play Brighton Beach Memoirs simultaneously.

Broderick's father James (born James Joseph Broderick III), a noted character actor, died on November 1, 1982, around four months prior to the film's release. Co-star Jason Robards, who was a friend of James, helped Matthew through his grief over the loss of his father.

Former professional baseball player Charley Lau appears as himself having been hired by Robards' character Dugan to coach Broderick's Michael to hit better for his high school team. At the time of the movie, Lau was the hitting coach for the Chicago White Sox.

This was the last movie that Mason and Simon collaborated on before their divorce.

== Reception ==
Roger Ebert of the Chicago Sun-Times gave the film 2.5 stars out of 4, calling it "watchable and sort of sweet."

Gene Siskel of the Chicago Tribune also awarded 2.5 stars out of 4 and wrote:

This sort of story is the kind of whimsical comedy that would have been made and made memorably in the '30s or '40s. But in this version only Robards has that old style panache to carry it off. He plays Max Dugan seriously, not as a clown, and it works beautifully. Other actors might have had fun with the part; Robards may have realized that there would be enough jokes happening around him that he didn't need to be silly. Mason, to her credit, manages to keep her whiny, please-love-me stereotypical movie persona in check; she's almost believable here as a teacher .... Max Dugan Returns is by no means without the trademark Simon touches that can cause one to wince. Wisecrack piles on top of wisecrack in some scenes to the point that you can't see any of the characters. And the film's ending is so predictable that you will be putting on your coat at least two or three minutes before the end credits start to roll.

Janet Maslin of The New York Times wrote "Simon's original screenplay is fast and buoyant, and Herbert Ross's direction shows off the abundant jokes to their best possible advantage. There are certainly some questionable ingredients to the story, but you're not likely to notice them while the film is under way. You're likely to be laughing."

Variety described the film as "a consistently happy comedic fable which should please romanticists drawn again to another teaming of Neil Simon, Marsha Mason and Herbert Ross."

David Ansen of Newsweek wrote "It's a cute fantasy, and the players are certainly appealing. But Simon overplays his hand. Having created living and breathing comic characters, he starts to suffocate them inside an increasingly mechanized plot. The cuteness gets a bit out of hand."

On the review aggregator website Rotten Tomatoes, 64% of 14 critics' reviews are positive.

== In popular culture ==
In the "Three Directors" episode of Family Guy (season 16, episode 5, first broadcast November 5, 2017), in which the story of Peter Griffin getting fired from his job at the Pawtucket Brewery is told as if directed by three different well-known film directors, the middle section parodies the style of Wes Anderson. In it, Peter's character presents a play, "Max Dugan Returns", in which the entirety of the play consists of Peter (as Max Dugan) entering the stage, Chris Griffin saying "Max, you've returned!", and Peter responding "I have".

== See also ==
- List of American films of 1983
