= A Dog of Flanders (1959 film) =

1960 film directed by James B. Clark

- Directed by: James B. Clark
- Screenplay by: Ted Sherdeman
- Based on: A Dog of Flanders; 1872 novel by Ouida
- Produced by: Robert B. Radnitz
- Starring: David Ladd; Donald Crisp; Theodore Bikel
- Cinematography: Otto Heller, B.S.C.
- Edited by: Benjamin Laird
- Music by: Paul Sawtell; Bert Shefter; Santa Cecilia Academy Orchestra and Chorus of Rome
- Production company: Associated Producers Inc
- Distributed by: 20th Century Fox
- Release date: March 17, 1960
- Running time: 96 minutes
- Country: United States
- Language: English
- Budget: $600,000
- Box office: $3 million

A Dog of Flanders is a 1959 American drama film directed by James B. Clark, with stars David Ladd, Donald Crisp and Theodore Bikel. It is based on the 1872 novel of the same name by Ouida. It was released on March 17, 1960, by 20th Century Fox in CinemaScope and Color by De Luxe.

Unlike the novel, which has a tragic end; also like the 1935 different RKO film as well as the 1999 Warner Bros./Woodbridge film, the film has a happy ending for the boy and his dog.

"Patrasche" is played by Spike the Mastador, best known for playing the title character in the 1957 Disney film Old Yeller.

== Plot ==
The emotional story of a boy, his grandfather, and his dog. The boy's dream of becoming a great classical painter appears shattered when his loving grandfather dies.

== Cast ==
- David Ladd as Nello Daas
- Donald Crisp as Jehan Daas
- Theodore Bikel as Piet Van Gelder
- Max Croiset as Cogez the miller
- Monique Ahrens as Corrie
- Siobhan (incorrectly credited as "Siohban") Taylor as Alois Cogez
- Gijsbert Tersteeg as the landlord
- John Soer as the peddler
- Katherine Holland as the miller's wife
- Lo van Hensbergen as the priest
- Spike the Mastador as Patrasche
- Hans Tiemeyer
- Maxim Hamel
- John De Freese
- Mathieu van Eysden
- Katja Berndsen
- Heleen van Meurs
- Ulla Larsen

== Production ==
Robert L. Lippert enjoyed success with a children's film starring David Ladd called The Sad Horse.

The film was announced in March 1959. Robert L. Lippert says the film was originally shot in black and white "but everything was so beautiful so we changed it to color."

Filming started June 22, 1959. The film was shot in Holland and Belgium.

It included a 12-minute scene where Theodore Bikel gives a painting lesson. "Everybody thought they were crazy when he did that", said producer Radnitz. "But the kids loved it."

== Comic book adaptation ==
- Dell Four Color #1088 (April 1960)

== Reception ==
The film was one of Lippert's most successful films, commercially making over $3 million. Hedda Hopper called it "the sleeper of the year."

Lippert bought a story, Gallus to make as a follow-up for Clark and Ladd. However the film was not made. They ended up making Misty.

Writer Ted Sherdeman and director Clark later formed their own company, Gemtaur.

The film was first in the children's film category at the Venice Film Festival.

== See also ==
- List of American films of 1960
