= Carol Christensen =

American film actress (1937–2005)

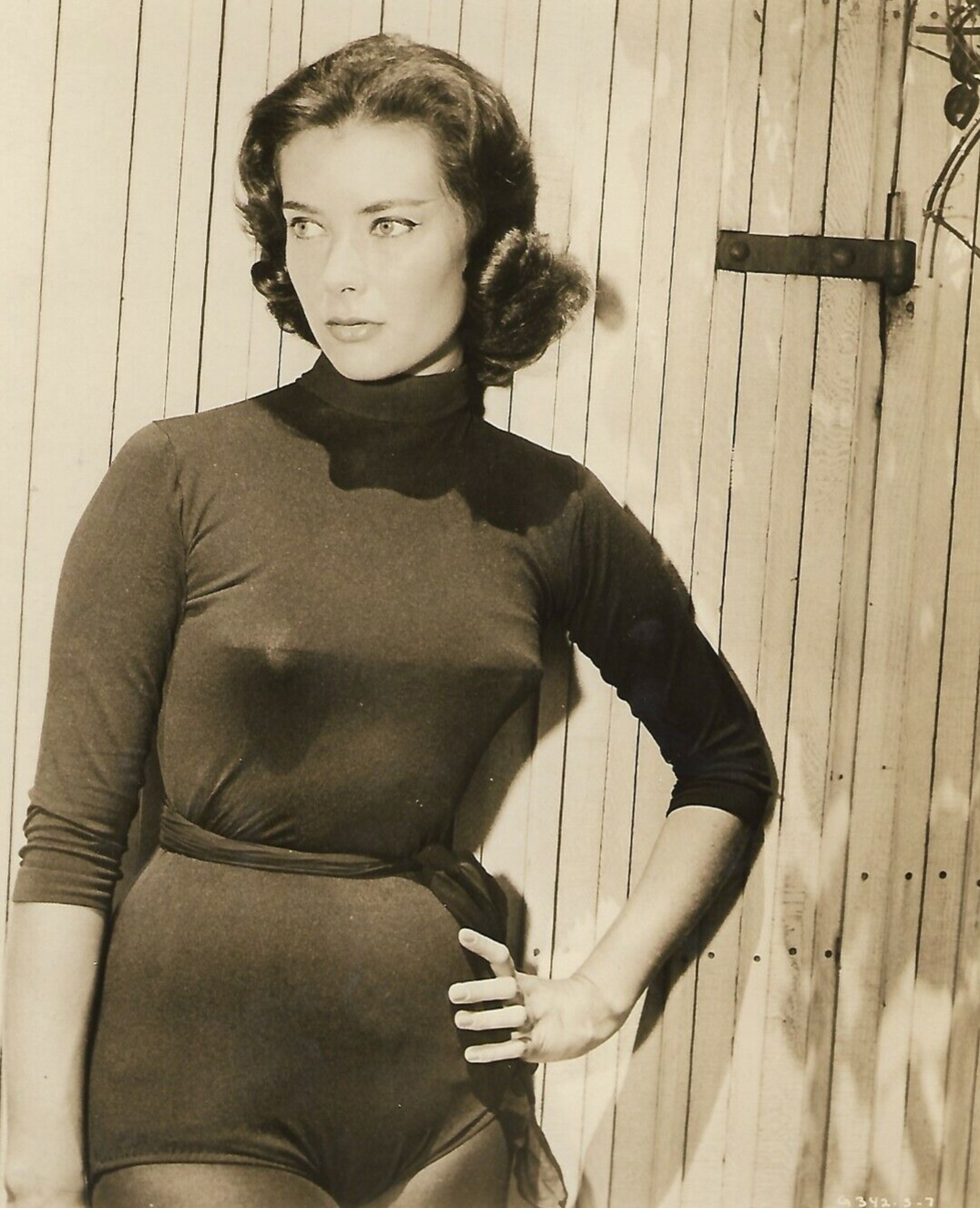
- Christensen in 1960
- Born: September 14, 1937; Detroit, Michigan, U.S.
- Died: June 4, 2005 (aged 67); Rancho Mirage, California. U.S.
- Education: Southfield High School
- Occupations: Actress; model
- Years active: 1960–1963
- Known for: The Three Stooges in Orbit; Swingin' Along; The Big Show; Freckles
- Spouse: Dwayne Hickman (m. 1963; div. 1972)
- Children: 2

Carol Christensen (September 14, 1937 – June 4, 2005) was an American actress and former model. Born in Detroit, Michigan, she appeared in several films and television shows between 1960 and 1963.

== Early years ==
Christensen attended Southfield High School in Southfield, Michigan, planning to be an engineer like her father, William Christensen. While she was in high school, she worked at a school of music and dance. After graduation, she worked as a secretary for American Motors Corporation. After an advertising photographer used a photograph of her in an ad, she went into modeling for an agency in Manhattan.

== Career ==
Christensen began her career as a model in the late 1950s and was voted Miss New York Summer Festival in 1958. She was one of six finalists in the 1960 Miss Rheingold contest.

Christensen portrayed Carol Danforth, daughter of eccentric Professor Danforth (Emil Sitka) in the Three Stooges feature film The Three Stooges in Orbit. She also appeared on the television shows Ensign O'Toole and The Many Loves of Dobie Gillis and in the circus film The Big Show, a 1961 drama starring Esther Williams and Cliff Robertson. She starred in a 1960 film drama, Freckles, and played the girlfriend of Tommy Noonan in a 1962 musical-comedy film, Swingin' Along.

Christensen died of cancer in Rancho Mirage, California on June 4, 2005.

== Personal ==
Christensen was married to The Many Loves of Dobie Gillis star Dwayne Hickman from 1963 to 1972. They had one child.
