= Teddy Eccles =

American actor (born 1955)

- Born: Theodore Edward Eccles; June 9, 1955 (age 71); Los Angeles County, California, U.S.
- Other name: Ted Eccles
- Occupations: Actor; Executive producer
- Years active: 1960–1977

Theodore Edward Eccles (born June 9, 1955) is an American former child actor and executive producer.

== Career ==
Eccles performed many of his best known roles as a child actor. He appeared in several television series and feature films in the 1960s and 1970s. Eccles may be best known for his starring role in the 1969 film My Side of the Mountain and the voice of Aaron in the television holiday special The Little Drummer Boy. In his twenties, he was one of the shrunken protagonists, or "Shrinkees", in the fantasy adventure series Dr. Shrinker, a segment on the children's television series The Krofft Supershow which was broadcast on Saturday mornings.

He later became executive producer of the TV show Flip My Food.

== Filmography ==
Year	Title	Role	Notes
1960	Shirley Temple's Storybook	Christopher Robin	TV series, episode: "Winnie-the-Pooh"
1962	Mister Ed	Bobby Ainsworth	TV series, episode: "No Horses Allowed"
1964	The Munsters	Wilbur Ramsey	TV series, episode: "Herman the Great"
1967	The Big Valley	Johnny Kilbain (Son of Jack Kilbain)	TV series, episode: "The Price of Victory"
1967	The Herculoids	Dorno (voice)	Animated TV series
1967	The Beverly Hillbillies	Milby Drysdale (Nephew of banker Milburn Drysdale)	TV series, episode: "Little Monster"
1968	The Little Drummer Boy	Aaron (voice)	TV special
1969	Anderson and Company	Ansford Anderson	TV movie
1969	Daniel Boone	Jason	TV series, episode: "Hannah Comes Home"
1969	My Three Sons	Frankie (Son of Harry Palmer)	TV series, S9 Ep25: "The Matchmakers"
1969	My Side of the Mountain	Sam Gribley	Feature film
1970	The Phynx	Wee Johnny Wilson	Feature film
1970	San Francisco International	Davey Scott	TV movie/series pilot
1972	The Honkers	Bobby Lathrop	Feature Film
1974	Bad Ronald	Duane Matthews	TV movie
1974	If I Love You, Am I Trapped Forever?	Alan Bennett	TV movie
1974	M*A*S*H	Private Chapman	TV series, episode: "Private Charles Lamb"
1974	The Waltons	Michael West	TV series, episodes: "The Ring" and "The First Day"
1976	Eleanor and Franklin	Franklin Roosevelt (age 16)	TV movie
1976	Dr. Shrinker	Brad Fulton	Part of Krofft Supershow
1977	Quincy, M.E.	Chris Davis	TV series, episode: "The Deadly Connection"

== Bibliography ==
- Holmstrom, John. The Moving Picture Boy: An International Encyclopaedia from 1895 to 1995. Norwich, Michael Russell, 1996, p. 309-310.
