= Mary White (film) =

- Genre: Drama
- Based on: biographical material by William Allen White
- Teleplay by: Caryl Ledner
- Directed by: Jud Taylor
- Starring: Ed Flanders; Fionnula Flanagan; Kathleen Beller
- Music by: Leonard Rosenman
- Country of origin: United States
- Original language: English

Production
- Producers: Terence Nelson; Robert B. Radnitz
- Cinematography: Bill Butler
- Editor: Fred A. Chulack
- Running time: 102 minutes
- Production company: Radnitz/Mattel Productions

Original release
- Network: ABC
- Release: November 18, 1977

Mary White is a 1977 made-for-TV period biographical movie directed by Jud Taylor about American newspaper editor and author William Allen White (played by Ed Flanders) and his teenage daughter Mary (played by Kathleen Beller), who died at age 16 in a horseback riding accident. The film is based on the true story of White's daughter Mary Katherine, who died in 1921 and was the subject of a well-known eulogy written by her father.

Caryl Ledner won the Emmy Award for Best Teleplay, Movie-For-Television, in the 1977-78 season. The film often appeared on television in the 1980s, and is now on DVD.

== Plot ==
In Emporia, Kansas, in the late 1910s and early 1920s, Mary Katherine White, a teenage girl, comes of age. Having grown up in wealth and privilege, as a result she meets famous people of the day. In 1921, at age 16, she dies in a riding accident. Her story is recounted in flashback style by her father, a famous editor, author and publisher.

== Cast ==
- Ed Flanders - William Allen White
- Fionnula Flanagan - Sallie White
- Kathleen Beller - Mary White
- Tim Matheson - William L. White
- Donald Moffat - Sir James Barrie
- Diana Dill - Jane Addams
- Kaki Hunter - Selina
