= The Little Ark =

- Theatrical release poster
- Directed by: James B. Clark
- Written by: Jan de Hartog (novel); Joanna Crawford
- Starring: Theodore Bikel; Geneviève Ambas; Philip Frame
- Cinematography: Austin Dempster; Denys Coop
- Edited by: Fred A. Chulack
- Music by: Fred Karlin
- Production company: Cinema Center Films
- Distributed by: National General Pictures
- Release date: March 1972
- Running time: 100 min.
- Country: United States
- Language: English

The Little Ark is a 1972 children's film directed by James B. Clark, produced by Robert B. Radnitz for Cinema Center Films and released theatrically in the U.S. by National General Pictures. It stars Geneviève Ambas and Philip Frame, as children, believed to be World War II orphans, that befriend a local fisherman (Theodore Bikel) after he saves them from a flood.

== Cast ==
- Theodore Bikel as The Captain
- Geneviève Ambas as Adinda
- Philip Frame as Jan
- Max Croiset as Father Grijpma
- Truus Dekker as Mother Grijpma

== Awards ==
Composer Fred Karlin and lyricist Megan Karlin were nominated for the Academy Award for Best Original Song for "Come Follow, Follow Me".

== Reception ==
In Leonard Maltin's Movie Guide, he gave the film three stars and wrote, "Another good children's film from producer Robert Radnitz; this one concerns two Dutch youngsters who try to find their father after being separated from him during a flood."

== See also ==
- List of American films of 1972
