= The Treasure of Jamaica Reef =

1975 film by Virginia L. Stone

- A poster bearing the film's American reissue title: Evil in the Deep
- Directed by: Virginia L. Stone
- Written by: J.A.S. McCrombie
- Based on: Diary of a Diver by John Walker
- Produced by: J.A.S. McCrombie; Virginia L. Stone
- Starring: Stephen Boyd; Roosevelt Grier; David Ladd; Cheryl Ladd; Chuck Woolery
- Cinematography: Alec McCrombie; Clive Trenchard
- Edited by: Jim Bryan; Virginia L. Stone
- Music by: Christopher L. Stone
- Production companies: D & R Film Project; Producers Group Inc.
- Distributed by: Golden Films
- Release date: March 1975
- Running time: 96 minutes
- Countries: United States; Grenada; Jamaica
- Language: English

The Treasure of Jamaica Reef is a 1975 film directed by Virginia L. Stone. It is an adventure-drama about the search for a Spanish Galleon filled with treasure, that sank over 200 years ago. The film is an international co-production between the United States, Grenada and Jamaica.

The film is also known as Evil in the Deep (American reissue title).

== Cast ==
- Stephen Boyd as Hugo Graham
- David Ladd as Joshua Owens
- Chuck Woolery as Victor Spivak
- Roosevelt Grier as Asper
- Darby Hinton as Darby
- Cheryl Ladd as Zappy
- Art Metrano as Waiter
- Clive Trenchyard as Coffin client
- Edsel Keith as Jamaican Lawyer
- Derek Rhoen as Robin
- Gunter Perezak as Harvey
- Herbie Round as Copter Pilot
- Mark Trenchard as Devo

== See also ==
- List of American films of 1975
