= Maracaibo (film) =

1958 film by Cornel Wilde

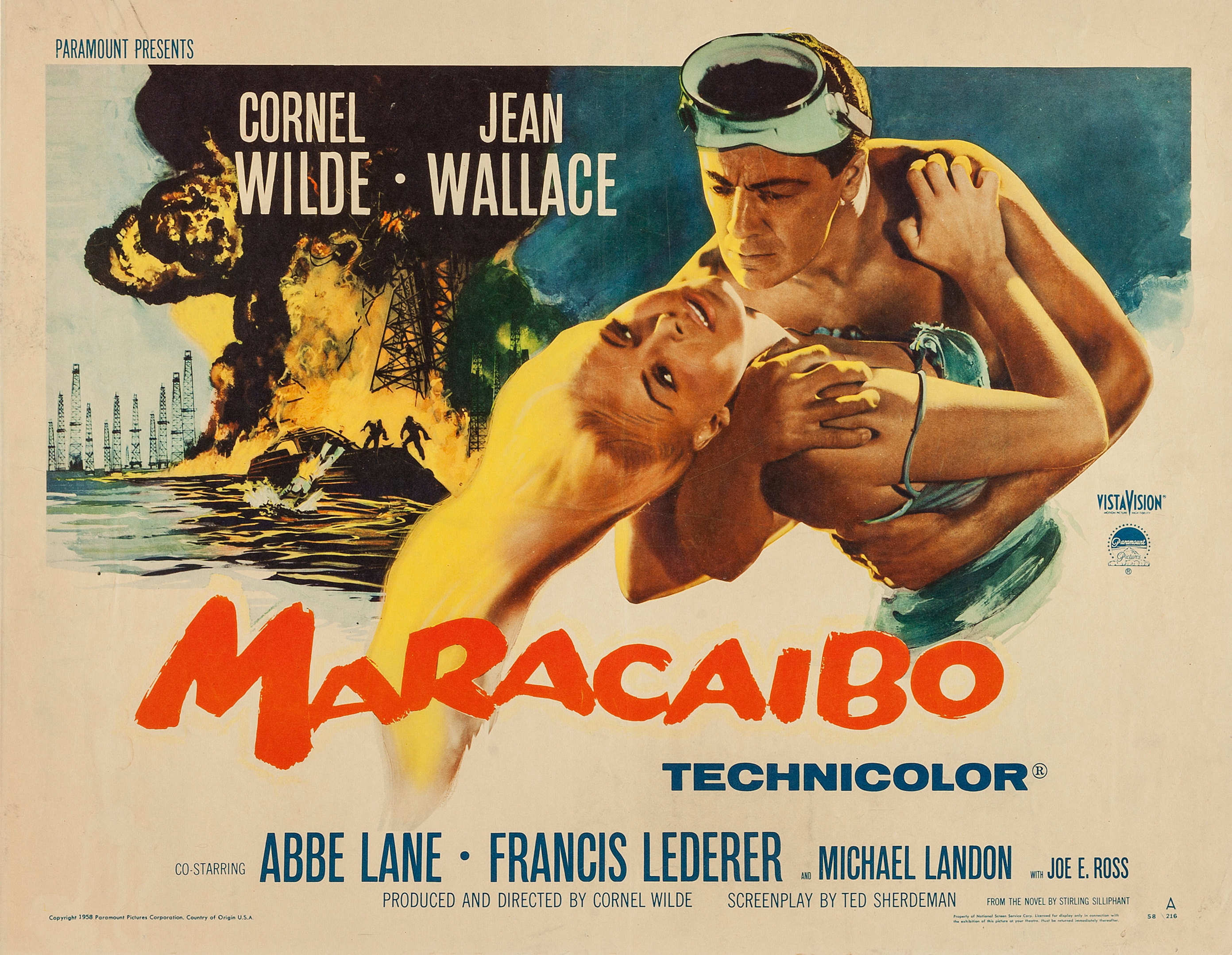
- Lobby card for the film
- Directed by: Cornel Wilde
- Screenplay by: Ted Sherdeman
- Based on: Maracaibo; 1955 novel by Stirling Silliphant
- Produced by: Cornel Wilde
- Starring: Cornel Wilde; Jean Wallace; Abbe Lane; Francis Lederer; Michael Landon; Joe E. Ross
- Cinematography: Ellsworth Fredericks
- Edited by: Everett Douglas
- Music by: Laurindo Almeida
- Production company: Theodora Productions
- Distributed by: Paramount Pictures
- Release date: May 21, 1958
- Running time: 88 minutes
- Country: United States
- Language: English

Maracaibo is a 1958 American drama film directed by Cornel Wilde and written by Ted Sherdeman. The film stars Cornel Wilde, Jean Wallace, Abbe Lane, Francis Lederer, Michael Landon and Joe E. Ross. The film was released on May 21, 1958, by Paramount Pictures.

== Plot ==
Red Adair–type former Navy Frogman Vic Scott is on vacation in Venezuela when a huge oil fire at a well of his rich friend erupts. While romancing a newly-famous novelist from New York a colleague locates him and persuades him to help put out the blaze, just as theirs is starting.

More romance than adventure for the first two-thirds of the film, Maracaibo ultimately settles down to dramatic scenes of underwater work to extinguish the fire before a huge storm arrives. The action is interrupted from time to time to explore the romantic angle, including scenes between Abbe Lane's character and Cornel Wilde's, who were lovers only a few years prior—though she is now engaged to the rich oil baron.

Will her past be revealed? Will the New York author get her man? Will Vic Scott put out the fire near Maracaibo before it reaches the city, then finally settle down?

== Cast ==
- Cornel Wilde as Vic Scott
- Jean Wallace as Laura Kingsley
- Abbe Lane as Elena Holbrook
- Francis Lederer as Miguel Orlando
- Michael Landon as Lago Orlando
- Joe E. Ross as Milt Karger
- Jack Kosslyn as Raoul Palma
- Lillian Buyeff as Mrs. Felicia Montera
- George Ramsey as Mr. Ricardo Montera
- Martín Vargas as Flamenco Dancer
- Maruja as Cabaret Dancer
- Carmen D'Antonio as Cabaret Dancer

== Production ==
The film was based on a novel by Stirling Silliphant which he had written in Cuba. Film rights were bought by Universal who intended to turn it into a vehicle for Rock Hudson and Jane Wyman and Ted Sherdeman wrote a script. Cornel Wilde spotted Michael Landon on television and signed him to a three-picture contract. In September 1957 the rights went to Paramount, who gave it to Cornel Wilde's company, Theodora. Wilde would produce, direct and star.

Silliphant later called it "a perfectly dreadful, stinking film... with a screenplay that must have been written in the men's room of the Hollywood Knickerbocker."

Publicity photos for the film.

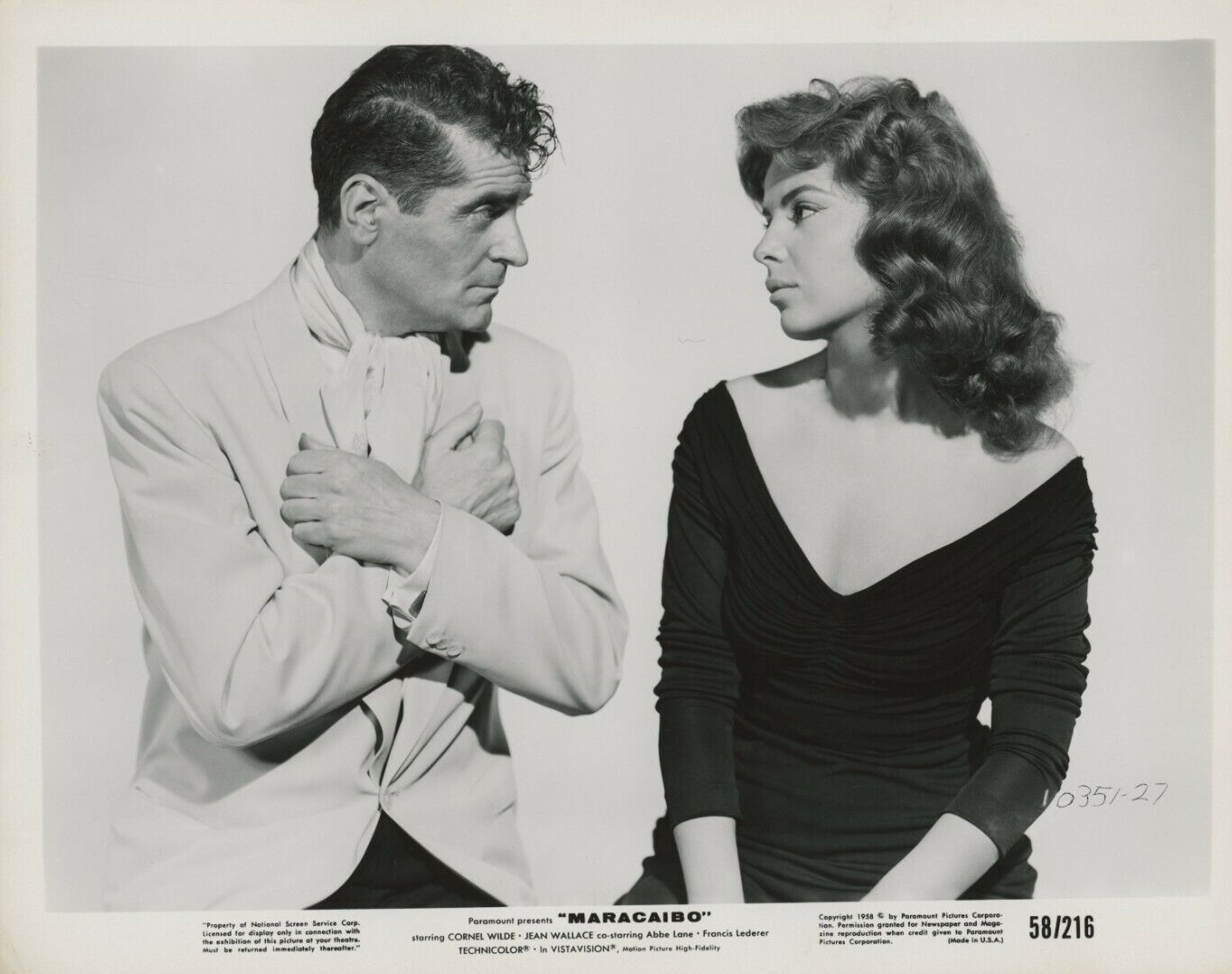

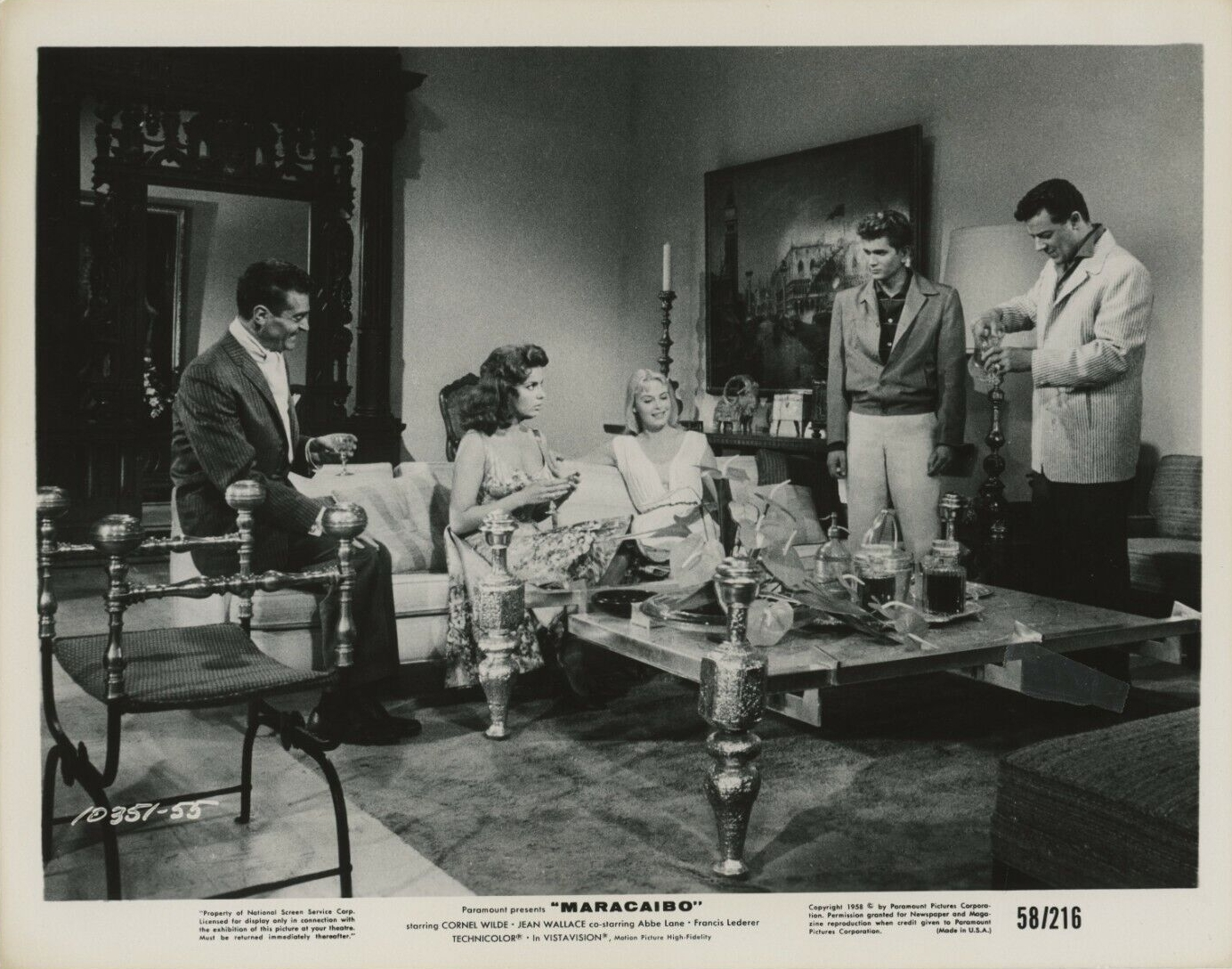
