= Charlotte (1981 film) =

- Theatrical release poster
- Directed by: Frans Weisz
- Written by: Frans Weisz; Judith Herzberg
- Starring: Birgit Doll; Derek Jacobi; Elisabeth Trissenaar; Brigitte Horney; Max Croiset; Peter Capell
- Cinematography: Theo van de Sande; Jerzy Lipman
- Edited by: Clarissas Ambach
- Distributed by: Concorde Film (Netherlands)
- Release date: 26 February 1981
- Running time: 96 minutes
- Countries: Netherlands; West Germany
- Languages: German, Dutch

Charlotte is a 1981 West German-Dutch film directed by Frans Weisz. It is a biography about German-Jewish painter Charlotte Salomon, who died in the Holocaust.

== Plot ==
In January 1939, Charlotte Salomon decides to flee her home in Berlin. The Nazis have been in power in Germany since 1933, and anti-Semitism has been growing increasingly intense. When German troops invade Poland on September 1, 1939, and the British and French declare war on Germany, Charlotte’s grandmother attempts suicide. Charlotte prevents the attempt but realizes that depression runs in the family. Her own mother had taken her own life as well. For Charlotte, that realization is a turning point. Will she succumb to the seemingly hereditary depression, or will she resist it?

Charlotte is an artist, who studied at the Academy of Fine Arts in Berlin. Supported by Daberlohn, her stepmother’s singing teacher, Charlotte begins to express her life and feelings through paintings and gouaches. Her memories of her father, a surgeon who resisted Nazi attempts to destroy Jewish culture, and of her stepmother who could sing so beautifully, all come flooding back. Her love for Daberlohn, who teaches her to live and to suffer, is also expressed in the 1,300 drawings and gouaches titled "Life? or Theater?". Creating the series exhausts her, but driven by her determination not to succumb to depression, she manages to complete the work in 1942. She leaves her opus in safekeeping in Villefranche and flees. In 1943, she is arrested and deported to Auschwitz, where she is murdered that same year.

== Cast ==
- Birgit Doll ... Charlotte Salomon
- Elisabeth Trissenaar ... Paulinka
- Brigitte Horney ... Grandma
- Max Croiset... Albert
- Peter Capell ... Grandfather
- Derek Jacobi ... Daberlohn
- Buddy Elias ... Herr Schwartz
- Peter Faber ... Frits Blech
- Eric Vaessen ... Herr Deutscher
- Maria Machado ... Frau Schwartz
- Shireen Strooker ... Mukki
- Lous Hensen ... Frau Deutscher
- Yoka Berretty ... Frau Morgan
- Patricia Hodge ... Teacher
- Irene Jarosch ... Magda

== Reception ==
Salomon's biographer Mary Lowenthal Felstiner calls the film "poignant", though she thought Derek Jacobi's performance as Daberlohn "overblown".
