= Where the Lilies Bloom =

1974 drama film by William A. Graham

- Film poster
- Directed by: William A. Graham
- Screenplay by: Earl Hamner, Jr.
- Based on: Where the Lilies Bloom by Bill and Vera Cleaver
- Produced by: Robert B. Radnitz
- Starring: Julie Gholson; Harry Dean Stanton
- Cinematography: Urs Furrer
- Edited by: O. Nicholas Brown
- Music by: Earl Scruggs
- Production company: Radnitz/Mattel Productions
- Distributed by: United Artists
- Release dates: April 10, 1974 (San Francisco); June 7, 1974 (New York City)
- Running time: 97 minutes
- Country: United States
- Language: English

Where the Lilies Bloom is a 1974 American drama film directed by William A. Graham and starring Julie Gholson, Harry Dean Stanton, Rance Howard and Jan Smithers. Based on the 1969 novel of the same name by Bill and Vera Cleaver, it follows four underage siblings in Appalachia who attempt to conceal the death of their widowed father Roy to avoid being separated.

== Plot ==
The Luther family are poor sharecroppers living in the mountains of North Carolina. The father, Roy Luther is sickly, and he asks the second eldest daughter, Mary Call, to take over his role of father when he passes on. He instructs her not to tell anyone when he dies as doctors, undertakers and preachers "just take money". Should the authorities discover he is dead, the children would be split up and put in foster homes since none of them are of legal age. Their landlord Kiser Pease is interested in marrying the eldest daughter Devola. Roy won't allow the marriage and he makes Mary Call promise she won't let it happen after he dies. Mary Call and younger brother Romey help Kiser when he is sick with pneumonia and Kiser agrees to sign the land back over to the Luther family.

When Roy dies, the children bury him on a mountainside in an unmarked grave, then go to elaborate lengths to keep anyone from finding out he is dead. The children rehearse over and over about what to say if asked about their father. Kiser continues his courtship of Devola and Mary Call does everything she can to thwart his pursuit of her.

The Luther children scrimp and do all they can to eke out a living for themselves, even selling roots and herbs gathered from their land to the local pharmacist Mr. Connell to use in medicines. Mary Call takes refuge in her journal and the essays she writes for school assignments catch the eye of her teacher Miss Fleetie who urges her not to waste her talent with words by settling for "a life in the hills".

When Kiser lands in the hospital after having been hit by a truck, his nosy sister Goldie comes to the Luther house and demands they vacate the property. She says the paper that Kiser signed giving the Luthers their land is worthless and orders them out in 48 hours. With few options left, a desperate Mary Call visits Kiser in the hospital and offers herself to him in marriage. Kiser would rather marry Devola and a distraught Mary Call blurts out that Roy is dead. She threatens to kill Kiser if he tells anyone and storms out. Finally, Mary Call agrees to let Kiser marry Devola. Mary Call realizes that Kiser was not so bad after all. After Kiser and Devola marry, the entire Luther family live together in Kiser and Devola's home.

== Cast ==
- Julie Gholson as Mary Call Luther
- Harry Dean Stanton as Kiser Pease
- Jan Smithers as Devola Luther
- Matthew Burril as Romey Luther
- Helen Harmon as Ima Dean Luther
- Rance Howard as Roy Luther
- Tom Spratley as Mr. Connell
- Helen Bragdon as Mrs. Connell
- Alice Beardsley as Goldie Pease
- Sudie Bond as Miss Fleetie
- Bob Cole as Hyder Graybeal
- Martha Nell Hardy as Rose Graybeal
- Resi Sinclair as Alma Graybeal
- Gregg Parrish as Gaither Graybeal
- Janine Hughes as First Girl
- Karen Moody as Second Girl
- Tom Guinn as Buck Morris
- George Stenhouse as Minister

== Production ==
This is the second film produced by Robert B. Radnitz and Mattel. The film was shot in Watauga County (towns of Boone and Blowing Rock), Ashe County (towns of West Jefferson and Lansing), and in Avery County (towns of Elk Park and Banner Elk), North Carolina. Soundtrack music is by Earl Scruggs. Children from local elementary schools were recruited to act in the film.

== Release ==
=== Home media ===
As of 2020, the film is available for streaming on Amazon Prime. On July 19, 2022, it was released on both DVD and Blu-ray by Kino Lorber and Scorpion Releasing.
