= The Silent Call =

1961 film

- Theatrical release poster
- Directed by: John A. Bushelman
- Screenplay by: Tom Maruzzi
- Story by: Hal G. Evarts
- Produced by: Leonard A. Schwartz
- Starring: Gail Russell; David McLean; Roger Mobley; Roscoe Ates; Milton Parsons; Dal McKennon; Spike
- Cinematography: Kay Norton
- Edited by: Carl Pierson
- Music by: Richard D. Aurandt
- Production company: Associated Producers Inc
- Distributed by: 20th Century Fox
- Release date: May 1961
- Running time: 63 minutes
- Country: United States
- Language: English

The Silent Call is a 1961 American drama film directed by John A. Bushelman and written by Tom Maruzzi. The film stars Gail Russell (in her final role), David McLean, Roger Mobley, Roscoe Ates, Milton Parsons and Dal McKennon.

It was released in May 1961, by 20th Century Fox.

== Plot ==
When Joe and Flore Brancato move from Nevada to Los Angeles, their young son, Guy, is heartbroken because there is not enough room in the small family car (rear-engine 1957 Renault Dauphine) for his huge pet dog, Pete. The animal is left behind with a somewhat unsavory neighbor, but Guy's parents promise that Pete will be sent for as soon as possible. The dog breaks away, however, tries to follow the car, and becomes lost. Guy blames his parents and becomes sullen and embittered; but the resourceful animal continues his 1,000-mile journey, hitchhiking rides and making progress despite bad weather, until eventually he arrives in Los Angeles. After creating a traffic jam, Pete is reunited with the overjoyed Guy.

== Cast ==
- Gail Russell as Flore Brancato
- David McLean as Joe Brancato
- Roger Mobley as Guy Brancato
- Roscoe Ates as Sid
- Milton Parsons as Mohammed
- Dal McKennon as Old Man
- Sherwood Keith as Johnny
- Jack Younger as Muscles
- Rusty Wescoatt as Moose
- Spike as Pete
