= Dood Water =

1934 film

- Directed by: Gerard Rutten
- Written by: Simon Koster, Gerard Rutten
- Distributed by: Metro-Goldwyn-Mayer
- Release date: 26 October 1934
- Running time: 106 minutes
- Country: Netherlands
- Language: Dutch

Dood Water is a 1934 Dutch drama film directed by Gerard Rutten.

== Plot ==
A conflict erupts between old and young fishermen over the catch in the Zuiderzee. When the Afsluitdijk is completed, they speak of 'dead water' and bemoan the fact that things will never be the same again. The fishermen try desperately to destroy the dike with shovels, even going so far as to try to blow it up with explosives. Willem de Geus, the film's main character, dies during an explosion at the Afsluitdijk.

== Cast ==
- Jan Musch ... Willem de Geus
- Theo de Maal ... Jaap de Meeuw (as Teo de Maal)
- Betsy Ranucci-Beckman ... Aaf de Meeuw
- Arnold Marlé... Dirk Brak
- Max Croiset ... Jan Brak
- Helga Gogh ... Maartje Brak
- Johan Schilthuyzen
- Jules Verstraete

== Reception ==
The film won the Coppa Istituto Luce at Venice Film Festival (1934), for best cinematography, by Andor von Barsy.

Writing for The Spectator, Graham Greene praised the film's documentary prologue as "an exciting piece of pure cinema", and commented that the story which follows "has some of the magnificent drive one felt behind the classic Russian films, behind Earth and The General Line: no tiresome 'message', but a belief in the importance of a human activity truthfully reported". Greene also noted, however, that "the photography is uneven: at moments it is painfully 'arty', deliberately out of focus".
