= Plato A. Skouras =

American film producer

- Born: March 7, 1930; Rye, New York, U.S.
- Died: July 4, 2004 (aged 74); Brinkley, Arkansas, U.S.
- Occupation: Film producer

Plato Alexander Skouras (March 7, 1930 – July 4, 2004) was an American film producer. He was the son of Spyros Skouras.

Skouras worked in theatres and became a production assistant in Hollywood at 20th Century Fox. He became a producer and, later, a restaurant owner.

== Select credits ==
- Apache Warrior (1957)
- Under Fire (1957)
- Sierra Baron (1958)
- Villa!! (1958)
- Francis of Assisi (1961)
