= Birch Interval =

- Directed by: Delbert Mann
- Written by: Joanna Crawford
- Based on: Birch Interval by Joanna Crawford
- Produced by: Robert B. Radnitz
- Starring: Eddie Albert; Rip Torn; Ann Wedgeworth; Anne Revere; Susan McClung
- Cinematography: Urs B. Furrer
- Music by: Leonard Rosenman
- Production company: Radnitz/Mattel Productions
- Distributed by: Gamma III Distribution Co.
- Release date: May 2, 1976 (New York City)
- Running time: 104 minutes
- Country: United States
- Language: English

Birch Interval is a 1976 American independent coming-of-age drama film written by Joanna Crawford, directed by Delbert Mann, and starring Eddie Albert, Rip Torn, Ann Wedgeworth, Anne Revere, and Susan McClung. It is based on Crawford's 1964 novel of the same name.

== Plot ==
In 1947, a fatherless 11-year-old girl, Jesse, is sent away from her big-city home to spend a year with her relatives in the quaint farm village of Birch Interval, which is in the Amish and Pennsylvania Dutch Country of Lancaster County, Pennsylvania. Jesse's grandfather and cousins are not Amish, but their neighbors are.

Jesse has many experiences in the village, some of which are charming and tender, and others which are cruel, absurd, or painful.

== Cast ==
- Eddie Albert as Pa Strawacher
- Rip Torn as Thomas
- Ann Wedgeworth as Marie
- Susan McClung as Jesse
- Brian Part as Samuel
- Anne Revere as Mrs. Tanner

== Release ==
The film was released on May 2, 1976.

== Reception ==
Birch Interval received criticisms upon its release, but it has received praise in subsequent decades.

Richard Eder of The New York Times criticized the film's directing, writing that "There is no possible way to make a good movie about children if you don't know how to direct children."

Bernard Drew of The Journal News wrote, "The big scenes – up until the end – seem to have already occurred or to happen offscreen. What is on is rarely very interesting. Nor are the motivations of a group of characters too complex for the simple framework of the movie always clear. Family movies may be many things but they should never be elliptical."

Jerry Stein of The Cincinnati Post wrote, "Unfortunately, the reserved behavior of the characters brings a basic lifelessness to the film."

In his Movie Guide book, Leonard Maltin awarded the film three stars, calling it a "Beautiful, sensitive film."

In 1986, Danny Peary called the film a sleeper in his book Guide for the Film Fanatic.

In 2006, FilmFanatic.org wrote of the film: "[W]hile it does dip into a made-for-TV sensibility at times, and the overall arc of the narrative flits around rather unevenly to various vignettes ... without giving them their due, Mann’s overall intention – telling a coming-of-age story, with all its inevitable stickiness and melodrama – remains a worthy one." The review also praised the film's "documentary-like glimpse at a Pennsylvania Amish community".

In a 2009 book about the films of Peter Weir, Richard Leonard wrote:

Before Witness [1985] the only other film to focus its narrative on the Amish was Delbert Mann's ... Birch Interval of 1976, where an 11-year-old girl is sent to live with Amish relatives in Lancaster County. Here she learns hard lessons about simple living, loving and letting go. Several themes emerge from ... Witness and its antecedents. The arrival of an urban sophisticate in an Amish community is filled with revelation for the city dweller about the values of sharing and simplicity of lifestyle. As the Amish go about their daily life and explain their beliefs they are, at the same time, admired and parodied for their quaintness. The outsider never stays but returns to the city-life enriched for the contact with Amish. The insider sometimes chooses to depart or is 'shunned'.
