= Spike (dog actor) =

American dog actor (1955–1971)

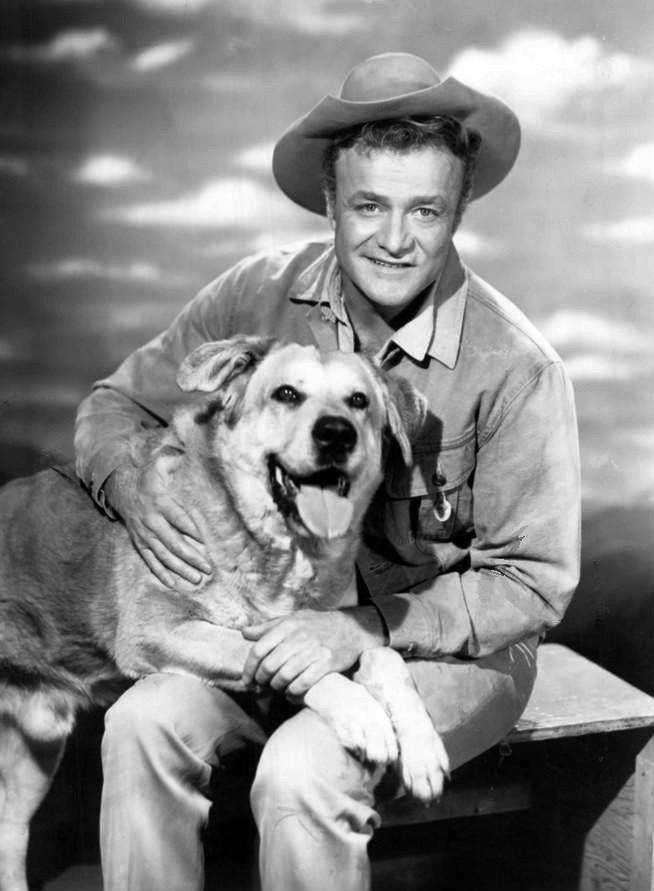
- Spike pictured with Brian Keith in 1960
- Species: Canis familiaris
- Breed: Mastador (Labrador Retriever/Mastiff)
- Sex: Male
- Born: 1955
- Died: 1971 (aged 15–16)
- Nationality: United States
- Occupation: Dog actor
- Notable role: King in The She Creature; Old Yeller in Old Yeller; Patrasche in A Dog of Flanders; Pete in The Silent Call
- Owner: Frank Weatherwax

Spike (1955–1971) was a lop-eared yellow Mastador (Mastiff/Labrador Retriever crossbreed) and a dog actor best known for his performance as the title character in the 1957 film Old Yeller, in which he co-starred with Tommy Kirk, Beverly Washburn, Dorothy McGuire, Fess Parker, and Kevin Corcoran. Spike was rescued as a pup from a shelter in Van Nuys, California, and became the pet and pupil of animal trainer Frank Weatherwax.

Spike also appeared as Patrasche in 20th Century Fox's A Dog of Flanders with Donald Crisp and David Ladd in 1959 and as King in the 1956 film The She-Creature. In 1961, Spike was the star of The Silent Call, playing as Pete with Roger Mobley, David McLean and Gail Russell; the entire film focused on his efforts to reunite with his human family who had been forced to leave him behind while traveling from Nevada to California.

Various television episodes of the period in which Spike appeared included The Mickey Mouse Club and Lassie, and he appeared in every episode of The Westerner with Brian Keith. He also made an appearance in Leave it to Beaver in 1957 "Beaver's Crush" per Trace Stewart.

== Filmography ==
- The She-Creature (1956, uncredited)
- Old Yeller (1957, uncredited)
- Dick Powell's Zane Grey Theatre (1959, uncredited)
- A Dog of Flanders (1960, uncredited)
- The Westerner (1960, uncredited)
- Tales of Wells Fargo (1961, uncredited)
- The Silent Call (1961)
- Disney anthology television series (1967)
- Hondo (1967)
- What Ever Happened to Aunt Alice? (1969)

== See also ==
- List of individual dogs
