= Rechter Thomas =

1953 film by Walter Smith

- Directed by: Walter Smith
- Written by: François Pauwels (book), Walter Smith (scenario)
- Release date: 16 October 1953
- Running time: 105 minutes
- Country: Netherlands
- Language: Dutch

Rechter Thomas is a 1953 Dutch film directed by Walter Smith in black and white. The plot is based on the book Rechter Thomas by Francois Pauwels. The film drew circa 244,000 visitors.

== Cast ==
- Piet Bron ... Rechter Thomas
- Ton van Duinhoven ... Joop
- Johan Valk ... Inbreker
- Rini van Slingelandt ... Lenie
- Max Croiset ... Gevangenisbewaarder
- Henri Eerens ... President der Rechtbank
- Bob De Lange ... Officier van Justitie
