= Bob Weatherwax =

American dog trainer (1941–2024)

- Born: Robert Walter Weatherwax; June 4, 1941; Burbank, California, U.S.
- Died: August 15, 2024 (aged 83); Pennsylvania, U.S.

Robert Walter Weatherwax (June 4, 1941 – August 15, 2024) was an American dog trainer. He was the founder of Weatherwax Trained Dogs which provided dogs to numerous films and television shows including Back to the Future, The Thing, Dennis the Menace, and programs on Nickelodeon. He was the son of Rudd Weatherwax the original owner and trainer of Lassie. Weatherwax died in Pennsylvania on August 15, 2024, at the age of 83.
