= Carmen D'Antonio =

American performer and actress (1911–1986)

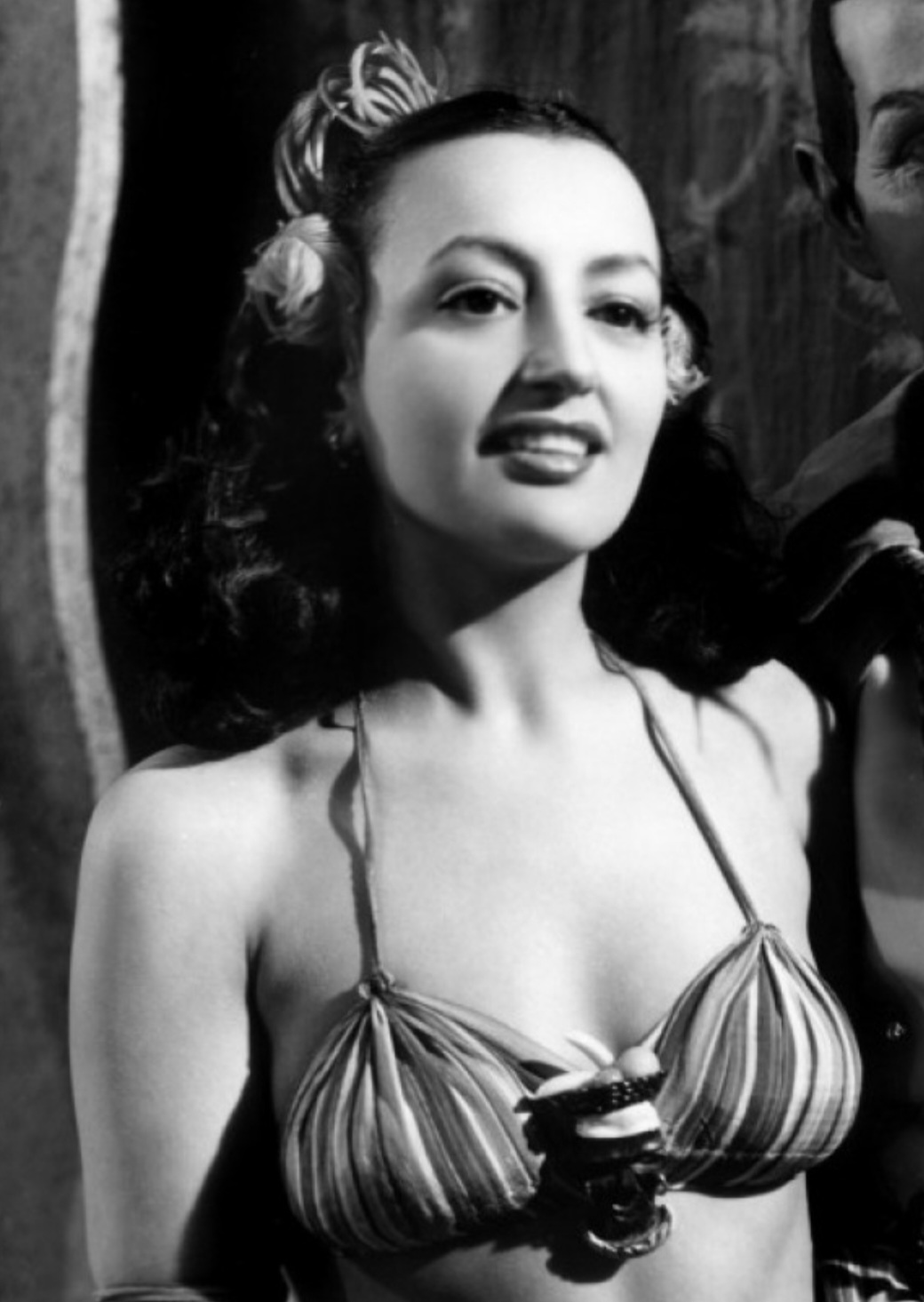
- D'Antonio in Flash Gordon Conquers the Universe (1940)
- Born: Nicoletta Carmen D'Antonio; November 28, 1911; Philadelphia, Pennsylvania, U.S.
- Died: February 9, 1986 (aged 74); Los Angeles, California, U.S.
- Occupations: Actress, dancer
- Years active: 1939–1969
- Spouse(s): Carl Gustav Verner Laand (m. 1944–?)

Nicoletta Carmen D'Antonio (November 28, 1911 – February 9, 1986) was an American actress and dancer.

== Early life and education ==
D'Antonio was born in Philadelphia, the daughter of Carmine D'Antonio and Teresa Colantuono D'Antonio. Her father was born in Italy, and her mother was born in the United States, to Italian immigrant parents. In some publicity, she claimed more far-flung origins, and a much younger age.

== Career ==
D'Antonio was a dancer whose act was usually characterized as "exotic". She had a nightclub act at the Pirate's Den in Hollywood. "She smears herself with oil and does such dances as to give the censors the shudders," according to a 1944 report. Her publicist staged a photograph of her, bathing in "strong black coffee", to add to her mystique.

D'Antonio's film credits included roles in Another Thin Man (1939), Destry Rides Again (1939), Flash Gordon Conquers the Universe (1940), Angels over Broadway (1940), The Long Voyage Home (1940), Arabian Nights (1942), Hard Boiled Mahoney (1947), Sirocco (1951), Golden Girl (1951), World for Ransom (1954), Maracaibo (1958), Tank Commando (1959), and Let No Man Write My Epitaph (1960).

D'Antonio appeared in television programs through the 1960s, often cast as a Native American character in Westerns, as in Have Gun–Will Travel (1962, 1963), Wagon Train (1964) and Cheyenne Autumn (1964), but she also had roles in The Thin Man (1959), Checkmate (1961), My Three Sons (1965), and Family Affair (1969).

D'Antonio also danced on Broadway in Panama Hattie (1940). She made a number of short exotic dance films in the 1940s, with titles including "Jungle Drums Artist" (1941), "Balinesia Artist" (1942) and "Conchita Pepita" (1942). In the 1950s she toured the United States, dancing at nightclubs and casinos. "She offered Hollywood a pretty and generic otherness that could authenticate its fantasies of Singapore, Arabia, or Morocco," commented one film scholar.

== Personal life and death ==
D'Antonio married Karl Gustav Verner Laand in San Francisco, California, on December 16, 1944.

On February 9, 1986, D'Antonio died of undisclosed causes in Los Angeles, California.
