= Brian Part =

American actor

- Born: March 24, 1962 (age 64); Los Angeles
- Occupations: Musician, former actor

Brian Part (born March 24, 1962, in Los Angeles, California) is an American child actor best known for his role of the adopted son of Mr. Edwards (Victor French) on television's Little House on the Prairie. He now writes and performs music with his wife Melody Part.

== Biography ==
Part first developed an interest in acting at the age of five. Right before Part's father died, he made his wife promise that their son could become an actor. Part told his dad that he would make his name famous.

Part's first acting job was in an episode of Lucas Tanner called "Collision" in 1975. Later that year, he was in an episode of ABC Afterschool Special and also made a guest appearance on The Waltons. From 1975 to 1977, Part acted in twenty-one episodes of Little House on the Prairie as Carl Sanderson Edwards, the first of which was "Remember Me - Part 1". In the episode, Julia Sanderson (Patricia Neal), a widow with three children (of whom Part was the middle), learns that she is going to die and needs to find a home for her children. In the continuation of the episode, Part and his television siblings, Radames Pera and Kyle Richards, are adopted by the recently married Mr. and Mrs. Edwards, played by Victor French and Bonnie Bartlett.

In 1976, Part played Samuel in Birch Interval. After Little House he was in Return from Witch Mountain in 1978 and an episode of Project UFO in 1979. During the early 1980s, Part guest starred on such shows as Eight Is Enough and Knots Landing as well as appearing in Max Dugan Returns in 1983.

Part also landed commercials for Dawn dishwashing liquid and Shasta Cola. His stage work includes Desperate Hours alongside Anthony Caruso and a lead part in the musical Forrest Lights with his wife Kathryn E. Part.

Retiring from acting in 1983, Part turned his career towards music, performing with bands such as Warrant and Vixon, as well as musicians Annie Lennox and Dave Stewart. With his wife, Melody Part, Brian has recorded Albums.

Part describes his Little House adventure as "the most wonderful experience anyone could ever have." He also says that he was very close to many of the cast members and that both Michael Landon and Victor French, his television dad, were father figures for him, having lost his own dad as a child. Brian was also close to the rest of his on-screen family, Bonnie Bartlett, Radames Pera, and Kyle Richards.

== Credits ==
- Max Dugan Returns (1983) (Kevin Costello)
- Knots Landing (1981) (guest appearance)
- Eight Is Enough (1981) (guest appearance)
- Project UFO (1979) (guest appearance)
- Return from Witch Mountain (1978) (Goon # 1)
- Little House on the Prairie (1975 to 1977) (Carl Sanderson Edwards)
- Birch Interval (1976) (Samual)
- The Waltons (1975) (guest appearance)
- ABC Afterschool Specials (1975) (guest appearance)
- Lucas Tanner (1975) (guest appearance)
