= Max Croiset =

Dutch actor (1912–1993)

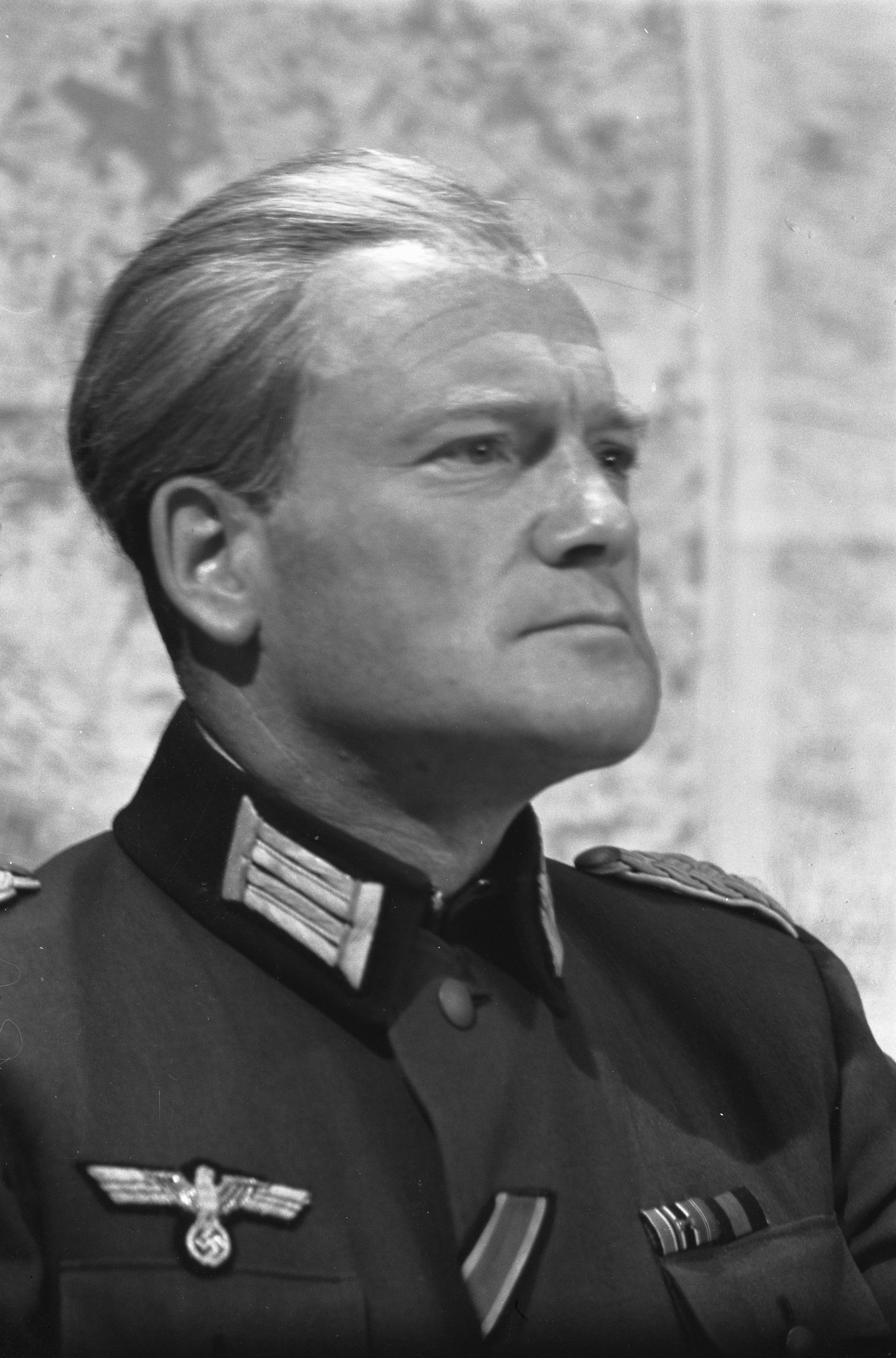
- Max Croiset as Colonel Lanser in the NTS TV play The Flycatcher (De Vliegenvanger), 1961
- Born: 13 August 1912; Blaricum, Netherlands
- Died: 7 April 1993 (aged 80); The Hague, Netherlands
- Occupation: Actor
- Years active: 1934-1993

Max Croiset (13 August 1912 – 7 April 1993) was a Dutch actor. He appeared in 30 films between 1934 and 1993. He starred in the film The Village on the River, which was entered into the 9th Berlin International Film Festival.

== Filmography ==
Year	Title	Role	Notes
1934	Dood Water	Jan Brak	
1936	Oranje Hein	Herman	
1936	Klokslag twaalf		
1938	Veertig jaren		
1940	Ergens in Nederland		Uncredited
1942	De Laatste Dagen van een Eiland		
1948	Niet tevergeefs		
1953	Rechter Thomas	Gevangenisbewaarder	
1958	The Village on the River	Dr. Van Taeke	9th Berlin International Film Festival
1959	Operation Amsterdam		
1960	A Dog of Flanders	Mr. Cogez, the Miller	
1972	The Little Ark	Father Grijpma	
1981	Charlotte	Albert	
1981	Twee vorstinnen en een vorst	Oude / Old Peskens	
1981	Hoge hakken, echte liefde	President-commissaris	
1987	Vroeger is dood	Vader	
1987	Havinck	Vader Lydia	
1991	Eline Vere	Dr. Reyer	
1992	Daens	Father Abbot	
