= A Great American Tragedy =

- Genre: drama
- Written by: Caryl Ledner
- Directed by: J. Lee Thompson
- Country of origin: United States
- Original language: English

Production
- Running time: 75 minutes

Original release
- Release: 18 October 1972

A Great American Tragedy is a 1972 American TV movie directed by J. Lee Thompson. It was first aired as an ABC Movie of the Week on October 18, 1972.

== Plot ==
A middle-aged aerospace engineer is fired. He is unable to find a new job, his wife forced to go back to work and his marriage starts to break up.

== Cast ==
- George Kennedy as Brad Wilkes
- Vera Miles as Gloria Wilkes
- William Windom as Rob Stewart
- Sallie Shockley as Carol
- Hilarie Thompson as Julie WIlkes
- James Woods as Rick
- Natalie Trundy as Paula Braun
- Kevin McCarthy as Mark Reynolds
- Norman Burton
- Stephen Coit
- Regis Cordic
- Peter Dane
- Jo de Winter
- Tony Dow as Johnny
- Nancy Hadley as Trudy Stewart
- Emmaline Henry
- Marcia Mae Jones as Claire
- John Lasell
- Robert Mandan as Leslie Baker
- William Sargent
- Bob Harks as Hotel Guest

== Reception ==
The New York Times said "thought and care have gone into" the film but felt "home-set viewers who have felt the budget pinch aren't likely to bleed for this case of unemployment... Both J. Lee Thompson's direction and Caryl Ledner's writing are best in the rather coolly dispassionate vignettes peeling down the prideful hero, as in one scene at an unemployment office. But Kennedy's moment of truth, a simple decision to buckle down and roll up his sleeves, take a long, exasperating wait that provokes curiosity, hardly sympathy."

The Los Angeles Times said it "ranked among the best work that director J. Lee Thompson, in his TV movie debut, has ever done."
