= David Ladd =

American film/television producer/actor (born 1947)

- Born: David Alan Ladd; February 5, 1947 (age 79); Los Angeles, California, U.S.
- Education: University of Southern California (BS)
- Occupations: Actor; film/television producer
- Years active: 1953–present
- Spouses: Louise Hendricks (m. 1971; div. 1972); Cheryl Ladd (m. 1973; div. 1980); Dey Young (m. 1982; div. 2012); Edita Brychta (m. 2017)
- Children: 2, including Jordan Ladd
- Parents: Alan Ladd (father); Sue Carol (mother)
- Relatives: Alan Ladd Jr. (paternal half-brother)

David Alan Ladd (born February 5, 1947) is an American film and television producer and former actor.

== Early life ==
Ladd was born in Los Angeles, California. His father was actor Alan Ladd. His mother was Sue Carol, Alan Ladd's second wife, who was an actress and talent agent. His father had English ancestry, whereas his mother was of German-Jewish and Austrian-Jewish descent. His siblings are Alana Ladd Jackson and Carol Lee Ladd; his paternal half-brother is Alan Ladd Jr. He attended Harvard-Westlake School in Los Angeles and, following the death of his father in 1964, graduated from the University of Southern California where he earned a Bachelor of Science degree in business administration while also fulfilling his military obligations in the United States Air Force Reserve.

== Career ==
Ladd's professional career in Hollywood began in 1957 with a supporting role in a film starring his father titled The Big Land. As a result of that film's success, Samuel Goldwyn Jr offered him a role as a mute in the 1958 movie The Proud Rebel, once again playing opposite his father and co-starring Olivia de Havilland. For this role, Ladd won a Golden Globe award as the "Best Newcomer of 1958" as well as a special award for "Best Juvenile Actor", and received a Best Supporting Actor nomination. He was also included in Film Daily's Filmdom's Famous Five critic's award.

Ladd followed this success with a series of films including The Sad Horse (1959), A Dog of Flanders (1960), Raymie (also 1960) and Misty (1961), as well as appearing in numerous television shows including Bonanza, Dick Powell's Zane Grey Theatre, Wagon Train, Family Affair and Shirley Temple's Storybook (as Tom Sawyer). Ladd was again included in Film Daily's Filmdom's Famous Five in 1961 for A Dog of Flanders. Ladd's other feature film credits include R.P.M. (1970), Jonathan Livingston Seagull (1973), The Day of the Locust (1975), The Treasure of Jamaica Reef (1975), and The Wild Geese (1978).

Ladd's first solo producing credit came in the motion picture The Serpent and the Rainbow (1988), based on Wade Davis' book of the same name. The film was quite successful, and he was subsequently asked to join his half-brother Alan Ladd Jr in forming Pathe Films in 1988. The duo produced several films before acquiring the venerable Metro-Goldwyn-Mayer (MGM).

Ladd became a senior production executive at MGM and was part of the key team responsible for the resurgence of the studio (1989–1997). He was responsible for a variety of films, including the hit Get Shorty (1995).

Ladd left MGM as an executive in 1998, and signed a deal to produce movies for them. His first production was a re-imagining of the hit TV series The Mod Squad, in which he shared an Executive Producer credit with Aaron Spelling, with whom he had first collaborated on The Zane Grey Theatre in 1961.

During this period, MGM changed hands twice, but Ladd was able to continue his productions. He found a manuscript written by John Katzenbach and developed it as a screenplay for the 2002 film, Hart's War, directed by Gregory Hoblit and starring Bruce Willis, Colin Farrell and Terrence Howard. Ladd followed this up with the 2003 comedy A Guy Thing.

== Later years ==
Shortly thereafter, MGM was sold and Ladd left the company as an independent. He is currently developing projects for Fox, Universal and Paramount, as well as projects for the independent film market-place. In 2008, he helped shepherd Kevin Sheridan's Leaving Barstow, which won several awards on the film festival circuit.

Ladd spent a portion of 2007 teaching film production at the Savannah College of Art and Design. He is a member of the Producers Guild of America, the Academy of Motion Picture Arts and Sciences, and an emeritus member of the Screen Actors Guild.

== Filmography ==
| Year | Title | Role | Notes |
|---|---|---|---|
| 1953 | Shane | Little Boy | Uncredited |
| 1957 | The Big Land | David Johnson / Echo | |
| 1958 | The Proud Rebel | David Chandler | |
| 1959 | A Dog of Flanders | Nello Daas | |
| 1959 | The Sad Horse | Jackie Connors | |
| 1960 | Bonanza | Billy Allen | Season 1, Episode 30: "Feet of Clay" |
| 1960 | Raymie | Raymie Boston | |
| 1960 | Shirley Temple's Storybook | Tom Sawyer | Season 2, Episode 4: "Tom and Huck" |
| 1961 | Zane Grey Theatre | Thalian Kihlgren | Season 5, Episode 18: "The Broken Wing" |
| 1961 | Misty | Paul Beebe | |
| 1962 | Wagon Train | Terry Morrell | Season 5, Episode 30: "The Terry Morrell Story" |
| 1965 | Gunsmoke | Brian Forbes | Season 11, Episode 8: "The Reward" |
| 1966 | Ben Casey | | Season 5, Episode 21: "Weave Nets to Catch the Wind" |
| 1969 | Love, American Style | Dennis | Season 1, Episode 1: "Love and a Couple of Couples/Love and the Hustler/Love and the Pill" (segment "Love and the Pill") |
| 1971 | Family Affair | Russ Brooks | Season 5, Episode 19: "Put Your Dreams Away" |
| 1971 | Catlow | Caxton | |
| 1972 | The Sixth Sense | Paul | Season 2, Episode 2: "Dear Joan: We're Going to Scare You to Death" |
| 1972 | Death Line | Alex Campbell | |
| 1973 | Jonathan Livingston Seagull | Fletcher Lynd Seagull | Voice |
| 1975 | The Treasure of Jamaica Reef | Joshua Owens | |
| 1975 | The Day of the Locust | Apprentice #4 | |
| 1976 | The Quest | | Season 1, Episode 13: "Dynasty of Evil" |
| 1977 | Police Story | McRyan | Season 5, Episode 2: "Stigma" |
| 1977 | Kojak | Everett Coughlin | Season 5, Episode 12: "I Could Kill My Wife's Lawyer" |
| 1978 | Emergency! | Paramedic Pete, Squad *51, LACoFD | Season 7, Episode 3: "Survival on Charter #220" |
| 1978 | The Wild Geese | Sonny | |
| 1979 | Fantasy Island | David Hanks | Season 3, Episode 6: "The Red Baron/Young at Heart" |

== Bibliography ==
- Holmstrom, John. The Moving Picture Boy: An International Encyclopaedia from 1895 to 1995, Norwich, Michael Russell, 1996, pp. 263–264.
- Best, Marc. Those Endearing Young Charms: Child Performers of the Screen, South Brunswick and New York: Barnes & Co., 1971, pp. 139–143.
