= Sierra Baron =

1958 film by James B. Clark

- Directed by: James B. Clark
- Screenplay by: Houston Branch
- Based on: Sierra Baron; 1955 novel by Thomas W. Blackburn
- Produced by: Plato A. Skouras
- Starring: Brian Keith; Rick Jason; Rita Gam
- Cinematography: Alex Phillips
- Edited by: Frank Baldridge
- Music by: Paul Sawtell; Bert Shefter
- Production company: Regal Films Inc
- Distributed by: Twentieth Century Fox Film Corporation
- Release date: July 1, 1958
- Running time: 80 min
- Country: United States
- Language: English

Sierra Baron is a 1958 American Western CinemaScope color film directed by James B. Clark and starring Brian Keith, Rick Jason and Rita Gam, from the novel by Thomas W. Blackburn.

== Plot ==
In 1848, a rancher, Miguel Delmonte tries to protect his Princessa Spanish land grant, from American landgrabbers after his father is killed. Real estate agent Rufus Bynum, hires a Texas gunfighter Jack McCracken to kill the man. The gunfighter ends up falling in love with the rancher's sister Felicia.

== Cast ==
- Brian Keith as Jack McCracken
- Rick Jason as Miguel Delmonte
- Rita Gam as Felicia Delmonte
- Mala Powers as Sue Russell
- Lewis Allan as Hank Moe
- Pedro Galván as Judson Jeffers
- Fernando Wagner as Grandall
- Steve Brodie as Rufus Bynum
- Carlos Múzquiz as Andrews
- Lee Morgan as Frank Goheen
- Enrique Lucero as Anselmo
- Alberto Mariscal as Lopez
- Lynne Ehrlich as Vicky Russell
- Michael Schmidt as Ralph
- Tommy Riste as Ralph's Father

== Production ==
The novel was published in 1955. The New York Times called it a "grade A novel". In May 1956 the novel was optioned by the sons of Spyros Skouras, Plato and Spyros Jnr, who had formed a production company, Artys Co, with their cousin Charles Spyros Jnr, son of Charles Skouras. André de Toth and John Hawkins wrote a script with De Toth intending to direct; the Skouras brothers wanted Gregory Peck and Jack Palance to star.

Eventually rights shifted to Regal Films Inc and the film was made as part of Regal's ten films in three months. De Toth did not direct.

The film was shot back to back with Villa!! in Mexico, in and around Estudios Churubusco in Mexico City.
