= Frank Weatherwax =

American actor (1902–1991)

- Born: Frank Thrall Weatherwax; June 23, 1902; Camp Palomas, New Mexico Territory
- Died: December 17, 1991 (aged 89)

Frank Thrall Weatherwax (June 23, 1902 – December 17, 1991) was an American actor and animal trainer. He is best remembered with his brother Rudd Weatherwax for their famous collie, Pal, the dog who became famous as Lassie in the 1943 Metro-Goldwyn-Mayer film Lassie Come Home. He also trained and owned the dog Spike, who performed as the eponymous dog in the 1957 film Old Yeller. He also trained the dog Lightning, for the 1935 movie A Dog of Flanders.

== Early years ==
Weatherwax was born in Camp Palomas, New Mexico Territory. (Note: Camp Palomas, now Las Palomas, is an unincorporated community located in Sierra County, about 6 miles south of Truth or Consequences. It uses the ZIP code for Williamsburg, New Mexico, 87942.) He was the brother of Rudd Weatherwax, actor and animal trainer, and uncle of actor Ken Weatherwax. His family moved to Hollywood after World War I.

== Career ==
Weatherwax began his career in films as a stunt rider. Later he and his brother began training animals for films and formed a company to provide trained animals.
