= The Sad Horse =

1959 film by James B. Clark

- Theatrical release poster
- Directed by: James B. Clark
- Screenplay by: Charles Hoffman
- Story by: Zoë Akins
- Produced by: Richard E. Lyons
- Starring: David Ladd; Chill Wills; Rex Reason; Patrice Wymore; Gregg Palmer; Eve Brent
- Cinematography: Karl Struss
- Edited by: Richard C. Meyer
- Music by: Paul Sawtell; Bert Shefter
- Production company: Associated Producers Incorporated
- Distributed by: 20th Century Fox
- Release date: March 1959
- Running time: 77 minutes
- Country: United States
- Language: English
- Budget: $250,000

The Sad Horse is a 1959 American drama film directed by James B. Clark, written by Charles Hoffman and starring David Ladd, Chill Wills, Rex Reason, Patrice Wymore, Gregg Palmer and Eve Brent. One of API's first films, it was released in March 1959 by 20th Century Fox.

== Plot ==
Polio-stricken 10-year-old boy Jackie Connors stays at his grandfather Captain Connors' horse farm while his father Bart goes away on a honeymoon with Sheila, his new wife. Jackie and his dog Hansel become acquainted with a woman named Leslie MacDonald and her thoroughbred North Wind, who hasn't seemed the same since the death of a dog that had been the horse's steady companion.

The unhappy Leslie is seeking a divorce from husband Bill and sees the child's Hansel as a replacement for the horse's dog. Jackie resists and she bribes Captain Connors with a $5,000 trust fund for the boy. Jackie and the dog head off to the hills, looking for a rumored buried treasure that could keep his grandfather from needing the woman's money. A mountain lion menaces the boy, who is saved in the nick of time.

Leslie and Bill reconcile. Bart returns and persuades Jackie that giving up the dog would be a grand gesture, and he agrees.

== Cast ==
- David Ladd as Jackie Connors
- Chill Wills as Capt Connors
- Rex Reason as Bill MacDonald
- Patrice Wymore as Leslie MacDonald
- Gregg Palmer as Bart Connors
- Eve Brent as Sheila
- Leslie Bradley as Jonas
- William Yip as Ben
- Dave DePaul as Sam

== Reception ==
The film was made by Robert L. Lippert, whose Regal outfits produced films for Fox for an average of $100,000. However, with competition from television, Lippert persuaded Fox to start financing as much as $300,000 per film, starting with The Sad Horse. He later claimed that the return on the film "was comparable to a $1 million picture".

== See also ==
- List of films about horses
