= Villa!! =

1958 film by James B. Clark

- Theatrical release poster
- Directed by: James B. Clark
- Screenplay by: Louis Vittes
- Produced by: Plato A. Skouras
- Starring: Brian Keith; Cesar Romero; Margia Dean; Rodolfo Hoyos Jr. Carlos Múzquiz; Mario Navarro
- Cinematography: Alex Phillips
- Edited by: Benjamin Laird
- Music by: Paul Sawtell; Bert Shefter
- Production company: Regal Films Inc
- Distributed by: 20th Century Fox
- Release date: October 1958
- Running time: 72 minutes
- Country: United States
- Language: English

Villa!! is a 1958 American Western film directed by James B. Clark, written by Louis Vittes, and starring Brian Keith, Cesar Romero, Margia Dean, Rodolfo Hoyos Jr., Carlos Múzquiz and Mario Navarro. The film was released in October 1958, by 20th Century Fox.

== Cast ==
- Brian Keith as Bill Harmon
- Cesar Romero as Tomás Lopez
- Margia Dean as Julie
- Rodolfo Hoyos Jr. as Pancho Villa
- Carlos Múzquiz as Cabo
- Mario Navarro as Pajarito
- Ben Wright as Francisco Madero
- Elisa Loti as Manuela
- Enrique Lucero as Tenorio
- Rosenda Monteros as Marianna Villa
- Félix González as Don Octavio
- José Espinoza as Posado
- Rafael Alcayde as Don Alfonso
- Alberto Gutiérrez as Major Domo
- José Treviño as Capt. Castillo
- José Chávez as Col. Martinez
- Jorge Russek as Rurale Lieutenant
- Guillermo Álvarez Bianchi as Julie's Car Driver
- Gisela Martínez as Flamenco Dancer
- Lamberto Gayou as Perez
- Lee Morgan as Rancher
- Ricardo Adalid as First Villager
- Paul Arnett as Second Villager
- Raphael J. Sevilla as Carlos
- Carlos Guarneros as Comic Dancer
- Eduardo Pliego as Mayor
- Yolanda del Valle as Pretty Girl
- Alberto Pedret as Mexican Detective with Harmon

== Production ==
The film was originally called The Pancho Villa Story.

The film was shot back to back with Sierra Baron in Mexico, in and around Cherabusco Studios in Mexico City.

Pedro Armendáriz was meant to play Pancho Villa but he was replaced by Rodolfo Hoyos.

Margia Dean recalled the director "was a former film editor. He’d fill the camera with pictorial things, unnatural things. Brian Keith and I had a love scene, but I had my back to him—we couldn’t look into each other's eyes. That director was shooting for the scenery. He made it uncomfortable, and thus made it hard to be convincing. I remember they built this Indian village—and a portable toilet. One fella in the cast was urinating and the thing blew away. Cesar Romero was... the only one good in the picture—I didn’t like myself or Brian Keith, but of course we had the terrible direction."
