= Robert B. Radnitz =

American film producer

Robert Bonoff Radnitz (August 9, 1924 – June 6, 2010) was an American film producer best known for his production of the family films Sounder and Where the Lilies Bloom. He produced several movies, many of which were adapted from children's literature.

== Early life ==
An only child, Radnitz was born on August 9, 1924, in Great Neck, New York. As an asthmatic child, Radnitz would spend his weekends attending double features with his father, collecting themes that he would use throughout his filmmaking career. He earned an undergraduate degree from the University of Virginia in drama and English and spent a year on the university's faculty teaching English after graduating.

His start in the entertainment field was as an apprentice to theater director Harold Clurman. Radnitz went off on his own in the 1950s, producing the Broadway theatre productions of The Frogs of Spring and The Young and the Beautiful. On October 16, 1966, Radnitz married Joanna Crawford, author of the first novel Birch Interval which was then being adapted into the film of the same name.

== Film production ==
Radnitz moved to Hollywood, starting work for 20th Century Fox as a script consultant. In the 1960s, Radnitz produced several films with director James B. Clark. One of his first productions was the 1960 film A Dog of Flanders about a Belgian farm boy who aspires to be an artist. The film helped develop Radnitz's reputation as "a maker of high-quality movies for children and their parents", according to critic Valerie J. Nelson of the Los Angeles Times.

His 1961 film Misty tells the story of a family and their efforts to raise a filly born to a wild horse. Island of the Blue Dolphins in 1964 was based on the true story of a Native American girl left alone for 18 years on an island. Time described the film as "the very model of what children's pictures ought to be" in a film that "provided sentiment without sentimentality and a moral without a lecture".

In the 1970s and 1980s, Radnitz collaborated on several projects with director Martin Ritt. In May 1970, Radnitz and toy-maker Mattel formed a partnership to produce films marketed to children. My Side of the Mountain was a 1969 film about a boy who decides to leave the big city to spend a sabbatical in the woods to see if he can make it on his own. An early retrospective of Radnitz' works at the Museum of Modern Art in 1969 credited his ability to produce family fare that had more "compassion and sophistication than many so-called adult films".

In the 1970s and 1980s, Radnitz collaborated on several projects with director Martin Ritt. His 1972 film Sounder, based on the 1970 Newbery Medal-winning novel of the same name by William H. Armstrong, was his best known work. Radnitz had been advised not to turn Sounder into a movie because of the perception that theatergoers would not want to see the film. It told the story of an African-American boy living with his sharecropper family in Depression-era Louisiana who longs for an education after his father is sent to prison for stealing food. The film was nominated for the Academy Award for Best Picture. Film critic Charles Champlin of the Los Angeles Times called the movie "beautifully acted, honest, angering and inspiring" and named it as one of his ten best films of that year.

The 1974 film Where the Lilies Bloom, about a teenager struggling to keep her orphaned family together, also received generally positive reviews. Reviewer Howard Thompson of The New York Times wrote that "this beautiful little movie is like a cool, clear dip of mountain spring water" and was made "without one false, hayseed note or drop of sugar". Radnitz' 1983 film Cross Creek, adapted from the memoir of the same title by Marjorie Kinnan Rawlings, tells her story of how she started writing while living in central Florida. The picture, which starred Mary Steenburgen, earned four Academy Award nominations.

Radnitz died at age 85 on June 6, 2010, of complications from a stroke at his home in Malibu, California. He was survived by his wife, the former Pearl Turner.

== Filmography ==
He was producer for all films unless otherwise noted.

=== Film ===
Year	Film	Credit	Notes
1959	A Dog of Flanders		
1960	None but the Brave		
1961	Misty		
1964	Island of the Blue Dolphins		
1966	...And Now Miguel		
1969	My Side of the Mountain		
1972	The Little Ark		
1972	Sounder		
1974	Where the Lilies Bloom		
1976	Birch Interval		
1976	Part 2, Sounder	Executive producer	
1977	A Hero Ain't Nothin' but a Sandwich		
1983	Cross Creek		Final film as a producer

As writer

Year	Film	Notes
1958	Wink of an Eye	Uncredited

=== Television ===
Year	Title	Notes
1977	Mary White	Television film
1991	Never Forget	Television film
