= James B. Clark (filmmaker) =

American film director and editor (1908–2000)

- Born: May 14, 1908; Stillwater, Minnesota, U.S.
- Died: July 19, 2000 (aged 92); Woodland Hills, California, U.S.
- Occupations: Film director, film editor, television director
- Spouse: Isabel O'Brien Clark

James B. Clark Jr. (May 14, 1908 – July 19, 2000) was an American film director, film editor, and television director. His career as a film editor began in 1937, and he was nominated for the Academy Award for Best Film Editing in 1941 for How Green Was My Valley. He continued to work as a film editor until 1960, but in 1955 also began a career as a film and television director. He tended to focus on works involving people's relationships with animals. Among the more popular and notable projects he directed were the films A Dog of Flanders (1959), The Sad Horse (1959), Misty (1961), Flipper (1963), Island of the Blue Dolphins (1964), and My Side of the Mountain (1969), and episodes of the television series My Friend Flicka (1955–1956), Batman (1966–1967), and Lassie (1969–1971).

== Life and career ==
Clark was born in Stillwater, Minnesota, on May 14, 1908. His father, James B. Clark Sr., owned a restaurant, and he had a brother, Asa. He was educated in the public schools in Cleveland, Ohio, and graduated from Ohio University in Athens, Ohio.

He began his career in his family's restaurant business. But in 1937 he moved to California and found work as a film editor at 20th Century Fox, and later married Isabel O'Brien. The couple had two sons and a daughter.

=== Editing ===
Clark edited almost 60 films in his career as a film editor, which lasted from 1937 to 1960. His first film was Wings of the Morning, a British film distributed by 20th Century Fox in the United States. He also edited the Will Rogers film So This Is London in 1939. He moved quickly up the ranks at Fox, editing Charlie Chan at the Wax Museum in 1940 and John Ford's How Green Was My Valley in 1941, which won Academy Awards for both best picture and best director, and for which Clark received a nomination for best editing. In 1942, he edited Henry Hathaway's Oscar-nominated Ten Gentlemen from West Point, and the musical film Stormy Weather (which featured an all-African American cast) in 1943.

Throughout the 1940s and the 1950s, he was one of Hollywood's most reliable film editors, working on such high-profile projects as Nunnally Johnson's Oscar-nominated Holy Matrimony (1943), the religious epic The Keys of the Kingdom (1944), John M. Stahl's Oscar-winning Leave Her to Heaven (1945), Howard Hawks' comedy I Was a Male War Bride (1949), the 1951 military biopic The Desert Fox: The Story of Rommel, Sam Fuller's Cold War drama Hell and High Water (1954), and the highly popular Cary Grant-Deborah Kerr romance picture An Affair to Remember (1957). The last film which he edited was 1960's comedy-fantasy film, Life Is a Circus.

=== Directing ===
Clark began directing films and television in 1955 at the age of 47. His first directorial effort was a 1955 episode of the television series My Friend Flicka. In 1957, he helmed his first motion picture, the war film Under Fire, starring Rex Reason. He next directed Sierra Baron and Villa!! in 1958; two films shot back to back in Mexico, also for Regal Films Inc.

He directed an episode of Playhouse 90 (1957's "The Jet-Propelled Couch") and three episodes of Studio One in Hollywood in 1958. Studio One was nominated for an Emmy Award for Best Dramatic Anthology Series that year. Clark worked steadily in television throughout the 1960s. He directed four episodes of the ABC television network's Adventures in Paradise from 1961 to 1962, four episodes of ABC's The Legend of Jesse James from 1965 to 1966, six episodes of the ABC family drama The Monroes from 1966 to 1967, and four episodes of the CBS television series The Wild Wild West from 1967 to 1968. His longest-running tenure as director on network television, however, occurred on the popular Batman series on ABC. He directed 15 episodes of the show from 1966 to 1967. At the very end of his directorial career, Clark directed four episodes of the long-running television series Lassie, two each in 1969 and 1971.

Clark also had a brief career as an "associate director" on television. It began in 1960 on the anthology television series The Twilight Zone (1959 TV series). Five weeks into The Twilight Zone's second season, the show's budget was showing a deficit. The total number of new episodes was projected at 29, more than half of which (16) had already been shot by November 1960. CBS suggested that six episodes be captured on videotape to cut costs. To further reduce expenses, the episodes would be shot at the network's Television City studios, there would be fewer camera movements, and no exterior shots would be permitted. The six episodes were taped from November and to mid-December, although they would be broadcast out of order between December 1960 and March 1961. Clark acted as associate director on all six of these videotaped episodes, assisting the directors with technical issues regarding videotape and helping to keep the production on track. The episodes he worked on were "Long Distance Call", "Static", "Twenty Two", "The Lateness of the Hour", "The Whole Truth", and the Christmas episode "The Night of the Meek". Clark worked with director Jack Smight on four of these episodes.

In 1966, Clark was associate director alongside director Alex Segal on the made-for-television movie Death of a Salesman, based on the play of the same name by Arthur Miller. They shared a Directors Guild of America Award for Outstanding Directing for a Television Film in 1967 for this effort.

In the 1960s, Clark frequently collaborated with producer Robert B. Radnitz. Throughout the late 1950s and the 1960s, Clark continued to direct films, although just 15 pictures bear his name. His most popular and critically praised motion pictures focused on people's relationships with animals and the wild: A Dog of Flanders (1959), The Sad Horse (1959), Misty (1961), Flipper (1963), Island of the Blue Dolphins (1964), and My Side of the Mountain (1969). A Dog of Flanders was widely praised for its performances and lush, painterly cinematography, while Flipper proved highly popular and led to a long-running television series (with which Clark was not associated).

James B. Clark retired from the entertainment industry in 1974. Clark died at his home in Woodland Hills, California, of unspecified causes at the age of 92.

== Selected filmography ==
Editor

- 23 Paces to Baker Street (1956)
- Captain Eddie (1945)
- How Green Was My Valley (1942) (nominee, Best Film Editing Academy Award)
- So This Is London (1939)
- Keep Smiling (1938)

Director

- ABC Afterschool Specials (TV Series; 1 episode) (1974)
- Firehouse (TV Series; 1 episode) (1974)
- The Little Ark (1972) (film was nominated for best song Academy Award, "Come Follow, Follow Me")
- Lassie (TV Series; 4 episodes) (1969–71)
- Lassie: Well of Love (TV Movie) (1970)
- The High Chaparral (TV Series; 2 episodes) (1969–70)
- Bonanza (TV Series; 1 episode) (1969)
- My Side of the Mountain (1969)
- The Wild Wild West (TV Series; 4 episodes) (1967–68)
- Here Come the Brides (TV Series; 1 episode) (1968)
- Daniel Boone (TV Series; 2 episodes) (1965–68)
- Batman (TV Series; 15 episodes) (1966–67)
- The Monroes (TV Series; 6 episodes) (1966–67)
- And Now Miguel (1966)
- The Legend of Jesse James (TV Series; 4 episodes) (1965–66)
- The Loner (TV Series; 1 episode) (1966)
- Death of a Salesman (TV movie) (1966) (winner, Best Director in Television Directors Guild of America; award shared with Alex Segal)
- Voyage to the Bottom of the Sea (TV Series; 1 episode) (1965)
- The Long, Hot Summer (TV Series; 1 episode) (1965)
- Island of the Blue Dolphins (1964) (film won Golden Globe award for best new actress, Celia Kaye)
- Flipper (1963)
- Drums of Africa (1963)
- Adventures in Paradise (TV Series; 4 episodes) (1961–62)
- Bus Stop (TV Series; 1 episode) (1962)
- Misty (1961)
- The Big Show (1961)
- One Foot in Hell (1960)
- Buick-Electra Playhouse (TV Series; 1 episode)(1960)
- The Gambler, the Nun, and the Radio (TV Movie)(1960)
- A Dog of Flanders (1959)
- The Sad Horse (1959)
- Pursuit (TV Series; 1 episode) (1958)
- Villa!! (1958)
- Studio One in Hollywood (TV Series; 3 episodes) (1958)
- Sierra Baron (1958)
- Playhouse 90 (TV Series; 1 episode) (1957)
- Under Fire (1957)
- My Friend Flicka (TV Series; 2 episodes) (1955–56)

== Accolades ==
Award	Category	Subject	Result
Academy Award	Best Film Editing	How Green Was My Valley	Nominated
Boxoffice Magazine Award	Blue Ribbon for Best Picture of the Month for the Whole Family	Island of the Blue Dolphins	Won
DGA Award	Outstanding Directorial Achievement in Television	Death of a Salesman	Won

== Bibliography ==
- International Motion Picture Almanac. New York: Quigley Publications, 1943.
- Roberts, Jerry. Encyclopedia of Television Film Directors. Lanham, Md.: Scarecrow Press, 2009.
- Thomas, Bob. Directions in Action. Indianapolis, Ind.: Bobbs Merrill, 1973.
- Wilson, Staci Layne. Animal Movies Guide. Philadelphia: Running Free Press, 2007.
- Zicree, Marc Scott. 'The Twilight Zone' Companion. New York: Bantam Books, 1989.
