= Anissa Jones =

American child actress (1958–1976)

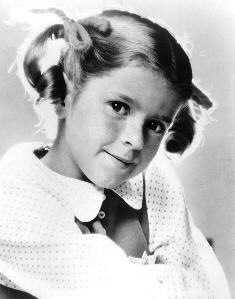
- Jones in 1970
- Born: Mary Anissa Jones; March 11, 1958; Lafayette, Indiana, U.S.
- Died: August 28, 1976 (aged 18); Oceanside, California, U.S.
- Cause of death: Combined drug intoxication
- Occupations: Actress; student
- Years active: 1964–1971

Mary Anissa Jones (/əˈniːsə/; (Note: rhymes with Lisa, not Melissa) March 11, 1958 – August 28, 1976) was an American child actress known for her role as Buffy Davis on the CBS sitcom Family Affair, which ran from 1966 to 1971. She died from a drug overdose, five years after the show ended.

== Early life ==
Mary Anissa Jones was born on March 11, 1958, in West Lafayette, Indiana, and was raised in Charleston, West Virginia, until the age of five. Her maternal grandparents were Lebanese.

At the time of her birth, Jones' father, John Paul Jones, was an engineering graduate and faculty board member at Purdue University, where her mother, Mary Paula Jones (née Tweel), was a zoology student. Soon after the 1960 birth of Anissa's brother John Paul Jones Jr. (called "Paul" by the family), the family moved to Playa Del Rey, California, where John Paul Sr. took a job in aerospace engineering and Jones attended Paseo del Rey Elementary School and then Orville Wright Junior High School. Jones' parents were divorced before her acting career began in 1965.

== Career ==
In 1964, when she was 6, Jones' first TV appearance was in a commercial. Two years later, 8-year-old Jones, who was small for her age, was cast as 6-year-old Buffy Davis on the CBS sitcom Family Affair (1966) (A 2002 revival of the series with a modified backstory revealed the character's full name as "Ava Elizabeth 'Buffy' Patterson-Davis"). In the sitcom, Buffy, her twin brother Jody (Johnny Whitaker), and older sister Cissy (Kathy Garver) are sent to live with their bachelor Uncle Bill (Brian Keith) and his valet, Mr. French (Sebastian Cabot) a year after the children's parents die in a car accident. In 1969, at the height of her celebrity and of Family Affair's television ratings success, Jones made her only film appearance with a small role in The Trouble with Girls, which starred Elvis Presley. She also made one crossover appearance as Buffy on the short-lived series To Rome with Love in 1970. Jones was 12 when Family Affair ended in 1971; she did not work in film or TV thereafter.

== Death ==
Shortly before noon on August 28, 1976, after partying with her boyfriend and others the night before in the beach town of Oceanside, California, Jones was found dead in an upstairs bedroom of a house owned by the father of a 14-year-old friend. Others at the party ranged in age from 12 to 22, as police later determined. The coroner's report listed Jones' death as a drug overdose, later ruled accidental. She was 18 years old.

Jones was given a small, private service. She was cremated, and her ashes were scattered over the Pacific Ocean. She left $63,000 in cash and more than $100,000 in savings bonds when she died (equivalent to roughly $910,000 in 2026 dollars).

=== Investigation ===
Dr. Don Carlos Moshos had prescribed Seconal, a barbiturate, to Jones. An investigation into his professional practices had already begun as a separate, unrelated matter prior to Jones' death. Occupants in the same building as Moshos' office had reported the unusual activity of patients waiting in long lines outside his practice. According to a Torrance Police Department report, Moshos was writing over 100 prescriptions per day. A KABC local news team visited his office and found it filled with young people, some of whom had been waiting over three hours to be seen by Moshos. Wayne Staz, the reporter who initiated the visit, alleged that prescriptions could be obtained with $5.00 and "simply showing identification."

Six days after Jones' death, Moshos was arrested at his office in Torrance and charged with illegally prescribing Seconal to Jones among other drugs-for-profit charges from a concurrent undercover criminal investigation. An envelope with Moshos' business address was present at Jones' scene of death specifying a drug found in her toxicology report (Seconal), its dosage (1½ grains), quantity (50), and the recipient's last name (Jones). Moshos was charged with 11 offenses, but was admitted to a hospital on December 6 with hepatitis (while also suffering from diabetes, high blood pressure, and advancing senility) and died on December 27, 1976, four months after Jones. Although the murder charges were dropped before his death, Moshos' estate was sued by Jones' surviving family for $400,000; in July 1979, the verdict found him 30% liable and Jones 70% responsible for her death and the resulting judgment was reduced to $79,500 ($449,800 adjusted).

=== Aftermath ===
On March 15, 1984, less than eight years after Jones' death, her brother Paul also died from a drug overdose at age 24.

== Filmography ==
| Year | Title | Role | Notes |
|---|---|---|---|
| 1966–1971 | Family Affair | Ava Elizabeth "Buffy" Davis | Main role; 138 episodes |
| 1967 | Dateline: Hollywood | Herself | Guest |
| 1967 | The Hollywood Palace | Herself | Co-host; S5, EP15 (aired December 26, 1967) |
| 1968 | Rowan & Martin's Laugh-In | Herself | S1, EP8; 3 cameos (aired March 11, 1968) |
| 1969 | The Mike Douglas Show | Herself | Guest (aired March 6, 1969) |
| 1969 | The Merv Griffin Show | Herself | Guest (aired March 4, 1969) |
| 1969 | The Trouble with Girls | Carol Bix | An Elvis Presley motion picture |
| 1969 | The Mike Douglas Show | Herself | Co-host; "Kids' Week" (aired December 22, 1969) |
| 1970 | To Rome With Love | Ava Elizabeth "Buffy" Davis | Episode: "Roman Affair" |
| 1970 | The Jerry Lewis MDA Labor Day Telethon | Herself | Guest |
| 1971 | The Dick Cavett Show | Herself | Guest (aired February 25, 1971) |
