= Family Plan =

Family Plan may refer to:

- The Family Plan, an American action-comedy film from Skydance Media.
- Family Plan (2005 film), an American television comedy film
- Family Plan (1997 film), an American comedy film
- "Family Plan" (American Dad!), a 2017 TV episode
- "Family Plan" (Bad Girls), a 2000 TV episode
- "Family Plan" (Family Affair), a 1968 TV episode
- Family planning
