= Kathy Garver =

American actress

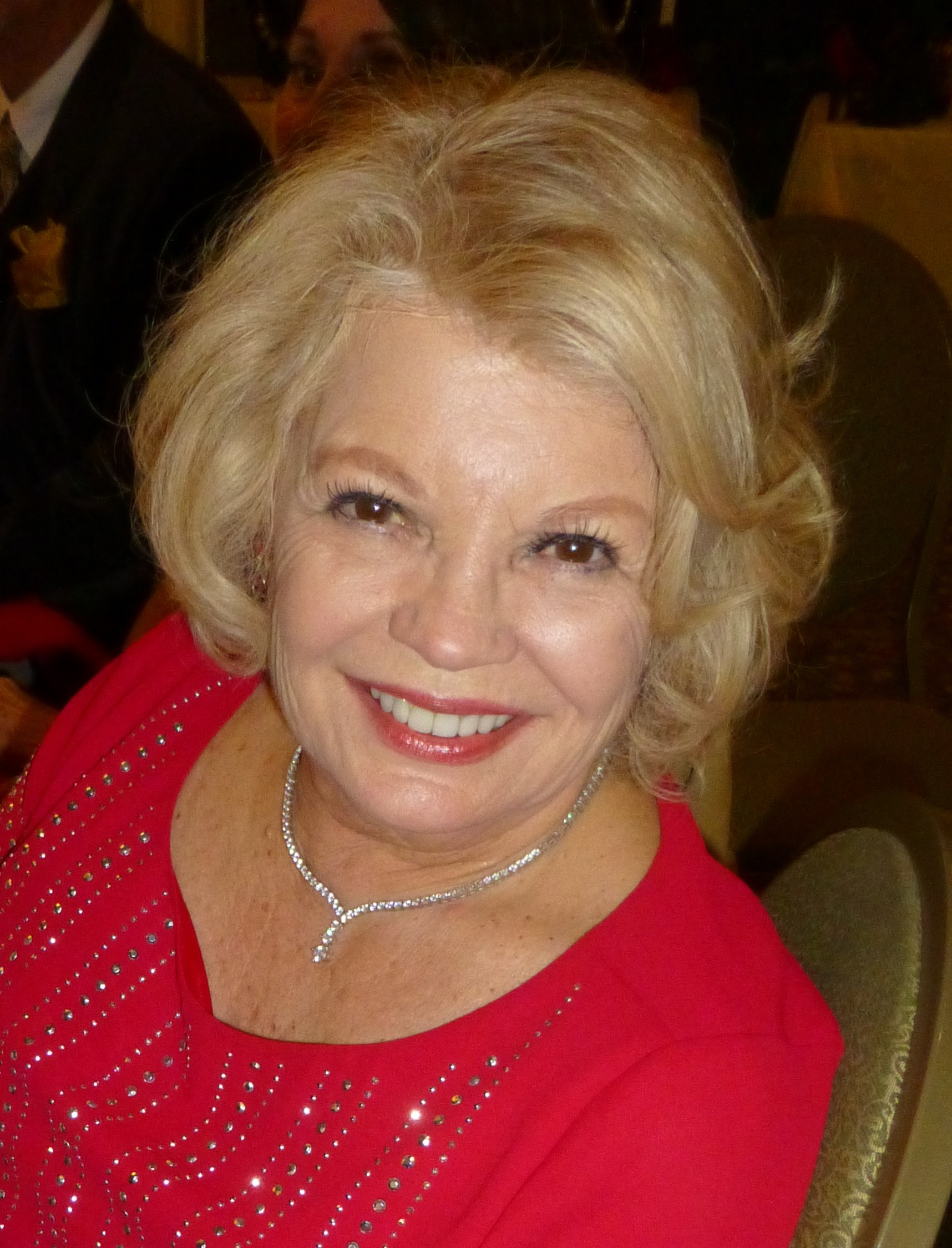
- Kathy Garver at the Golden Halo Awards 2014 in Hollywood, California
- Born: Kathleen Marie Garver; December 13, 1945 (age 80); Long Beach, California, U.S.
- Education: University of California, Los Angeles
- Occupations: Actress; producer; speaker; author
- Years active: 1952–present
- Spouse: David Travis (m. 1981; died 2025)
- Children: 1
- Website: Official website

Kathy Garver (born Kathleen Marie Garver; December 13, 1945) is an American actress best known for portraying Catherine "Cissy" Davis on the popular 1960s CBS sitcom Family Affair. Before that, she was cast by Cecil B. DeMille in the film The Ten Commandments (1956) and later provided the voice of Firestar in the animated television series Spider-Man and His Amazing Friends (1981–83).

Garver authored The Family Affair Cookbook (2009), Surviving Cissy: My Family Affair of Life in Hollywood (2015), X Child Stars: Where are They Now? (2016), The Family Affair Scrapbook, and the newest book Romancing with the Stars: Inspiring Hollywood Love Stories which launched on Valentine’s Day of 2026.

== Early life and child career ==
Garver was born in Long Beach, California, the daughter of Rosemary (Schmoker) and Hayes Garver. She was raised Roman Catholic and attended a Catholic primary school. Garver recalled that her mother began getting her into acting from a young age: "I started singing and dancing at the Meglin Studios in Hollywood, at three years old, as was Shirley Temple, who was also discovered there. I think my mom had the vision of her little daughter as Shirley Temple." When she was nine, she was cast in I'll Cry Tomorrow, but her most famous movie role was one of the young slaves in The Ten Commandments. Garver was cast as an extra in The Ten Commandments, but during filming director Cecil B. DeMille noticed her and wrote her into the movie.

During the 1950s Garver did voice work on radio dramas, including Whispering Streets and Heartbeat Theater. In 1969, Garver released a Christmas song called "Lem, the Orphan Reindeer" on the Aquarian label, distributed by Bell Records. The song was written by Tommy Boyce, Bobby Hart, and E. Justin, and arranged by Jimmie Haskell.

== Career ==
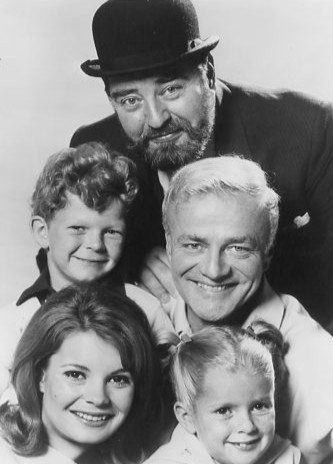
Garver (bottom left) with her co-stars of Family Affair, Brian Keith (center), Sebastian Cabot (back), Johnny Whitaker, and Anissa Jones

In 1966, while studying at UCLA, she auditioned for, and won, the role of "Cissy" Davis, the eldest of the three siblings on Family Affair. Garver had been a fan of series star Brian Keith since she was ten years old and had guest-starred on his earlier CBS series about the Cold War, Crusader. She had also previously worked with co-producer Don Fedderson on The Millionaire. While working on Family Affair Garver began dating her on-screen boyfriend Greg Fedderson, but otherwise did not socialize much with the rest of the cast, since they were all either much older or much younger than she. Family Affair ran for five seasons.

In 1969, Garver appeared as Laura Hayden in The Big Valley season 4 episode "The Royal Road". In 1971, Garver appeared as Paula in the Adam 12 episode of "Pickup".

Garver appeared in such movies as Princess Diaries, Unleashed, and Helen's Last Love, and as guest star in such TV films as Hercules Saves Christmas and FBI Murders. Her stage plays include Voice of the Turtle, Vanities, Under the Yum Yum Tree, Sunday in New York, Star Spangled Girl, Romeo and Juliet with musicals My Fair Lady, River Song: The Adventures of Tom Sawyer and Summer Magic.

Garver provided the voices of Firestar, Storm and other female guest characters on the Saturday morning cartoon Spider-Man and His Amazing Friends. In the 1990s Spider-Man cartoon series, she played the voice of Miss America.

Garver was the voice of Alice Mitchell in the Dennis the Menace cartoon special Mayday for Mother and Pepper in Chuck Norris: Karate Kommandos. Her other voice roles included the television series Fonz and the Happy Days Gang; The Tom & Jerry Kids Show; Droopy, Master Detective; The New Yogi Bear Show; The Richie Rich/Scooby-Doo Show; The All-New Super Friends Hour and the cartoon special Marvin: Baby of the Year. In addition to her television work, Garver has lent her voice talents to numerous commercials, toys, and audiobooks.

Her voice has been heard in the films Apollo 13, Ransom, Backdraft and Jingle All the Way.

Garver appeared in the Christmas episode of the 2002–2003 Family Affair WB series, which was a remake of the original.

Garver has produced, narrated, written lyrics, and composed the music for eight audio Beatrix Potter tales and eight Mother Goose-based audiotapes for Smarty Pants, Inc. She has recorded books for Brilliance Audio, Dove, Audible, and Listen and Live.

From 2008-2012 she co-hosted the Comcast television talk show Backstage! With Barry & Kathy.

Garver's stage performances include productions of Absolutely Dead and Dinner at Five, the latter written and directed by Lloyd J. Schwartz.

As a paid speaker, Garver gives presentations on "The Power of Perseverance" among other topics.

=== Film ===
- The Night of the Hunter (1955) — uncredited/small role (early child work)
- The Ten Commandments (1956) — Rachel (young slave girl; directed by Cecil B. DeMille, her breakthrough)
- The Bad Seed (1956) — Rhoda's classmate (uncredited/small)
- The Princess Diaries (2001) — cable tourist / small role
- Sweet November (2001) — small role
- Race You to the Bottom (2005) — spa attendant
- Invisible Mom II (1999) — Ms. Mason
- Seizing Me (2003)
- Unleashed (2016/2017)
- Helen's Last Love (2017) — Dr. Allen
- Mom, Murder & Me (2014) — Joan
- Santa's Dog (2011) — Sister Augustus
- Hercules Saves Christmas (2011)
- Old Man Jackson (2023) — Gloria Mavis Jackson (also executive producer in some listings)
- Yellow Bird (2022) — Rachel Rush
- Canaan Land (2020)
- Christmas Romance at the Roanoke Ranch (2024/2025) — Anne Devon

=== Television (Selected Series & Guest Spots) ===
- Family Affair (1966–1971) — Catherine "Cissy" Patterson-Davis (main role, 138 episodes)
- The Big Valley (1969) — Laura Hayden (guest)
- Adam-12 (1971) — Paula (episode: "Pickup")
- Spider-Man and His Amazing Friends (1981–1983) — Firestar / Angelica Jones (voice; also some Storm/Ororo Munroe, Leo the Lion; 24 episodes)
- Spider-Man (1994–1998 animated series) — voice work (additional)
- Chuck Norris: Karate Kommandos (1986) — voice
- Various guest roles in 1950s–1960s shows (e.g., Climax!, Matinee Theater, westerns/sitcoms as child actress)

=== Other Notable (Voice, Recent, etc.) ===
- Audiobook narration (Audie Award winner for excellence in audio recording)
- Made-for-TV movies like F.B.I. Murders
- Recent indie films/short roles (e.g., The Empty Church — Ruth; You Can Take It or Leave It — Grandma; Where the Sweetgrass Grows — Kitty Van Ness; The Thing About Pickles — Lucy; The Chifferobe)

== Personal life ==
Garver's husband, David Travis, died of cancer on August 30, 2025. They lived in Hillsborough, California. As of January 2026 Ms Garver is living in Bell Canyon, California with her son, Reid, and daughter-in-law plus dogs Cubby and Jacqueline Chanel.

== Appearances and books ==
On June 26, 2008, she attended the Hollywood Walk of Fame ceremony when Brian Keith was awarded a star posthumously; Garver gave a speech on his behalf.

In 2009, Garver co-authored, with Geoffrey Mark, The Family Affair Cookbook. In September 2015, she published her autobiography, Surviving Cissy: My Family Affair Of Life In Hollywood.

She is also a spokesperson for Clear Captions telephone systems for people with hearing loss.

== Awards and honors ==
In 1995, a Golden Palm Star on the Palm Springs, California Walk of Stars was dedicated to Garver. Garver has won two Audie Awards, one for her narration of The World's Shortest Stories, the other in 2004 for her direction of Amy Tan in The Opposite of Fate read by the author. In 2010, Garver was honored by the Young Artist Foundation with its Former Child Star "Lifetime Achievement" Award for her role in Family Affair.

Miss Garver received the Emerald Award from the Southern California Council and then in 2013 bestowed on Ms Garver the highly esteemed Golden Life time achievement award

On November 7, 2025, Garver was announced as a nominee for a Grammy Award in the Best Audio Book, Narration & Storytelling Recording category for her reading of Elvis, Rocky and Me: The Carol Connors Story. This was her first Grammy nomination. Garver atteded the awards presentation ceremony in February 2026 but did not win, although she did receive a certificate and a Tiffany medallion from The Recording Academy.

Kathy Garver was got a Lifetime Achievement Award on March 15, 2026 at Charmaine Blake's 'Night of Stars' Oscars Gala.
