= Johnny Shiloh (film) =

- Written by: Ronald Alexander; James A. Rhodes; Dean Jauchius
- Directed by: James Nielson
- Starring: Kevin Corcoran; Brian Keith; Darryl Hickman; Skip Homeier
- Theme music composer: Buddy Baker
- Country of origin: United States
- Original language: English

Production
- Producer: Walt Disney
- Cinematography: William E. Snyder
- Editor: Robert Stafford
- Running time: 90 minutes
- Production company: Walt Disney Productions

Original release
- Network: NBC
- Release: January 20, 1963

Johnny Shiloh is a 1963 television film that originally aired as two episodes of Walt Disney's Wonderful World of Color based on the life of John Clem, who was called "Johnny Shiloh". The title song, heard at the beginning of each episode was written by Robert B. Sherman and Richard M. Sherman.

== Plot ==
When the Blue Raiders are called into Union service at the start of the American Civil War, their mascot drummer boy, John Clem, defies his father's wishes and smuggles himself on the train carrying the troops to camp. In spite of efforts by the troops to force him to give up and go home, Johnny refuses and tries to tough it out. He gets photographed by Mathew Brady. His father comes to get him, but Johnny runs away and returns to the regiment. He finally wears down Capt. McPherson, who agrees to let him join the regiment officially. At the Battle of Shiloh, Johnny and General George Henry Thomas rally the retreating Federal forces, but Johnny's friend Jeremiah Sullivan is killed. At the Battle of Chickamauga, Johnny wounds a Confederate colonel who was attacking his friend Gabe Trotter. After the battle, General Ulysses S. Grant promotes Gabe to a lieutenant and Johnny is promoted to sergeant. Johnny and Gabe deliver an important message to General James B. Steedman, but on the way back to Thomas's headquarters, Gabe is wounded and Johnny is captured. Even though questioned by General Joseph Wheeler, Johnny refuses to talk. He makes a daring escape and returns to the Union lines.

== Cast ==
- Kevin Corcoran as John Clem
- Brian Keith as Sgt. (Later lieutenant) Gabe Trotter
- Darryl Hickman as Lt. Jeremiah Sullivan
- Skip Homeier as Capt. McPherson
- Eddie Hodges as Billy Jones
- Ben Morgan as Sam
- Edward Platt as General George Henry Thomas
- Dan Riss as General Wheeler
- Hayden Rorke as General Ulysses S. Grant
- Rickie Sorensen as Rusty
- Buck Taylor as Josh
- Regis Toomey as Mr. Clem
- Billy Williams as Blue Raider #1
- Henry Wills as Stark

== Production ==
=== Music ===
The television film's score was written by Buddy Baker. The theme song was written by the Sherman Brothers, Robert B. Sherman and Richard M. Sherman.
