= James Henry Tevis =

American pioneer (1837–1905)

- Born: July 11, 1837; Wheeling, West Virginia, US
- Died: August 29, 1905 (aged 68); Tucson, Arizona, US
- Occupations: Arizona Pioneer; Founder of Teviston, Arizona; Author; Merchant
- Years active: 1857–1900

James Henry Tevis (July 11, 1837 – August 29, 1905) was an American pioneer who founded Teviston, Arizona, later renamed Bowie, Arizona, in 1910. His claim to fame was his book, Arizona in the '50s, which was the basis for a TV mini series by Walt Disney in 1964.

== Early years ==
Born on July 11, 1837, in Wheeling, West Virginia, he was the son of John D. Tevis and Elizabeth McNamee. He married Emma Boston on 24 December 1866 in St. Louis, Missouri.

Tevis ran away from home in 1849, at the age of twelve, and joined the crew of a steamboat headed to New Orleans, Louisiana. After the Civil War, Tevis migrated to St. Louis, Missouri, where he was engaged as the captain of a riverboat for several years.

Tevis migrated to New Mexico Territory, working with the Butterfield Overland Mail Company in 1857, and there, he helped to construct the stage station at Apache Pass, Arizona. He served in the Arizona Guards and participated in many engagements with the Indians. James Henry Tevis served with Herbert's Battalion, Arizona Cavalry during the American Civil War.

== Teviston, Arizona ==
James Henry Tevis and his family settled in Cochise County, Arizona, in 1880. In 1884 he moved to Bowie Station, where he operated the Southern Pacific Hotel. Within a few years, an area around the Southern Pacific Railroad became the town site of Teviston. Tevis filed a homestead application for 160 acres in Cochise County, claiming he had settled in 1880 – then was awarded a patent in 1890.

== Publications ==
- Arizona in the '50s, by James Henry Tevis, foreword by Russell C. Ewing. University of New Mexico Press, 1954.

== Tenderfoot TV miniseries ==
James Henry Tevis compiled a book, Arizona in the '50s about his pioneer adventures in early Arizona Territory, which was published in 1954, almost fifty years after his death. Ten years later, this book became the basis for The Tenderfoot (miniseries), a television production by Walt Disney's The Wonderful World of Color in 1964. Tevis was portrayed by actor Brandon deWilde, one of the stars of the 1953 movie, Shane.
