= Johnny Whitaker =

American actor (born 1959)

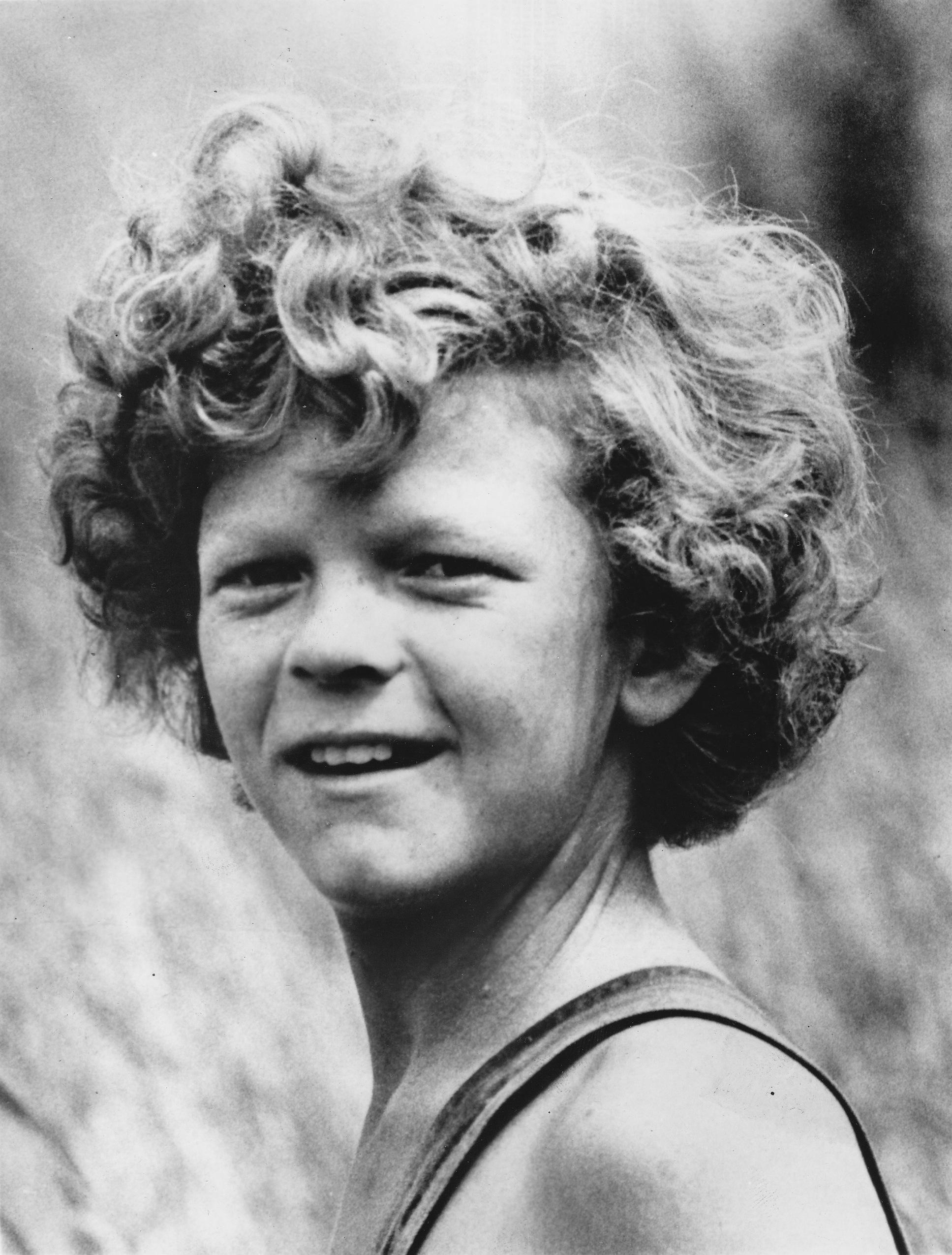
- Whitaker, c. 1972
- Born: John Orson Whitaker, Jr. December 13, 1959 (age 66); Van Nuys, California, U.S.
- Education: Brigham Young University
- Occupation: Actor
- Years active: 1965–77, 1997–present
- Spouse: Symbria Wright (m. 1984; div. 1988)
- Website: johnnywhitaker.com

John Orson Whitaker, Jr. (born December 13, 1959) is an American actor notable for several film and television performances during his childhood. The redheaded Whitaker played Jody Davis on Family Affair from 1966 to 1971. He originated the role of Scotty Baldwin on General Hospital in 1965, played the lead in Hallmark's 1969 The Littlest Angel, and portrayed the title character in the 1973 musical version of Tom Sawyer.

== Early life ==
Whitaker was born in the Los Angeles neighborhood of Van Nuys, the fifth of eight children of Thelma and John O. Whitaker, Sr.

== Acting career ==
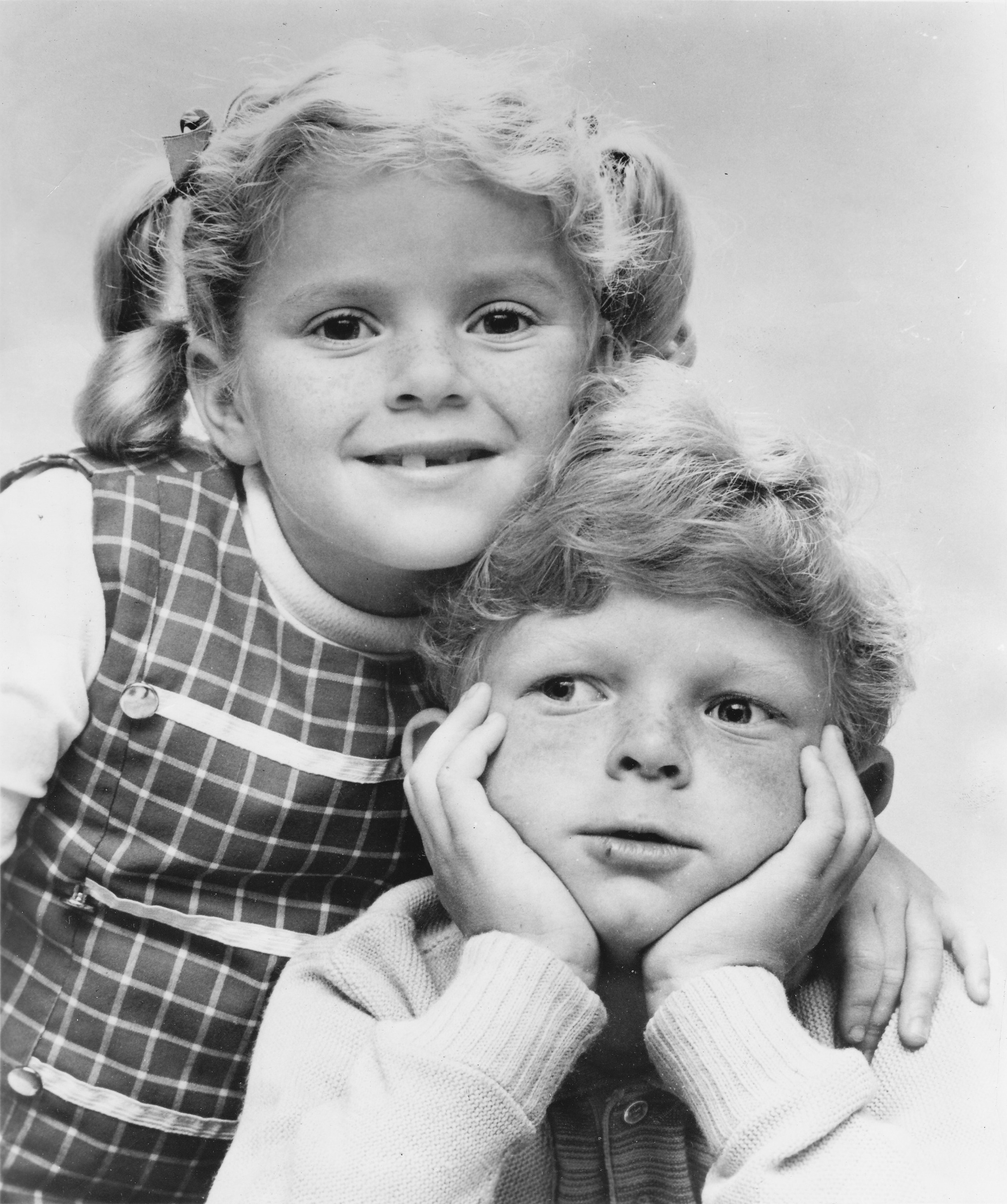
Whitaker and Anissa Jones on Family Affair, 1967

Whitaker began his professional acting career at the age of three by appearing in a television commercial for a local used-car dealer. He went on to appear in advertisements for Mattel Toymakers, for such toys as Larry the Lion and Crackers the Parrot in their Animal Yackers series. In 1965, Whitaker originated the character of the young Scotty Baldwin in the soap opera General Hospital. In 1966, he acted in a major feature film, The Russians Are Coming, the Russians Are Coming, which starred Brian Keith. After Keith was cast as the lead in the television series Family Affair, he recommended Whitaker to play the part of his on-screen nephew.

Family Affair aired from 1966 to 1971. It costarred Whitaker playing the role of an orphaned boy named Jody Davis, living in a high-rise apartment in New York City with his twin sister Buffy (Anissa Jones) and older sister Cissy (Kathy Garver); his bachelor uncle Bill Davis (Brian Keith); and Bill's gentleman's gentleman, Mr. French (Sebastian Cabot). Jody and Buffy were originally supposed to be different ages, but the show's producers thought Whitaker and Jones looked so cute together that they changed them to be twins.

While still appearing regularly on Family Affair, in 1968 Whitaker was a featured guest star (along with Julie Harris) in "A Dream to Dream," a poignant episode of Bonanza, written by series co-star Michael Landon.

During breaks in production of Family Affair, Whitaker starred in the Hallmark Hall of Fame production, The Littlest Angel, alongside Fred Gwynne and Tony Randall, and an episode of the long-running Western, The Virginian; both aired in 1969.

Also, in 1969, Whitaker was a guest star playing Jack in an episode of Bewitched titled "Samantha and the Beanstalk". In 1970, Whitaker played the part of Willie in a Green Acres episode titled "The Confrontation". Later, he played Dinky Watson in a Green Acres episode titled "The Beeping Rock". Later on in 1970, he played the main character of Justin in The Church of Jesus Christ of Latter-day Saints' film A Day For Justin.

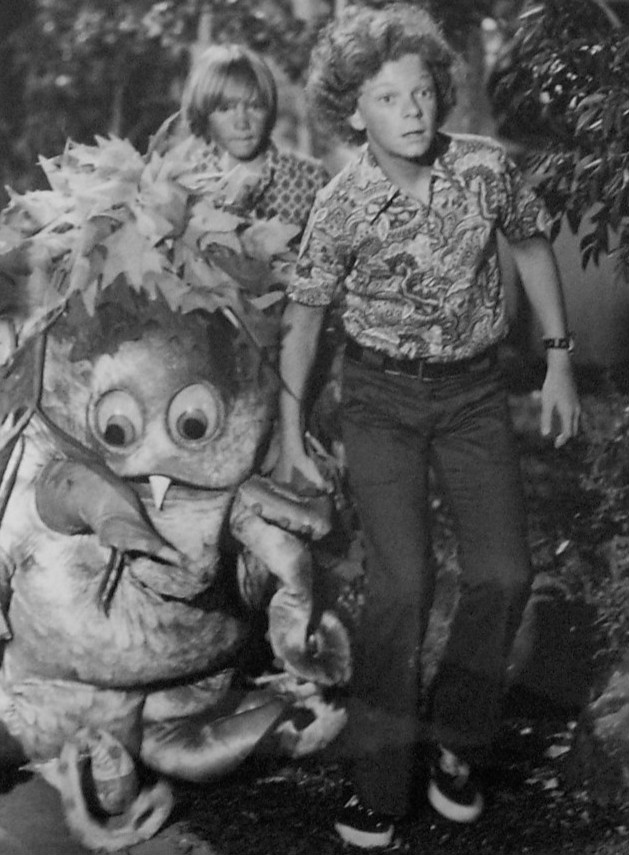
Whitaker and Scott Kolden on Sigmund and the Sea Monsters, 1973

After Family Affair, he appeared in a two-part episode of Gunsmoke in 1971. Whitaker went on to star in the 1973 Sid and Marty Krofft Saturday morning children's series Sigmund and the Sea Monsters alongside Billy Barty and Scott Kolden, and appeared in feature films, including Disney's Snowball Express (1972), The Biscuit Eater (1972), Napoleon and Samantha (1972), The Mystery in Dracula's Castle (1973), and The Magic Pony (1977). His most prominent feature film role during this period was the lead in the musical version of Tom Sawyer (1973).

In an interview with Tom Snyder on The Late Late Show, Whitaker said he had worked as a computer consultant at CBS. He later joined a Los Angeles talent agency, Whitaker Entertainment, owned by his sister. Whitaker also was Dana Plato's manager.

In 1999, Whitaker received the Young Artist Former Child Star Lifetime Achievement Award at the 20th Youth in Film Awards.

In 2012, Whitaker co-produced and co-hosted a short-lived radio talk show, The Dr. Zod and Johnny Show. The following year, he appeared onstage in Judson Theatre Company's production of To Kill a Mockingbird in the cameo role of Judge Taylor.

In 2016, Whitaker gave a guest-star cameo appearance in Amazon's reboot of Sigmund and the Sea Monsters. In the premiere episode, he played the part of heckling boat owner Zach, against David Arquette's salty character Captain Barnabas. The episode had a similar cameo appearance by original show creators Sid and Marty Krofft.

== Filmography ==
Year	Title	Role	Notes
1965	General Hospital	Scotty Baldwin	Originated the role, unknown number of episodes
1966	The Russians Are Coming, the Russians Are Coming	Jerry Maxwell	
1966–1971	Family Affair	Jonathan "Jody" Patterson-Davis	Main role, 138 episodes
1968	Bonanza	Timmy Carter	One episode, "A Dream to Dream"
1968	Green Acres	Dinky Watson	One episode, "Season five, episode 23"
1969	Bewitched	Jack	One episode, "Sam and the Beanstalk"
1969	The Virginian	Hoot Callihan	One episode, "The Runaway"
1969	Lancer	Andy Jack Sickles	One episode, "Child of Rock and Sunlight"
1969	The Littlest Angel	Michael	
1970	A Day for Justin	Justin	The main character in The Church of Jesus Christ LDS short film.
1972	Gunsmoke	Willie Hubbard	Two episodes, also briefly appeared as a different character in a 1967 episode
1972	Napoleon and Samantha	Napoleon	
1972	Snowball Express	Richard Baxter	
1972	Something Evil	Stevie	
1972	The Mystery in Dracula's Castle	Alfie Booth	TV movie
1972	The Biscuit Eater	Lonnie McNeil	
1973	Tom Sawyer	Tom Sawyer	
1973	Adam-12	Eddie Roberts	One episode, "Northwest Division"
1973–1974	Sigmund and the Sea Monsters	Johnny Stuart	Main role; 29 episodes
2002	Family Affair	Kevin	One episode, ""Holiday Fever"
2003	Cram (Celebrity Edition)	Himself	One episode
2013	A Talking Cat!?!	Phil	
2016	A Husband for Christmas	Santa	
2016–2017	Sigmund and the Sea Monsters	Zach	Five episodes

== Personal life ==
Whitaker struggled as an adult with an addiction to drugs and alcohol until his family held an intervention and threatened to cut off contact with him unless he got help. He agreed and joined a twelve-step program; he later became a certified drug counselor and founder of a nonprofit organization for Spanish-speaking addicts. In 2011, he said he had been clean and sober for 13 years.

Whitaker grew up in The Church of Jesus Christ of Latter-day Saints (LDS) (Mormon) and attended the same congregation as Marie Osmond. They became friends, and their friendship continued into adulthood. In 2019, after leaving the LDS church for several years, Whitaker rejoined the church.
