= Family Affair (2002 TV series) =

American television series 2002-2003

- Genre: Comedy
- Developed by: Bob Young
- Starring: Tim Curry; Caitlin Wachs; Sasha Pieterse; Jimmy "Jax" Pinchak; Gary Cole
- Country of origin: United States
- Original language: English
- No. of seasons: 1
- No. of episodes: 15 (2 unaired)

Production
- Executive producers: Bob Young; Gavin Polone; Sid and Marty Krofft; Randy Pope; Tim Curry
- Producer: Dan Kaplow
- Production companies: Pariah Films; Turner Television

Original release
- Network: The WB
- Release: September 12, 2002 – March 13, 2003

Family Affair is a television comedy that aired on The WB from September 12, 2002 to March 13, 2003. It was a remake of the original 1966 television series. This version was from Sid and Marty Krofft, and was produced by Sid & Marty Krofft Pictures, Pariah Films, and Turner Television. The WB canceled the series after airing thirteen of the fifteen episodes produced.

== Cast ==
- Tim Curry as Mr. Giles French
- Caitlin Wachs as Sigourney "Cissy" Davis
- Sasha Pieterse as Elizabeth "Buffy" Davis
- Luke Benward (pilot) and Jimmy "Jax" Pinchak (episodes 2–15) as Jonathan "Jody" Davis
- Gary Cole as William Lloyd "Uncle Bill" Davis

Kathy Garver and Johnny Whitaker from the original series guest starred as Beverly and Kevin in the Christmas episode, "Holiday Fever".

== Production ==
The series was created as a remake of the original 1966–1971 Family Affair television series. It was produced by Pariah Films and Turner Television, with Bob Young, Gavin Polone, Sid and Marty Krofft, and Randy Pope acting as the series' executive producers. It was filmed in the same CBS Studio City lot as the original series.

It was picked up to series by The WB in May 2002, when it was announced that the series would anchor a new Thursday night comedy block for the network. Luke Benward originally played the role of Jody in the series pilot, but was replaced by Jimmy "Jax" Pinchak as Jody in subsequent episodes.

Family Affair earned a full season, when The WB gave the series a back-nine episode order in October 2002, but suffered low viewership soon after. In November 2002, The WB reversed course and cut the episode order for Family Affair by three episodes, and then soon after changed the episode order to just two additional episodes, for a total production order of 15 episodes rather than 22 or 19. The series was then pulled from the air in December 2002 due to low ratings.

The series returned with new episodes in late February 2003, airing after Sabrina the Teenage Witch. By late March 2003, Family Affair was again pulled from the air and was generally considered to be "done". The WB officially passed on a second season of the series in May 2003.

== Episodes ==
No.	Title	Directed by	Original release date	Prod. code	U.S. viewers (millions)
1	"Pilot"	Barnet Kellman	September 12, 2002	101	4.55
Note: One-hour episode.
2	"French Lessons"	Barnet Kellman	September 19, 2002	102	3.38
3	"Mrs. Beasley Disappears"	Barnet Kellman	September 26, 2002	103	2.95
4	"Skivvies"	Allison Liddi-Brown	October 3, 2002	104	2.78
5	"Ballroom Blitz"	Barnet Kellman	October 10, 2002	107	2.35
6	"No Small Parts"	Neal Israel	October 17, 2002	106	2.20
7	"Nightmare on 71st Street"	Barnet Kellman	October 31, 2002	105	1.88
8	"The Room Parent"	Lou Antonio	November 7, 2002	108	2.67
9	"I Know What You Did Last Sunday"	Barnet Kellman	November 14, 2002	109	2.52
10	"Holiday Fever"	Barnet Kellman	December 5, 2002	111	3.08
Note: Guest stars Kathy Garver (Beverly) and Johnny Whitaker (Kevin) appeared as regulars in the original series as "Cissy" and "Jody".
11	"Sissy's Big Fat Moroccan First Date"	Barnet Kellman	February 27, 2003	113	2.68
12	"Miss Turnstiles"	Neal Israel	March 6, 2003	114	3.37
13	"Crushed"	Sheldon Larry	March 13, 2003	115	2.22
14	"Space Invaders"	N/A	Unaired	110	N/A
15	"Uncanny Nanny"	N/A	Unaired	112	N/A

== Reception ==
=== Critical ===
Variety critic Michael Speier reviewed the series premiere of Family Affair negatively, describing it as "a dog of a debut", adding that it "wreaks of manufactured happiness and warm-and-fuzzy plotlines", though Speier praised production designer Scott Heineman for the set design.

=== Ratings ===
The one-hour pilot garnered high ratings for The WB, drawing 4.55 million viewers for its one-hour series premiere. The second episode "held up reasonably well", drawing 3.38 million viewers for its airing. But subsequent episodes declined against competition on Thursdays, and by December 2002 Variety stated that the series "barely register[s] on Nielsen’s charts". For the season, Family Affair ranked 148th out of 159 U.S. broadcast network series (155th in the 18–49 demographic), averaging 2.6 million viewers.
