= Brian Keith =

American actor (1921–1997)

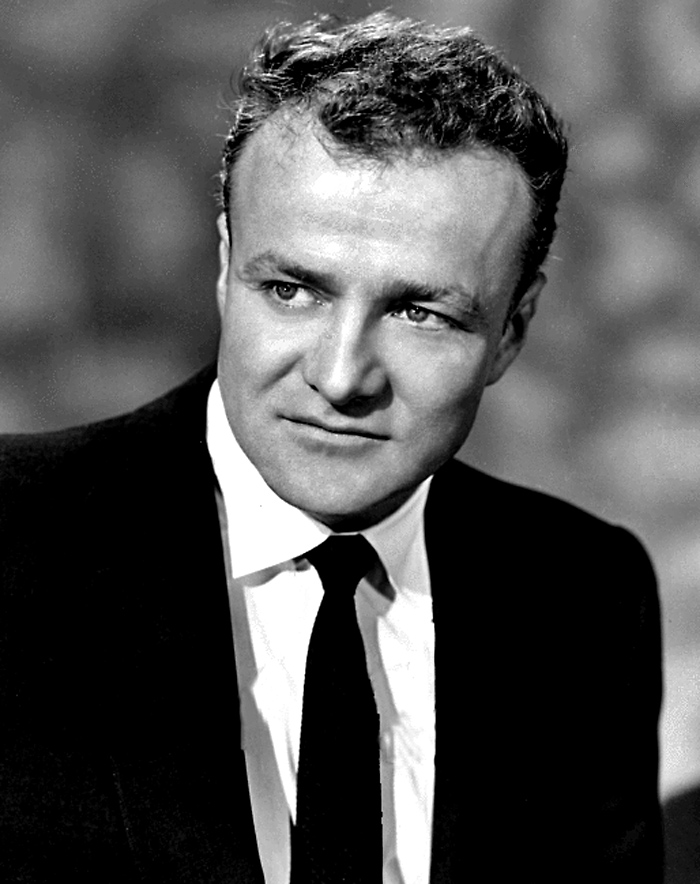
- Keith in Dino, 1957
- Born: Robert Alba Keith; November 14, 1921; Bayonne, New Jersey, U.S.
- Died: June 24, 1997 (aged 75); Malibu, California, U.S.
- Resting place: Westwood Village Memorial Park Cemetery
- Occupation: Actor
- Years active: 1924–1997
- Spouses: Frances Helm (m. 1948; div. 1954) Judy Landon (m. 1954; div. 1969) Victoria Young-Keith (m. 1970)
- Children: 7
- Father: Robert Keith
- Military career
- Allegiance: United States
- Branch: United States Marine Corps; VMSB-243
- Service years: 1942–1945
- Rank: Sergeant E-5
- Conflicts: World War II; Pacific Theater of Operations, United States Marine Corps
- Website: briankeith.com

Robert Alba Keith (November 14, 1921 – June 24, 1997), known professionally as Brian Keith, was an American film, television, and stage actor who in his six-decade career gained recognition for his work in films such as the Disney family film The Parent Trap (1961); Johnny Shiloh (1963); the comedy The Russians Are Coming, the Russians Are Coming (1966); and the adventure saga The Wind and the Lion (1975), in which he portrayed President Theodore Roosevelt.

On television, two of his best-known roles were those of bachelor-uncle-turned-reluctant-parent Bill Davis in the 1960s sitcom Family Affair, and a tough retired judge in the lighthearted 1980s crime drama Hardcastle and McCormick. He also starred in The Brian Keith Show, which aired on NBC from 1972 to 1974, where he portrayed a pediatrician who operated a free clinic on Oahu, and in the CBS comedy series Heartland.

== Early life ==
Robert Alba Keith was born on November 14, 1921, in Bayonne, New Jersey, to actor Robert Keith and stage actress Helena Shipman, a native of Aberdeen, Washington. Some sources also list his full name as Brian Robert Keith. He was Roman Catholic.

He joined the United States Marine Corps in 1942 completing his service in 1945. He served during World War II as a radioman/tail gunner in the rear cockpit of a two-man Douglas SBD Dauntless dive bomber in a U.S. Marine squadron. He was awarded a Combat Aircrew Insignia, Air Medal, Asiatic–Pacific Campaign Medal with three battle stars and World War II Victory Medal.

== Career ==
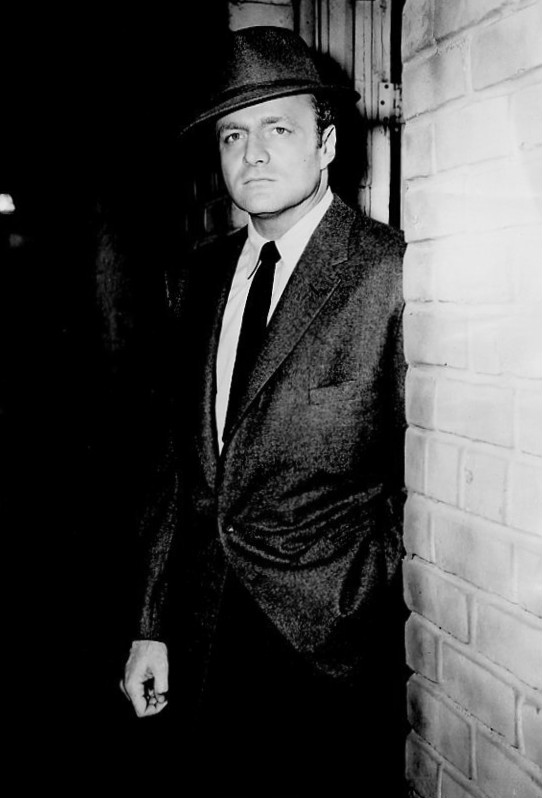
Keith in his TV series Crusader (1955)

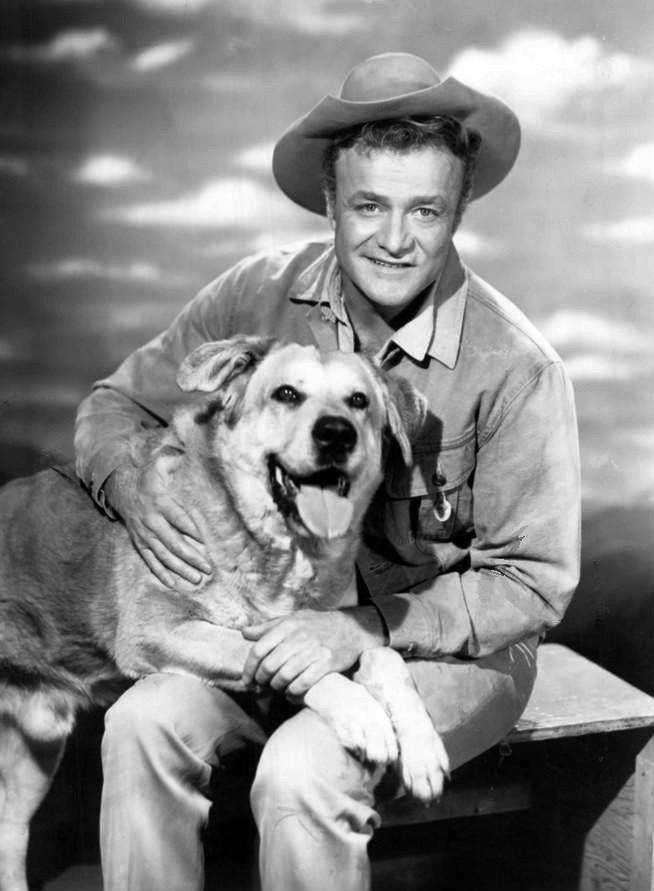
Keith and Spike in The Westerner (1960)

=== Theatre ===
Keith made his Broadway debut in 1948 in the ensemble of Mister Roberts, which starred his father as "Doc". He was a guard in Darkness at Noon (1951) by Sidney Kingsley, and was in Out West of Eighth (1951), which had only a short run.

=== Television and films ===
Keith made his film debut at age 3 in Pied Piper Malone. He began to guest star on shows such as Hands of Mystery, Shadow of the Cloak, and an adaptation of Twenty Thousand Leagues Under the Seas in Tales of Tomorrow. He was in Police Story, Suspense, Eye Witness, The United States Steel Hour, Robert Montgomery Presents, and The Motorola Television Hour. Keith's feature film debut was in a Western for Paramount, Arrowhead (1953). He stayed at that studio for Alaska Seas (1954), replacing Van Heflin, and Jivaro (1954).

Keith guest starred on Campbell Summer Soundstage, The Pepsi-Cola Playhouse, Lux Video Theatre, and The Mask and also played Mike Hammer in a television pilot directed by Blake Edwards, but the series was not picked up.

He went to Columbia for The Bamboo Prison (1954), The Violent Men (1955), Tight Spot (1955), and 5 Against the House (1955), the last two directed by Phil Karlson. He was meant to support Joan Crawford in Queen Bee, but did not appear in the final film.

He guest starred on The Elgin Hour, Mystery Is My Business, Jane Wyman Presents The Fireside Theatre, The Box Brothers, The Ford Television Theatre, Climax!, Wire Service and Studio 57.

In 1955, Keith starred in his own series, Crusader, as fictional journalist Matt Anders. He continued to appear in films for Columbia, such as Storm Center (1956) co-starring with Bette Davis and Nightfall (1956) with Aldo Ray.

In June 1956, he announced he had formed his own company, Michael Productions, and had optioned a story by Robert Blees called Cairo.

=== Film stardom ===
Keith was second billed in Dino (1957) with Sal Mineo, and Run of the Arrow (1957) with Rod Steiger. He was top billed in Chicago Confidential (1957), but returned to supporting parts with Appointment with a Shadow (1957) Hell Canyon Outlaws (1957), and Fort Dobbs (1958). He announced he would make Alien Virus for his Michael Productions, but it was not made. Keith was top billed in some low-budget action movies: Violent Road (1958), Desert Hell (1958), Sierra Baron (1958), and Villa!! (1958). The last two were shot back-to-back in Mexico. He guest starred on Studio One in Hollywood, Rawhide, Laramie, Alfred Hitchcock Presents, and an episode of Zane Grey Theater, which was written and directed by Sam Peckinpah and later led to The Westerner.

=== The Westerner and Disney ===
Keith supported Paul Newman in The Young Philadelphians (1959), and had the lead in two productions for Disney, the TV show Elfego Baca: Move Along, Mustangers (1959) and the feature Ten Who Dared (1960). In 1960, he won acclaim for his starring role in Sam Peckinpah's extremely hard-bitten, adult, and short-lived series The Westerner (1960). The show aired for only 13 episodes. "Only four or five of those were any good", said Keith later. "But those four or five were as good as anything anybody has ever done." Keith guest starred in: The Untouchables, The Americans, Frontier Circus, Alcoa Premiere, Outlaws, Follow the Sun, and Alfred Hitchcock Presents again. Keith made a second film for Disney, playing the father of twins in the film The Parent Trap (1961), costarring Hayley Mills and Maureen O'Hara, which was a huge hit. Critical acclaim was given to The Deadly Companions (1961), a Western with O'Hara, which marked Peckinpah's feature directorial debut. Keith did two more films for Disney, Moon Pilot (1962) and Savage Sam (1963).

He guest starred on Target: The Corruptors, The Alfred Hitchcock Hour, The Virginian, Sam Benedict, Dr. Kildare, The Fugitive, Wagon Train, 77 Sunset Strip, Kraft Suspense Theatre, The Great Adventure, and Profiles in Courage. Keith did a Western for Universal, The Raiders (1963), then returned to Disney for Johnny Shiloh (1963), Bristle Face (1964), The Tenderfoot (1964), A Tiger Walks (1964), and Those Calloways (1965).

He went to Fox for The Pleasure Seekers (1964) and had support roles in The Hallelujah Trail (1965), The Rare Breed (1966) (again with O'Hara), and Nevada Smith (1966), co-starring with Steve McQueen as traveling gunsmith Jonas Cord. Keith did the comedies The Russians Are Coming! The Russians Are Coming! (1966) for Norman Jewison, Way... Way Out (1966) with Jerry Lewis, and With Six You Get Eggroll (1968) with Doris Day.

=== Family Affair ===
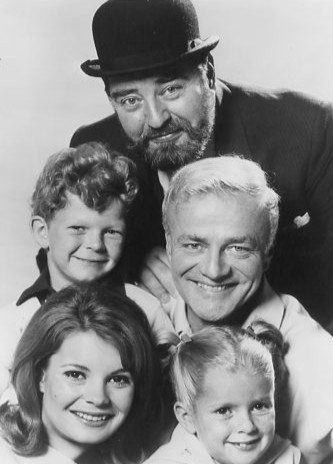
Cast of Family Affair in 1967 (clockwise from top):Sebastian Cabot (Mr. French), Brian Keith, Anissa Jones (Buffy), Kathy Garver (Cissy) and Johnny Whitaker (Jody).

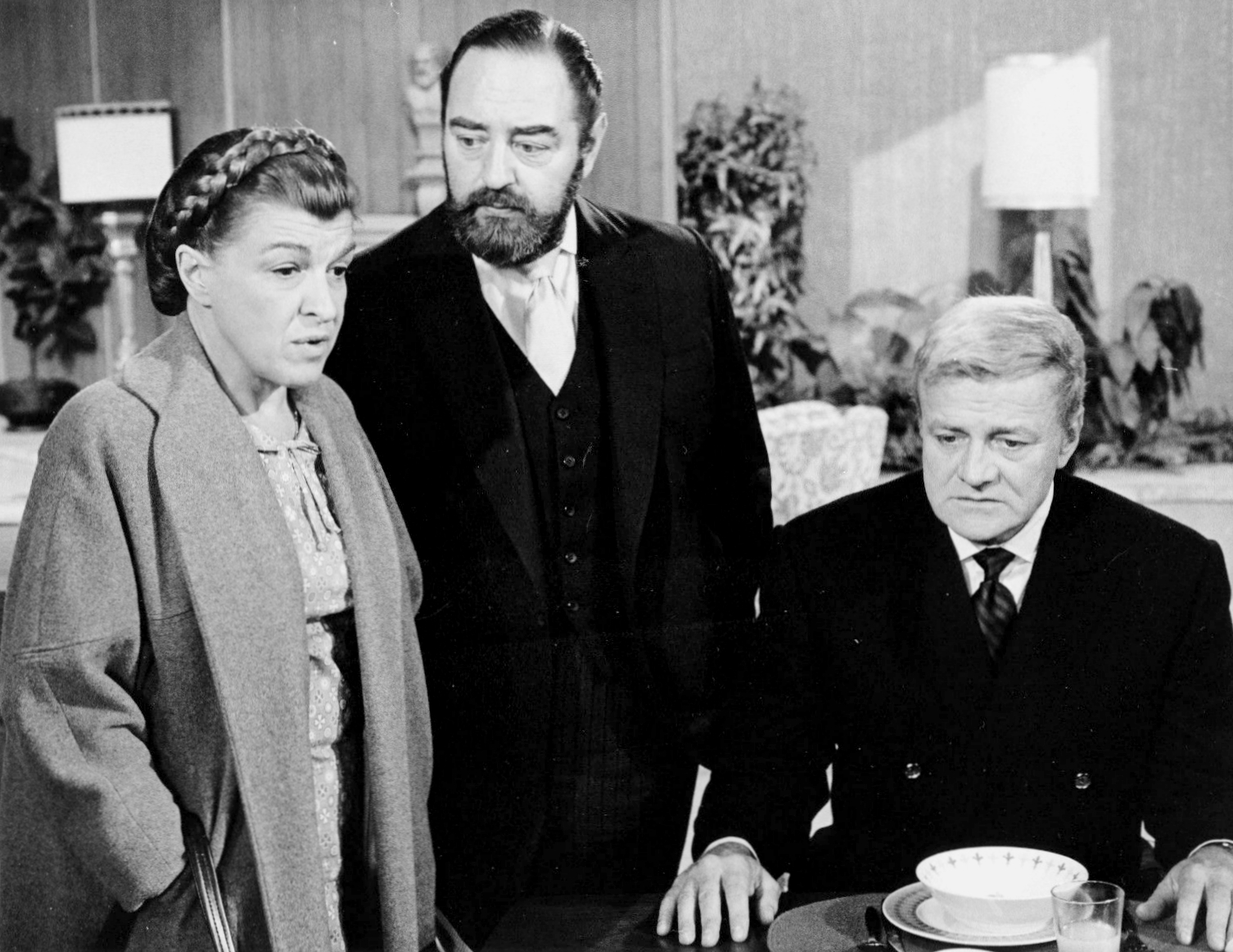
Nancy Walker, Sebastian Cabot, and Brian Keith on Family Affair (1970)

In 1966, Keith landed the role of Uncle Bill Davis on CBS's popular television situation comedy Family Affair. This role earned him three Emmy Award nominations for Best Actor in a Comedy Series. The show made him a household name. It was in the vein of successful 1960s and 1970s sitcoms that dealt with widowhood and/or many single-parent issues, such as The Andy Griffith Show, My Three Sons, The Beverly Hillbillies, Petticoat Junction, One Day at a Time, Here's Lucy, Julia, The Courtship of Eddie's Father, The Brady Bunch, The Partridge Family, and Sanford and Son. During its first season in 1966, Family Affair was an immediate hit, ranking number 15 in the Nielsen ratings. By the end of its fifth season, in 1971, Family Affair still had high ratings, but was cancelled after 138 episodes.

Kathy Garver, who co-starred as Keith's teenaged niece, Cissy, on Family Affair, indicated that Keith said: "I'm a cultural Irishman, don't you know, I'm a cultural Irishman." Garver explained: "But he went through many manifestations and changes of character, during the five years that we shot. At first, he was up and then his second year, he was going through a divorce, and then, the third year, he met somebody else, and he became more anecdotal and told stories that he loved kids, and he was very outspoken about those that he did not like. So, he was a very interesting character and it was Brian and Sebastian Cabot [who played Mr. French] had such a different style of acting and that's another reason I think that Family Affair was so popular and stayed as it did. Both excellent actors, both coming from very different methods and styles of acting with Sebastian was more from the classical style and he would take home his script and he would dutifully look at every single word and have it to perfection, and then Brian would come in and say, 'Oh what do we have today? Let me see the scene, uh-huh, uh-huh, let's go!' So he was very improvisational, motion of the moment. And those two different styles really worked out for each of them very well."

During the series' run Keith appeared in Reflections in a Golden Eye (1967) with Marlon Brando, With Six You Get Eggroll (1968) with Doris Day, Krakatoa: East of Java (1968) for Cinerama, and Gaily, Gaily (1969) for Norman Jewison. He had leading roles in Suppose They Gave a War and Nobody Came? (1970) for Cinerama and The McKenzie Break (1970). In 1970, Keith moved to Hawaii. Keith made Scandalous John (1971) for Disney, Something Big (1972) with Dean Martin and director Andrew McLaglen, and the TV movie Second Chance (1972).

=== The Brian Keith Show, The Zoo Gang, Archer ===
Keith went on to star as pediatrician Dr. Sean Jamison in the NBC sitcom The Brian Keith Show (entitled The Little People during its first season). The series was cancelled in 1974 after two seasons. "The show ended because it was bad, not because of Hawaii," said Keith.

Keith also starred in the role of Steven "The Fox" Halliday in the six-part television miniseries, The Zoo Gang (1974), about a group of former underground French Resistance fighters from World War II. The show also starred Sir John Mills, Lilli Palmer, and Barry Morse, and featured a theme by Paul McCartney. Keith was third billed in The Yakuza (1974) starring Robert Mitchum, and in The Wind and the Lion (1975) starring Sean Connery, Keith played President Theodore Roosevelt for writer-director John Milius. He starred in the TV series Archer (1975) as Lew Archer, replacing Peter Graves who'd starred in the pilot, but it was cancelled after six episodes and has never been rerun in the United States (Jerry Goldsmith's score for the first episode of the series was released in 2018 by Lalaland Records). Keith did some Westerns, The Quest (1976) pilot, and Joe Panther (1976), and the TV movie The Loneliest Runner (1976). He had a supporting role in Nickelodeon (1976) and did the TV movies In the Matter of Karen Ann Quinlan (1977) and The Court-Martial of George Armstrong Custer (1977). He was in How the West Was Won (1978), Hooper (1978) with Burt Reynolds, Centennial (1979), and The Chisholms (1979). In 1992, he starred in the unsold, ABC half-hour pilot The Streets of Beverly Hills.

Keith spoke fluent Russian, which led to his casting as a Russian in two roles: as a Soviet scientist in the film Meteor (1979) with Natalie Wood (who also spoke fluent Russian and played his translator), and as the Soviet premier in the NBC miniseries World War III (1982) with Rock Hudson. He replaced Barnard Hughes on Broadway in Da and was on The Seekers (1979), Power (1980), The Silent Lovers (1980), The Mountain Men (1980) with Charlton Heston, and Charlie Chan and the Curse of the Dragon Queen (1981). Of the latter he joked, "I only did the picture because it had a long title, and I seem to specialize in those." He had support roles in Sharky's Machine (1981) with Burt Reynolds and Cry for the Strangers (1982).

=== Hardcastle and McCormick, Pursuit of Happiness, and Heartland ===
Keith once again returned to series television in 1983, with Hardcastle and McCormick, in the role of a cranky retired judge named Milton C. Hardcastle. Daniel Hugh Kelly co-starred as ex-con Mark McCormick in this ABC crime drama with elements of comedy. The chemistry of Keith and Kelly was a hit, and the series lasted three years until its cancellation in 1986. During the series run, Keith was in Murder, She Wrote and The B.R.A.T. Patrol (1986). Keith starred in The Alamo: Thirteen Days to Glory (1987) (as Davy Crockett), and Death Before Dishonor, then did another TV series Pursuit of Happiness (1987–88), which ran 10 episodes. He was in After the Rain (1988), Young Guns (1988), and Perry Mason: The Case of the Lethal Lesson (1989). He starred in another short-lived series Heartland (1989). He had roles in Welcome Home (1989), and Lady in the Corner (1989).

=== Later career ===
Keith made a guest appearance in the Evening Shade season-one episode "Chip Off The Old Brick" (1991), as the loud-mouthed father of Herman Stiles (played by actor Michael Jeter). He reprised his character from The Westerner in The Gambler Returns: The Luck of the Draw (1991) (which featured numerous actors from 1950s TV series playing their original roles in brief cameos), had the lead in Walter & Emily (1991), a short-lived sitcom, and The Streets of Beverly Hills (1992), a pilot. Brian Keith appeared on a two-part episode of Major Dad, season four "The People's Choice" as the Major's (Gerald McRaney) domineering father who pays a visit to the family. The episode aired on September 25, 1992. Keith performed the role of Mullibok on the Star Trek: Deep Space Nine season-one episode entitled "Progress" (1993), in which an elderly farmer resists forcible relocation by Bajoran authorities.

Among his last performances were The Secrets of Lake Success; Wind Dancer; The Commish; Under a Killing Moon (1994); The Return of Hunter: Everyone Walks in L.A. (1995); The Monroes; Favorite Deadly Sins (1995); Entertaining Angels: The Dorothy Day Story (1996); Walker, Texas Ranger; Touched by an Angel; and The Second Civil War (1997). Keith guest-starred in an episode of the TV series The Marshal titled "The Bounty Hunter" (1995) in which he played then Wichita, Kansas, Police Chief Rick Stone under the stage name of Chief Skoblow. The Wichita Police Department cooperated with the Canadian TV production company by providing details of Chief Stone's actual police dress uniform for Keith to wear during the episode. Keith also provided the voice of Ben Parker on Spider-Man: The Animated Series.

In his last film, Keith played President William McKinley in Rough Riders (1997). Director John Milius dedicated the film to "Brian Keith, Actor, Marine, Raconteur."

His last film appearance was as Roddy Thompson in the Lorenzo Doumani film Follow Your Heart, which was filmed before his death but was not released until 1998.

== Personal life and death ==
Keith married three times. He was married to Frances Helm from 1948 to 1954, Judy Landon from 1954 to 1969, and Victoria Young-Keith from 1970 until his death. He had seven children, one of whom died by suicide six weeks prior to his own death.

On June 24, 1997, at the age of 75, Keith died of a self-inflicted gunshot wound just ten weeks after his daughter Daisy shot herself on April 17, 1997, at his home in Malibu, California. He suffered from emphysema and lung cancer during the latter part of his life, despite having quit smoking ten years earlier. He reportedly also struggled with financial problems and suffered from depression throughout his final days.

Keith's friend Maureen O'Hara did not believe he died as a result of suicide. She stated that he had a large gun collection and he might have been cleaning the gun, or looking at it, when it went off accidentally. She had just visited him and said he was in good spirits and would not have taken his own life given his Catholic beliefs.

Keith's private funeral was attended by Family Affair co-stars Kathy Garver and Johnny Whitaker, and Hardcastle and McCormick co-star Daniel Hugh Kelly. His ashes were interred next to those of his daughter Daisy at Westwood Village Memorial Park Cemetery in Los Angeles.

=== Legacy ===
On June 26, 2008, Brian Keith received a posthumous star on the Hollywood Walk of Fame.

== Filmography ==
=== Film ===
- Pied Piper Malone (1924) as Little Boy
- Arrowhead (1953) as Captain Bill North
- Alaska Seas (1954) as Jim Kimmerly
- Jivaro (1954) as Tony
- The Bamboo Prison (1954) as Corporal Brady
- The Violent Men (1955) as Cole Wilkison
- Tight Spot (1955) as Vince Striker
- 5 Against the House (1955) as Brick
- Storm Center (1956) as Paul Duncan
- Nightfall (1956) as John
- Run of the Arrow (1957) as Captain Clark
- Dino (1957) as Larry Sheridan
- Chicago Confidential (1957) as District Attorney Jim Fremont
- Appointment with a Shadow (1957) as Lieutenant Spencer
- Hell Canyon Outlaws (1957) as Happy Waters
- Fort Dobbs (1958) as Clett
- Violent Road (1958) as Mitch Barton
- Desert Hell (1958) as Captain Robert Edwards
- Sierra Baron (1958) as Jack McCracken
- Villa!! (1958) as Bill Harmon
- The Young Philadelphians (1959) as Mike Flanagan
- Ten Who Dared (1960) as William 'Bill' Dunn
- The Deadly Companions (1961) as Yellowleg
- The Parent Trap (1961) as Mitch Evers
- Moon Pilot (1962) as Major General John M. Vanneman
- Savage Sam (1963) as Uncle Beck Coates
- The Raiders (1963) as John G. McElroy / Narrator
- A Tiger Walks (1964) as Sheriff Pete Williams
- The Pleasure Seekers (1964) as Paul Barton
- Those Calloways (1965) as Cam Calloway
- The Hallelujah Trail (1965) as Frank Wallingham
- The Rare Breed (1966) as Bowen
- Nevada Smith (1966) as Jonas Cord
- The Russians Are Coming, the Russians Are Coming (1966) as Police Chief Link Mattocks
- Way...Way Out (1966) as General 'Howling Bull' Hallenby
- Reflections in a Golden Eye (1967) as Lieutenant Colonel Morris Langdon
- With Six You Get Eggroll (1968) as Jake Iverson
- Krakatoa, East of Java (1969) as Connerly
- Gaily, Gaily (1969) as Francis Sullivan
- Suppose They Gave a War and Nobody Came? (1970) as Officer Michael M. Nace
- The McKenzie Break (1970) as Captain Jack Connor
- Scandalous John (1971) as John McCanless
- Something Big (1971) as Colonel Morgan
- The Yakuza (1975) as George Tanner
- The Wind and the Lion (1975) as President Theodore Roosevelt
- Nickelodeon (1976) as H.H. Cobb
- Hooper (1978) as Jocko
- Meteor (1979) as Dr. Dubov
- The Mountain Men (1980) as Henry Frapp
- Charlie Chan and the Curse of the Dragon Queen (1981) as Police Chief
- Sharky's Machine (1981) as Papa
- Death Before Dishonor (1987) as Colonel Halloran
- After the Rain (1988) as Byron Monroe
- Young Guns (1988) as Buckshot Roberts
- Welcome Home (1989) as Harry Robins
- Entertaining Angels: The Dorothy Day Story (1996) as Cardinal
- The Second Civil War (1997) as Major General Charles Buford
- Walking Thunder (1997) as Narrator (voice)
- Rough Riders (1997) as President William McKinley

=== Television ===
- Suspense (1952) (CBS) (7 episodes)
  - (Season 4 Episode 24: "Night Drive") as Bob
  - (Season 4 Episode 26: "Four Days to Kill") as Johnny
  - (Season 4 Episode 34: "The Corsage") as Lieutenant Jim Connor
  - (Season 4 Episode 36: "The Debt") as Idaho
  - (Season 4 Episode 41: "Fifty Beautiful Girls")
  - (Season 4 Episode 44: "Death Cargo")
  - (Season 4 Episode 51: "Set-Up for Death") as Kip Caley (starring John Marley)
- Police Story (1952) (CBS) (Season 1 Episode 16: "The California Case") (credited as Robert Keith, Jr.)
- Tales of Tomorrow (1952) (3 episodes)
  - (Season 1 Episode 17: "Twenty Thousand Leagues Under the Sea: The Chase: Part 1")
  - (Season 1 Episode 18: "Twenty Thousand Leagues Under the Sea: The Escape: Part 2")
  - (Season 1 Episode 39: "Appointment on Mars") as Jack (credited as Robert Keith, Jr.)
- Crusader (1955–56) (CBS) (52 episodes in title role) as Matt Anders
- Alfred Hitchcock Presents (1959-1962) (4 episodes)
  - (Season 4 Episode 31: "Your Witness") (1959) as Arnold Shawn
  - (Season 5 Episode 5: "No Pain") (1959) as Dave Rainey
  - (Season 5 Episode 34: "Cell 227") (1960) as Herbert 'Herbie' Morrison
  - (Season 7 Episode 20: "The Test") (1962) as Vernon Wedge
- Disney anthology television series (1959-1986) (10 episodes)
  - (Season 6 Episode 7: "Elfego Baca: Move Along, Mustangers") (for Walt Disney Presents) (1959) as Shadrak O'Reilly
  - (Season 6 Episode 8: "Elfego Baca: Mustang Man, Mustang Maid") (for Walt Disney Presents) (1959) as Shadrak O'Reilly
  - (Season 9 Episode 16: "Johnny Shiloh: Part 1") (for Walt Disney's Wonderful World of Color) (1963) as Sergeant Gabe Trotter
  - (Season 9 Episode 17: "Johnny Shiloh: Part 2") for (Walt Disney's Wonderful World of Color) (1963) as Sergeant Gabe Trotter
  - (Season 10 Episode 15: "Bristle Face: Part 1") (for Walt Disney's Wonderful World of Color) (1964) as Lue Swank
  - (Season 10 Episode 16: "Bristle Face: Part 2") (for Walt Disney's Wonderful World of Color) (1964) as Lue Swank
  - (Season 11 Episode 5: "The Tenderfoot: Part 1") (for Walt Disney's Wonderful World of Color) (1964) as Mose Carson
  - (Season 11 Episode 6: "The Tenderfoot: Part 2") (for Walt Disney's Wonderful World of Color) (1964) as Mose Carson
  - (Season 11 Episode 7: "The Tenderfoot: Part 3") (for Walt Disney's Wonderful World of Color) (1964) as Mose Carson
  - (Season 31 Episode 4: "The B.R.A.T. Patrol") (for The Disney Sunday Movie) (1986) (ABC) as General Newmeyer
- The Westerner (1960) (NBC) (13 episodes) as Dave Blassingame
- The Untouchables (1961) (Season 2 Episode 16: "The Jamaica Ginger Story") as Jim Martinson
- Outlaws (1961–62) (NBC) (2 episodes)
  - (Season 2 Episode 3: "My Friend, the Horse Thief") (1961) as Jim Whipple
  - (Season 2 Episode 14: "The Bitter Swede") (1962) as Sven Johannsen
- The Alfred Hitchcock Hour (1962) (CBS) (Season 1 Episode 3: "Night of the Owl") as James 'Jim' Mallory, District Ranger
- Target: The Corruptors! (1962) (ABC) (2 episodes) as George Vaclavic
  - (Season 1 Episode 32: "The Organizers: Part 1")
  - (Season 1 Episode 33: "The Organizers: Part 2")
- Sam Benedict (NBC) (1963) (Season 1 Episode 20: "Run Softly, Oh Softly") as Mitchison Dawit
- The Virginian (1963) (Season 1 Episode 15: "Duel at Shiloh") as Johnny Wade
- Wagon Train (1963) (2 episodes)
  - (Season 6 Episode 28: "The Tom Tuesday Story") as Tom Tuesday
  - (Season 7 Episode 5: "The Robert Harrison Clarke Story") as First Sergeant Gault
- The Fugitive (1963) (Season 1 Episode 1 (Pilot): "Fear in a Desert City") as Edward Welles
- Kraft Suspense Theatre (1964) (NBC) (Season 1 Episode 19: "A Cause of Anger") as Andy Bastian
- Password (1966) (CBS) as Himself, Game Show Contestant / Celebrity Guest Star
- Family Affair (1966–71) (CBS) (138 episodes) as Uncle Bill Davis
- The Bull of the West (1972) (TV movie) as Johnny Wade (archive footage)
- The Brian Keith Show (1972–74) (NBC) (47 episodes; entitled The Little People in 1972–73) as Dr. Sean Jamison
- The Zoo Gang (1974) (ITV) (all 6 episodes) as Steven 'The Fox' Halliday
- Archer (1975) (NBC) (all 6 episodes) as Lew Archer
- The Loneliest Runner (1976) (NBC) (TV movie) as Arnold Curtis
- In the Matter of Karen Ann Quinlan (1977) (TV movie) as Joe Quinlan
- How the West Was Won (originally titled The Macahans) (1978) (ABC) (3 episodes) as General Stonecipher
  - (Season 2 Episode 1: "Buffalo Story")
  - (Season 2 Episode 2: "Mormon Story")
  - (Season 2 Episode 3: "Interlude")
- Centennial (1978–79) (NBC) (12 episodes) as Sheriff Axel Dumire
- The Seekers (1979) (2 episodes: Season 1 Episode 1 and Season 1 Episode 2) as Elijah Weatherby
- The Chisholms (1979) (CBS) (Season 1 Episode 4: "Chapter IV") as Andrew Blake
- World War III (miniseries) (1982) (2 episodes: Season 1 Episode 1: "Part I" and Season 1 Episode 2: "Part II") as Soviet General Secretary Gorny
- Cry for the Strangers (1982) (TV movie) as Chief Whalen
- Hardcastle and McCormick (1983–86) (ABC) (67 episodes) as Judge Milton C. Hardcastle
- Murder, She Wrote (1984) (CBS) (Season 1 Pilot Episode: "The Murder of Sherlock Holmes") as Caleb McCallum
- Pursuit of Happiness (1987-1988) (ABC) (all 10 episodes) as Professor Roland G. Duncan
- Perry Mason: The Case of the Lethal Lesson (1989) (CBS) (TV movie) as Frank Wellman Sr.
- Heartland (1989) (CBS) (TV movie) as B.L. McCutcheon
- The Young Riders (1990) (ABC) (Season 2 Episode 10: "Star Light, Star Bright") as Cyrus Happy
- Evening Shade (1991) (CBS) (Season 1 Episode 15: "Chip Off the Old Brick") as Brick Stiles
- Walter & Emily (1991–92) (NBC) (all 13 episodes) as Walter Collins
- The Streets of Beverly Hills (1992) (ABC) (TV movie) as Charlie Street
- Major Dad (1992) (CBS) (2 episodes) as Jake MacGillis
  - (Season 4 Episode 1: "The People's Choice: Part 1")
  - (Season 4 Episode 2: "The People's Choice: Part 2")
- Star Trek: Deep Space Nine (1993) (syndicated) (Season 1 Episode 15: "Progress" as Mullibok
- The Commish (1994) (ABC) (Season 3 Episode 22: "The Iceman Cometh") as Phil 'Iceman' Greene / Lou Parslow
- The Return of Hunter: Everyone walks in LA (1995) (TV movie) as Pete Morgan
- Spider-Man: The Animated Series (1995-1998) (3 episodes) as Uncle Ben (voice)
  - (Season 1 Episode 5: "The Menace of Mysterio") (1995)
  - (Season 2 Episode 4: "Neogenic Nightmare Chapter 4: The Mutant Agenda") (1995)
  - (Season 5 Episode 13: "Spider Wars, Chapter 2: Farewell Spider-Man") (1998)
- Cybill (1996) (CBS) (Season 2 Episode 16: "Who's Who for What's His Name?") as Arthur Minnow
- Pacific Blue (1996) (USA) (Season 1 Episode 2: "First Shoot") as Mac McNamara
- Touched by an Angel (1996) (CBS) (Season 3 Episode 8: "The Sky is Falling") as Leonard Pound
- Walker, Texas Ranger (1996) (CBS) (Season 5 Episode 3: "Ghost Rider") as Del Forman
- Duckman (1997) (USA) (Season 4 Episode 18: "Kidney, Popsicle, and Nuts") as Duckman's Father (voice)

=== Stage ===
- Heyday (1946)
- Mr. Roberts as First Mate (c. 1950 as Robert Keith, Jr.) N.B. Robert Keith, Sr. was the Doctor in it.
- Darkness at Noon (1951)
- Da (1978)

=== Video games ===
- Under a Killing Moon (1994) as The Colonel
