= The Tenderfoot (The Wonderful World of Disney) =

- The Wonderful World of Disney episodes
- Screen shot of opening sequence of "The Tenderfoot"
- Episode nos.: Season 11; Episodes 4, 5 and 6
- Directed by: Robert L. Friend (Part I); Byron Paul (Parts II-III)
- Written by: Maurice Tombragel
- Cinematography by: John L. Russell
- Editing by: Edward W. Williams
- Production codes: 11.4, 11.5, and 11.6
- Original air date: October 18, 1964
- Running time: 60 min. each

Guest appearances
- Brandon deWilde; Brian Keith; James Whitmore; Richard Long; James Daly; Nehemiah Persoff

Episode chronology
← Previous "A Rag, A Bone, A Box of Junk"	Next → "One Day at Teton Marsh"

"The Tenderfoot" is a three-part live action television miniseries comedy Western film produced in 1964 for Walt Disney's The Wonderful World of Color. It was broadcast over three weeks from October 18 to November 1, 1964. The show is based on James Henry Tevis' book Arizona in the '50s, and was directed by Robert L. Friend and Byron Paul.

Starring Brandon deWilde of Shane (1953) and Disney veteran Brian Keith (The Parent Trap) in the title roles. It aired in 3 parts over 3 consecutive weeks beginning on Sunday, October 18, 1964. It also starred James Whitmore, Richard Long, James Daly, and Nehemiah Persoff in principal roles.

The Tenderfoot was aimed at teen boys and featured major character actors of the period. This was typical of past Disney live action TV productions, most notable being The Scarecrow of Romney Marsh (1964). Also appearing was 15-year-old Disney regular Roger Mobley.

On-location filming occurred on California's Santa Catalina Island and Channel Islands. Highlights include the roundup of wild mustangs and a climactic horse race.

Brandon deWilde had previously appeared in All Fall Down (1962) with Warren Beatty and Hud (1963) with Paul Newman. Brian Keith would be a scene stealer and filmed with deWilde for Disney again the following year in Those Calloways, as his father.

Song "The Tenderfoot" by Disney Legend Richard M. Sherman and Robert B. Sherman.

The Tenderfoot would be released theatrically through Europe in 1966. It aired on the Disney Channel as an edited-down 2-hour feature in the 1990s.

Tevis' Arizona in the 50s, written in 1880 and not published until 1953 and out of print for the last 50 years, was later edited by Betty Barr and Dr. William J. Kelly and re-released.

== Plot ==
Jim Tevis (Brandon deWilde), shortly after arriving in 1856 Arizona from the East, meets up with Mose Carson (Brian Keith), self-proclaimed big brother of legendary frontier scout Kit Carson. According to Mose, Kit learned everything from him and it should really be him that is famous. Mose consoles himself by staying drunk and avoiding Indian fights. Captain Ewell (James Whitmore) is a veteran Indian fighter and Paul Durand (Richard Long) is a misfit soldier and ladies' man. Carson and Ewell take a quick liking to the young Tevis and both agree to make him Mose's junior scout. Together they all wind up in a search for buried treasure with Captain Malcione (Nehemiah Persoff) as the primary villain.

== Cast ==
Actor	Role
Brandon deWilde	Jim Tevis
Brian Keith	Mose Carson
James Whitmore	Captain Ewell
Richard Long	Paul Durand
Donald May	Thatcher
Christopher Dark	Pike
Rafael Campos	Juarez
James Daly	Uncle Max
Roger Mobley	Dave Jones
Nehemiah Persoff	Captain Malcione

== Home media ==
The Tenderfoot has never been released on home media by Walt Disney Studios Home Entertainment.

== See also ==
- List of Disney made for TV Movies
