= Crusader (TV series) =

- Genre: Drama
- Starring: Brian Keith
- Country of origin: United States
- Original language: English
- No. of seasons: 2

Production
- Running time: 30 minutes

Original release
- Network: CBS
- Release: October 7, 1955 – December 28, 1956

The Crusader is an American drama series that aired on CBS from October 7, 1955 to December 28, 1956.

== Plot ==
Freelance writer Matt Anders (portrayed by Brian Keith) worked to help people living in Communist regimes escape to free nations. Anders carried on his crusade because his mother had died in a Communist concentration camp, and he wanted to help other people avoid a similar fate. Episodes' content was based on true stories, using information provided by numerous groups.

== Production ==
Crusader was filmed. It replaced Topper from 8:30 to 9 p.m. Eastern Time on Fridays. The sponsors were R. J. Reynolds Tobacco Company (for Camel cigarettes) and Colgate-Palmolive. Richard Lewis was the producer, and Sidney Salkow was the director.

MCA-TV handled local and regional syndication of the show's 52 episodes.
