= List of Family Affair episodes =

A list of Family Affair (1966–1971) episodes:

== Series overview ==
All five seasons have been released on DVD by MPI Home Video.

Season	Episodes	Originally released		Rank	Rating	Tied with
Season	Episodes	First released	Last released	Rank	Rating	Tied with
1	30	September 12, 1966	May 15, 1967	14	22.6	The Dean Martin Show
2	30	September 11, 1967	April 8, 1968	4	25.5	Gunsmoke; Bonanza
3	28	September 23, 1968	April 14, 1969	5	25.2	—N/a
4	26	September 25, 1969	April 2, 1970	5	24.2	—N/a
5	24	September 17, 1970	March 4, 1971	—N/a	—N/a	—N/a

== Episodes ==
=== Season 1 (1966–67) ===
No. overall	No. in season	Title	Directed by	Written by	Original release date	Prod. code
1	1	"Buffy"	James Sheldon	Edmund L. Hartmann	September 12, 1966	01
After returning from Egypt, Uncle Bill deals with orphaned niece Buffy being abandoned at his residence; later, while Uncle Bill leaves on a trip to Peru, Buffy's siblings Jody and Cissy arrive to complete the family.
2	2	"Jody and Cissy"	William D. Russell	Henry Garson & Edmund L. Hartmann	September 19, 1966	02
Uncle Bill is suddenly forced to adapt to being a father-figure to Buffy, Jody and Cissy; Mr. French isn't as adaptable and departs Bill's service, to return later.
3	3	"The Gift Horse"	William D. Russell	John McGreevey	September 26, 1966	03
Unable to decide on a gift for Uncle Bill, Buffy and Jody decide to surprise him with an older horse, with its carriage, which they bought with their savings.
4	4	"The Matter of School"	William D. Russell	Henry Garson	October 3, 1966	04
Buffy and Jody are enrolled in a local school, but a choice remains for Cissy: attend local high school and remain a family or attend an out-of-town private girls' school and be largely absent.
5	5	"Marmalade"	William D. Russell	Henry Garson & Edmund Beloin	October 10, 1966	05
Mr. French is courted by an advertising agency to promote marmalade and the obligation of his contract threatens his ability to remain in service with Uncle Bill.
6	6	"Room with a Viewpoint"	William D. Russell	Austin Kalish & Irma Kalish	October 17, 1966	06
Buffy feels excluded when Cissy, with whom she shares a bedroom, begins to show signs of growing up and going on her own during bedroom remodeling, to Buffy's worry.
7	7	"Mrs. Beasley, Where Are You?"	William D. Russell	Story by : Phil Davis; Teleplay by : Phil Davis & John McGreevey	October 24, 1966	07
Buffy's Mrs. Beasley doll is accidentally lost while in Mr. French's care and must decide on what doll her next companion will be, while Uncle Bill and Mr. French frantically search for Mrs. Beasley.
8	8	"Who's Afraid of Nural Shpeni?"	William D. Russell	Cynthia Lindsay	November 7, 1966	08
Mr. French finds himself tricked into engagement with a Lebanese woman. Uncle Bill's Lebanese business associate comes to the rescue.
9	9	"A Matter for Experts"	William D. Russell	Story by : Joseph Hoffman; Teleplay by : Joseph Hoffman & John McGreevey	November 14, 1966	09
Buffy and Jody's teacher expresses her concern to Uncle Bill that the twins are too close and try a trial of separating the two in different classes. Buffy and Jody contract "the neasles" to try and escape the separation.
10	10	"Beware the Other Woman"	William D. Russell	Elroy Schwartz	November 21, 1966	10
Cissy's new friend Sharon convinces her that Uncle Bill's new love interest is going to break up the family, sending the children into panic.
11	11	"Take Two Aspirin"	William D. Russell	George Tibbles	November 28, 1966	11
While Uncle Bill is absent on assignment, Mr. French takes ill and is now on the receiving end of Buffy and Jody's dubious assistance.
12	12	"Love Me, Love Me Not"	William D. Russell	Peggy Chantler Dick	December 5, 1966	12
Jody is convinced that Uncle Bill doesn't love him because he doesn't seem very strict about punishment.
13	13	"The Thursday Man"	William D. Russell	Edmund L. Hartmann	December 12, 1966	13
Curious about Mr. French's activity on his day off, Cissy takes a cue from her English teacher and tries to find out what he does, and why much of his life is a mystery.
14	14	"Think Deep"	William D. Russell	George Tibbles	December 26, 1966	14
Cissy becomes obsessed with a philosophy teacher, Julian Hill (Robert Reed), which has Uncle Bill concerned about her level of perception. Trivia: Reed is the first of two 'Bradys' to appear on Family Affair; Eve Plumb also appears in the Season Three episode "Christmas Came a Little Early".
15	15	"Hard Hat Jody"	William D. Russell	Jane Klove & Ted Sherdeman	January 2, 1967	15
Jody befriends a contractor, who Uncle Bill is convinced is an invisible friend, but Uncle Bill later finds out this elusive 'invisible friend' might be of much help to his business.
16	16	"That Was the Dinner That Wasn't"	William D. Russell	Dorothy Cooper	January 9, 1967	16
Cissy wants to attend a mother-daughter dinner and yearns to have Uncle Bill, who has a conflicting business-travel obligation, as her guest.
17	17	"All Around the Town"	William D. Russell	Doug Tibbles	January 16, 1967	17
Buffy and Jody are lost alone in New York City after Cissy and Mr. French each assume the other is taking care of them.
18	18	"One for the Little Boy"	William D. Russell	Austin Kalish & Irma Kalish	January 23, 1967	18
Jody feels outnumbered by his sisters and yearns for man-time with Uncle Bill. Mr. French takes temporary leave and is replaced by brother Nigel (John Williams), also in-service.
19	19	"Fancy Free"	William D. Russell	Doug Tibbles & John McGreevey	January 30, 1967	19
Buffy and Jody move up in class and have difficulty with schoolwork. Uncle Bill comes to realize he's spending less time with the kids and more on relationships with women.
20	20	"A Helping Hand"	William D. Russell	John McGreevey	February 6, 1967	20
Buffy and Jody receive too much help on a homework assignment from Uncle Bill, and Nigel begins to slip in his own duties to assist an inept servant in hers.
21	21	"Once in Love with Buffy"	William D. Russell	Austin Kalish & Irma Kalish	February 13, 1967	21
Uncle Bill, being 'stuck with the kids' during babysitting, realizes how empty his life would be and how unhappy the kids would be if they returned to Aunt Fran, who now decides she wants Buffy back.
22	22	"Ballerina Buffy"	William D. Russell	Henry Garson & Edmund Beloin	February 20, 1967	22
Buffy receives the lead role in a school ballet recital and begins to worry she might become famous and go on tour, so, to ensure staying with her family, she intentionally sabotages her performance.
23	23	"The Mother Tongue"	William D. Russell	George Tibbles	February 27, 1967	23
Buffy and Jody make friends with a Chinese girl who speaks no English; in trying to communicate with the girl’s parents, Nigel nearly loses face due to his struggle with the Cantonese language.
24	24	"Everybody Needs Somebody"	William D. Russell	Ed James & Seaman Jacobs	March 13, 1967	24
After overhearing Mr. French congratulate a service colleague on his nuptials, Buffy and Jody plot to find Niles a wife.
25	25	"The Way It Was"	William D. Russell	George Tibbles	March 20, 1967	25
The kids are sent to a children's camp during a school break, and both Uncle Bill and Nigel realize they miss the hectic family environment.
26	26	"All Nephews Are Created Equal"	William D. Russell	Edmund Beloin & Henry Garson	March 27, 1967	26
Nigel's nephew comes to visit and is worried about his more casual demeanor, yet becomes more worried when the nephew announces a new chosen vocation that isn't service. In the closing scene, a letter from Mr. Giles French arrives announcing that he will be returning to relieve Nigel, who may return to his previous employer. [Final appearance of John Williams.]
27	27	"The Prize"	William D. Russell	Edmund Beloin & Henry Garson	April 10, 1967	27
Buffy and Jody enter a cereal-box contest and try to win a houseboat, but win something else entirely different instead and must decide between their wants and their prize's needs. [Sebastian Cabot returns as Mr. Giles French.]
28	28	"What Did You Do in the West, Uncle?"	William D. Russell	Joseph Hoffman	April 17, 1967	28
Uncle Bill's time with the twins is reduced by a well-meaning cowboy acquaintance spending more time with them, and becomes upset when the friend starts overselling Uncle Bill's bravery to the twins.
29	29	"The Award"	William D. Russell	Edmund Beloin & Henry Garson	May 1, 1967	29
The issue of lying is explored when Buffy and Jody try to hide a special prize for Uncle Bill, using clay they are both unknowingly allergic to.
30	30	"The Butler Method"	William D. Russell	George Tibbles	May 15, 1967	30
Mr. French is studied by an actor friend of Uncle Bill's in preparation for a movie role. Cissy experiences trouble and heartbreak trying to find a date for the Tag Dance.

=== Season 2 (1967–68) ===
No. overall	No. in season	Title	Directed by	Written by	Original release date	Prod. code
31	1	"Birds, Bees and Buffy"	Charles Barton	Phil Davis	September 11, 1967	31
When Buffy and Jody become curious as to where babies come from, Uncle Bill is compelled to find an answer among differing opinions from family and friends.
32	2	"First Love"	Charles Barton	Austin Kalish & Irma Kalish	September 18, 1967	32
Jody has a new friend, upon whom Buffy develops a crush, but the friend develops a crush on Cissy instead.
33	3	"Go Home, Mr. French"	Charles Barton	Seaman Jacobs & Fred S. Fox	September 25, 1967	33
Mr. French reunites with an old female friend, also in-service, and is tempted to return to England with her.
34	4	"Arthur, the Invisible Bear"	Charles Barton	John McGreevey	October 2, 1967	34
Jody develops a relationship with an invisible friend, who not only seems to get Jody into trouble but arouses Uncle Bill's concern and a trip for Jody to a psychologist.
35	5	"The Other Cheek"	Charles Barton	Elroy Schwartz	October 9, 1967	35
A girl bullies Jody at school, and it seems that none of Uncle Bill's advice is working out, and Uncle Bill intervenes with the bully's parent.
36	6	"The Candy Striper"	William D. Russell	Story by : Jerry Devine; Teleplay by : Jerry Devine & John McGreevey	October 16, 1967	36
Cissy's new stint as a candy-striper at a local hospital has her feeling torn between duty and humanity when she accidentally breaks a rule.
37	7	"Fat, Fat, the Water Rat"	Charles Barton	Phil Davis	October 23, 1967	37
Buffy befriends some local disadvantaged children, who are generally unfriendly to others more privileged than they are.
38	8	"The Toy Box"	Charles Barton	Arthur Marx	November 6, 1967	38
Uncle Bill confronts Buffy and Jody regarding an excess of toys they own, which seem to be everywhere except in their toy box.
39	9	"Take Me Out of the Ballgame"	Charles Barton	Henry Garson & Edmund Beloin	November 13, 1967	39
Buffy and Jody both try out for the local stickball team, but it's Buffy who outshines Jody.
40	10	"You Like Buffy Better"	Charles Barton	Harry Winkler & Hannibal Coons	November 20, 1967	40
Sibling rivalry erupts when it's believed Uncle Bill is spending more time with Jody than Buffy or Cissy.
41	11	"Freddie"	William D. Russell	John McGreevey	November 27, 1967	41
Uncle Bill entertains an old female friend from Terre Haute, and must reconcile this with the kids' open house at school.
42	12	"Our Friend Stanley"	Charles Barton	Henry Garson & Edmund Beloin	December 4, 1967	42
A boy with a disability moves into the building, and Buffy and Jody try to help him fit in at school.
43	13	"Somebody Upstairs"	Charles Barton	Austin Kalish & Irma Kalish	December 11, 1967	43
A new resident in the building has Buffy and Jody starstruck when they find she is a celebrity.
44	14	"Star Dust"	Charles Barton	Roy Kammerman	December 18, 1967	44
Bill attends a friend's party, meets an actress, and is soon charmed by her enough to consider proposing marriage.
45	15	"Best of Breed"	Charles Barton	Ed James	December 25, 1967	45
Buffy and Jody bring a stray dog home and encounter a major challenge in trying to keep Uncle Bill and Mr. French from knowing it's there.
46	16	"Family Reunion"	Charles Barton	Ed James	January 1, 1968	46
The Davises attend a family reunion in Terre Haute, where Aunt Fran tries to again convince the children to move in with her, saying that Uncle Bill has no time for them.
47	17	"A Man's Place"	Charles Barton	John McGreevey	January 8, 1968	47
Mr. French reconsiders his vocation as a gentleman's gentleman after a friend invites him to go into a joint restaurant venture.
48	18	"The Great Kow-Tow"	Charles Barton	John McGreevey	January 15, 1968	48
Uncle Bill befriends a Chinese family with a lonely grandfather. When Buffy and Jody meet and interact with him, he discovers a new lease on life.
49	19	"The Fish Watchers"	Charles Barton	Jane Klove & Ted Sherdeman	January 22, 1968	49
Uncle Bill is spending more time away from the kids and tries to fill the gap by giving them a fish tank. One annoying problem after another ensues.
50	20	"The Day Nothing Happened"	Charles Barton	Henry Garson & Edmund Beloin	January 29, 1968	50
A blizzard interrupts Uncle Bill's vacation plans and Cissy's date, and the entire family is snowbound in the apartment.
51	21	"A House in the Country"	Charles Barton	Ed James	February 5, 1968	51
Uncle Bill believes the city is not good for the kids and arranges to buy a house out in the country, which upsets the kids because they've bonded well with others in the city.
52	22	"A Matter of Tonsils"	Charles Barton	Henry Garson & Edmund Beloin	February 12, 1968	52
Buffy is hospitalized for a tonsillectomy, and when Jody starts complaining about his own tonsils, everyone is convinced it's a call for attention...until the doctor says otherwise.
53	23	"A Member of the Family"	Charles Barton	Henry Garson & Edmund Beloin	February 19, 1968	53
Cissy's art class assignment has her drawing caricatures of the family, excepting Mr. French, who feels left out.
54	24	"His and Hers"	Charles Barton	Joseph Hoffman	February 26, 1968	54
Uncle Bill meets a single mom with two kids at a school open house, and trouble erupts when the two sets of kids interact negatively.
55	25	"The New Cissy"	Charles Barton	John McGreevey	March 4, 1968	55
Cissy believes she's unattractive to boys, so Uncle Bill enrolls her into courses intended to refine her demeanor.
56	26	"The Family Outing"	Charles Barton	Phil Leslie	March 11, 1968	56
The Davis family strikes up a camping trip in the great outdoors, but only Uncle Bill and Jody end up having fun.
57	27	"Mr. French's Holiday"	Charles Barton	Lois Hire	March 18, 1968	57
Mr. French's two-week holiday alone ends up gaining one Davis child at a time along the way.
58	28	"The Beasley Story"	Charles Barton	Joseph Hoffman	March 25, 1968	58
During a struggle over Mrs. Beasley, Buffy and Jody rip her arm off, and it becomes trauma time for the twins during a visit to the doll hospital.
59	29	"The Baby Sitters"	Charles Barton	Rita Lakin	April 1, 1968	59
When Uncle Bill and Mr. French have commitments one night, Cissy subcontracts out to a friend, who subcontracts out to her mom, who subcontracts out to...
60	30	"Family Portrait"	Charles Barton	John McGreevey	April 8, 1968	60
Uncle Bill decides to end his overseas traveling and become a full-time 'dad' when he returns from a business trip to find Buffy has a new tooth, Jody has a new friend, and Cissy's hairstyle has changed.

=== Season 3 (1968–69) ===
No. overall	No. in season	Title	Directed by	Written by	Original release date	Prod. code
61	1	"The Latch Key Kid"	Charles Barton	Story by : Douglas Dick & Peggy Chantler Dick; Teleplay by : Peggy Chantler Dick	September 23, 1968	8022–0137
Jody seems to have more independence than Buffy, so Buffy befriends a young girl, Lana (Susan Neher), whose mother is largely absent, leaving her to fend for herself. Lana comes to realize she craves the kind of family love Buffy has and breaks down crying in front of Buffy.
62	2	"By A Whisker"	Charles Barton	Henry Garson & Edmund Beloin	September 30, 1968	8022–0132
Jody wants to join a boys' club, which excepts his too-young age on one condition: that he performs a dare involving Mr. French's beard.
63	3	"A Waltz From Vienna"	Charles Barton	Charles R. Marion & Hannibal Coons	October 7, 1968	8022–0135
Cissy is wooed by a young Austrian royal, who courts her for a visit to Austria and marriage. Cissy is adamant she is mature and ready enough, but Uncle Bill has a different opinion.
64	4	"Your Friend, Jody"	Charles Barton	Phil Davis	October 14, 1968	8022–0130
A friend of Uncle Bill, who also has a low boy-to-high-girl ratio in the family, convinces Bill that they need to send their boys to boys' camp to do boy-stuff. The boys pretend to like it, but time tells otherwise.
65	5	"The Substitute Teacher"	Charles Barton	Henry Garson & Edmund Beloin	October 21, 1968	8022–0134
Jody develops a crush on a substitute teacher, and the reason is soon discovered: the teacher looks exactly like his late mother.
66	6	"Oliver"	Charles Barton	Joseph Hoffman	November 4, 1968	8022–0138
Buffy and Jody stretch the truth about having a 'friend' over, as the friend is a dog they agreed to dog-sit. The large dog tries to intimidate Uncle Bill out of the home.
67	7	"Christmas Came A Little Early"	Charles Barton	Elroy Schwartz	November 11, 1968	8022–0136
Buffy befriends a schoolmate, Eve (Eve Plumb), and discovers she is terminally ill. She recruits Uncle Bill to help make her better, but the poor prognosis inspires the family to do something nice for Eve. Trivia: Eve is the 2nd 'Brady' to appear on Family Affair; Robert Reed appeared in the Season One episode "Think Deep".
68	8	"The Unsound of Music"	Charles Barton	Henry Garson & Edmund Beloin	November 18, 1968	8022–0155
Buffy and Jody participate in a school singing program, but Jody outshines Buffy. Uncle Bill enlists the help of a talented friend to assist Buffy's desire to perform.
69	9	"Albertine"	Charles Barton	Ernestine Barton	December 2, 1968	8022–0151
A young, fatherless girl invents a father, who is famous at many things, to gain acceptance and feel self-worth. Buffy, Jody and Uncle Bill help Albertine come to terms with the reality of the situation.
70	10	"A Matter of Choice"	Charles Barton	John McGreevey	December 9, 1968	8022–0133
Cissy's friend takes advantage of her in order to do things her parents wouldn't approve, while Uncle Bill decides that violent TV shows need to be replaced with fairy-tale books...and discovering there is no 'happily ever after' after all.
71	11	"Ciao, Uncle Bill"	Charles Barton	Austin Kalish & Irma Kalish	December 16, 1968	8022–0131
Uncle Bill falls for a woman in Italy, who soon discovers he is not too willing to just leave his family behind to start a new life with her when she insists on starting one of her own.
72	12	"A Nanny for All Seasons"	Charles Barton	John McGreevey	December 23, 1968	8022–0140
Feeling the pressure from his peers, Mr. French starts giving the children the cold shoulder.
73	13	"Family Plan"	Charles Barton	Austin Kalish & Irma Kalish	December 30, 1968	8022–0149
Uncle Bill breaks his leg skiing and becomes the target of a competition of care from both his girlfriend and the kids. Eventually, Uncle Bill discovers the kids care more than she does.
74	14	"To Love With Buffy"	Charles Barton	Henry Garson & Edmund Beloin	January 6, 1969	8022–0143
Puerto Rico becomes the destination for Uncle Bill and Buffy, while another female jeopardizes the time between them.
75	15	"A Family Group"	Charles Barton	Austin Kalish & Irma Kalish	January 13, 1969	8022–0144
Cissy entertains the daughter of an acting couple; although Cissy envies the girl, the girl envies Cissy more because her own parents are divorcing and she longs for a stable family environment.
76	16	"A Lesson for Grown-Ups"	Charles Barton	Elroy Schwartz	January 20, 1969	8022–0154
When a bridge which Uncle Bill's company built collapses and Bill chooses to face the music, he discovers he doesn't have to do it alone when the kids all chip in to help.
77	17	"Oh, To Be in England"	Charles Barton	Henry Garson & Edmund Beloin	January 27, 1969	8022–0142
Uncle Bill prepares to move the family to England in anticipation for a prolonged construction assignment. The rest of the family is intrigued, until the prospect dissolves.
78	18	"A Matter of Privacy"	Charles Barton	Burt Styler	February 3, 1969	8022–0139
Uncle Bill discovers a competitor has been bugging his office to outbid him; Buffy and Jody's friend woos them to help tape-record others' private matters as a joke. The end result for the twins' friend is not a good one.
79	19	"Lost in Spain: Part 1"	Charles Barton	John McGreevey	February 10, 1969	8022–0146
The Davis family takes a vacation in Spain; in an oversight, Mr. French loses Buffy and Jody on a bus. Cissy develops a relationship with a Spanish boy.
80	20	"Lost in Spain: Part 2"	Charles Barton	John McGreevey	February 17, 1969	8022–0147
As Uncle Bill, Mr. French and Cissy frantically search for Buffy and Jody, the twins are receiving help from a poor local farm couple.
81	21	"Lost in Spain: Part 3"	Charles Barton	John McGreevey	February 24, 1969	8022–0148
Buffy and Jody end up being reunited with the family at last.
82	22	"A Diller, A Dollar"	Charles Barton	Henry Garson & Edmund Beloin	March 3, 1969	8022–0145
Buffy develops a crush on a boy in her class and, thinking he doesn't like girls smarter than him, decides to slip on her classwork, to her teacher's--and Uncle Bill's--dismay.
83	23	"The Young Man from Bolivia"	Charles Barton	Austin Kalish & Irma Kalish	March 10, 1969	8022–0157
Jody hosts a young Bolivian boy, the son of a business acquaintance of Uncle Bill's, and becomes jealous when he feels the boy is getting more attention than him.
84	24	"Speak for Yourself, Mr. French"	Charles Barton	Henry Garson & Edmund Beloin	March 17, 1969	8022–0150
Mr. French is wooed by a young woman and decides he may be in love with her...all the while oblivious that her real target is Uncle Bill.
85	25	"The Flip Side"	Charles Barton	Roy Kammerman	March 24, 1969	8022–0141
Cissy is wooed by a famous teen singer and is convinced that he loves her. When she travels to a town he's performing at, she discovers he's repeating the same program to other girls there.
86	26	"The Matter of Dignity"	Charles Barton	Douglas Dick & Peggy Chantler Dick & John McGreevey	March 31, 1969	8022–0152
Mr. French is accused of sending worrisome letters to a woman, and he & Uncle Bill seek out the real culprit.
87	27	"Flower Power"	Charles Barton	Cynthia Lindsay	April 7, 1969	8022–0153
Hippies become a target of interest for Cissy, and after investigating them she discovers she might want to be one of them. Uncle Bill has differing thoughts.
88	28	"My Man, the Star"	Charles Barton	Austin Kalish & Irma Kalish	April 14, 1969	8022–0156
Convinced that he is performing as Henry VIII for a credible film producer, it's soon revealed that the producer only wants to make a farce out of Mr. French's talent. Worried Mr. French's reputation may be smeared, Uncle Bill comes to the rescue.

=== Season 4 (1969–70) ===
No. overall	No. in season	Title	Directed by	Written by	Original release date	Prod. code
89	1	"No Uncle is an Island"	Charles Barton	Austin Kalish & Irma Kalish	September 25, 1969	8022–0177
Buffy, Jody, Cissy and Mr. French give Uncle Bill an entire weekend of peace and quiet, which is soon spoiled by friends and neighbors dropping in.
90	2	"Wings of an Angel"	Charles Barton	Roswell Rogers	October 2, 1969	8022–0163
Uncle Bill puts up an acquaintance who has just been released from prison, which has the rest of the family on edge.
91	3	"Uncle Prince Charming"	Charles Barton	Rita Lakin	October 9, 1969	8022–0161
A friend of Cissy's develops an unhealthy obsession for Uncle Bill, leaving him at odds on how to let the girl down easy and effectively.
92	4	"Cissy's Apartment"	Charles Barton	Si Rose	October 16, 1969	8022–0160
Cissy decides it's time to strike out on her own and moves into an apartment with a roommate. The family, however, become frequent visitors out of concern, to Cissy's dismay.
93	5	"The Jody Affair"	Charles Barton	Roland Wolpert	October 23, 1969	8022–0165
Jody is framed by a classmate for breaking a window at school and begins to develop a negative reputation with the school officials for it.
94	6	"With this Ring"	Charles Barton	Henry Garson & Edmund Beloin	October 30, 1969	8022–0180
An increasing number of Cissy's friends are getting engaged or married, pressuring Cissy to put the pressure on Gregg to commit.
95	7	"What's Funny About a Broken Leg?"	Charles Barton	Austin Kalish & Irma Kalish	November 6, 1969	8022–0179
Buffy breaks her leg during a baseball game, and when her plan to see the circus is cancelled, the family brings the circus to her. Trivia: This episode was written and produced in haste, as Anissa Jones broke her leg in real life on 16 April 1969 and had to be incorporated into the plotline. Anissa later rebroke her leg on 2 August 1969 in a beach accident.
96	8	"The Birthday Boy"	Charles Barton	Blanche Hanalis	November 13, 1969	8022–0158
Buffy and Jody enlist Cissy's help in setting up a birthday party for Mr. French.
97	9	"The Stowaway"	Charles Barton	Austin Kalish & Irma Kalish	November 20, 1969	8022–0159
Buffy and Jody befriend a runaway orphan and hide him in their apartment, shifting him from room to room to avoid Uncle Bill and Mr. French.
98	10	"Number One Boy"	Charles Barton	William H. Wright	December 4, 1969	8022–0178
Uncle Bill returns from Hong Kong with an acquaintance who wants to get a start in America, but frustrates Mr. French's life when he begins taking over most of the duties.
99	11	"A Tale of Two Travels"	Charles Barton	Rocci Chatfield	December 11, 1969	8022–0162
Cissy decides to vacation around New York while the rest of the family vacation in Boston, but it's not long before Cissy misses them...and vice versa.
100	12	"Maudie"	Charles Barton	Henry Garson & Edmund Beloin	December 18, 1969	8022–0182
A successful female friend of Mr. French's entices him to England in hopes of beginning a relationship with him.
101	13	"Goodbye Harold"	Charles Barton	John McGreevey	December 25, 1969	8022–0173
Buffy and Jody contend with two pet hamsters which are frequent escape artists, which take it one level higher when they escape the apartment.
102	14	"The Girl Graduate"	Charles Barton	Austin Kalish & Irma Kalish	January 1, 1970	8022–0181
Cissy makes plans to go to an all-night party after graduating from high school.
103	15	"Grandpa, Sir"	Charles Barton	Brad Radnitz	January 8, 1970	8022–0170
The kids' grandfather visits them but has trouble getting used to them as older than he lasts remembers them. Complicating matters is that the children don't recall him at all.
104	16	"Marooned"	Charles Barton	Henry Garson & Edmund Beloin	January 15, 1970	8022–0174
Uncle Bill invites Mr. French and the twins to Vermont, but a snowstorm en route interrupts their trip, forcing them to seek shelter in a cabin and compels Mr. French to go into survival-mode in order to protect the children.
105	17	"Mr. Osaki's Tree"	Charles Barton	Blanche Hanalis	January 22, 1970	8022–0171
A Japanese friend of Jody's gives him a bonsai tree to take care of, and Jody worries that the bonsai's apparent dying means that his sick friend could be dying, too.
106	18	"The Language of Love"	Charles Barton	Henry Garson & Edmund Beloin	January 29, 1970	8022–0167
Buffy asks Uncle Bill to help out her deaf friend so she can hear again.
107	19	"The Inheritance"	Charles Barton	Elroy Schwartz	February 5, 1970	8022–0169
Buffy and Jody inherit a small amount of money, which is a fortune to them, and they debate on how best to spend it.
108	20	"There Goes New York"	Charles Barton	Burt Styler	February 12, 1970	8022–0164
The twins hear someone predict a tidal wave will wipe out New York City and refuse to accept being told that it won't happen.
109	21	"Wouldn't It Be Loverly"	Charles Barton	Robert Pirosh	February 19, 1970	8022–0166
A spoiled classmate has Buffy and Jody convinced that getting your way in everything is the best way, and Uncle Bill and Mr. French allow the twins this latitude to see if it's all they believe it would be.
110	22	"Boys Against Girls"	Charles Barton	Seaman Jacobs & Fred S. Fox	February 26, 1970	8022–0172
Jody stands up for Buffy when his stickball colleagues make fun of girls...including Buffy.
111	23	"The Old Cowhand"	Charles Barton	Walter Black	March 5, 1970	8022–0168
Jody meets a cowboy movie hero he idolizes and soon comes to realize that his hero is no longer the young cowboy he used to be.
112	24	"Angel in the Family"	Charles Barton	Austin Kalish & Irma Kalish	March 12, 1970	8022–0183
Mr. French and Uncle Bill find themselves in opposing camps regarding a girl who wants to be an actress: Mr. French intercedes for the girl's mother to dissuade the girl, while Uncle Bill lands the girl her first acting job.
113	25	"Family in Paradise: Part 1"	Charles Barton	Austin Kalish & Irma Kalish	March 26, 1970	8022–0175
Uncle Bill takes the family to Tahiti for a vacation and everyone is enthralled with the easygoing way of life there.
114	26	"Family in Paradise: Part 2"	Charles Barton	Austin Kalish & Irma Kalish	April 2, 1970	8022–0176
Taking a clue from the family's enjoyment of casual Tahiti life, Uncle Bill considers moving the family there permanently, but eventually the family discovers they miss their structured life in New York City.

=== Season 5 (1970–71) ===
No. overall	No. in season	Title	Directed by	Written by	Original release date	Prod. code
115	1	"The Good Neighbors"	Charles Barton	John McGreevey	September 17, 1970	8022–0195
Buffy and Jody discover that their fellow tenants seem detached from neighborly graces and decide to throw a neighbor party in the lobby to get everyone acquainted.
116	2	"Deserted Isle, Manhattan Style"	Charles Barton	Elroy Schwartz	September 24, 1970	8022–0193
While Uncle Bill and Mr. French are away, Cissy wants to go on a trip with her boyfriend and subcontracts to another babysitter to watch Buffy and Jody...and the babysitter never arrives due to a snowstorm.
117	3	"Eastward, Ho"	Charles Barton	Henry Garson & Edmund Beloin	October 1, 1970	8022–0186
Uncle Bill allows a Chinese woman to stay at the apartment while she is engaged to marry a Chinese friend of his. After Cissy and Gregg take the girl out for the evening, the girl changes her mind about her arranged marriage.
118	4	"Meet Emily"	Charles Barton	Austin Kalish & Irma Kalish	October 8, 1970	8022–0184
Uncle Bill brings in a female assistant, Emily (Nancy Walker), for Mr. French, who seems competent but a complete personality opposite to Mr. French, to his frustration. However, she soon endears herself to everyone in the home.
119	5	"The Return of Maudie"	Charles Barton	Henry Garson & Edmund Beloin	October 15, 1970	8022–0202
Mr. French's friend from England visits. Could she be trying to entice Mr. French once more?
120	6	"It Can't Be Five Years"	Charles Barton	Austin Kalish & Irma Kalish	October 22, 1970	8022–0205
The kids come to realize they've been with Uncle Bill for five years and decide to throw a party to celebrate, but Uncle Bill almost misses it due to his work schedule.
121	7	"Travels with Cissy"	Charles Barton	Henry Garson & Edmund Beloin	October 29, 1970	8022–0204
Uncle Bill intervenes in Cissy's desire to marry Gregg, taking her to a party to distract her...and she is indeed distracted by another man there named Steve and decides she's no longer in love with Gregg. Steve then later proposes to Cissy.
122	8	"Stamp of Approval"	Charles Barton	Brad Radnitz	November 5, 1970	8022–0189
Uncle Bill and Jody find themselves vying for female attention: Bill for a job and Jody for a stamp for his collection.
123	9	"And Baby Makes Eight"	Charles Barton	Austin Kalish & Irma Kalish	November 12, 1970	8022–0191
Cissy hosts a pregnant friend whose husband is out of town; to everyone's surprise, the friend delivers her baby while at the Davis residence.
124	10	"Say Uncle"	Charles Barton	Brad Radnitz	November 19, 1970	8022–0206
Jody and a classmate try to get their parents to fight each other to see who's the best.
125	11	"Class Clown"	Charles Barton	Seaman Jacobs & Fred S. Fox	November 26, 1970	8022–0194
Uncle Bill's date ends up being a comedian who has trouble leaving her act on the stage.
126	12	"The Unsinkable Mr. French"	Charles Barton	Austin Kalish & Irma Kalish	December 3, 1970	8022–0203
Mr. French has his hands full micromanaging constant crises in the Davis household...and may just be on the cusp of a new crisis which threatens to be the straw which breaks the camel's back.
127	13	"Wish You Were Here"	Charles Barton	Blanche Hanalis	December 10, 1970	8022–0200
Uncle Bill takes the family on vacation to Terre Haute to stay in touch with their roots.
128	14	"Feat of Clay"	Charles Barton	Joseph Hoffman	December 17, 1970	8022–0192
Buffy and Jody accidentally break Uncle Bill's Colombian statue and try to fix it without it being obvious.
129	15	"Heroes Are Born"	Charles Barton	Stanley Roberts	December 31, 1970	8022–0207
A football hero of Jody's is suspended for placing bets, leaving Jody disillusioned.
130	16	"Nobody Here But Us Uncles"	Charles Barton	John McGreevey	January 7, 1971	8022–0199
Worried that Uncle Bill will be alone when they grow older and move out, Buffy and Jody scramble to play matchmaker for him.
131	17	"Too Late, Too Soon"	Charles Barton	Austin Kalish & Irma Kalish	January 14, 1971	8022–0196
Mr. French's assistant Emily plays matchmaker to unite Mr. French and Miss Favisham, then turns around and plays matchbreaker to her son and Cissy.
132	18	"The Littlest Exile"	Charles Barton	Roland Wolpert	January 21, 1971	8022–0198
Buffy and Jody befriend a boy who, along with his mom, stay at the Davis home as refugees, as their father is a foreign head of state whose country is in turmoil and militants seek to find him and his family.
133	19	"Put Your Dreams Away"	Charles Barton	John McGreevey	January 28, 1971	8022–0187
Cissy's Peace Corps friend tries to entice Cissy to join up and move to Chile with him.
134	20	"The Joiners"	Charles Barton	Henry Garson & Edmund Beloin	February 4, 1971	8022–0197
Buffy tries to join a group she is interested in, yet they are initially resistant due to her being too young...until Uncle Bill tries to get her in on exception and learns a lesson himself in bending the rules.
135	21	"Cinder-Emily"	Charles Barton	Walter Blank	February 11, 1971	8022–0201
Buffy and Jody try to help Emily attend her son's graduation, but she needs a dress...and a date.
136	22	"Goodbye, Mrs. Beasley"	Charles Barton	Bonnie Souleles	February 18, 1971	8022–0190
Buffy faces scorn from friends who tell her she's too old for Mrs. Beasley. After meeting a real Mrs. Beasley who runs a toy store, Buffy finally surrenders Mrs. Beasley, lamenting "I didn't know growing up meant giving away the things you love."
137	23	"Buffy's Fair Lady"	Charles Barton	Burt Styler	February 25, 1971	8022–0188
Trying to help a shy friend fit in, Buffy runs into problems while trying to accomplish the goal.
138	24	"You Can Fight City Hall"	Charles Barton	Blanche Hanalis	March 4, 1971	8022–0185
Buffy and Jody discover a great place to form a children's park, but they discover it's about to be turned into a parking lot and decide to take on city hall to preserve their dream. This is the final episode.
