= Family Affair (1966 TV series) =

American sitcom (1966–1971)

- Genre: Sitcom
- Created by: Edmund L. Hartmann; Don Fedderson
- Directed by: Charles Barton; William D. Russell
- Starring: Brian Keith; Sebastian Cabot; Kathy Garver; Johnny Whitaker; Anissa Jones
- Theme music composer: Frank De Vol
- Composers: Jeff Alexander; Nathan Scott; Frank De Vol
- Country of origin: United States
- Original language: English
- No. of seasons: 5
- No. of episodes: 138 (list of episodes)

Production
- Executive producer: Don Fedderson
- Producers: Edmund Beloin; Henry Garson; Edmund L. Hartmann
- Cinematography: Stanley Cortez; Paul Ivano; Michael P. Joyce; Philip Tannura
- Editors: James H. King; Charles Van Enger; Richard L. Van Enger; Sam Vitale
- Camera setup: Single-camera
- Running time: 25 minutes
- Production companies: Don Fedderson Productions; Family Affair Company

Original release
- Network: CBS
- Release: September 12, 1966 – March 4, 1971

Family Affair is an American sitcom starring Brian Keith and Sebastian Cabot that aired on CBS from September 12, 1966, to March 4, 1971. The series explored the trials of well-to-do engineer and bachelor Bill Davis (Keith) as he attempted to raise his brother's orphaned children in his luxury New York City apartment. Davis' traditional English gentleman's gentleman, Mr. Giles French (Cabot), also had adjustments to make as he became saddled with the responsibility of caring for 15-year-old Cissy (Kathy Garver) and the six-year-old twins, Jody (Johnny Whitaker) and Buffy (Anissa Jones).

Family Affair ran for 138 episodes in five seasons. The show was created and produced by Edmund Hartmann and Don Fedderson, also known for My Three Sons and The Millionaire.

== Storyline ==
Indiana native William "Bill" Davis is a successful civil engineer who develops major projects all over the world. A wealthy bachelor, Bill lives in a large apartment on New York City's Upper East Side, and has a British manservant, Giles French (usually called "Mr. French" or just "French"), as his valet.

A year prior to the series, Bill's brother Bob and his wife Mary were killed in a car crash in Indiana, orphaning their three children – teenager Cissy, and younger twins Jody and Buffy. His other relatives believe that Bill is the one most capable of supporting them, so the three move in with him in New York. Consequently, Bill's bachelor lifestyle gets turned upside down.

Initially, "Uncle Bill" is none too pleased to have the three youngsters living with him, but he soon grows fond of them. Mr. French, who effectively becomes a nanny in addition to his valet duties, is also flustered by the erratic situation at first, but he, too, develops an affinity for them. Over time, the bachelor, the butler, and the three orphans find themselves becoming a close-knit family.

=== Other characters ===
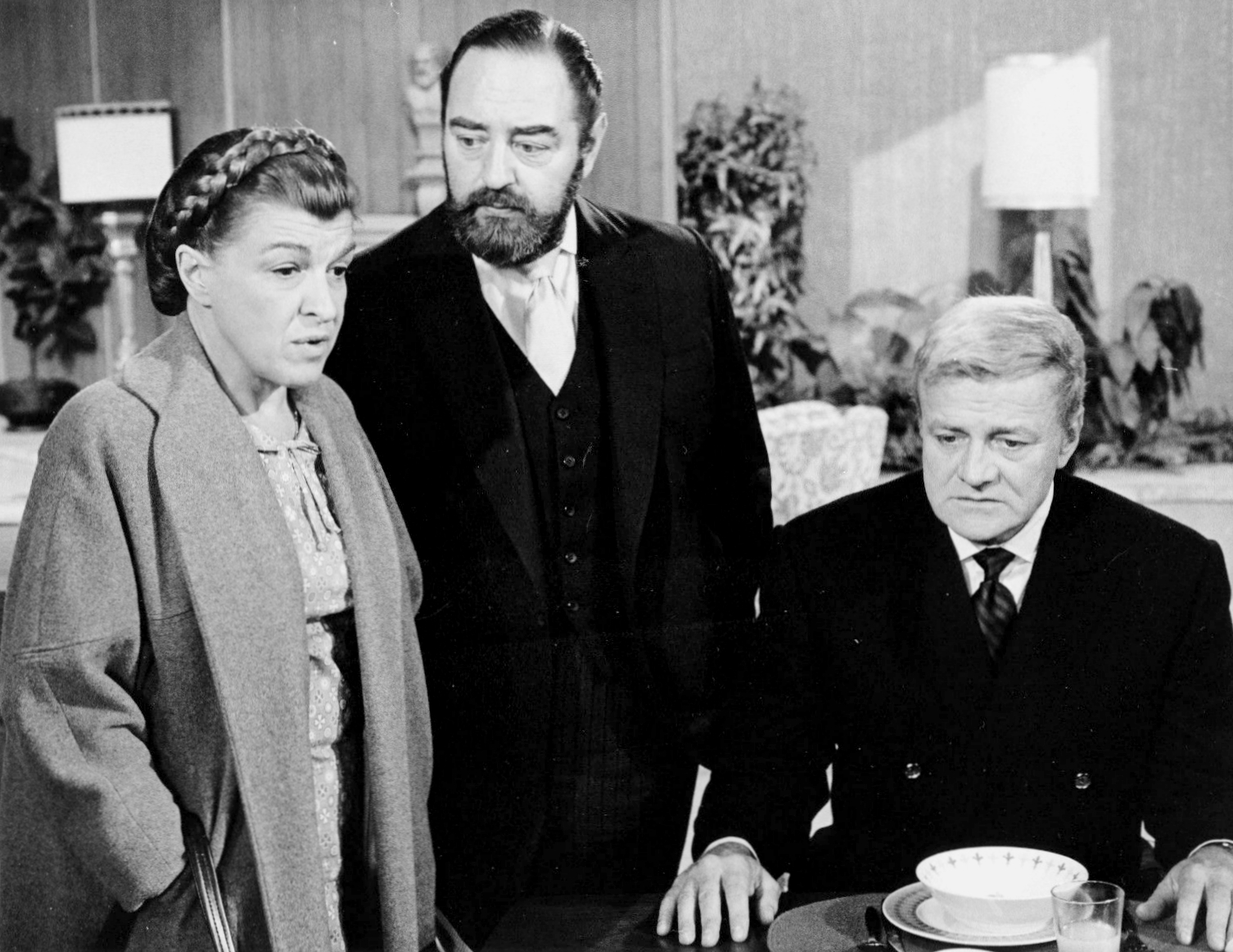
Nancy Walker, Sebastian Cabot and Brian Keith, 1970

When Sebastian Cabot became ill, Giles' brother, Nigel "Niles" French (John Williams) was introduced. He worked for the Davis family for nine episodes in 1967, while Giles was said to be touring with the Queen in the Commonwealth countries. In the final season, Bill hired a part-time housekeeper, Emily Turner (Nancy Walker), to assist Mr. French.

Various other characters were also seen regularly, including several acquaintances of Mr. French who are in service (most notably Miss Faversham, played by Heather Angel), colleagues of Bill's, and friends of Cissy's.

== Production ==
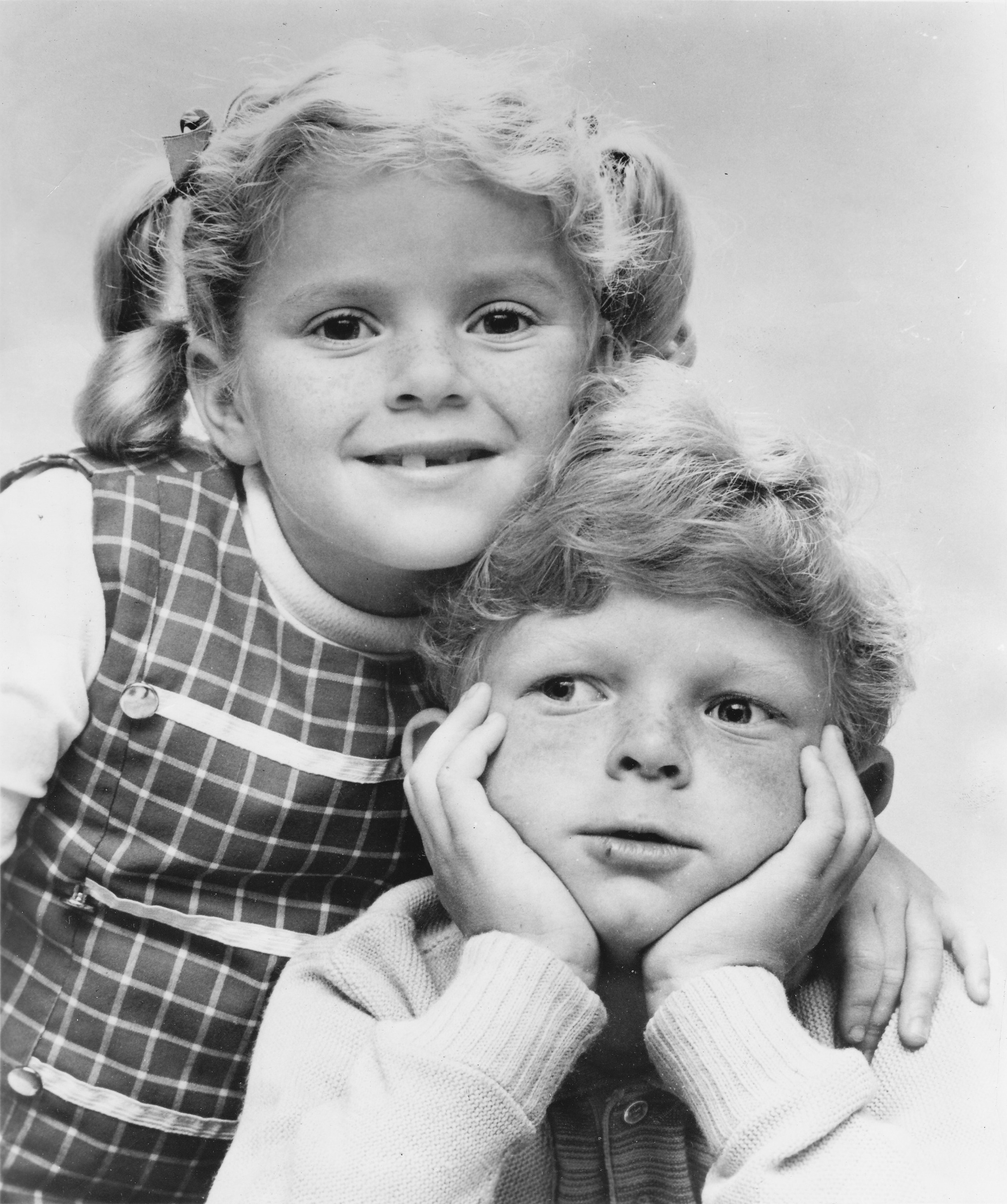
Anissa Jones and Johnny Whitaker, 1967

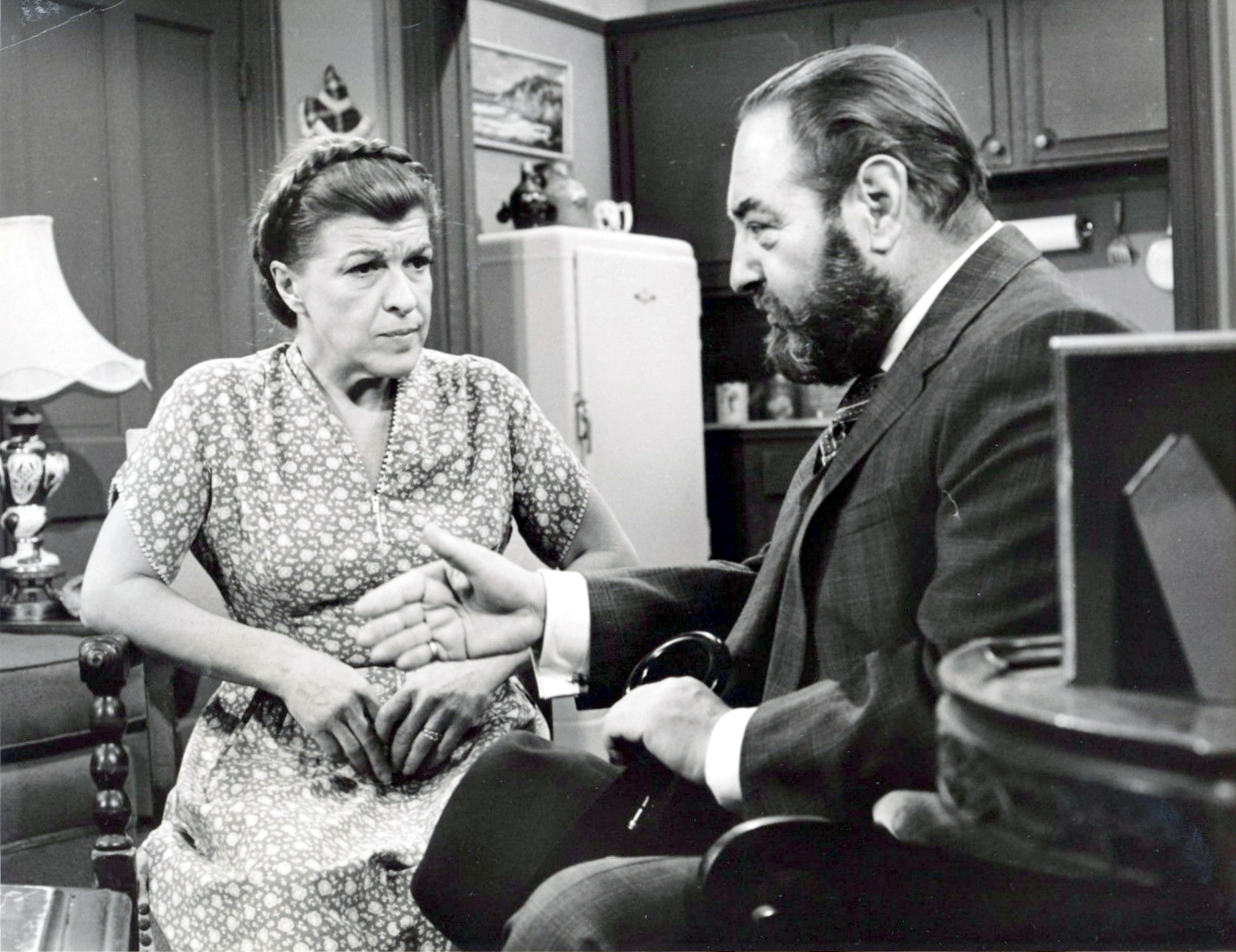
Nancy Walker and Sebastian Cabot, 1970

Due to Don Fedderson's strong track record, Family Affair was sold to CBS even before the pilot had been filmed.

As Fedderson's other program, My Three Sons, had done for Fred MacMurray, Family Affair used a 60-day production schedule to accommodate Brian Keith. All of his scenes for the season would be shot in two 30-day blocks, while his co-stars would fill in after the actor's work was completed. This enabled Fedderson to harness movie stars like Keith and MacMurray into television commitments, while still enabling each to make motion pictures. As a result, each season had a single director for each of the 30-odd scripts.

Since the show's child actors (Whitaker and Jones) could legally work only eight hours a day, scenes with them were shot first, and as a result the cast and crew were often filming as many as four episodes at the same time.

Due to the popularity of the series with girls, Buffy's doll, "Mrs. Beasley" (which she often carried with her), was marketed as a Mattel talking toy in the United States. Mattel went on to produce two additional dolls, as well, patterned after Buffy: the "Tutti"-sized Buffy and larger "Small Talk Buffy" (talking doll), both of which featured accompanying miniature Mrs. Beasley dolls.

== Opening ==
The theme song was composed by veteran television composer Frank DeVol. The opening featured credits appearing over a kaleidoscopic view of a multicolored array of gems and precious stones.

Most episodes in the fifth season opened with either Sebastian Cabot or the twins greeting viewers. Cabot says, "Good evening, so nice of you to join us." And the twins say, "Hi!" "Welcome to our show!" Closing the episode, Cabot would say, "It's been very good of you to watch and we do hope to see you again next week on Family Affair." And the twins say, "Thanks for watching. We'll see you next week." "On Family Affair."

== Cast ==
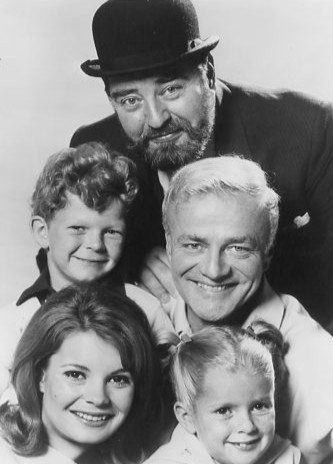
Main cast: Kathy Garver (Cissy), Anissa Jones (Buffy), Johnny Whitaker (Jody), Brian Keith (Bill Davis) & Sebastian Cabot (Mr. Giles French)

- Brian Keith as William "Bill" Davis - The part was first offered to Glenn Ford, who turned it down. Keith also held part ownership of the show.
- Sebastian Cabot as Giles French
- Kathy Garver as Catherine "Cissy" Davis - Garver was cast at the last minute, in the middle of shooting the pilot, after the actress originally cast for the part gained 15 pounds on a trip to Europe. Garver, though playing a teenage girl, was 20 years old at the time of filming. No scenes were filmed with Garver's predecessor.
- Johnny Whitaker as Jonathan "Jody" Davis - Keith suggested Whitaker for the role. Jody and Buffy were originally supposed to be different ages, but after seeing how good Whitaker looked with Anissa Jones, who had already been cast, the producers decided to change them to twins.
- Anissa Jones as Ava Elizabeth "Buffy" Davis
- Heather Angel as Miss Faversham, Mr. French's friend
- John Williams as Nigel "Niles" French (season 1)
- John Hubbard as Ted Gaynor, Bill's business partner (season 1)
- Betty Lynn as Miss Lee, Bill's secretary (seasons 1–2)
- Sherry Alberoni as Sharon James, Cissy's girlfriend (seasons 1–3)
- Karl Lukas as Scotty Parker, the doorman (seasons 1–3)
- Gregg Fedderson (producer Don Fedderson's son) as Gregg Bartlett, Cissy's boyfriend (seasons 2–5) - While working on the show Fedderson started dating actress Kathy Garver in real life.
- Nancy Walker as Emily Turner (season 5)

=== Notable guest stars ===
- John Agar (episode 1.28)
- Herbert Anderson (episode 4.1)
- Dana Andrews (episode 4.2)
- Joan Blondell (episode 2.13)
- Lynn Borden
- Richard Bull as the apartment manager
- Terry Burnham (episode 2.15) as Ingrid, (episode 4.4) as Rita Stone
- Veronica Cartwright (episode 3.27)
- Jackie Coogan (episode 2.7)
- Henry Corden (episode 1.8)
- Brian Donlevy (episode 1.15)
- Jamie Farr (episode 3.27) as a hippie
- Paul Fix (episode 4.15)
- Leif Garrett (episode 5.15)
- Linda Kaye Henning (episode 5.9)
- Kathleen Richards (episode 5.20)
- Sterling Holloway (episode 1.19) as Mr. Frack, the window-washer
- James Hong
- Clint Howard (episode 5.10)
- Martha Hyer (episode 2.14)
- Kym Karath (episode 5.22) as Wynn Cartter
- Andrea King (episode 1.17)
- Patric Knowles (episode 2.3)
- Anna Lee (episode 2.3)
- June Lockhart (episode 3.5)
- Myrna Loy (episode 1.20) as a maid candidate
- Keye Luke (episode 1.18)
- Ida Lupino (episode 4.12)
- Ann McCrea
- Lee Meriwether
- Erin Moran
- Butch Patrick (episode 3.2)
- Larry Pennell
- Eve Plumb (episode 3.7) as Eve, a terminally ill girl who lives in the apartment building
- Robert Reed (episode 1.14) as professor Julian Hill
- Pippa Scott (episode 2.30)
- Doris Singleton (episode 2.29)
- Ann Sothern (episode 2.17)
- Vic Tayback as a police officer
- Joyce Van Patten (episode 5.11)

== Post-series ==
Anissa Jones (who played Buffy) died of a drug overdose in 1976, aged 18. Sebastian Cabot (who played Mr. French) died of a stroke in 1977, aged 59. Brian Keith (who played Uncle Bill) died by gunshot suicide in 1997, aged 75, two months after the suicide of his daughter, and an undetermined amount of time after he was diagnosed with cancer.

== Episodes ==
Season	Episodes	Originally released		Rank	Rating	Tied with
Season	Episodes	First released	Last released	Rank	Rating	Tied with
1	30	September 12, 1966	May 15, 1967	14	22.6	The Dean Martin Show
2	30	September 11, 1967	April 8, 1968	4	25.5	Gunsmoke; Bonanza
3	28	September 23, 1968	April 14, 1969	5	25.2	—N/a
4	26	September 25, 1969	April 2, 1970	5	24.2	—N/a
5	24	September 17, 1970	March 4, 1971	—N/a	—N/a	—N/a

== Home media ==
MPI Home Video (under license from the Don Fedderson estate) has released all five seasons of Family Affair on DVD in Region 1.

DVD name	Ep. #	Release date	Special features / notes
Season One	30	June 27, 2006	Family Affair: Behind the Scenes with Kathy Garver; Photo Gallery
Season Two	30	November 21, 2006	"An Affair to Remember" (interview with Kathy Garver); "Memories" (Five-minute piece with Garver showing Family Affair memorabilia)
Season Three	28	March 27, 2007	The Family Affair Reunion Special
Season Four	26	October 30, 2007	A Conversation with Johnny Whitaker; "The Child Stars"
Season Five	24	February 26, 2008	A visit by Kathy Garver to the CBS Studio City lot where the series was filmed
The Complete Series	138	November 25, 2008	Repackaging of Seasons 1–5 in a slimmer case

== Awards and nominations ==
Year	Association	Category	Nominee	Result
1967	Emmy Awards	Outstanding Writing Achievement in Comedy	Edmund L. Hartmann; For episode "Buffy"	Nominated
1967	Emmy Awards	Outstanding Directorial Achievement in Comedy	William D. Russell	Nominated
1967	Emmy Awards	Outstanding Continued Performance by an Actor in a Leading Role in a Comedy Series	Brian Keith	Nominated
1968	Emmy Awards	Outstanding Continued Performance by an Actor in a Leading Role in a Comedy Series	Brian Keith	Nominated
1968	Emmy Awards	Outstanding Continued Performance by an Actor in a Leading Role in a Comedy Series	Sebastian Cabot	Nominated
1968	Emmy Awards	Outstanding Comedy Series	Edmund L. Hartmann	Nominated
1969	Emmy Awards	Outstanding Continued Performance by an Actor in a Leading Role in a Comedy Series	Brian Keith	Nominated
1969	Emmy Awards	Outstanding Comedy Series	Edmund L. Hartmann	Nominated
1971	Golden Globe Awards	Best Television Series – Musical or Comedy	Family Affair	Nominated
2004	TV Land Awards	Best Broadcast Butler	Sebastian Cabot	Won
2010	Young Artist Awards	Former Child Star "Lifetime Achievement" Award	Kathy Garver	Honored

== Remake television series ==
A remake of Family Affair aired on The WB from September 12, 2002, to March 13, 2003. The remake was produced by Sid & Marty Krofft Pictures, Pariah Films, and Turner Television. Gary Cole played the role of "Uncle Bill" Davis and Tim Curry played Mr. Giles French. Fifteen episodes were produced, including the one-hour pilot, but only thirteen episodes were aired by The WB.

== Spinoff television series ==
A Travis Hunt production titled Aunt Cissy and starring Cissy actress Kathy Garver was "a new family comedy that is not exactly a sequel to Family Affair... but it has elements of the premise of that classic TV series, plus a few surprises." Six episodes were produced, but it unclear if they were ever released for viewing.

== Appearances in other media ==
Gold Key Comics, an imprint of Western Publishing, published four issues of a Family Affair comic book series from January to October 1970.

Merchandising efforts centered on Anissa Jones' "Buffy" character. Several books were published, including the 1970 hardback Family Affair: Buffy Finds a Star by Gladys Baker Bond and Buffy's Cookbook. There were dolls (Mattel's "Small Talk Buffy" and Mrs. Beasley, Buffy's doll on the show) and various other toys.

A Mrs. Beasley doll, with her glasses missing, appears in the music video for the song "California Tuffy" by the Geraldine Fibbers.

In Police Academy 2: Their First Assignment, gang leader Zed (Bobcat Goldthwait) is seen tearfully watching the show in his hideout.

The 1982 the L.A. musical group Angel and the Reruns released a song named "Buffy Come Back" dealing with the "Buffy" actress Anissa Jones' teenage drug overdose.
