= List of The Addams Family episodes =

This is a list of all episodes of The Addams Family original black-and-white television series, that ran from 1964 until 1966, on the American Broadcasting Company.

== Series overview ==
| Season | Episodes | Originally released | |
| Season | Episodes | First released | Last released |
|---|---|---|---|
| 1 | 34 | September 18, 1964 | May 21, 1965 |
| 2 | 30 | September 17, 1965 | April 8, 1966 |
| Special | | October 30, 1977 | |

== Episodes ==
- (s) = Story
- (t) = Teleplay

=== Season 1 (1964–65) ===
| No. overall | No. in season | Title | Directed by | Written by | Original release date |
|---|---|---|---|---|---|
| 1 | 1 | "The Addams Family Goes to School" | Arthur Hiller | Seaman Jacobs & Ed James | September 18, 1964 |
When Gomez and Morticia keep Wednesday and Pugsley home from school, truant officer Sam Hilliard (Allyn Joslyn) pays a visit. After Hilliard sees the house and the children, he tells the principal they should stay home. However, Gomez and Morticia are persuaded to let the kids go to school. But they take action when a fairy tale book that depicts a violent action where a knight slaying a dragon saddens Wednesday. Gomez and Morticia wish to talk to Hilliard about it. When he refuses to come, Lurch goes and gets him. After some discussion, Hilliard says he agrees with them and will talk to the school board.: Madge Blake guest-stars as the principal Miss Comstock, Nydia Westman as Miss Morrison, and Rolfe Sedan as the postman.; Family mentioned: Cousin Imar, who has three arms.
| 2 | 2 | "Morticia and the Psychiatrist" | Jean Yarbrough | Hannibal Coons & Harry Winkler | September 25, 1964 |
Gomez and Morticia call in child psychiatrist Dr. Black (George O. Petrie) when Pugsley starts displaying normal childhood behavior and interests. Much to their horror and shame, Pugsley shows a sudden keen interest in joining the Boy Scouts and raising a puppy. Dr. Black recommends indulging the boy's new directions for a while, strange as they might seem. But, things don't get better and Morticia calls Dr. Black and tells him he must come over. When the Doctor sees the decor of the Addams house, he believes that is where the problem lies. After a talk with Pugsley, Dr. Black believes the boy has gotten his aggressions out, but in reality, Pugsley is back to his normal self.: Cartoon reference: The Pugsley character is in a Boy Scout uniform saluting in front of a mirror. The parents watch from an open door. The caption reads "Well, he certainly doesn't take after my side of the family".; Romance: Morticia's first use of the word "Bubele" prompts Gomez's comparatively modest reaction, which will become the more exaggerated "Tish, that's French" shtick as the series evolves.
| 3 | 3 | "Fester's Punctured Romance" | Sidney Lanfield | Jameson Brewer | October 2, 1964 |
Fester has taken to intercepting the daily newspaper deliveries. He's been scanning the lonely hearts columns looking for a bride. Fester finally fesses up and writes a letter, with Gomez happy to snap a picture to go with it. Days pass without a response. When Miss Carver (Merry Anders) appears at the door, she's mistaken for Fester's correspondent. She appears to be a desperate wanna-be housewife with suitcase in hand ready to move in. She's actually a door-to-door cosmetics saleswoman, and her smooth and mildly seductive sales pitch is mistaken for a callous disregard in matters of the heart. When she discovers what she's been mistaken for, she quickly leaves the house.: Family mentioned: Cousin Eustace (Morticia knits a sweater with a long neck). Grandpa Squint and Aunt Vendetta (who may or may not be alive, causing Gomez to check).; Note: The growling bearskin rug is named Bruno.
| 4 | 4 | "Gomez the Politician" | Jerry Hopper | Hannibal Coons & Harry Winkler | October 9, 1964 |
Election day is nearing, and Gomez is getting very excited. He puts up all his old campaign posters. All of Gomez's favorite candidates were losers. Sam Hilliard (Allyn Joslyn) is running for city council, and Gomez throws his support behind the man. Hilliard reluctantly accepts Gomez's support, because he is hoping for a large campaign contribution. However, Gomez declares that he'd like to see the money spent in certain ways. After hearing some of the Addams' suggestions, Hilliard wishes they would stay away from his campaign altogether. The family campaign on the streets for Hilliard. Hilliard loses in a landslide. Eddie Quillan appears as George Bass, Hilliard's campaign manager.: Family mentioned: Cousin Grisly's portrait of him facing a firing squad. Uncle "Kiss of Death" Blight, who masterminded the presidential campaigns of Al Smith, Wendell Willkie and Adlai Stevenson. Grandpa Squint, whom Abraham Lincoln supposedly begged for his political support but instead backed Stephen Douglas; Squint's role in the 1860 presidential election implies that he was born in the 1840s or earlier, yet Morticia mentions having had a conversation with him at some earlier point in her marriage to Gomez, at which point Squint would have been over a century old.; Cartoon reference: The neighbors are disturbed by Gomez sharpening the spikes on the fence.
| 5 | 5 | "The Addams Family Tree" | Jerry Hopper | Hannibal Coons, Harry Winkler & Lou Houston | October 16, 1964 |
Pugsley and Wednesday attend a birthday party for neighbor Harold Pomeroy. Morticia instructs her children to be modest about their advantages. The children come home early, saying Harold said his family was better and called them kooks. Outraged, Gomez hires Mr. Pomeroy's (Frank Nelson) genealogist, Professor Simms (Jonathan Hole), to examine the Addams' family tree for ancestors to flaunt at them. Meanwhile, Mr. Pomeroy completely changes his manner due to oil he thinks he's found on land owned by Gomez. Before the two meet up to discuss business, Simms spills the beans on several unsavory characters in Pomeroy's family tree, which actually impress Gomez and Morticia. During discussion of the land purchase, Gomez gushes over Pomeroy's blood-thirsty ancestors while Pomeroy, mortified, drives up his own price to keep Gomez from talking further.: Family mentioned: Cousin Bleak (who had a middle eye that drooped), Morticia's Cousin Curdle (implied to have at least one eye in the back of her head), Cousin Farouk (named as the owner of the leg jutting from the stuffed swordfish on the wall), Aunt Blemish (who is mistaken for a barn in a photo), Grandpa Slurp (mistaken for two people in a photo, has bucked teeth and a receding chin), Gomez's Cousin Clot (who was sentenced to the electric chair), Grand-Uncle Grisly (who was a traitor but only did it for the money), an unnamed family of Addamses who live up the Amazon River where the head of its family went missing, Mamoud Kali Pashka Addams (the Firebug of the Bosporus who burned the Library of Alexandria in 270 AD), Black Bart Addams and Bloody Addams (presumably pirates).; Note: The family's pet jaguar Fang is mentioned.
| 6 | 6 | "Morticia Joins the Ladies League" | Jean Yarbrough | Phil Leslie & Keith Fowler | October 23, 1964 |
Pugsley and Gomez visit Oscar Webber (Peter Leeds), who owns a failing circus. Pugsley befriends Gorgo, a gorilla. Gorgo follows them back to the Addams' house. Gomez hopes to find a spot for Gorgo in the household. To the dismay of Lurch, Gorgo shows an aptitude for some of the butler's tasks. Meanwhile, Morticia aspires to join a social club for women, The Ladies' League. Mrs. Magruder (Dorothea Neumann) and Mrs. Page visit Morticia at home. Gorgo locks Lurch in a closet and then serves tea to the ladies. But, things don't go well. Oscar comes to pick up Gorgo and is disappointed to see his killer gorilla domesticated. However, this new Gorgo winds up saving the circus.: Note: George Barrows, who played a gorilla in many films beginning in 1934, gets a rare credit for playing Gorgo.
| 7 | 7 | "Halloween with the Addams Family" | Sidney Lanfield | Keith Fowler & Phil Leslie | October 30, 1964 |
Mistaking two robbers named Claude (Don Rickles) and Marty (Skip Homeier) for trick-or-treaters, the family takes them in for a Halloween celebration. The robbers agree because they are hiding out from the police and their car has run out of gas. They put up with the creepy household's holiday festivities as best they can, because they spot Gomez' desk full of ready cash. Unbeknownst to all, Thing is on to them and ready to take matters in hand. When they finally manage to escape the house, it's only into the waiting arms of the police. George Barrows appears as a Policeman.
| 8 | 8 | "Green-Eyed Gomez" | Jerry Hopper | Keith Fowler & Phil Leslie | November 6, 1964 |
When Morticia’s childhood friend Lionel Barker (Del Moore) visits, Gomez views him as an old beau and current rival. Lionel is really there because he knows they have a lot of money. He intends to sell them some phony oil stock. Fearing Lionel and Morticia might run off together, Gomez hires an awkward, man-crazy maid named Mildred (Pattie Chapman) to pull Lionel from Morticia. When Morticia catches Gomez giving Mildred love lessons, she thinks her marriage is on the rocks. Lionel finds out that Mildred is into stocks. Gomez and Morticia come to realize that neither are in love with someone else. Lionel and Mildred get married.
| 9 | 9 | "The New Neighbors Meet the Addams Family" | Jean Yarbrough | Hannibal Coons & Harry Winkler | November 13, 1964 |
Newlyweds Hubert and Amanda (Cynthia Pepper) Peterson move into their new home. But when they find themselves right next door to the frightening Addams estate, they straightaway want out of their one-year lease. Unfortunately for them, the owner is none other than Gomez Addams. Morticia and Gomez invite the Peterson's over to play bridge. It's not long before they are scared away. Hubert makes up a story that they can't stay in the house because his company is sending him to Hong Kong. Gomez solves their problem by buying the company. They must now grin and bear it for as long as it takes to be released (if ever).: Romance: Morticia speaks French ("au contraire") and Gomez does not react — nor did he react in any episode prior. However, this is the first episode in which Gomez says of Morticia "It drives me wild", in reaction to her bullfrog imitation, and starts to embrace her.
| 10 | 10 | "Wednesday Leaves Home" | Sidney Lanfield | Hannibal Coons & Harry Winkler | November 20, 1964 |
Wednesday is punished for using Uncle Fester's explosives and is forbidden to play with her pet spider Homer. She decides to run away from home but goes only as far as hiding in Pugsley's bedroom so she can watch the outcome. Not knowing this, Morticia phones the police to report her missing but afterwards discovers where Wednesday really is. Sgt. Haley (Jesse White), a detective from the missing persons bureau, comes by the house. He is not thrilled when he is told Wednesday has been home the whole time. Morticia and Gomez decide to apply psychology to teach the girl a lesson, but it only makes Wednesday run away for real, soon winding up at police headquarters. Sgt. Haley calls the Addams and asks if Wednesday is home. When Morticia insists she is, Haley decides to come by the house again to check on things. He tells them that Wednesday is at the police station, not knowing that Uncle Fester had picked her up. After he sees Wednesday home, an overworked Sgt. Haley decides to leave the force.: Note: Wednesday's middle name is "Friday". Lisa Loring had lost her front teeth as children do and Morticia mentions it in the opening scene. There are several closeup shots of Wednesday showing that her teeth are missing.
| 11 | 11 | "The Addams Family Meets the VIPs" | Sidney Lanfield | Keith Fowler & Phil Leslie | November 27, 1964 |
Gomez feels as though he's in a rut, doing the same things all the time. Displeased with the preplanned tour devised by Mr. Sam Harris (Frank Wilcox), two suspicious Soviet dignitaries, Ila Klarpe (Stanley Adams) and Miri Haan (Vito Scotti) want to meet a normal American family. That normal family happens to be the Addams. There, they take note of all the astonishing things they see. Mr. Harris keeps trying to tell Ila and Miri that this is not a typical family. In the end, with their view of America radically altered, they decide it's much smarter to remain friendly with such an advanced nation than not.: Family mentioned: Fester's Cousin Creep who was lost to a ray gun.; Romance: This is the first episode in which Gomez reacts specifically to Morticia's use of French, "Tish, when you speak French you drive me wild!", kissing her arm.; Note: The cigar store Indian is made of metal. The piranhas are named Tristan and Isolda. Stanley Adams also guest starred in a classic Star Trek episode selling Tribbles.
| 12 | 12 | "Morticia the Matchmaker" | Jerry Hopper | Story by: Maury Geraghty; Teleplay by: Hannibal Coons & Harry Winkler | December 4, 1964 |
Cousin Melancholia (Hazel Shermet) visits. Abandoned by her fiancé Fred (Hal Baylor), she needs a man. Meanwhile, the firm of Ferguson-Riche and Fisher send Mr. Harvey to broker a deal with Gomez since he's the only one who's dealt with him before. When the Addamses remember the lawyer is a bachelor, they're very eager to have him come by. Morticia dresses up Melancholia to look just like her. While Mr. Harvey keeps trying to talk business, Gomez and Morticia keep playing matchmaker. Fred shows up to reclaim Melancholia. Barry Kelley appears as James Ferguson.: Family mentioned: Cousin Gripe (who used the "Hasty Marriage" marriage broker), Uncle Crimp (whose sweater has one arm longer than the other). Morticia mentions that she has "lots" of female cousins in addition to Melancholia.
| 13 | 13 | "Lurch Learns to Dance" | Sidney Lanfield | Story by: Jay Dratler; Teleplay by: Jay Dratler, Charles Marion & Jerry Seelen | December 11, 1964 |
Lurch receives his annual invitation to The Butlers' Ball, which he ignores as usual because he can't dance. Morticia is determined he accept this year's invitation to avoid the reclusive direction in which he's headed. A dance teacher is hired, but due to her frequent fainting spells and then Lurch fainting, it doesn't work out. Wednesday teaches Lurch ballet. When Morticia tries to teach him the Twist, Lurch throws his back out. Gomez tries to teach him the Tango, but Gomez throws his back out. At the dance Lurch sits by himself until a disguised Morticia brings him out of his shell.: Note: Slapstick comedy of Lurch learning to dance. The teacher sent by the Fred Walters Dance Studio faints upon seeing Lurch, and then again upon seeing Pugsley's horned toad, and then when she sees Thing. The scene of Wednesday and Lurch performing ballet is unforgettable.; Family mentioned: Lurch's father (who wanted him to be a jockey), Uncle Droop (who was very particular about where he wanted his ashes placed) and Aunt Drip in a portrait painting (normal looking). Cousin Blob who was afraid of ghosts — until he became one himself. Grandma Squint who can be heard on dark, stormy nights from the attic cackling.
| 14 | 14 | "Art and the Addams Family" | Sidney Lanfield | Hannibal Coons & Harry Winkler | December 18, 1964 |
When art critic Bosley Swain (Hugh Sanders) recommends that Grandmama get a teacher to help her paint better, Gomez gladly hires none other than Picasso for Mama. Not Pablo Picasso, Sam Picasso (Vito Scotti), a penniless non-talent from Spain. Despite Bosley saying Sam's paintings are bad, Gomez believes Sam is an undiscovered master. Gomez doesn't want Sam to waste his talent. Sam soon finds himself locked in the Addams' basement until he starts cranking out masterpieces. While Sam sneaks out of the basement in one of Pugsley's tunnels, Wednesday does some painting. After catching Sam, Gomez and Morticia believe that Wednesday's paintings are his. Bosley comes by, loves the paintings and buys all of them.: Family mentioned: Fester makes an urn for his Grandfather Malaplop — who is not dead yet.; Notes: Vito Scotti and Hugh Sanders appear for the first time as artist and art critic, respectively.; Cartoon reference: Morticia with Lurch carrying a suitcase, shows a guest to his room. The caption reads: "This is your room. If you should need anything, just scream".
| 15 | 15 | "The Addams Family Meets a Beatnik" | Sidney Lanfield | Story by: Jack Raymond; Teleplay by: Sloan Nibley & Henry Sharp | January 1, 1965 |
The Addams family take care of an injured motorcyclist named Rockland "Rocky" Cartwright III (Tom Lowell). The family is captivated by Rocky and his beatnik way of speaking. He, on the other hand, is trying to get a part for his bike so he can leave. After his bike is fixed, he is about to leave when he sees his domineering tycoon father (Barry Kelley) coming to the house. The children tell the father that they haven't seen Rocky. Gomez and Morticia find out it's Rocky's birthday and decide to have a surprise party for him. They call Rocky's father and invite him. At the party, the father insists that Rocky leave this "house full of kooks". Rocky tells his dad that the family are his friends and they have accepted him as he is. The father realizes his was wrong to try and mold his son into something he wasn't and the two make up.
| 16 | 16 | "The Addams Family Meets the Undercover Man" | Arthur Lubin | Harry Winkler & Hannibal Coons | January 8, 1965 |
The feds get interested in the Addams Family due to Pugsley's ham radio, powered by Uncle Fester, sending out mysterious "coded" messages worldwide. Agent Hollister (George N. Neise) recruits local tradespeople to infiltrate the house like the postman Mr. Briggs (Rolfe Sedan) and the plumber Mr. Conkey (Norman Leavitt). The Addamses become aware that something's not right and call in the feds. Hollister is sent in and he tells Gomez and Morticia it was he that had Briggs and Conkey placed there. Thinking Hollister is part of the ring, they have him detained. While being held, he finds out it was Pugsley sending out the messages.: Family mentioned: Gomez shoots a bullet-hole silhouette of Uncle Flub, who has a "fine, sensitive drooping chin", is prone to tremble, and cannot write; the fact that Morticia is aware of this last fact and Gomez is not, implies Flub is Morticia's uncle.; Note: The Addams are seen smoking from a hookah.
| 17 | 17 | "Mother Lurch Visits the Addams Family" | Sidney Lanfield | Jameson Brewer | January 15, 1965 |
Lurch learns that his mother (Ellen Corby) is coming to visit. Lurch admits to Gomez and Morticia that he told his mother that he owns the Addams house. Morticia suggests that Lurch act like the man of the house, and Gomez and Morticia will act as his servants. Once Lurch's mother arrives, Gomez and Morticia sense their mistake. While Lurch takes only too well to the concept of being head of household, the old woman treats Gomez and Morticia poorly. She even goes so far as to have Lurch fire them. When Mother Lurch mistakes Fester and Grandmama as the new servants, she decides that she can leave now. It might take a bit of time to get Lurch to realize that he is the butler again.: Family mentioned: Morticia's Cousin Slimy (who has two heads), Gomez's Cousin Manuel (who was a pyromaniac), Cousin Imar (three arms and went to Princeton University; previously mentioned in "The Addams Family Goes to School").; Romance: This is the first episode in which Morticia "drives me wild" becomes a regular gag with Gomez kissing Morticia's arm, as some permutation of the shtick appears four times in the episode.; Note: Gomez claims he was born with a mustache. Fester appears to be eating a nopal.
| 18 | 18 | "Uncle Fester's Illness" | Sidney Lanfield | Bill Lutz | January 22, 1965 |
Lately, Uncle Fester's been a bit rundown, literally unable to maintain his wattage. Fester may potentially spoil an upcoming family outing. To handle the situation, the Addams call up the reliable family witch doctor Dr. Mbogo by making contact with a hunter (Loyal "Doc" Lucas) who lives near the native village that Dr. Mbogo is in. When Dr. Mbogo is too busy to leave Africa making him unable to make a housecall, Gomez makes a comment that he should've engaged "that pygmy witch doctor" when he had the chance. The Addamses take their chances by engaging the services of a local physician named Dr. Milford (Lauren Gilbert), who pays them a house call. Dr. Milford is startled by the Addamses home, but tries to examine Fester anyway. After eating one of the Doctor's thermometers, Fester appears to be cured. Now the family can go on their outing.: Romance: Contains the first full development of the French shtick which occurs with regularity in the series: "Tish! When you speak French you drive me wild! Speak some more French, Tish! Anything! Tout à l'heure. La plume de ma tante. Mademoiselle from Armentieres! Anything!"
| 19 | 19 | "The Addams Family Splurges" | Sidney Lanfield | Story by: George Haight; Teleplay by: George Haight & Lou Huston | January 29, 1965 |
Having gone everywhere else on their vacations, the Addams family plan a vacation to the Moon. They will need to raise a billion dollars. The family propose to their broker Ralph J. Hulen (Roland Winters), a plan to raise money by betting on eight champion racehorses. To pick the winners they will use Whizzo, a computer built by Gomez and Pugsley. Mr. Hulen laughs off this plan and believes he's doing Gomez a favor by not placing the initial bet. But when the horses start winning in succession, Mr. Hulen must go and tell the family that he didn't place the bets. Hulen dodges a bullet when the horse in the last race doesn't win.: Olan Soule appears as Harwood Widdy, Hulen's assistant.; Family mentioned: Cousin Nanook, who sent a totem pole to the Addams family for Christmas and wanted their bear in return; Fester called him an "Eskimo giver".
| 20 | 20 | "Cousin Itt Visits the Addams Family" | Sidney Lanfield | Story by: Tony Wilson; Teleplay by: Henry Sharp | February 5, 1965 |
Parks Commissioner Fiske (Alan Reed) visits the Addams house seeking contributions for expansion of the city zoo. Gomez believes visiting Cousin Itt (Felix Silla) - all hairy and gibbering four feet tall of him - would be perfect as the zoo's new curator. Gomez has the two meet, but Commissioner Fiske misunderstands the intent and mistakes Itt for a new exotic animal attraction. Fiske hauls away Itt in chains when the others aren't looking. Itt manages to escape from the zoo. He tells the family he liked being in the cage, but just came back to get some hair brushes.: Note: The radio announcer states the Addams Family's house is in the Greenbriar, Woodlawn area on North Cemetery Drive.
| 21 | 21 | "The Addams Family in Court" | Nat Perrin | Harry Winkler & Hannibal Coons | February 12, 1965 |
While Gomez and Morticia were away bat hunting, Grandmama resumed her old bad habit of fortune telling. She is discovered by undercover police officer Lt. Poston (James Flavin) which snags her an arrest on a municipal code violation. In her hour of need, the family rallies to her side as none other than Gomez "Loophole" Addams - who's never lost a case (nor won one either) - dusts off his law degree to defend her in court. Soon the whole family is being held in contempt of court by Judge Harvey Saunders (Hal Smith). Grandmama is saved from jail by one of her clients who she predicted would get in trouble with the police for that woman happens to be Judge Saunders' wife (Lela Bliss).: Family mentioned: Mamoud Kali Pashka Addams, the "Firebug of the Bosporus" who was previously mentioned in "The Addams Family Tree". Morticia's Cousin Cringe who ate the hacksaw in the cake that was made for him and later developed a taste for them.; Note: The front gate is named "Gate". Morticia is shown to be able to ignite candles with just a touch. Grandmama tells fortunes using a crystal ball that is said to come from a chandelier. At the end of the episode, Morticia demonstrates the same ability.
| 22 | 22 | "Amnesia in the Addams Family" | Sidney Lanfield | Phil Leslie & Keith Fowler | February 19, 1965 |
An accident with his new set of old Indian clubs gives Gomez amnesia and a complete shift in personality. It, unfortunately, coincides with the new million dollar double indemnity insurance policy he's just drawn up to benefit Morticia. This causes Gomez, aghast at his macabre home and family, to think his life's in jeopardy. A second blow on the head might return him to normal. Unfortunately for Gomez there are plenty of clubs with just as many loving family members skulking about, hoping to restore his sanity.: Family mentioned: Grandpa Squint (Morticia reads from his medical book; he was previously mentioned in "Fester's Punctured Romance" and "Gomez the Politician").
| 23 | 23 | "Thing Is Missing" | Sidney Lanfield | Story by: Lorraine Edwards; Teleplay by: Bill Lutz | March 5, 1965 |
Thing has been acting temperamental lately and gets insulted by the slightest little comment. He pouts and then disappears. The family believes he's been "thing-napped." Gomez pretends he's a detective and quickly interviews the family, but gets nowhere. The family receives a ransom note for Thing and they hire detective Sam Diamond (Tommy Farrell) to follow the instructions. After making contact with Thing, the frightened detective comes back and returns his fee. Thing returns and lets the family know that he was feeling neglected and wanted to see if the family cared enough about him to pay the ransom. Charles Wagenheim appears as Mr. Boswell.: Note: Their address is shown as "0001 Cemetery Lane". Thing's full name is "Thing T. Thing" and the T stands for Thing.; Cartoon reference: In an Addams cartoon, Wednesday cuts a chain of paper dolls and the middle one oddly has three legs. There is no caption. Morticia cuts a chain of paper dolls in this episode and the middle one has three legs.
| 24 | 24 | "Crisis in the Addams Family" | Sidney Lanfield | Story by: Preston Wood; Teleplay by: Sloan Nibley & Preston Wood | March 12, 1965 |
Once again, Fester's cannon has wrecked the plumbing. The Henson Insurance Agency is outraged by yet another in a series of payouts on the Addams policy. However, a clause in the small print enables them to finally cancel it. Fester's allowance is subsequently suspended, so he decides to get a job. He scares the insurance man at Henson Insurance into giving him a salesman job. Fester becomes depressed when he cannot sell a policy to anyone. Gomez tries to teach Fester how to make a sale and winds up buying a policy from him. That has the head of the company storming his way to the Addams house to wheedle out of it. It turns out Gomez has a controlling interest in the company.: Guest stars: Parley Baer and Eddie Quillan make their first appearance together on the show as bumbling insurance bureaucrats Arthur J. Henson and Horace Beesley.; Family mentioned: Admiral John Paul Addams, who fought in a sea battle against Hideki Tojo's forces and the German Flotilla, fired the shot heard round the world, and his inspiring words before the battle were "If you need me, I'll be in my cabin". It was mentioned that he was hanged 200 years ago.; Note #1: The gag where the cannon shot sinks the ship in the painting is similar to one in W. C. Fields's International Hotel.; Note #2: Uncle Fester demonstrates "magnetic" powers when applying for the insurance job. Fester has a bed of nails, a concert harp and a table lamp that appears to be made from an armadillo in his bedroom.
| 25 | 25 | "Lurch and His Harpsichord" | Sidney Lanfield | Harry Winkler & Hannibal Coons | March 19, 1965 |
A museum owner named Mr. Belmont (Byron Foulger) takes an interest in Lurch's Krupnik harpsichord, so Morticia and Gomez plan to donate it to the museum. They don't stop till later to think how this might affect Lurch. Lurch is devastated. The family tries to interest him in other pastimes, but to no avail. Gomez and Fester finally decide they must build him a duplicate harpsichord. Once built, the family tell Lurch that they changed their minds and decided not to give the harpsichord away. Two delivery men arrive a day early, while Lurch is home alone, to take the harpsichord away. Lurch now feels betrayed, but lets the men take the harpsichord. It turns out Mr. Belmont was a crook and tried to sell the harpsichord to the museum. When the museum realized the harpsichord was a fake, they have Belmont arrested. Lurch gets his original harpsichord back.: Note: Gomez remarks that the harpsichord's measurements are exactly as Morticia's: 36-21-36. Established actors Leonard (credited as Lennie) Bremen and Ray Galvin appear as a couple of bumbling moving men who are fearful of Lurch. Lurch gets a drum kit as a replacement for the harpsichord and shows that he knows his way around it, but doesn't really play anything. Gomez and Fester get themselves tangled together in a jointed ruler, an old vaudeville routine.; Family mentioned: Aunt Trivia who wasn't a music lover but liked to go around kissing harpsichords. The family's harpsichord was in Cousin Crimp's family for 400 years where Cousin Crimp (not to be confused with Uncle Crimp who was previously mentioned in "Morticia the Matchmaker") used to write four-handed compositions for the harpsichord and play them by himself. Commodore Addams, who led his men into battle off his sinking ship.
| 26 | 26 | "Morticia, the Breadwinner" | Sidney Lanfield | Phil Leslie | March 26, 1965 |
A newspaper story about a stock market tumble panics Fester and Morticia. They overhear Gomez on the phone with his broker. Hearing the words "broke, penniless and wiped out", they believe Gomez is financially ruined. He's actually trying to buy his own railroad as a surprise to Morticia. Morticia rallies the rest of the family to figure out ways to earn money and help Gomez. Grandmama prepares to be a beauty stylist, Fester forms an escort service with Lurch, the children sell drinks at a sidewalk stand (henbane), while Morticia offers fencing and tango lessons. None of these amount to much. Morticia discovers she holds shares in the railroad and tries to sell them to raise money for the family. She gets into a bidding war, unaware that Gomez is the buyer.: Guest-starring: Milton Frome as Mr. Blooker. Actors John "Red" Fox, Maxine Semon and Ceil Cabot also appear.; In-joke: When Fester and Morticia are trying to decide on a fake name, Morticia suggests "Jones".; Family mentioned: Aunt Phobia, in whose sleeping bag Gomez once hid a nest of hornets; the later episode "Morticia's Romance, Part 1" clarifies that Phobia is Morticia's (or perhaps Fester's) aunt, not Gomez's. Cousin Crimp, whose glass eye Morticia and Fester find in the family safe and was previously mentioned in "Lurch and his Harpsichord". Morticia's Grandpa Droop, who gave her stock certificates for her twelfth birthday.
| 27 | 27 | "The Addams Family and the Spacemen" | Sidney Lanfield | Harry Winkler & Hannibal Coons | April 2, 1965 |
Pugsley's late night missile launches causes fourteen sighting calls to the Bureau of Mysterious Space Objects (M.S.O.) about possible UFOs. The Addamses are about to leave for a combined midnight picnic and snail hunt when they hear an announcement of unknown flying objects in their area. Thinking there might be Martians about, they happily decide to look around and see. Mr. Gilbert and Mr. Hinckley (Tim Herbert), from the M.S.O., converge upon the Addams estate with the same idea. The two parties meet, each deciding that the others are from another world. Gomez and Morticia bring the two men to the house. Gomez calls the M.S.O. and reports that he has captured two Martians. Professor Altshuler (Vito Scotti) arrives, and despite the strange goings on, both parties decide neither are aliens.: Note: The Addams are seen smoking from a hookah.; Family mentioned: Old Senator Addams who was said to be "wise and understanding" before they impeached him. Cousin Galileo who wore a swimsuit. Cousin Grope who has three ears. Old "Blood and Thunder" Addams who was said to be "inspirational" right before he turned traitor at Shiloh in 1862. Old "Cannonball" Addams who was said to be "a natural-born leader" at Bunker Hill in 1775....before he began firing at his own men ("Never could see without his glasses").
| 28 | 28 | "My Son the Chimp" | Sidney Lanfield | Story by: Don Quinn; Teleplay by: Henry Sharp | April 9, 1965 |
Uncle Fester thinks his conjuring mishap has turned Pugsley into a chimpanzee. The family is unaware that Fester's explosion merely knocked Pugsley into a secret room, where he's trapped. The chimpanzee is a real chimpanzee that escaped from an organ grinder and climbed into Pugsley's window. Pugsley befriended the animal outside anyone's notice and the chimpanzee dressed itself in a duplicate set of his clothes. Fester keeps trying but can't seem to turn the chimpanzee back into Pugsley. In the end, Fester accidentally frees Pugsley and gets himself trapped in the secret room.: Family mentioned: Gomez's Great-Aunt Deliria, who was engaged to a chimpanzee (but got jilted).; Note: A picture of Gorgo the Gorilla from "Morticia Joins the Ladies League" appears in Pugsley's bedroom. The chimpanzee is the star of this show and gets as much screen time as any member of the family. Neither the chimpanzee nor his trainer is mentioned in the credits. One might be right to suspect that the chimpanzee was trained by the Weatherwax animal training organization, run by Pugsley's real-life uncle.
| 29 | 29 | "Morticia's Favorite Charity" | Sidney Lanfield | Story by: Elroy Schwartz; Teleplay by: Elroy Schwartz & Jameson Brewer | April 16, 1965 |
Morticia's favorite charitable organization, run by Arthur Henson (Parley Baer), is holding their annual charity bazaar. Morticia persuades her family to part with their most precious (and, of course, bizarre) items in order to donate them to the charity auction. But the giving goes too far when Gomez hands over Pugsley's beloved wolf's-head clock without first asking. The boy sulks up the chimney, threatening never to come down, so Gomez and Morticia independently head back to the bazaar to get his clock back. Gomez and Morticia wind up bidding against each other. When the price starts to climb, a Mr. Clayton (Donald Foster) bids as well and wins the clock. Lurch manages to get the clock back for Pugsley.: Note: The moose head with the awry antler is named Pierre; his hind end is a clock.; Family mentioned: Gomez's Cousin Slosh who went down the city sewer in a "fit of pique", completely disowned the family, and "made a whole new life for himself". A variation of him appeared in the 1991 film where he had a toad-like appearance.
| 30 | 30 | "Progress and the Addams Family" | Sidney Lanfield | Story by: Cecil Beard & Clark Haas; Teleplay by: Bill Freedman & Ben Gershman | April 23, 1965 |
The city is planning to put a freeway through the Addams' neighborhood. In fact, the Addams' house is slated for demolition. Gomez and Morticia must find a solution, or else the house will be destroyed. Arthur J. Henson, city commissioner, visits to underscore the point that the Addams must move out. Unwilling to leave their precious home, Gomez and Morticia arrive at the idea to have the house moved to another location. Gomez buys the vacant lot next to Arthur Henson's home, and he pays to have their house moved there. Henson convinces the city council to reroute the highway so the house won't have to be moved.: Note: Parley Baer once again guest-stars as Arthur Henson. Natalie Masters plays his wife, Phoebe. John Hart and Richard Reeves (billed as Dick Reeves) are the demolition men assigned to blow up the house. Gomez is seen lighting a cigar with an old-fashioned blowtorch. City Commissioner Arthur Henson says "Thank you" to Thing when Thing returns his hat.; Family mentioned: Cousin Plato who has two heads as Morticia makes him a knitted hat; Gomez reminds Morticia that Plato (whom he describes as a "lad") has a left head that is size six and a right head that is size 8 3/4, implying that Plato is Gomez's cousin. Lord Chief Justice Sir Anthony Cliveden-Addams and his wife Lady Abigail Cliveden-Addams (who worked as barristers with Gomez mistaking the latter's barrister wig for the former's barrister wig).
| 31 | 31 | "Uncle Fester's Toupee" | Sidney Lanfield | Harry Winkler & Hannibal Coons | April 30, 1965 |
Uncle Fester confesses that he's exaggerated himself to his Illinois pen pal Madelyn Cavendish Beauregard Faversham Firestone Smith (Elisabeth Fraser) after she writes that she will visit. Mostly he is concerned that he has no hair, and he said that he was an athlete. Morticia and Gomez have Mr. Max come by with some hairpieces for Uncle Fester. When Madelyn drops by unexpectedly, he must assume his false appearance and personality. But when Morticia learns that Madelyn has had five husbands, all now dead, she begins to worry for Uncle Fester's future happiness. After Morticia tells Madelyn all of Festers favorite things, she runs off.: Notes: Established actor Frederic Downs plays the toupee salesman who makes a house call. Gomez and Morticia bowl in the living room, without a bowling alley, and both perform feats that might be called supernatural. Morticia implies that Fester's pen-pal Madelyn (who has had five husbands) is nothing more than a gold-digger. Fester puts a large "Y" in the front of his coat, and has Lurch bring out a tackling dummy with a large "H" on its jersey.; Family mentioned: Cousin Droop (not to be confused with either Morticia's Grandpa Droop who was previously mentioned in "Morticia, the Breadwinner" or Gomez's Uncle Droop who was previously mentioned in "Lurch Learns to Dance"; he dropped the mirror that Gomez modeled toupees for Uncle Fester, for luck), Cousin Bleak (previously mentioned in "The Addams Family Tree"; the toupee tried on reminded Gomez about the time when a bunch of boll weevils got into his hair), General Ulysses S. Addams (who surrendered at the 1863 Vicksburg when the enemy soldiers caught up with him), Cousin Squint (not to be confused with Grandpa Squint who was mentioned in "Fester's Punctured Romance", "Gomez the Politician", and "Amnesia in the Addams Family" or Grandma Squint who was mentioned in "Lurch Learns to Dance"), whose leg in the swordfish is all they could save of him (although in "The Addams Family Tree", the leg's former owner was identified as "Cousin Farouk").
| 32 | 32 | "Cousin Itt and the Vocational Counselor" | Sidney Lanfield | Harry Winkler & Hannibal Coons | May 7, 1965 |
Morticia thinks marriage counseling would be the perfect career choice for Cousin Itt. To prove it to him, she and Gomez pretend to be a couple in trouble. But things go awry when she starts believing in parts of Gomez's fanciful play-acting. Now Morticia and Gomez really are a couple in trouble, and Itt won't do as a marriage counselor at all. Morticia and Gomez call professional vocation advisor Mortimer Phelps (Richard Deacon) to find Cousin Itt a job. Phelps evaluates Itt and decides he should be a marriage counselor.: Notes: Lurch goes to Cousin Itt's room, where he can't stand up, and speaks Cousin Itt's language. Later, the vocational counselor discovers he can understand and speak to Itt, too. Gomez looks very much like Groucho Marx in Duck Soup when he wears an old-fashioned nightgown and a nightcap with a tassel.; Family mentioned: Cornelius Addams whose cup of tea was failure; Gomez's Cousin Trivia (not to be confused with Aunt Trivia from "Lurch and his Harpsichord") who found a job after she got out of the WACs...wax museum.
| 33 | 33 | "Lurch the Teenage Idol" | Sidney Lanfield | Story by: Carol Henning, Mitch Persons & Ed Ring; Teleplay by: Phil Leslie | May 14, 1965 |
Low grunts and grumbles while at the harpsichord constitute Lurch's manner of singing. Lurch's musical talent earns him a record deal and legions of teenage fans. All that blind adoration goes to Lurch's head, and the Addames quickly find they have a self-centered butler who won't "buttle" any longer. When told that he will be going on a "world tour", Lurch loses his voice. After regaining his voice, Lurch decides to stay home when he is mobbed by fans.: Notes: Wednesday performs the Watusi and Gomez demonstrates the Freddie to Lurch's recording. Mizzy Bickle (played by Herkie Styles; coincidentally the name "Mizzy" is the same as the last name of the theme song's composer) owns the record company and Gladys (Laurie Mitchell) is his assistant. Susie (Noanna (a.k.a. Joanna) Dix) and Claire (Pamela (Pam) McMyler) are two of Lurch's fans.
| 34 | 34 | "Winning of Morticia Addams" | Sidney Lanfield | Story by: Charles Marion; Teleplay by: Charles Marion & Jameson Brewer | May 21, 1965 |
A magazine article by eminent psychologist Dr. Francois Chalon has Uncle Fester believing Gomez's and Morticia's marriage is doomed to fail because they are too compatible. Fester makes it his duty, for family peace and harmony, to get them fighting so they can let off emotional steam and become a truly happy couple. He recruits others in the family to help but winds up with little to show for it. Finally, Fester calls in Dr. Chalon himself. However, the eminent doctor proves to be a modern-day Casanova when he starts to woo Morticia. Gomez challenges Dr. Chalon to a duel for her hand. Chalon is more than happy to oblige as he is a great swordsman. But when Chalon realizes that Morticia will never go away with him, he leaves.: Guest stars: French psychiatrist François Chalon, the author of the article (played by Lee Bergere), poses as a friend of Fester's in an attempt to create conflict. Character actor Jan Arvan plays the leader of Gomez's "zen yogi [sic]" society, Drashi Dumo.; Notes: Lurch decides not to try to remove Drashi Dumo's turban when he visits, typically groaning and shaking his head.

=== Season 2 (1965–66) ===
In the second season, a fireman's pole appears in the living room and is used at various times by Uncle Fester, Grandmama and the children. Fester goes both up and down it as does Gomez.

Also in the second season, Gomez is shown more often standing on his head. Sometimes this was faked and he hung from a trapeze for long scenes, and at other times it is clever cuts using a stuntman. John Astin is vague about whether he can do it himself.

| No. overall | No. in season | Title | Directed by | Written by | Original release date |
|---|---|---|---|---|---|
| 35 | 1 | "My Fair Cousin Itt" | Sidney Lanfield | Phil Leslie | September 17, 1965 |
Gomez has written a play for Wednesday's upcoming birthday. The play is called Claude & Mable (which comes out quite exactly like William Shakespeare's Romeo and Juliet). To make sure his play is a big success, Gomez hires acclaimed Broadway director Eric Von Bissell to direct it. Von Bissel's career has been on the skids of late, so Gomez' money is quite appealing even though the rest of the project isn't. Itt, Fester, and Lurch all vie for the lead in the play. Von Bissell's artistic reputation is threatened when he learns that Cousin Itt, with his gibber talk, will play the lead. Morticia takes Itt aside to work on lowering and slowing his voice for the average ear, but when she succeeds she finds Itt's personality has changed along with his voice. Now he's a theatrical snob of the worst sort and too good for the lead in Wednesday's birthday play.: Douglas Evans appears as Producer Sam Derrick.; Hamlet and The Merchant of Venice are also the subject of jokes. Expatriate German Sig Ruman, a Marx Bros. favorite, appears at age 79 as Director Erich von Bissell in one of his last television roles.; Note: Lurch's line, "Lady Chatterley, I love you" was both daring and funny on prime-time TV in the 1960s. Cousin Itt learns to speak in a resonant low-pitched voice.
| 36 | 2 | "Morticia's Romance: Part 1" | Sidney Lanfield | Harry Winkler & Hannibal Coons | September 24, 1965 |
It's midnight on the 13th wedding anniversary of Gomez and Morticia. The whole family is up in celebration, and the happy couple are obliged to tell the story of how they first met. How Grandmama and Granny Frump converged to pair up Gomez with - not Morticia but Morticia's older sister Ophelia. The sickly Gomez takes an almost immediate disinterest in Ophelia. But, he is smitten when he first sees Morticia. Gomez must find a way out of his engagement to Ophelia. Margaret Hamilton guest-stars as the mother of Ophelia and Morticia.: Family mentioned: Gomez's Aunt Trivia (last mentioned in "Lurch and His Harpsichord") who Gomez (in the flashback sequence) claims sent them a dozen broken cup handles; Gomez refers to her as "our" aunt, implying that she might be Grandmama's aunt and thus Gomez's great-aunt.; Notes: Ophelia Frump is a blonde who wears flowers in her hair, carries a bouquet and dances around. Later, in "Ophelia Visits Morticia" it is learned that the flowers are growing out of her head and have to be weeded. Morticia Frump is a grown-up Wednesday with the same hair and clothing, and a headless Marie Antoinette doll. It is obvious which sister Gomez prefers from the beginning, but the mothers have other ideas. Morticia's carnivorous plant, Cleopatra, is small enough to be carried around in a box. Kitty is her pet cat. Lurch is identical to his later self, as are Grandmama and Thing.; Family history: The episode marks Gomez and Morticia's thirteenth wedding anniversary, meaning that they married in 1952. Gomez states that Thing, one of the family servants, has been his companion since childhood; the episode "Thing Is Missing" depicted a photograph of Thing's parents, and thus Thing might have inherited his role as a servant from them (in some wealthy families, it is not uncommon for children to befriend the children of servants). Fester is shown to be Morticia and Ophelia's uncle; since in an earlier episode, Fester seemed not to know his own surname, perhaps meaning that he (and, by implication, his sister Hester, aka Granny Frump) has none, this indicates that he is Morticia and Ophelia's maternal uncle, since their father's surname, Frump, is clearly stated more than once during the series. In contrast, Cousin Itt is shown to have lived in the Addams home prior to Gomez and Morticia's marriage, confirming that he is Gomez's cousin, not Morticia's. Gomez and Morticia are both 22 years old when they marry, indicating that both were born in 1930. First appearance of Ophelia (played by Carolyn Jones), which predates Samantha/Serena (Elizabeth Montgomery) of Bewitched by three months.
| 37 | 3 | "Morticia's Romance: Part 2" | Sidney Lanfield | Harry Winkler & Hannibal Coons | October 1, 1965 |
A nice, violent thunderstorm puts the children in the mood to hear the rest of the story on how their parents met and married. The mothers finish quibbling over the dowry. Gomez is afraid to openly tell Ophelia he doesn't care for her (and likely get judo-tossed around the room for it). Morticia's Uncle Fester arrives to help out. He tries to get Ophelia interested in Cousin Itt. Gomez goes into hiding. Fester and Morticia try to help the cowardly Gomez pluck up enough courage to confront Ophelia. At the ceremony, both Gomez and Ophelia admit they care for someone else. Gomez and Morticia get married and Ophelia runs off with Cousin Itt.: Family mentioned: Morticia's, or perhaps Fester's, Aunt Phobia (who had two right feet; last mentioned in "Morticia, the Breadwinner") who married Uncle Tic (who had two left feet); Fester, at least, believes the marriage to have been a mistake. Another reference to Aunt Trivia (Grandmama mentions her funeral). Gomez's Cousin Fungus (who lived in the cave at the back of the Addams Mansion's tunnels for 30 years).; Cartoon reference: In an original Addams cartoon, Wednesday cuts a chain of paper dolls and one oddly has three legs. No caption. The young Morticia does the same. Gomez: "How do you do that?" Morticia: "I don't know; it always comes out that way".; Notes: In one of the framing scenes, Gomez plays a Gottlieb "Dancing Dolls" pinball machine. Interestingly, the Addams Family pinball machine is the best-selling pinball of all time. Uncle Fester is said to have "shot the arrow" (and he says, "the gun") that brought Morticia's mother and father together. Uncle Fester has a moment where he breaks the fourth wall. There is some sexually suggestive dialog ("He won't know what he's getting into") and mildly risqué actions concerning Cousin Itt and Ophelia, who discover an instant mutual attraction. There are references to Shakespeare again: Gomez quotes a line from Hamlet when thinking about Ophelia. Actor Edward Schaaf plays the minister who performs the marriage ceremony.
| 38 | 4 | "Morticia Meets Royalty" | Sidney Lanfield | Leo Rifkin | October 8, 1965 |
Pretentious Aunt Millicent (Gomez's aunt from Marshy Bottom, Iowa, played by Elvia Allman) visits the family with her handmaiden Lady Fingers, with whom Thing falls in love. Aunt Millie married a prince (who was also a pauper, says Morticia) and still considers herself a princess. Everyone bends over backwards to accommodate her high and mightiness, but she's a royal pain. Finally, after finding a sign tacked to her bedroom door reading "Princess, go home", she leaves. Everyone's glad except for Thing, who pines from the absence of Lady Fingers. For his sake alone, the family invites the princess back, but they find out that Lady Fingers is no longer in Millicent's employ. When everyone finds out that Millicent's new handmaiden, Esmerelda, is a thief, Lady Fingers returns. Thing gives Lady Fingers an engagement ring.: Notes: Princess Millicent arrives in a sedan chair which is obviously a prop as it is never lifted by her two uncredited lackeys. This episode contains several clever examples of wordplay about hands (Thing's and Lady Fingers's) and also Gomez's line "See? Even the pages have turned over a new leaf" referring to Wednesday and Pugsley who were dressed in medieval costumes.
| 39 | 5 | "Gomez, the People's Choice" | Sidney Lanfield | Story by: Joseph Vogel & Marvin Kaplan; Teleplay by: Henry Sharp | October 15, 1965 |
The house tax arrives and the Addamses are appalled that the figure attached to their fine, elegant mansion should be so low. However, attempts to rectify the matter only lowers the amount even more. It's obvious to them that their city government is corrupt. Morticia thinks Gomez should run against Arthur Henson (Parley Baer) for mayor. Surprisingly, Gomez's outrageous campaign catches on, appearing to the public as brilliant satire. It looks like he'll be a shoo-in as the next mayor. Just when Henson is about to concede, he finds out that the signatures Fester got to put Gomez on the ballot were just names from a cemetery.: Notes: Eddie Quillan plays Henson's assistant again, using the name Clyde Arbogast (which is not mentioned in the show). Familiar face Jack Barry plays a reporter. Character actors Lennie Bremen and Bart "Buzz" Greene play a couple of construction workers.; Family mention: Lafayette Addams who said "The family honor is at stake" before he skipped town before a duel.
| 40 | 6 | "Cousin Itt's Problem" | Sidney Lanfield | Carol Henning, Ed Ring & Mitch Persons | October 22, 1965 |
Cousin Itt returns from the South Seas to a welcome home party, but it soon appears that he's losing his hair. Hoping to help Itt, Uncle Fester orders a new chemistry set to brew up a batch of hair tonic. It's a success, and soon there's hair growing everywhere, on portraits, doorknobs and Thing's box. The tonic even works on Cousin Itt, who now sports a new bristle of hair on his head. After he uses the tonic on himself, Fester becomes a new man, ready to court the ladies with a full new head of blonde wavy locks. Unfortunately, Fester's remedy is only temporary. And it turns out Itt wasn't losing his hair after all, the hair was coming from a dog that was gifted to him.: Notes: Meg Wyllie plays Mrs. Dragwater, a widowed lady who attracts Uncle Fester, who has grown hair and considers himself handsome. Frankie Darro delivers Fester's chemistry set; Darro was 5'3" and Lurch towers over him more than usual. When Mrs. Dragwater is visiting, Morticia summons Lurch using a small gong on a table but the sound of it is the same as the noose bell-pull. Then Morticia requests cocktails and Lurch produces a tray with the drinks on it from behind his back. The finale occurs in Cousin Itt's crowded low-ceilinged room with Marx-brothers-like confusion as everyone looks for the ringing telephone.; Family mention: Gomez's Aunt Anemia is in a portrait painting where it originally depicted her with a beard and moustache after Uncle Fester splashed hair restorer on it.
| 41 | 7 | "Halloween - Addams Style" | Sidney Lanfield | Hannibal Coons & Harry Winkler | October 29, 1965 |
Wednesday is devastated when a neighbor named Mr. Thompson tells her that there are no such things as witches. Morticia and Gomez can't produce immediate proof to the contrary. The family attempts to disprove Mr. Thompson with a seance trying to summon Great-Great-Great Aunt Singe, whom they believe was a genuine witch. They get a quick response via a well-meant deception between Mama and Lurch, but now the family expects a visit from Aunt Singe, a visit that's surely not to happen. Fortunately, a scavenger hunter dressed as a witch comes to the house and the family believes it's Aunt Singe. Wednesday's confidence is restored. When the woman is confronted by Cousin Cackle, she jumps out the window.: Family mention: Morticia's Great-Great-Great Aunt Singe, who was burned at Salem, is described as a witch and whose ashes are in an urn. Clump (Uncle Fester's deceased brother who he claimed was the "quiet one" when they held a seance to talk to him). Cousin Cackle has lived in the caves beneath the mansion for decades, implying that he and Cousin Fungus (mentioned in "Morticia's Romance, Part 1") might be one and the same.; Notes: Cousin Cackle (played by Don McArt) makes an appearance. Movie actress Yvonne Peattie plays "Penelope Sandhurst", who trick-or-treats at the Addams house in a witch costume and is mistaken for a real witch (Aunt Singe). Bob Jellison appears as "Henry Sandhurst", who is on a scavenger hunt with Penelope. Neither of the Sandhurst names are mentioned in the show. The bobbing-for-apples-on-a-seesaw routine is classic slapstick and is rerun at the end of the show. When Gomez summons Lurch to obtain his hat and cane, Lurch has them already in his hands.
| 42 | 8 | "Morticia, the Writer" | Sidney Lanfield | Hannibal Coons & Harry Winkler | November 5, 1965 |
Morticia is appalled when Pugsley and Wednesday come home from school with books about evil witches and slaying dragons. She throws herself into the task of writing proper stories for children, Addams-style of course. Gomez cannot get her affection any more, since she is obsessed with writing. Though it pains him to tamper with obvious masterpieces, he enlists Uncle Fester's aid in sabotaging her stories. But to his horror, Mr. Boswell the publisher says the tampered tales will get published. Gomez believes that Boswell is a con artist, but he actually publishes the book. Morticia sees a copy of the book and thinks Boswell altered it. Gomez confesses that he made the changes. Morticia says it's clear they will only publish bad writing.: Family mention: Cousin Cackle, who made an appearance in "Halloween - Addams Style"; Cousin Turncoat, who is apparently "coming in".; Notes: Peter Bonerz appears as Morticia's publisher. Gomez shows his athletic ability by standing on his head, and by performing trick ping-pong shots. There are now two cigar-store Indian props. The new one was given to Gomez by Morticia, and Morticia tells Gomez, "You always said I was an Indian giver".
| 43 | 9 | "Morticia, the Sculptress" | Sidney Lanfield | Harry Winkler & Hannibal Coons | November 12, 1965 |
When Morticia declares she's needs an outlet for her creativity, Gomez suggests sculpting. Morticia likes the idea and immediately throws herself into it. After months of work, she declares that it's finished, but it still looks like a big shapeless rock. Gomez has art dealer Bosley Swain appraise the masterpiece, but he hates it. Gomez realizes he's right, but he'd do anything to keep Morticia happy. He devises a plan to pay Sam Piccasso (Vito Scotti) to pretend to like it and purchase it, all with Gomez's money. The problem is, Morticia decides to keep the money instead of put it in the Addams family bank account. She works on more statues, which she also sells to Mr. Piccasso, each time for more and more (of Gomez's) money. Gomez is running out of money. But when Wednesday and Pugsley come down from their bedrooms for a midnight snack, things change. Instead of having some cold yak meat left in the refrigerator, they make chocolate fudge. Morticia is horrified that this has occurred because of her lack of supervision, and decides to hang up her chisel for good.: Notes: Hugh Sanders again plays art critic Bosley Swain. He does not like Morticia's sculpture. Morticia quotes Keat's famous line, "A thing of beauty is a joy forever", and attributes it. Gomez's drawer of money ("petty cash") is emptied by his scheme and his bank account is overdrawn.; Family mentioned: Cousin Vague (who Gomez states is "about as abstract as you can get"), Grandmama's Great-Great-Grandmother Slice (who sharpened the guillotine and was "The belle of the French Revolution").
| 44 | 10 | "Gomez, the Reluctant Lover" | Sidney Lanfield | Story by: Charles Marion; Teleplay by: Charles Marion & Leo Rifkin | November 19, 1965 |
Pugsley begins to act strangely and Gomez and Mortica are concerned till he declares he has fallen in love. Discovering one of Gomez's love letters to Morticia, Pugsley rewrites the document and sends it to his true love, his teacher Miss Dunbar (Jill Andre). After complaining to the school principal Mr. Jennings (character actor Thomas Browne Henry, credited as "Tom Brown Henry"), Miss Dunbar visits the Addams family. A misunderstanding by the teacher leads her to think Gomez wrote the letter and she acts on the impulse. Morticia tells Gomez he must let her down easy and build up her ego. But things get even more out of hand. The arrival of Mr. Jennings actually saves the day.: Notes: In the opening scene Morticia is using a dentist's drill on Gomez, who enjoys it, perhaps a nod to The Little Shop of Horrors (1960) and its macabre comedy scene featuring Jack Nicholson at the dentist. Classic literature is mocked again: Morticia: "It is better to have loved and lost, than never to have loved at all". Gomez: "Lincoln?" Morticia: "Jefferson" (Tennyson). Gomez grabs Miss Dunbar (with Morticia's approval) and her glasses fall off and the comb falls out of her hair, letting her hair fall down on her shoulders, revealing her as attractive.
| 45 | 11 | "Feud in the Addams Family" | Sidney Lanfield | Story by: Rick Richards; Teleplay by: Rick Richards & Jerry Gottler | November 26, 1965 |
Prominent socialite Abigail Addams is in a feud with the Gomez Addams branch of the family, and is threatening to sue Gomez. Meanwhile, little Wednesday has met a boy her age, Robespierre Courtney, and wants him to be her boyfriend. The boy's mother, Mrs. Courtney (Virginia Gregg), a social climber who knows nothing of the Abigail-Gomez feud, thinks that Wednesday is Abigail's granddaughter. So she is eager to have tea with the Addams family, expecting to meet Abigail. The Addams family invite Robespierre and his parents over so that Wednesday can play with Robespierre. Before the scheduled tea, each member of the Addams family takes turns coaching Wednesday in how to catch Robespierre's heart. Robespierre and his parents arrive, and after Wednesday's startling greeting the two children go off to play. The Addamses and Courtneys socialize, with the usual disastrous (for the Courtneys) results. Fred Clark appears as Mr. Courtney.: Notes: The tower is Lurch's room. Uncle Fester says "I know a spy when I see one. He has the face of THRUSH!" referring to The Man from U.N.C.L.E which was running on the rival network NBC. The interior of the Courtney house looks remarkably like the Post home from Mr. Ed.; Family mentioned: "Stonewall" Addams who was not afraid, when he flunked his physical. Gomez mentions a family of "Boston one-D Adamses", his distant relations, of which Abigail fancies herself the head.
| 46 | 12 | "Gomez, the Cat Burglar" | Sidney Lanfield | Phil Leslie | December 3, 1965 |
Gomez is having some sleepwalking issues brought on by Grandma's famous yak stew. The house descends into chaos when a connection is made between a recent spate of cat burglaries and Gomez's nighttime adventures. After finding all the stolen property in the store-room, Morticia goes on the search for a cure before Gomez gets caught and branded a criminal. The police show up thinking they saw the cat burglar entering the home. Morticia manages to hypnotize them into returning all the stolen goods to the owners.: Note: Familiar actors Ken Mayer and Bill White, Jr. appear as policemen.; Family reference: Mr. Addams (Gomez's father, presumably Grandmama's husband) who enjoyed yak gravy on "glutton" bread (not gluten the way he ate it).; Cartoon reference: Morticia, in the opening scene, again cuts the paper dolls. They all have one head and two legs except the one in the middle, which has two heads and three legs. In the cartoon, Wednesday cuts a chain of paper dolls and the middle one has three legs.
| 47 | 13 | "Portrait of Gomez" | Sidney Salkow | Story by: Leo Salkin & Bill Lutz; Teleplay by: Leo Salkin, Bill Lutz & Henry Sharp | December 10, 1965 |
The Addams family is puzzled when a photographer from Strife magazine calls but leaves no message. They suspect he wants to photograph Gomez for a "Man Of The Year" piece. Gomez is concerned that there's only been one man in the world who has ever captured his true self in a photograph. Morticia hires a private detective to find that photographer. Apparently the photographer takes drivers license pictures for the DMV now. Gomez doesn't really know how to drive, but goes to take the test anyway. He finds out that his favorite photographer was fired the same day he was hired. Morticia then paints a picture of Gomez for the magazine. The photographer from Strife shows up and explains that they want a picture of the house as they are running a story on haunted houses.: Notes: Uncle Fester walks on stilts across the living room. Gomez has been hanging upside down from the chandelier for three days.; Obtaining a driver's license is mocked. Gomez needs a photo of himself for the magazine and only one photographer will do, and he now takes photos for driver's licenses. Tom D'Andrea takes Gomez on the driving test. Ralph Montgomery plays the magazine photographer.: Roger Arroyo performs Cousin Itt in this episode because Felix Silla was unavailable.
| 48 | 14 | "Morticia's Dilemma" | Sidney Miller | Jerry Gottler & John Bradford | December 17, 1965 |
Gomez plays host to Don Xavier Molina de la Mancha Molinas (Anthony Caruso), a family friend during his childhood in Spain. Don Xavier arrives with his daughter Consuela, who was betrothed to Gomez when he was five years old, and her Dueña (chaperone), character actress Bella Bruck. Because of a misunderstanding, Morticia comes to believe Gomez intends to go through with the marriage and he has other women all around the world. Gomez hires Señor Cardona, a flamenco dancer, to entertain his guests. Consuela falls for Cardona. Don Xavier is initially insulted when he learns Gomez is married to Morticia, but things work out when he finds out Consuela loves the dancer. Carlos Rivas plays the dancer.: Family reference: Gomez's Grandpapa (whether this was Grandpa Squint from "Fester's Punctured Romance", "Gomez the Politician", "Amnesia in the Addams Family" or Grandpa Slurp from "The Addams Family Tree" is unspecified) who signed the marriage contract. Cousin Crimp, previously mentioned in "Lurch and his Harpsichord" and "Morticia, the Breadwinner", whom Gomez mistakes for himself in Morticia's jail painting.; Note: Gomez hops on a pogo stick and rides an old-fashioned tricycle, but his skateboard riding is more or less faked. Don Xavier is momentarily surprised by Thing's existence but quickly adapts, saying that in America servants are cheap. Later, Thing pours him a glass of wine, and he says, "Gracias", adding, "You're very handy".
| 49 | 15 | "Christmas with the Addams Family" | Sidney Lanfield | Hannibal Coons & Harry Winkler | December 24, 1965 |
Mr. Thompson next door tells Wednesday and Pugsley there's no Santa Claus and the family volunteers Uncle Fester to play Santa for their benefit. But when he gets stuck in the chimney and is a no show, every member of the family dresses up as Santa to prove to Wednesday and Pugsley that he's real. However, after a different Santa keeps showing up, the children become suspicious. The children are disappointed that the real Santa didn't show up. But when no one was looking, the real Santa arrives and leaves lots of presents.: Family mentioned: Cousin Caliban whose head sculpture is a gift for Grandmama (implying that Caliban is Gomez's cousin on his mother's side); sculptor did not do the other head. Aunt Singe from "Halloween - Addams Style" is mentioned where it was mentioned by Morticia that there were no witches until she was conjured.; Cartoon references: #1: Morticia decorates a bare Christmas tree, but without caption. #2: The children stoke the fireplace. The caption reads "The little dears, they still believe in Santa Claus".; Note: Morticia sings "Deck the Halls", accompanying herself on the samisen, with Lurch playing harpsichord and Thing providing percussion. Later, the entire cast sings "We Wish You A Merry Christmas". Morticia plays a string bass, Gomez's present to her, to the Addams theme.
| 50 | 16 | "Uncle Fester, Tycoon" | Sidney Salkow | Sloan Nibley & Preston Wood | December 31, 1965 |
Uncle Fester decides to propose to a bearded lady named Diana. Morticia dresses up as Diana's bearded mother to force him into facing how financially ill-prepared he is for the responsibilities of marriage. The trick works, and Fester becomes determined to succeed. He takes a course in becoming a wheeler-dealer and undergoes a personality change. Flushed with confidence, Fester blusters his way into a company headed by Thaddeus Logan. Morticia and Gomez think all Fester's recent business talk is entirely in his head. They call for a psychiatrist who'll be arriving under an assumed identity. When Mr. Logan drops by beforehand, they mistake him for the psychiatrist, leaving poor Mr. Logan to believe Fester is having him on. After meeting Thing, a startled Mr. Logan runs out of the house. The real psychiatrist shows up and thinking he was sent by Logan, Morticia and Gomez thank him for coming out. They tell him Fester is cured and they won't need him.: Notes: Gomez hammers a croquet field into the enormous rug (which appears to be a Bibikabad, but is probably fake) in the living room. Looking in the telephone book, it reads: Cybernetics... Cyclops... Cychiatrists [sic].; Guest stars: Roy Roberts appears as business executive Thaddeus Logan. Harold Peary plays the "Cychiatrist", Dr. Brown, who makes a house call to treat Fester. Both of them flee the Addams house.
| 51 | 17 | "Morticia and Gomez vs. Fester and Grandmama" | Sidney Salkow | Story by: Lila Garrett & Bernie Kahn; Teleplay by: Sloan Nibley & Preston Wood | January 7, 1966 |
Two weeks of unfavorable weather (blue skies and sunshine) keep the Addams clan stuck indoors, where Morticia and Gomez believe Fester and Grandmama spoil the children too much. With Hurricane Zsa-Zsa threatening the Gulf Coast, Gomez and Morticia decide to enjoy it at their favorite watch spot, the dilapidated Last Chance Motel in Florida. They hire Thudd, a Choctaw-fluent governess, to watch the children, which infuriates Fester and Mama over not being considered responsible for the job. Fester and Mama divide the house with a white line until they can afford to move out. When Thudd arrives, she seems tailor-made for the Addams' children. But a mix-up in luggage later reveals she's not the Addams style. Gomez and Morticia race home, hoping they're not too late. Irene Tedrow plays Inez Thudd, the governess.: Notes: Grandmama wrestles an alligator and defeats it in 12 seconds, and then Blossom Rock gets an opportunity for wordplay and comedy, which she uses admirably. Inez Thudd, ("call me Thudd"), the governess, seems at first to be almost one of the Addams family, saying that she likes the house, and encouraging Wednesday to have a positive attitude about her broken guillotine. Character actor Loyal T. (Doc) Lucas plays the proprietor of the Last Chance Motel. Hurricane Zsa Zsa may have been an inside joke; Zsa Zsa Gabor's sister Eva Gabor was starring in another of Filmway's productions at the time, Green Acres.; Family mentioned: Old Ebenezer Addams who was said to be "inspiring" after he sold the first guns to the Indians. Great Grandfather Blob - who pried the "Great Star of the East", the sacred ruby from the head of a Hindu. Cousin Nanook (last mentioned in "The Addams Family Splurges") whose family's four faces are carved in a totem pole.
| 52 | 18 | "Fester Goes on a Diet" | Sidney Lanfield | Hannibal Coons & Harry Winkler | January 14, 1966 |
For his impending visit from pen pal Yvette, Uncle Fester is secretly trying to whip himself into shape, even recruiting guidance from fitness guru Jack LaLanne himself. With all the sudden dieting and exercise going on, Morticia and Gomez think there may be a health issue. They decide to call in a Dr. Motley to check on Fester. When the Doctor leaves abruptly, Morticia decides to probe Fester's subconscious using hypnosis. This leads them to think Fester's trying to join the space program. Fester eventually admits to Gomez and Morticia that he's trying to get into shape for his pen pal. When Yvette finally arrives, it becomes apparent that Fester didn't need to worry about his physique.: Notes: Fester's pen pal Yvette, from the Folies Bergère, is played by actress Peggy Mondo. Jack LaLanne guest-stars as himself, and William Keene plays the doctor who makes a house call on Fester. Rolfe Sedan makes another appearance as the postman. Although there are a couple of jokes about dieting, the main focus of the show is on exercise. Gomez repairs model trains in the living room.; Family mentioned: Cousin Slump - "one moment a brilliant nuclear physicist, the next he was running around Los Alamos in a three cornered hat and powdered wig". Grandpa Squint Adams - who said of Cousin Blob (stated to be a ghost in "Lurch Learns to Dance") that "two heads are better than one"; fifth and final reference to Grandpa Squint since "Fester's Punctured Romance", "Gomez the Politician", "Amnesia in the Addams Family", and "Morticia's Dilemma".
| 53 | 19 | "The Great Treasure Hunt" | Sidney Lanfield | Hannibal Coons & Harry Winkler | January 21, 1966 |
Morticia and Gomez are in the attic looking in Great-Grandfather Pegleg's old trunk and find a map. The Addams Family hire shady Captain Grimby (Nestor Paiva) and his first mate Mr. Brack (Richard Reeves) to help them find the buried treasure that was hidden by Pegleg. But the men they hire to give them a ride to the Caribbean turn out to be crooks. They plan to steal the map so that they would be the ones who claim the treasure. Grimby and Brack break into the house at night and try to get Fester to give them the combination to the safe where the map is stored. When the booby-trapped safe blows up on them, the men leave. Morticia and Gomez decode the map and find that the treasure is under their house. They find the treasure but it's not what they expected.: Notes: Wednesday and Pugsley come home from school; Pugsley is casually carrying a lighted stick of dynamite. This episode is the second appearance of the gumball machine.; Family mentioned: Great-Grandfather Pegleg - wanted by 15 countries for piracy. Wore a pegleg just for appearances. Buried at sea with full military honors - handcuffed, blindfolded and dropped off a plank. Portrait of Uncle Droop (who "appeared" as an urn of ashes in "Lurch Learns to Dance") in an American Civil War general's uniform with eyes popping off the painting; Droop is identical in appearance to General Ulysses S. Addams (mentioned in "Uncle Fester's Toupee"), implying that the former is a direct descendant of the latter. Portrait of Aunt Drip (previously seen in "Lurch Learns to Dance"), who was married to Uncle Droop (normal looking).
| 54 | 20 | "Ophelia Finds Romance" | Sidney Lanfield | Hannibal Coons & Harry Winkler | January 28, 1966 |
Morticia's sister Ophelia has a new beau named Horatio Bartholomew (Robert Nichols). The family is convinced he is a fraud, so they attempt to reveal him. Morticia and Gomez have Mama use her crystal ball to find out about Horatio. Mama says he's rich, elegant, unattached and would make a perfect husband for Ophelia. Morticia and Gomez continue to try and discredit Horatio, but to no avail. Morticia even tries flirting with him, but he says he loves Ophelia. Morticia and Gomez learn Horatio is everything that he claimed to be. But when Horatio puts down the Addam's lifestyle, Ophelia decides he is not right for her.: Notes: Gomez is repairing his model trains again. Ophelia bangs on the gumball machine and looks to see if anything came out. Shakespeare is referenced again; Ophelia mentions "slings and arrows" and her boyfriend is named Horatio. Ophelia performs a judo throw on Horatio and goes up and down the fireman's pole. She says that it's fun.
| 55 | 21 | "Pugsley's Allowance" | Sidney Lanfield | Harry Winkler & Hannibal Coons | February 4, 1966 |
Pugsley shocks his parents when he announces that he wants to find a job. However, his method of job-hunting leaves a lot to be desired. Gomez again offers Pugsley an allowance, but he insists that he wants to work for his money. Pugsley and Wednesday get a job doing chores for the Henson family. Mr. Henson is not at all happy with the job the children did and says he will sue Gomez for the damages. Mr. Henson eventually says he's sorry and Gomez offers to buy his house.: Notes: Parley Baer is Mr. Henson and Natalie Masters is Mrs. Henson, again. Pugley attempts to find a job with Dr. Bird (television actor Jack Collins), bank vice-president Mr. Glenville (Robert Carson, credited as Robert S. Carson) and bookie "Bennie" (Tim Herbert). Morticia ties Gomez up in chains and ropes so he can practice being an "escape artist". He plays three scenes while bound. Mr. Henson's garage appears to be Mr. Ed's stable door. (Note: Both shows were Filmways productions, and the double-Dutch door with the diagonal trim is unmistakable.); Family mentioned: Cousin Goop who really knew how to look for a job, but never found one.
| 56 | 22 | "Happy Birthday, Grandma Frump" | Sidney Lanfield | Elroy Schwartz | February 11, 1966 |
Morticia and Gomez can't understand how the annual charity bizarre could have overlooked them this year. It's for the good cause of building a retirement home. But Gomez has plans of his own for a retirement home, complete with a polo field, skateboarding ramps and tennis courts. Meanwhile, it's Granny Frump's (Margaret Hamilton) birthday. Morticia and Gomez want her to visit so they can surprise her with a trip to a beauty spa. Granny Frump mistakenly believes that Gomez and Morticia are sending her to the retirement home instead. Granny Frump tries to prove that she is not old. She changes her behavior to convince them she's not ready to go, which only makes them believe she needs to go to a mental hospital instead.: Notes: In the opening scene, Gomez and Morticia are sharing a hookah; later, Morticia pets the smoking dragon again. Margaret Hamilton dressing as a child in a sailor-suit blouse with a big hair bow is priceless. She owns in this episode, which partly appears to be designed around her own joke about her lack of conventional beauty: when told that she would play the Wicked Witch of the West in The Wizard of Oz, she said, "What else?". But certainly it is not she on the pogo stick, doing cartwheels and jumping rope, nor is it John Astin dismounting from the parallel bars. Wednesday's poem, "A Spider is a Girl's Best Friend", is a charming performance. George Petrie plays Dr. Jonley who assesses Granny Frump's suitability for the mental hospital.
| 57 | 23 | "Morticia the Decorator" | Sidney Salkow | Gene Thompson | February 18, 1966 |
The Digbys moved in next door three weeks ago. Joe Digby sells insurance, and the Addamses decide to get some as part of their "good neighbor policy". As part of the National Beautification Program, Morticia decides to make herself available as a home decorator. She needs a showcase to model her abilities. The Digbys, who can't wait to move away from the Addames, are looking for a home decorator. Mrs. Digby is understandably reluctant to turn her house over to Morticia. Uncle Fester secretly unloads "attic junk" on them as a house warming gift. Mrs. Digby finally trusts Morticia taste, much to her eventual regret.: Notes: Gomez plays a slot machine in the opening segment. After the insurance deal, Fester and Lurch deliver an "authentic Sheraton" sideboard (Note: This appears to be a real Sheraton sideboard.) to the Digbys as a housewarming present. Then the Digbys go on vacation and Morticia goes to work. While Gomez is using the trampoline, standing on his head and practicing sword-swallowing, Morticia presents him with decorating ideas. Eddie Quillan appears again, this time as Joe Digby, and Jeff Donnell plays Eleanor Digby, his wife.
| 58 | 24 | "Ophelia Visits Morticia" | Sidney Lanfield | Art Weingarten | February 25, 1966 |
Ophelia's fiancé Montrose (George Cisar) has left her to join the Peace Corps. The family attempts to enroll Fester in the Peace Corps so he can retrieve him. Everyone tries to help Fester study for the test. Gomez learns that there is no place for Fester in the Corps. So as to not hurt his feelings, Morticia and Gomez try to get Fester to think he is more needed at home. In the end, Montrose returns to Ophelia. Notes: As soon as Ophelia arrives and Gomez greets her she judo-throws him. And then again. There are suicide jokes, such as Gomez's "I'll tell Morticia there'll be one less for lunch". Gomez takes his coat off and reveals sleeve garters and a cummerbund. Modern art is mocked when Morticia decides to burn her paintings, and then paints Fester as an angel. Preparation for a career in the Peace Corps is parodied. Motion picture character actor George Cisar gets a credit, which was rare for his movie appearances.
| 59 | 25 | "Addams Cum Laude" | Sidney Lanfield | Sloan Nibley & Bill Lutz | March 4, 1966 |
After the children are scolded at school for setting off dynamite caps at recess, Morticia and Gomez enroll them at Mockridge Private School headed by their "old friend" Sam Hilliard (Allyn Joslyn). Hilliard is not happy about having the Addamses in his life again. Gomez thinks he's under too much pressure from his board of regents, so he surprises Sam by buying Mockridge Hall. Gomez changes the name to Addams Hall and will have it run "as it should be run". This means there will be courses in head-shrinking, taxidermy, do-it-yourself dentistry and demolition by dynamite. When Hilliard quits, Gomez assumes the roll of Headmaster. The other children's mothers insist on Hilliard returning and Gomez gives him complete control. Wednesday and Pugsley decide to go back to public school.: Notes: Thing mysteriously shows up in Mr. Hillard's office. Later he lights Gomez's cigar with a lit finger. Preparing for classes, Morticia is examining objects on a table: a small orrery, a (bent) metal model of spherical coordinates, a pile of old slates, a couple of old lanterns, perhaps kerosene, and one with a candle, a spyglass, a wind-up phonograph that Fester demonstrates, what appears to be a magic lantern, and other objects. Gomez and Morticia look into a funhouse mirror. While Lurch plays harpsichord, Thing plays a glockenspiel, Fester plays cymbals, Morticia plays a lyre, and Gomez plays a percussion instrument made from a tambourine, a cowbell, a wood block, a small hi-hat, and the pogo stick.; Actress Carol Byron plays Mr. Hillard's secretary. Actress Pat Brown plays Mrs. Bennet, the spokesperson for a delegation of parents.; Family mention: Old Erasmus Addams who once said "You've got to take the bull by the teeth".
| 60 | 26 | "Cat Addams" | Stanley Z. Cherry | "Paul Tuckahoe" | March 11, 1966 |
Kitty Cat is feeling under the weather and not eating, leaving the family to speculate over what could be wrong. Dr. Mbogo will not treat Kitty Cat as it seemed that Dr. Mbogo's father was eaten by Kitty Cat's father. The Addams family calls in a veterinarian named Marvin P. Gunderson (Marty Ingels) who is reluctant to treat Kitty Cat. Morticia believes the doctor's skittishness around Kitty is entirely due to a lack of self-confidence. She has the others in the family feign ailments and then have ego-boosting miraculous recoveries. Gunderson treats Cleopatra, Cousin Itt and Uncle Fester, but runs away when he sees Thing. Turns out Kitty Cat wasn't hungry because Pugsley had fed him earlier. Notes: Kitty Cat somehow turns into a female while in the cave. Marty Ingels previously starred with John Astin in "I'm Dickens, He's Fenster". Loyal "Doc" Lucas makes another appearance as the hunter living near Dr. Mbogo's village who answers the telephone through archive footage. Gomez says "Umgawa" when on the phone to Africa with Dr. Mbogo. (Note: This is a genuine word in the Bantu language that was used in the Tarzan movies.) Family mention: Uncle Fester's death rattles reminds Gomez of Edwin Booth Addams: not when he made theatrical history, when he died.
| 61 | 27 | "Lurch's Little Helper" | Sidney Lanfield | Phil Leslie | March 18, 1966 |
Morticia believes they're overworking Lurch, so Gomez builds a robot named Smiley (Robby the Robot) to help Lurch around the house. Lurch is initially disturbed by this new situation but grows to accept it before taking complete advantage of it. Lurch orders the robot to do all his jobs, but the work (for example, cooking) is poor. Though the family isn't pleased with Smiley's capabilities, they praise them for Lurch's sake, but perhaps too much. This has Lurch looking at Smiley not as helping him out but as helping him right out of his job. In the dénouement Smiley is forcibly dismantled off-screen; when asked of his whereabouts, he simply pats a wrench meaningfully and says "Retired". Notes: Gomez recites part of "Dem Bones" while using a pointer on an anatomy chart, which is supposedly the design of his creation. When he starts to assemble the robot, he asks Fester for a screwdriver, and Fester hands him a drink, which he drains and then says, "Delicious". (Note: At this time, liquor advertising was suppressed on TV by agreement and there was also general agreement not to show any drinking on television shows, although it was sometimes implied, notably on Bewitched and The Dean Martin Show.) There is a shooting gallery installed in the living room. Lurch is shown taking a break in an easy chair, reading a book and smoking a calabash. Later he dresses elegantly and is prepared to go for a walk ("My constitutional", he says). "Smiley" is billed as "Itself". Family mentioned: Morticia's painting of Cousin Crimp (two-headed with a male and female head) is shown after being previously mentioned in "Lurch and his Harpsichord", "Morticia, the Breadwinner", and "Morticia's Dilemma"; fourth and final reference to Cousin Crimp.
| 62 | 28 | "The Addams Policy" | Sidney Lanfield | Harry Winkler & Hannibal Coons | March 25, 1966 |
When Uncle Fester tries to use a flamethrower to light Gomez's cigar, he destroys the gigantic stuffed bear. Joe Digby forgot to cancel the Addams's insurance policy covering household accidents, although his boss Arthur Henson ordered it. Henson tears up the Addams policy and fires Digby. Now the Addams feel compelled to help Mr. Digby find another job. In the end, Gomez finds a way to get Digby his job back. They even get their bear replaced, that is until Fester has another accident with the flamethrower. Notes: A mango plantation (with cannibals next door), a crocodile farm in Mozambique, and tapioca mines on the top of Mount Everest are a few of the things that Gomez owns. After Digby is fired by Henson, Gomez (at Morticia's suggestion) sets up the Digby Insurance Company at the Addams house (50% off, Free Dishes With Every Purchase). Mockery of the insurance business, beginning with Henson's admonition to Digby that there are two sides to insurance. When Henson and Digby drive up to the Addams house, they get out of the car and slam the car doors to the Addams theme music -- slam slam. Guest stars: Parley Baer and Eddie Quillan reprise their roles as Henson and Digby, respectively.
| 63 | 29 | "Lurch's Grand Romance" | Sidney Lanfield | Gene Thompson & Art Weingarten | April 1, 1966 |
Morticia's school chum Trivia (Diane Jergens, in her last on-screen appearance) visits. Lurch is obviously smitten by her, but Trivia's interest is entirely in show business. Morticia decides to change Trivia's mind by making Lurch more exciting than show biz. She enlists others in the family to help. Grandmama uses her love potion on Trivia and she falls for Lurch, which actually frightens him off. She then falls for Gomez and then Fester. Fortunately, the love potion soon wears off. Notes: Lurch gets lessons in romance from Gomez, Wednesday and Fester. Wednesday dances to rock-and-roll while egging Lurch on. "Romeo and Juliet" is the subject of a joke about living "happily ever after". Grandmama administers a love potion to Trivia, which causes chaos. Trivia, a non-relative, shares a name with both Aunt Trivia "Lurch and His Harpsichord" and "Morticia's Romance: Part 1" and Cousin Trivia who was previously mentioned in "Cousin Itt and the Vocational Counselor". Family mentioned: "Casanova" Addams who was jailed for non-payment of alimony.
| 64 | 30 | "Ophelia's Career" | Sidney Lanfield | Harry Winkler & Hannibal Coons | April 8, 1966 |
When Ophelia laments that she has been jilted again, Morticia suggests a career as an alternative to marriage. The family tries to find something she's good at. Ophelia tries chemistry with Fester but Gomez hears her singing and suggests an opera career. After having Cousin Itt try to teach her, Gomez hires Signor Bellini. Bellini is impressed enough that he wants to have Impresario Rudolpho hear her, but after using a throat spray that Fester cooked up, her voice is ruined. Notes Ophelia judo-throws Gomez three times soon after her arrival. Ophelia parodies the advertising slogan, "There's something about an Aqua Velva man". She also sings the beginning of "The Last Rose of Summer". There are jokes about popular songs and classical music. New props in the living room include a sawmill saw, welding equipment, a rifle, a barrel and objects hanging from the ceiling (e.g. a penny-farthing). Ben Wright and Ralph Rose are guest stars. Family mentioned: "Sir Newton" Addams, a scientist who set his house on fire.

=== Special (1977) ===
| Title | Directed by | Written by | Original release date |
|---|---|---|---|
| Halloween with the New Addams Family | David Steinmetz | George Tibbles | October 30, 1977 |
In this reunion special, the Addams Family, Gomez and Morticia's latest children Wednesday Jr. and Pugsley Jr., and Gomez's younger brother Pancho (Henry Darrow) celebrate Halloween and the legend of Cousin Shy with their extended family. At the same time, a criminal named "Bones" Lafferty (Parley Baer) and his gang plan to target the Addams Family fortune. Family mentioned: Uncle Faustus (who rattled his chains in his grave distracting Uncle Fester during his hide and seek game with Cousin Itt, Wednesday Jr., and Pugsley Jr.), Bluebeard Addams (whose tombstone quoted "He gave his life..."), Cousin Ahab (whose fate is similar to Cousin Farouk from "The Addams Family Tree" and Cousin Squint from "Uncle Fester's Toupee" with the inclusion of his famous line "Don't give up the fish"), Miss Salem Addams (whose tombstone reads "Here Today - Here Tomorrow 1730 - 1830"), Charles Freeze Addams (whose tombstone reads "Home Sweet Home"), Cousin Ptolemy (who was or was not inside a gorilla suit at the Halloween party), Cousin Sloth (who plays the melodic banjo), Uncle Morbid (who Morticia told to "be of good cheer" as he was leaving the party).

== Home releases ==
MGM Home Entertainment released The Addams Family on DVD in Region 1 in 2006 and 2007, in three volumes, and a complete set including all 64 episodes.

| Season | Volume | Episodes | Release date | Additional information |
|---|---|---|---|---|
| 1 | 1 | 22 ("The Addams Family Goes to School" – "Amnesia in the Addams Family") | August 10, 2006 | Audio commentary for "The Addams Family Goes to School" by cast members Lisa Loring, Ken Weatherwax, and Felix Silla, along with The Addams Chronicles author Stephen Cox; You Rang, Mr. Addams featurette; Snap, Snap featurette; Theme Song Karaoke |
| 1 | 2 | 21 ("Thing Is Missing" – "Morticia, the Sculptress") | March 27, 2007 | Mad About the Addams featurette: Experts discuss the history and impact of the show; Thing and Cousin Itt commentaries; Guest Star Séance interactive featurette: A magical crystal ball conjures guest star clips and trivia; Tombstone Trivia on "Morticia's Romance, Part 1" Episode; Audio commentary with The Addams Chronicles author Stephen Cox |
| 2 | 2 | 21 ("Thing Is Missing" – "Morticia, the Sculptress") | March 27, 2007 | Mad About the Addams featurette: Experts discuss the history and impact of the show; Thing and Cousin Itt commentaries; Guest Star Séance interactive featurette: A magical crystal ball conjures guest star clips and trivia; Tombstone Trivia on "Morticia's Romance, Part 1" Episode; Audio commentary with The Addams Chronicles author Stephen Cox |
| 2 | 3 | 21 ("Gomez, the Reluctant Lover" – "Ophelia's Career") | September 11, 2007 | Thing and Cousin Itt commentaries.; Audio commentary with Stephen Cox, author of "The Addams Chronicles".; Tombstone Trivia on "Cat Addams" Episode. |
| Complete series box set | | 64 | November 13, 2007 | Special "velvet-touch" package. |
