= Joey D. Vieira =

American actor (1944–2025)

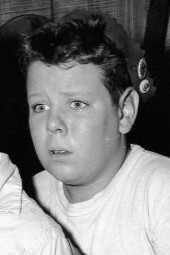
- Vieira on Lassie, 1956
- Born: Joseph Douglas Vieira; April 8, 1944; Los Angeles, California, U.S.
- Died: April 7, 2025 (aged 80)
- Other name: Donald Keeler
- Occupation: Actor
- Years active: 1955–2014
- Relatives: Ken Weatherwax (half brother); Ruby Keeler (aunt)

Joseph Douglas Vieira (April 8, 1944 – April 7, 2025), known as Joey D. Vieira, was an American film and television actor. He began as a child actor using the professional name Donald Keeler playing Sylvester "Porky" Brockway in the first several seasons (1954–57) of Lassie. Vieira borrowed the professional surname from his aunt, Ruby Keeler, star of numerous Warner Bros. musicals in the 1930s.

His other early television appearances included recurring roles in The Pride of the Family and Hank, and guest appearances in The Many Loves of Dobie Gillis, Shirley Temple's Storybook, and My Three Sons. Later in his career he appeared in episodes of Moonlighting, Remington Steele, and Married...With Children. His film appearances include The Private War of Major Benson (1955) with Charlton Heston, and The Patriot (2000) with Mel Gibson in which he played as Peter Howard. Vieira also wrote, produced, and directed.

He also had a music career in the 1970s and 1980s. One of his songs was sampled by the Tyler, the Creator song "911/Mr.Lonely" on his album Flower Boy.

== Personal life and death ==
In addition to being the nephew of the late Ruby Keeler, he was the older half-brother of the late child actor Ken Weatherwax, widely known for portraying Pugsley Addams on the 1960s television sitcom The Addams Family. Weatherwax and Vieira were the nephews of Lassie's owner and trainer, Rudd Weatherwax.

Vieira died following a long illness while receiving hospice care, on April 7, 2025, the day before his 81st birthday.

== Partial filmography ==
- The Private War of Major Benson (1955) – Cadet Cpl. Scawalski
- Bob & Carol & Ted & Alice (1969) – Dishwasher (uncredited)
- Evel Knievel (1971) – Lunch Truck Driver
- Wooju heukgisa (1979) – (English version, voice)
- Monaco Forever (1984) – Narrator
- Ferris Bueller's Day Off (1986) – Pizza Man
- Red Heat (1988) – Man at Phone Booth
- Love, Cheat & Steal (1993) – Bullet Head #1
- Me and the Gods (1997) – Dionysus
- Free Enterprise (1998) – Hal Pittman
- Grizzly Adams and the Legend of Dark Mountain (1999) – Joey Butterworth
- The Patriot (2000) – Peter Howard
- Nebraska (2001) – Fat Sam
- Fuel (2008) – Floyd Miller
- Dwegons And Leprechauns (2014) – Davargan / Yabo Potato / Sweetfang / Clyde (voice)
