= Ruby Keeler =

Canadian-American actress, dancer, and singer (1909–1993)

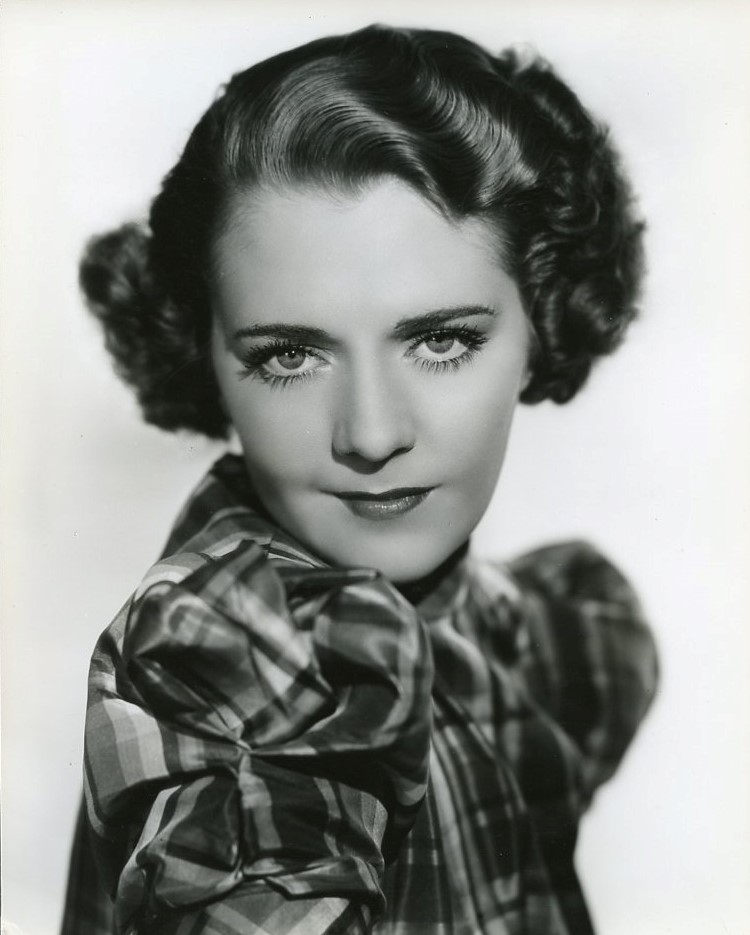
- Keeler in 1935
- Born: Ethel Ruby Keeler; August 25, 1909; Dartmouth, Nova Scotia, Canada
- Died: February 28, 1993 (aged 83); Rancho Mirage, California, U.S.
- Resting place: Holy Sepulcher Cemetery, Orange, California, U.S.
- Occupations: Actress; dancer; singer
- Years active: 1923–1989
- Spouses: Al Jolson (m. 1928; div. 1940) John Homer Lowe (m. 1941; died 1969)
- Children: 5
- Relatives: Joey D. Vieira (nephew); Ken Weatherwax (nephew)
- Awards: Hollywood Walk of Fame; Palm Springs Walk of Stars

Ethel Ruby Keeler (August 25, 1909 – February 28, 1993) was a Canadian and American actress, dancer, and singer who was paired on-screen with Dick Powell in a string of successful early musicals at Warner Bros., particularly 42nd Street (1933). From 1928 to 1940, she was married to actor and singer Al Jolson. She retired from show business in the 1940s, but made a widely publicized comeback on Broadway starring in the revival of the 1920s musical No, No, Nanette in 1971.

== Early life ==
Keeler was born in Dartmouth, Nova Scotia, Canada, in 1909 (though Ruby claimed she was born in 1910) to Ralph Hector and Nellie (née Lahey) Keeler, one of six siblings in an Irish Catholic family. Two sisters, Helen and Gertrude, had brief performing careers. Her father was a truck driver. When Ruby was three years old, her family moved to New York City, where her father could get better pay. Although Keeler was interested in taking dance lessons, the family could not afford to send her.

Keeler attended St. Catherine of Siena on New York's East Side, and one period each week, a dance teacher taught all styles of dance. The teacher saw potential in Keeler and spoke to her mother about Ruby taking lessons at her studio. Though her mother declined, apologizing for the lack of money, the teacher wanted to work with her so badly that she asked her mother if she would bring her to class lessons on Saturdays, and she agreed.

During the classes, a girl told her about auditions for chorus girls. The law required professional chorus girls to be at least 16 years old; although they were only 13, they decided to lie about their ages at the audition. It was a tap audition, and many other talented girls were there. The stage was covered except for a wooden apron at the front. When it was Ruby's turn to dance, she asked the dance director, Julian Mitchell, if she could dance on the wooden part so that her taps could be heard. He did not answer, so she went ahead, walked up to the front of the stage, and started her routine. The director said "Who said you could dance up there?" She replied "I asked you!", and she got a job in George M. Cohan's The Rise of Rosie O'Reilly (1923), in which she made $45 per week, equal to $850 today.

== Early dance career ==
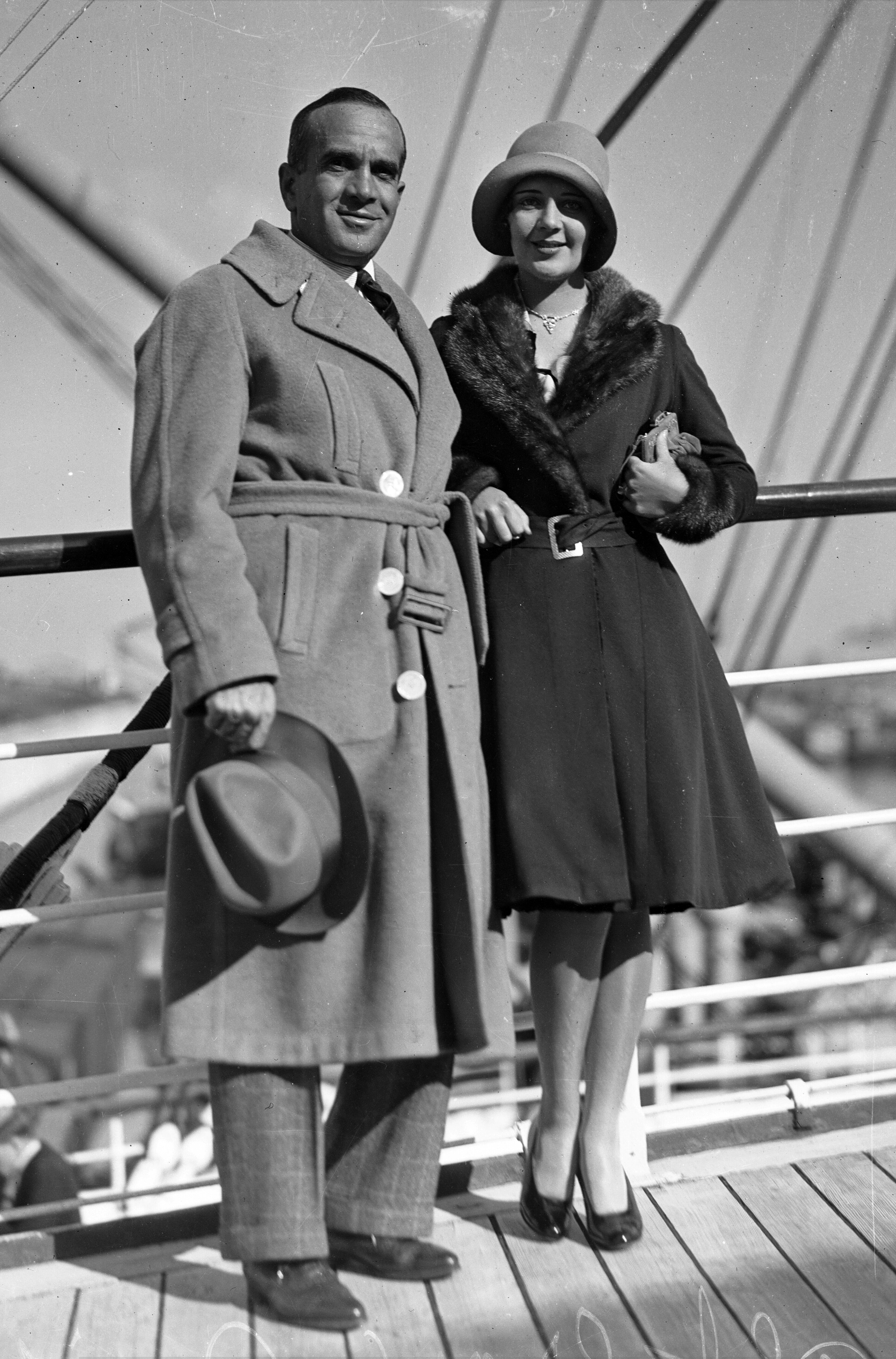
Newlyweds Al Jolson and Ruby Keeler aboard the Olympic in September 1928

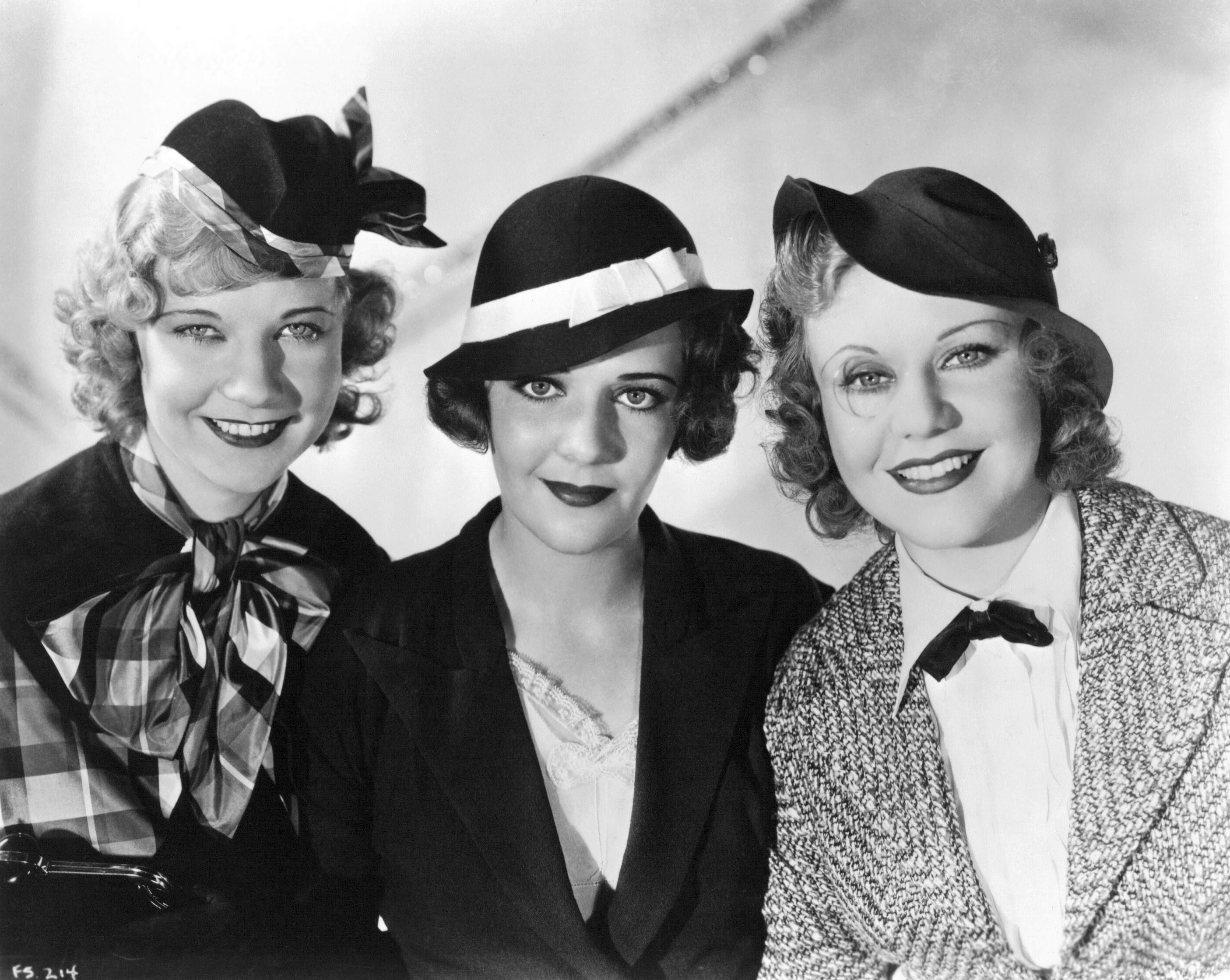
Una Merkel, Ruby Keeler, and Ginger Rogers in 42nd Street (1933)

Around 1923, when she was around 14 years old, she was hired by Nils Granlund, the publicity manager for Loews Theaters, who also served as the stage-show producer for Texas Guinan at Larry Fay's El Fay nightclub, a speakeasy frequented by gangsters. She was noticed by Broadway producer Charles B. Dillingham, who gave her a role in Bye, Bye, Bonnie (produced by L. Lawrence Weber), which ran for six months. She then appeared in Lucky and as Mamie in The Sidewalks of New York, also produced by Dillingham. In the later show, she was seen by Flo Ziegfeld, who sent her a bunch of roses and a note that stated, "May I make you a star?"

She appeared in Ziegfeld's Whoopee! (before being replaced before the opening by Ethel Shutta) in 1928, the same year she married Al Jolson. The two met in Los Angeles (not at Texas Guinan's as he would claim), where Granlund had sent her to assist in the marketing campaign for The Jazz Singer. Jolson was smitten and immediately proposed. The couple married September 21, 1928, in Port Chester, New York, in a private ceremony. The two sailed the following morning for a brief honeymoon before she began her tour with Whoopee! She was 19 years old, and he was around 42.

In 1933, producer Darryl F. Zanuck cast Keeler in the Warner Bros. musical 42nd Street opposite Dick Powell and Bebe Daniels. The film was a huge success due to Busby Berkeley's lavish, innovative choreography. Following 42nd Street, Jack L. Warner gave Keeler a long-term contract and cast her in Gold Diggers of 1933, Footlight Parade, Dames, and Colleen. Keeler and Jolson starred together in Go into Your Dance, which was their only film together. They are satirized in Frank Tashlin's 1937 cartoon The Woods Are Full of Cuckoos. Jolson and Keeler appeared on Broadway one last time together for the unsuccessful show Hold on to Your Hats.

== Later life ==
In 1963, Keeler appeared in The Greatest Show on Earth, Jack Palance's television series based on the earlier Charlton Heston circus film of the same name, and made a brief cameo in the 1970 film The Phynx. In 1971, Keeler was acclaimed as a star again in the successful Broadway revival of the 1920s musical No, No, Nanette, opposite Jack Gilford, Bobby Van, Helen Gallagher, and Patsy Kelly. The production was supervised by Keeler's 42nd Street director Busby Berkeley, adapted and directed by Burt Shevelove, and choreographed by Donald Saddler, who won the Tony Award for his musical staging. Keeler starred in the musical for two seasons on Broadway, followed by two additional years touring in the show. After suffering a brain aneurysm in 1974, she became spokeswoman for the National Stroke Association.

=== Honors ===
Keeler has a star on the Hollywood Walk of Fame at 6730 Hollywood Boulevard. In 1979, she was awarded an honorary doctor of humane letters degree by St. Bonaventure University. In 1992, a Golden Palm Star on the Palm Springs Walk of Stars was dedicated to her.

== Personal life and death ==
Keeler and Jolson adopted a son, but later divorced in 1940. In 1941, she married John Homer Lowe, a businessman, and left show business the same year. She returned for occasional TV guest appearances beginning in the mid-1950s and a very few small cameo film roles starting in 1970; she also returned to Broadway in 1970. Keeler and Lowe had four children. Lowe died in 1969.

Keeler had two nephews who also worked in the film business. Joey D. Vieira, also known as Donald Keeler, is best remembered for portraying Sylvester "Porky" Brockway on TV's Lassie (retitled Jeff's Collie in syndicated reruns and on DVD) from 1954 to 1957. Vieira's brother, Ken Weatherwax, played Pugsley Addams on the 1960s TV series The Addams Family. Ruby's son John Lowe had a career as a Broadway stage manager for a number of productions beginning with No, No, Nanette in 1970.

=== Death ===
Keeler died of kidney cancer on February 28, 1993, in Rancho Mirage, California, aged 83.

== Filmography ==
=== Features ===
| Year | Title | Role |
|---|---|---|
| 1930 | Show Girl in Hollywood | Herself |
| 1933 | 42nd Street | Peggy Sawyer |
| 1933 | Gold Diggers of 1933 | Polly Parker |
| 1933 | Footlight Parade | Bea Thorn |
| 1934 | Dames | Barbara |
| 1934 | Flirtation Walk | Kit Fitts |
| 1935 | Go into Your Dance | Dorothy "Dot" Wayne |
| 1935 | Shipmates Forever | June Blackburn |
| 1936 | Colleen | Colleen Rilley |
| 1937 | Ready, Willing and Able | Jane |
| 1938 | Mother Carey's Chickens | Katherine "Kitty" Carey |
| 1941 | Sweetheart of the Campus | Betty Blake |
| 1970 | The Phynx | Herself |
| 1989 | Beverly Hills Brats | Goldie |

=== Short subjects ===
- Ruby Keeler (1929)
- Screen Snapshots Series 9, No. 20 (1930)
- And She Learned About Dames (1934)
- Screen Snapshots Series 16, No. 7 (1937)
- A Day at Santa Anita (1937)
- Hollywood Handicap (1938)
- Screen Snapshots: Hollywood Recreation (1940)

== Stage work ==
- The Rise of Rosie O'Reilly (1923)
- Bye, Bye, Bonnie (1927)
- Lucky (1927)
- Sidewalks of New York (1927)
- Whoopee! (1928) (replaced by Ethel Shutta before opening)
- Show Girl (1929)
- Hold on to Your Hats (1940) (replaced by Eunice Healey before opening)
- No, No, Nanette (1971)
