= Ken Weatherwax =

American actor (1955–2014)

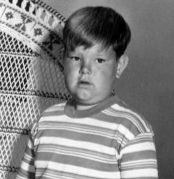
- A 1964 publicity still for The Addams Family
- Born: Kenneth Patrick Weatherwax; September 29, 1955; Los Angeles, California, U.S.
- Died: December 7, 2014 (aged 59); West Hills, California, U.S.
- Resting place: Valhalla Memorial Park Cemetery
- Occupation: Actor
- Years active: 1964–1966, 1973, 1977
- Family: Joey D. Vieira (half-brother); Ruby Keeler (aunt)

Kenneth Patrick Weatherwax (September 29, 1955 – December 7, 2014) was an American child actor best known for having played Pugsley Addams on the original black-and-white TV series The Addams Family.

== Early life ==
Weatherwax was born in Los Angeles into a show-business family. His aunt was actress and dancer Ruby Keeler. Beginning in 1954, his half-brother, Joey D. Vieira, played Porky on the first three seasons of Lassie under the stage name of Donald Keeler. Ken Weatherwax's uncles were Frank and Rudd Weatherwax, Lassie's trainers and owners of the first dog to play the role.

== Career ==
Weatherwax made his acting debut in the early 1960s when he was age 9, playing a boy named Chester in a commercial for Gleem toothpaste. He was cast as Pugsley Addams on The Addams Family. The program ran for two seasons from 1964 to 1966. After its cancellation, Weatherwax found he was typecast as Pugsley and lost interest in acting.

As Weatherwax matured, he lost his chubby physique. He entered the U.S. Army at age 17 and, at age 21, he reprised the role of Pugsley in the 1977 reunion film Halloween with the New Addams Family, although Pugsley was now shown as a tall, muscular character. He established a career behind the camera as a movie studio grip and set builder, and made occasional appearances at Addams Family-related events with former costar Lisa Loring, who had played Pugsley's younger sister Wednesday Addams on the show. The two remained lifelong friends.

== Death ==
Weatherwax died on December 7, 2014, of a heart attack at his home in West Hills, California, at the age of 59. Via a crowdfunding campaign, the owner of Dearly Departed Tours & Artifact Museum raised the funds to have Weatherwax interred in Valhalla Memorial Park Cemetery in North Hollywood in 2017. A portion of his cremated remains are located at Dearly Departed Tours & Artifact Museum.

== Filmography ==
Year	Title	Role	Notes
1964–1966	The Addams Family	Pugsley Addams	64 episodes
1977	Halloween with the New Addams Family	Pugsley Sr	TV movie
