= Dearly Departed Tours & Artifact Museum =

Bus tour in Los Angeles

Coordinates: 34°5′27.4″N 118°19′5.3″W

Dearly Departed Tours and Artifact Museum was a guided bus tour started in 2004 of the locations of tragic events in Hollywood, Los Angeles, such as the site of the Tate–LaBianca murders perpetrated by members of the Manson Family, and an adjacent museum with artifacts from these events.

It was created by author, documentarian and historian Scott Michaels. Michaels coined the term "Death Hag" which has been embraced by the community who are devotees of celebrity death. The Artifact Museum museum was located on Santa Monica Boulevard, across from the Hollywood Forever Cemetery in Los Angeles, California. It opened in April 2017. It displayed the smashed 1966 Buick Electra sedan in which Jayne Mansfield died in 1967. Other items on display in the museum included Sharon Tate's brassiere, Carrie Fisher's cigarette butt, Annette Funicello's gun permit, Rock Hudson's death bed, Mae West's false teeth, and a funeral urn with the ashes of Michu Meszaros, a dwarf and stunt double who played ALF.

Via a crowdfunding campaign, the owner of the museum raised the funds to have Ken Weatherwax interred in Valhalla Memorial Park Cemetery in North Hollywood in 2017.

Scott Michaels was approached by Quentin Tarantino to be a consultant for the film Once Upon a Time in Hollywood, providing details of the Tate Labianca case, earning Scott a special thanks credit in the film.

The Dearly Departed Tours Museum shut down during the COVID-19 pandemic. A short time later, Michaels developed and launched a YouTube channel, “Dearly Departed Tours With Scott”; he regularly publishes video commentary which typically features discussion and reports of the circumstances of notable celebrity deaths, often accompanied by the decedents personal artifacts, as well as video footage of his graveside visits. As of November 2025, Michael’s channel has amassed over 500 videos, with a following of nearly 250,000 subscribers.

== External list ==
- Official website
