= The Addams Family (1964 TV series) =

American sitcom (1964–1966)

- Genre: Gothic; Sitcom
- Based on: The Addams Family by Charles Addams
- Developed by: David Levy
- Starring: Carolyn Jones; John Astin; Jackie Coogan; Ted Cassidy; Blossom Rock; Ken Weatherwax; Lisa Loring
- Opening theme: Vic Mizzy
- Country of origin: United States
- Original language: English
- No. of seasons: 2
- No. of episodes: 64 (list of episodes)

Production
- Executive producer: David Levy
- Producer: Nat Perrin
- Production locations: Hollywood, California
- Camera setup: Single-camera
- Running time: 26 minutes
- Production companies: Filmways Television; MGM Television

Original release
- Network: ABC
- Release: September 18, 1964 – April 8, 1966

Related
- The Munsters (1964–1966); Halloween with the New Addams Family

The Addams Family is an American Gothic sitcom based on Charles Addams's New Yorker cartoons. With an ensemble cast, the 30-minute television series took the unnamed characters in the single-panel gag cartoons and gave them names, backstories, and a household setting. The series was spearheaded by David Levy, who created and developed it with Donald Saltzman in cooperation with cartoonist Addams, who gave each character a name and description. Shot in black-and-white, The Addams Family aired for two seasons on ABC from September 18, 1964, to April 8, 1966, for a total of 64 episodes — its opening theme was composed and sung by Vic Mizzy.

The show was originally produced by head writer Nat Perrin for Filmways, at General Service Studios in Hollywood, California. Amazon now owns the rights to the series through Metro-Goldwyn-Mayer.

== Premise ==
The Addams family is a close-knit extended family with macabre interests and supernatural abilities, though no explanation for their powers is explicitly given in the series. The wealthy, enthusiastic Gomez Addams is madly in love with his wife, Morticia. Along with their daughter Wednesday, their son Pugsley, Uncle Fester, and Grandmama, they live at 0001 Cemetery Lane in an ornate, gloomy, Second Empire style mansion. The theme song contains the lyric, "Their house is a museum", which is borne out by the variety of objects in the interior scenes, some of which are collector's items and others of which are only bizarre (such as the mounted swordfish head with a human leg protruding from the mouth and a stuffed two-headed giant tortoise) – all props that were stolen once the series was cancelled.

The family is attended by their servants – towering butler Lurch, and Thing, a hand that appears from wooden boxes in various places in the house. Other relatives with recurring appearances included Gomez's Cousin Itt, Morticia's older sister Ophelia, and Morticia's mother Grandma Frump.

Much of the humor derives from the Addamses' culture clash with the rest of the world. They treat normal visitors with great warmth and courtesy, even when the guests express confusion, fear, or dismay at the house's decor or the sight of Lurch or Thing. Some visitors have bad intentions, which the family generally ignores, and suffer no harm. The Addamses are puzzled by the horrified reactions to their own good-natured and (to them) normal behavior. Accordingly, they view "conventional" tastes with generally tolerant suspicion. Almost invariably, visitors to the Addamses leave and don't return.

== Characters ==
=== Main characters ===
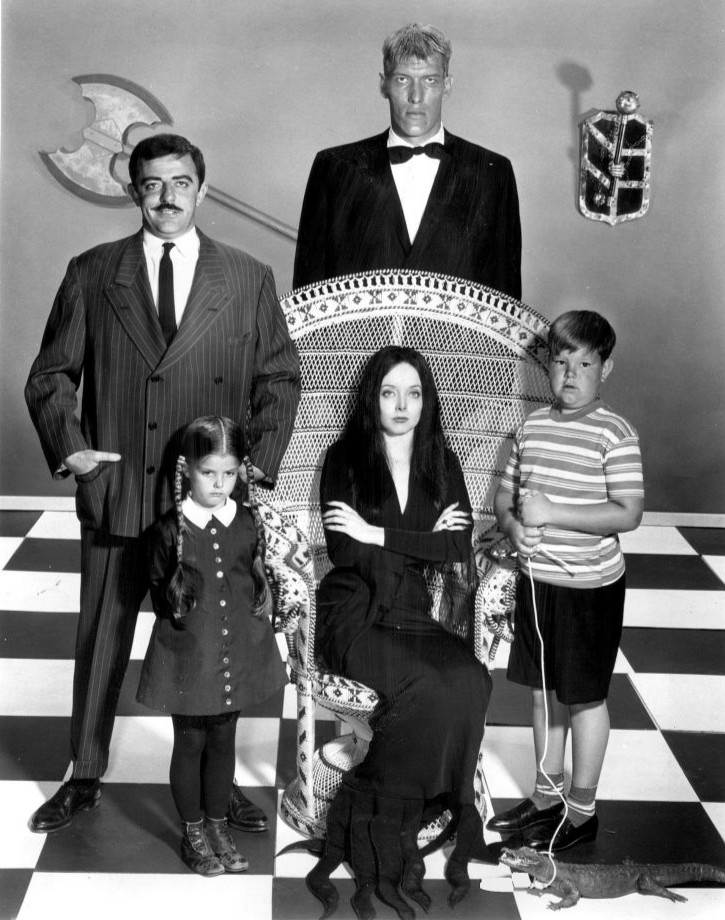
The main cast (clockwise from top left): Gomez (John Astin), Lurch (Ted Cassidy), Pugsley (Ken Weatherwax), Morticia (Carolyn Jones), and Wednesday (Lisa Loring).

Actor	Role	Character
John Astin	Gomez Addams	A retired lawyer, Gomez is of Castilian descent, as he refers to Spain as his "ancestral home". Gomez is passionately in love with his wife, often referring to her with Spanish pet names such as "Querida" and "Cara Mía". His ardor is greatly intensified when she speaks French (a running gag has Gomez mistaking other languages, including Yiddish, for French). Gomez is very wealthy, apparently as a result of owning numerous companies and stocks, and is often following the tape from a stock ticker installed in the living room. Gomez has a desk drawer and a safe full of cash. He squanders money in a cavalier manner and loses it on stocks, yet remains wealthy. His hobby is gleefully crashing and detonating model trains. He sometimes stands on his head as he reads the newspaper or plays solitaire. He is a member of the Zen Yogi society which seems to be a form of yoga where the positions often look strange or difficult for the human body. Regularly dressed in a double-breasted and chalk-striped suit with a black tie (even around the house), Gomez is almost always seen smoking a cigar. Astin based the character of Gomez on Groucho Marx. Like Groucho, Astin was also a cigar smoker; he then quit cigars after the series ended. As of 2026, John Astin is the only surviving member of the cast.
Carolyn Jones	Morticia Addams (née Frump)	A cultivated and beautiful woman, she knits, dabbles in art, plays the shamisen, raises a carnivorous plant, and trims roses by clipping off the buds and arranging the thorny stems in a vase. With long, straight ebony-black hair, she is always attired in a floor-length, black hobble skirt that ends, apparently, in a full set of tentacles. With her aristocratic bearing and detachment, she is often the calm center of the chaotic events of the household, but she performs magical feats effortlessly; for instance, in "Winning of Morticia Addams", she bounces a basketball through three baskets. She is an elegant woman, devoted to her family; she and Gomez are deeply in love.
Jackie Coogan	Uncle Fester	Morticia's uncle, he is completely bald and usually dressed in a dark, floor-length coat or robe with a large, fur collar. Fester is quite fond of dynamite and blasting caps. He often relaxes on a bed of nails, by inserting his head into a book press, or by being stretched on a wooden torture rack. Fester powers light bulbs by placing them into his mouth.
Ted Cassidy	Lurch	The Addams' loyal butler, he mainly speaks in grunts or groans. Morticia and Gomez summon him with a hangman's-noose bell pull, to which he immediately appears on screen and replies, "You rang?" On occasions, items such as an emergency bell or banging the knight armor can summon him if the usual bell ends up out of order. Lurch is very tall and physically imposing, and plays the 1503 vintage "Krupnik" harpsichord that was originally in Cousin Crimp's family for 400 years. After Lurch answers the door, he removes the hats of male visitors, usually crushing them in the process. He is frequently seen with a feather duster. Cassidy made a cameo appearance as Lurch on an episode of the Batman TV series, and on TV music shows while promoting the pop song of the era "The Lurch" (and the dance which it accompanied).
Blossom Rock	Grandmama Addams	Gomez's mother, she is a witch who conjures potions and spells and dabbles in fortune-telling with a crystal ball, and knife throwing. Sometimes, she is carrying a battle axe or sharpening it on a grinding wheel in the middle of the living room.
Lisa Loring	Wednesday Addams	Gomez and Morticia's daughter and the youngest member of the family, Wednesday is a strange yet sweet-natured little girl who enjoys keeping bizarre pets such as a black widow spider named Homer and a lizard named Lucifer, in addition to playing with a headless doll named Marie Antoinette.
Ken Weatherwax	Pugsley Addams	Gomez and Morticia's son and Wednesday's older brother, he is chubby, kind-hearted, and smart, and occasionally conforms to conventional standards contrary to his family, such as joining the Boy Scouts. He also enjoys engineering various machines, playing with blasting caps, and playing with his pet octopus Aristotle.
Itself	Thing	A disembodied hand, it appears out of boxes and other conveniently placed containers. Thing also appears from a knothole in a tree in the front yard, and in "The Addams Family in Court", Thing reaches out of Gomez's briefcase to hand him a legal paper in court. Gomez's constant "companion" since childhood, Thing is always ready to assist family members with minor daily services and diversions, such as lifting the receiver on telephones, retrieving the mail, lighting cigars, pouring tea, and playing chess. The tagline is, "Thank you, Thing". Thing sometimes appears from different containers at opposite ends of the room within seconds of each other. Though Ted Cassidy often portrayed Thing, assistant director Jack Voglin sometimes portrayed Thing in scenes in which Lurch and Thing appear together. Thing is sometimes a right hand, sometimes a left. Thing (sometimes "The Thing") was billed as "Itself" in the closing credits.

=== Pets ===
- Aristotle – Pugsley's pet octopus
- Cleopatra – Morticia's pet African strangler (a type of man-eating plant)
- Fang – Pugsley's pet jaguar
- Homer – Wednesday's pet spider
- Kitty Kat – The Addams Family's pet lion, in "The Addams Family Tree", Gomez mentioned that Kitty "can't stand the taste of people." In "Cat Addams", Kitty Kat's dad was claimed to have eaten the father of Dr. Mbogo, which explains why Dr. Mbogo will not treat Kitty Kat.
- Lucifer – Wednesday's pet lizard
- Tristan and Isolde – The Addams Family's pet piranhas
- Zelda – The family's pet vulture. This character was performed by a live male vulture named Igor.
- Grandmama also has an unnamed alligator in the basement pit that she is often seen wrestling.

=== Relatives ===
These relatives made appearances on the show, but members of the family mentioned other relatives in each of the episodes:

Actor	Role	Character
Felix Silla and Roger Arroyo	Cousin Itt	Gomez's cousin, Itt is a diminutive character composed entirely of floor-length hair accompanied by a bowler hat and sunglasses. He speaks in rapid, unintelligible gibberish that only the family can understand. He has a low-ceilinged room of his own in the house, but sometimes he is in the chimney of the living room fireplace. The character was created specifically for the television series.
Carolyn Jones	Ophelia Frump	Morticia's flighty flower child older sister who is the "white sheep of the family". In the two-part, second-season episode "Morticia's Romance", it is shown in a flashback that Gomez is originally engaged to Ophelia in an arranged marriage, but when he sees the then-22-year-old Morticia, they fall in love with each other. The flowers entwined in Ophelia's hair actually have roots that travel down into her foot, and the foot raises when one of the flowers is tugged on. She sings in three-part harmony and has a love of judo that enables her to flip men (usually Gomez) onto their backs. Ophelia was played by Carolyn Jones in a blonde wig, and along with Cousin Itt, was created specifically for the television series, appearing in family portrait artwork by Charles Addams after the show's debut.
Margaret Hamilton	Granny Hester Frump	The mother of Morticia and Ophelia and the grandmother of Wednesday and Pugsley, and sister of Fester. She is a witch and an old friend of Grandmama Addams'.
Hazel Shermet	Cousin Melancholia	A cousin of Morticia, she was repeatedly jilted. In "Morticia the Matchmaker", after her last fiancé ran off, Morticia and Gomez take her in and try to find her a husband.

=== Minor characters ===
Actor	Role	Character
Parley Baer	Arthur J. Henson	An insurance executive and politician in the town where the family resides
Eddie Quillan	Joe Digby	An insurance clerk who works for Arthur Henson, Eddie Quillan also played Clyde Arbogast, Arthur Henson's assistant in "Gomez, the People's Choice".
Allyn Joslyn	Sam Hilliard	A truant officer, he is scared to death of the family, although he does "find common ground" with them regarding the inadvisability of exposing children to "fairy-tale violence". Later, he runs a private school where Gomez briefly worked. In one episode, his middle name is given as "Lucifer", much to the family's delight ("Sam Hill" is an older American euphemism for Satan).
Rolfe Sedan	Mr. Briggs	The neighborhood mailman, he delivers the mail to the Addams house.
Vito Scotti	Sam Picasso	A scheming Spanish artist upon whom family members rely for artistic advice

== Episodes ==
Season	Episodes	Originally released	
Season	Episodes	First released	Last released
1	34	September 18, 1964	May 21, 1965
2	30	September 17, 1965	April 8, 1966
Special		October 30, 1977	

For both seasons, episodes aired Friday nights at 8:30 pm.

== Production ==
=== Writing ===
Series creator David Levy explained the premise of the show to syndicated columnist Erskine Johnson in August 1964: "We have made [the family] full-bodied people, not monsters... They are not grotesque and hideous manifestations. At the same time we are protecting the images of [Charles] Addams' 'children', as he refers to them. We are living up to the spirit of his cartoons. He is more than just a cartoonist. He's a social commentator and a great wit". Prominently depicting Thing and Cousin Itt was an example of how the show deemphasized the cartoons' dark themes and emphasized the Addams's comedic strangeness. The tone was set by series producer Nat Perrin, who was a close friend of Groucho Marx's and writer of several Marx Brothers films. Perrin created story ideas, directed one episode, and rewrote every script. The series often employed the same type of zany satire and screwball humor seen in the Marx Brothers films, in addition to wordplay, physical comedy, and occasionally slapstick. One running gag labeled people who were not members of the family as "strange" or complained of their behavior. Another one was members of the family trading objects when they collided; in "Cousin Itt and the Vocational Counselor", Gomez ends up with Morticia's knitting and Morticia has his cigar. Other running jokes were about strange food and drink, e.g. toadstools and hemlock; bats, the dungeon, the cemetery, and other "creepy" things; and Gomez's glee at losing money on the stock market. It lampooned politics ("Gomez, the Politician" and "Gomez, the People's Choice"); modern art ("Art and the Addams Family" and Morticia's painting in several episodes); Shakespeare and other literature ("My Fair Cousin Itt", and other episodes); the legal system ("The Addams Family in Court"); royalty ("Morticia Meets Royalty"); rock n' roll and Beatlemania ("Lurch, the Teenage Idol").

The Victorian residence at 21 Chester Place in the West Adams District served as the primary basis for the Addams Family Mansion featured in the 1964 television series. Built in 1888, the house was used for exterior shots only in the first episode and in the series’ opening title sequence. The real structure was two stories high; for the series, a 30-by-40-inch photograph of the building was altered by a painter to add a third floor and a gothic tower. Although the Hall of Languages building at Syracuse University also served as creative inspiration for the fictional mansion, the physical reference for the televised exterior was the Chester Place residence. Over its lifetime, the house changed ownership several times, eventually becoming part of Mount St. Mary’s College. It was later demolished to make way for a recreational track.

The Addams Family debuted at the same time as The Munsters, another black-and-white, macabre-themed family sitcom. To distinguish themselves from the competition, both shows avoided casting guest stars. John Astin argued in interviews that the two shows are fundamentally different, since the Munsters were physically monsters, but completely normal in every other respect, whereas the Addamses were normal looking, but highly eccentric. Despite this, the general public perceived the two shows as virtually interchangeable, and has continued to do so in the decades since they were both cancelled.

While Charles Addams enjoyed the royalties from the show, and loved the theme song, he thought that the characters were "half as evil" as the cartoons. Addams rarely watched the show because he was usually away from home on Friday nights.

=== Opening theme ===
The ABC network originally wanted to save money by using prerecorded library production music for the series, but producer David Levy insisted on hiring longtime Hollywood composer Vic Mizzy. The show's theme, written and arranged by Mizzy, is dominated by a harpsichord and a bass clarinet. Mizzy first improvised the iconic finger snaps when he presented his composition for approval, they worked so well they became part of the percussive accompaniment. Ted Cassidy punctuated the lyrics with the words "neat", "sweet", and "petite". Mizzy's theme was released by RCA Victor as a 45-rpm single, although it failed to chart in the U.S. The song was revived for the 1992 animated series, as well as in 2007 for a series of Addams Family television commercials for M&M's chocolates.

When The Addams Family was first brought to the big screen, the studio was not going to use the theme. Audience tests proved that the appeal was too great to delete it. It was also revisited in the dance scene in Addams Family Values.

The closing theme is similar, but is instrumental and features such instruments as a triangle, a woodblock, a siren whistle, and a duck call replacing some of the finger snaps.

== Broadcast syndication ==
The show has aired worldwide. In the United Kingdom, it aired on ITV from 1965 to 1966, on Channel 4 on Friday evenings from 1984 to 1985, and on Sky 1 from 1991 to 1992. It was aired on BBC Two at 6 pm on Monday nights from February 1992 until the end of 1993, on Saturdays in 1994, and later during school summer holidays before leaving the air at the end of August 1996.

In October 2011, the series was picked up by Cartoon Network's sister channel Boomerang and ran from October of that year for Halloween alongside The Munsters until Halloween 2013. It aired on select local stations and on Antenna TV until December 30, 2017.

As of May 2021, the show also aired on MeTV.

== Home media ==
MGM Home Entertainment (distributed by 20th Century Fox Home Entertainment) has released The Addams Family on DVD in Region 1, 2 and 4 in three-volume sets.

DVD name	Episodes	Release date	Additional information
Volume 1	22	August 10, 2006	Audio commentary for "The Addams Family Goes to School" by cast members Lisa Loring, Ken Weatherwax, and Felix Silla, along with Stephen Cox (author of The Addams Chronicles); You Rang, Mr. Addams featurette; Snap, Snap featurette; Theme Song Karaoke; The DVD releases contain alterations to the episodes "Halloween with the Addams Family" and "The Addams Family Meets the Undercover Man". In two scenes, Morticia's song "It's So Nice to Have a 'Thing' Around the House" (to the tune of "It's So Nice to Have a Man Around the House") was cut. The edits were made because MGM/20th Century Fox could not obtain the rights to the original song.
Volume 2	21	March 27, 2007	Mad About the Addams featurette: Experts discuss the history and impact of the show; Thing and Cousin Itt commentaries; Guest Star Séance interactive featurette: A magical crystal ball conjures guest star clips and trivia; Tombstone Trivia on "Morticia's Romance, Part 1" episode; Audio commentary with The Addams Chronicles author Stephen Cox
Volume 3	21	September 11, 2007	Thing and Cousin Itt commentaries; Audio commentary with Stephen Cox, author of The Addams Chronicles; Tombstone Trivia on "Cat Addams" episode
The Complete Series	64	November 13, 2007	Special "velvet-touch" package

=== Streaming ===
As of April 2019, the series can be purchased on iTunes, and can be streamed in the United States via Amazon Video and IMDb. The minisodes are available on Crackle and Vudu. The show also has a dedicated channel on Pluto TV.

=== Soundtrack ===
A soundtrack album was released in 1965 containing all of Vic Mizzy's compositions for the series entitled Original Music from The Addams Family.

== Reception ==
Contemporary reception and ratings

During its first 1964–1966 season, The Addams Family built a repeat audience and registered small Nielsen ratings, finishing its debut season in the lower twenties of the season chart; contemporary trade reports and later analyses note that its offbeat tone set it apart from more typical sitcoms of the period. Contemporary reactions were mixed, with some critics praising the show's graphic flair and comic humor and others indulging its ghastly domestic farce as a conceit. Television historian David Marc argued more recently that the show's subversion of suburban conventions can be read as "a cleverly disguised commentary on postwar conformity masquerading as family comedy." Revived interest following the early-1990s film spin-offs resulted in favorable reappreciations in the leading publications, which celebrated the show's innovation and its influence upon later genre-bending comedies.

== Reunions, sequels and adaptations ==
In 1972, the third episode of the Saturday morning animated series The New Scooby-Doo Movies featured the Addams Family. Astin, Jones, Coogan, and Cassidy all reprised their roles; 11-year-old Jodie Foster provided the voice of Pugsley. This episode was the pilot for the 1973 animated series. Coogan and Cassidy were the only original series cast members who returned for this series. Jodie Foster also returned as the voice of Pugsley.

A reunion TV film, Halloween with the New Addams Family, aired on NBC in October 1977 and starred all of the original cast, except for Blossom Rock, who was very ill at the time and was replaced as Grandmama by Phyllis actress Jane Rose. Elvia Allman portrayed Mother Frump, whom Margaret Hamilton had played in the original series. Veteran character actors Parley Baer and Vito Scotti, who both had recurring roles in the original series, also appeared in the movie. The film also included extended family members created specifically for this production, such as Gomez's brother Pancho (played by Henry Darrow) and two additional children, Wednesday Jr. and Pugsley Jr. The latter two were portrayed as near copies of the original children, now known as Wednesday Sr. and Pugsley Sr., who were once again played respectively by Lisa Loring and Ken Weatherwax, the original Wednesday and Pugsley in the series. Vic Mizzy rewrote and conducted the series theme as an instrumental.

Astin reprised his role as Gomez Addams for the 1992 animated adaptation of the series. Weatherwax and Loring, the only other original cast members still living at the time, did not participate.

In 1998, a standalone film, Addams Family Reunion, aired on the Fox Family Channel, followed by the series The New Addams Family that ran from 1998 to 2000. Astin appeared in the series as Grandpapa Addams.

== Cultural impact and legacy ==
The Addams Family has become a perennial cultural reference point in American popular culture, influencing the way offbeat families, suburban satire, and morbid comedy are depicted decades later. A 2022 feature piece for Smithsonian Magazine explained that the show "helped normalize the weird," allowing dark humor to become a form of family-friendly satire that challenged conformity and domestic idealism standards in the 1960s. The National Endowment for the Arts further reported that the series' combination of Gothic architecture and good-natured humor gave rise to a cultural icon—the "lovable oddball family"—that went on to influence programs such as The Munsters and Beetlejuice. The NEA credited the show with inventing "Halloween iconography" and setting an example for the spooky-but-wholesome tone prevalent in subsequent reinterpretations. Critics of the modern Gothic have argued that the self-consciously stylized set design, deadpan acting, and comic take on macabre subject matter in the series contributed to a media trend that blended horror aesthetics with affectionate parody, a trend addressed in more recent Gothic scholarship and media studies literature.

== In other media ==
=== Films ===
A successful film, The Addams Family, was released by Paramount Pictures in 1991, starring Raul Julia as Gomez, Anjelica Huston as Morticia, Christopher Lloyd as an amnesiac Uncle Fester, and Christina Ricci as Wednesday. After the film's release, series creator David Levy filed a lawsuit against Paramount Pictures; the suit was settled out of court. A sequel, Addams Family Values, followed in 1993, to greater critical success than the first film, though it earned less at the box office. Addams Family Reunion was a direct-to-video release in 1998 that was released by Warner Home Video. In 2019 and 2021, Metro-Goldwyn-Mayer released two animated films titled The Addams Family and The Addams Family 2, respectively.

=== Music ===
The Addams Family characters have been featured in multiple adaptations, including feature films, animated series, and stage productions. A musical adaptation of The Addams Family premiered on Broadway at the Lunt-Fontanne Theatre on April 8, 2010, following 35 preview performances that began on March 8. The production was directed and designed by Phelim McDermott and Julian Crouch, with music and lyrics by Andrew Lippa and a book by Marshall Brickman and Rick Elice. The original Broadway cast included Nathan Lane as Gomez and Bebe Neuwirth as Morticia. The show ran for 722 performances before closing on December 31, 2011.
