= Stephen Cox (American writer) =

American author

- Born: Stephen L. Cox; January 26, 1966 (age 60)
- Education: Park College
- Occupation: Freelance writer

Stephen L. Cox (born January 26, 1966) is an American freelance writer. He is the author of more than twenty books specializing in popular culture, film and television, including The Three Stooges, I Dream of Jeannie, The Munsters, The Addams Family and The Beverly Hillbillies. He is best known for his 1989 tribute to The Wizard of Oz entitled The Munchkins Remember. Cox is a 1988 graduate of Park University.

== Publications ==
Cox's 2006 coffee-table biography of Three Stooges member Larry Fine, entitled One Fine Stooge: Larry Fine's Frizzy Life in Pictures, has received acclaim from fans of the enduring comedy team. Culling materials from Fine's personal archives, including hundreds of unpublished photographs, the project remains the definitive account of the middle Stooge. Cox co-wrote the book with author Jim Terry.

He has written for TV Guide, The Hollywood Reporter, US magazine, and has contributed feature stories to Los Angeles Times. Raised in St. Louis, Missouri, Cox graduated from Park College (now Park University) and has been interviewed on programs such as CNN and Biography.

== Selected publications ==
- "The Beverly Hillbillies" Foreword by Buddy Ebsen [Contemporary Books, 1988] {ISBN 0-8092-4504-3}
- "The Beverly Hillbillies: From the Small Screen to the Big Screen The Complete Guide to America's All-Time Favorite Show" Foreword by Buddy Ebsen [HarperPerennial, 1993] {ISBN 0-06-097565-2}
- The Beverly Hillbillies: A Fortieth Anniversary Wing Ding (Contemporary Books, 1988) ISBN 1-58182-302-9
- The Munchkins Remember: The Wizard of Oz and Beyond (E. P. Dutton, 1989), ISBN 0-525-48486-8, 86 pp.
- The Addams Chronicles: Everything You Ever Wanted to Know about the Addams Family (Harper, 1991), ISBN 0-06-096897-4
- "The Addams Chronicles: An Altogether Ooky Look at The Addams Family" Foreword by John Astin [Cumberland House, 1998] ISBN 1-888952-91-1
- "Here's Johnny: Thirty Years of America's Favorite Late night Entertainment" [Harmony Books, 1992] {ISBN 0-517-58930-3]
- Here's Johnny! (Crown Books, 1992; revised edition by Cumberland House, 2002) ISBN 1-58182-265-0
- The Munchkins of Oz (Cumberland House, 1996) ISBN 1-888952-04-0, 209 pp.: 3rd edition, revised and updated, Cumberland, 2002, ISBN 1-58182-269-3, 225 pp. OCLC 49492980
- Cooking in Oz, by Elaine Willingham and Steve Cox (Cumberland, 1999) ISBN 1-58182-051-8
- Dreaming of Jeannie: TV's Primetime in a Bottle (St. Martin's Press, 2000), ISBN 0-312-20417-5 – as "Steve Cox"
- It's a Wonderful Life: A Memory Book (Cumberland House, 2003) ISBN 1-58182-337-1
- The Munsters: A Trip Down Mockingbird Lane (Watson-Guptill / Backstage Books, 2006) ISBN 0-8230-7894-9
- One Fine Stooge: Larry Fine’s Frizzy Life in Pictures, with Jim Terry [Cumberland House, 2006) ISBN 1-58182-363-0
- "The Official Abbott & Costello Scrapbook" with John Lofflin [ Contemporary Books, 1990] ISBN 0-8092-4180-3
- "The Abbott & Costello Story: Sixty Years of 'Who's on First?'" with John Lofflin [Cumberland House, 1997] ISBN 1-888952-61-X
- "The Incredible Mr. Don Knotts: An Eye-Popping Look at His Movies" with Kevin Marhanka [Cumberland House, 2008] ISBN 978-1-58182-658-6
- "Here on Gilligan's Isle" with Russell Johnson [HarperCollins, 1993] ISBN 0-06-096993-8
- "Short and Sweet: The Life and Times of the Lollipop Munchkin" with Jerry Maren [Cumberland House, 2008] ISBN 978-1-58182-543-5
