= Julie Payne (actress, born 1940) =

American actress (1940–2019)

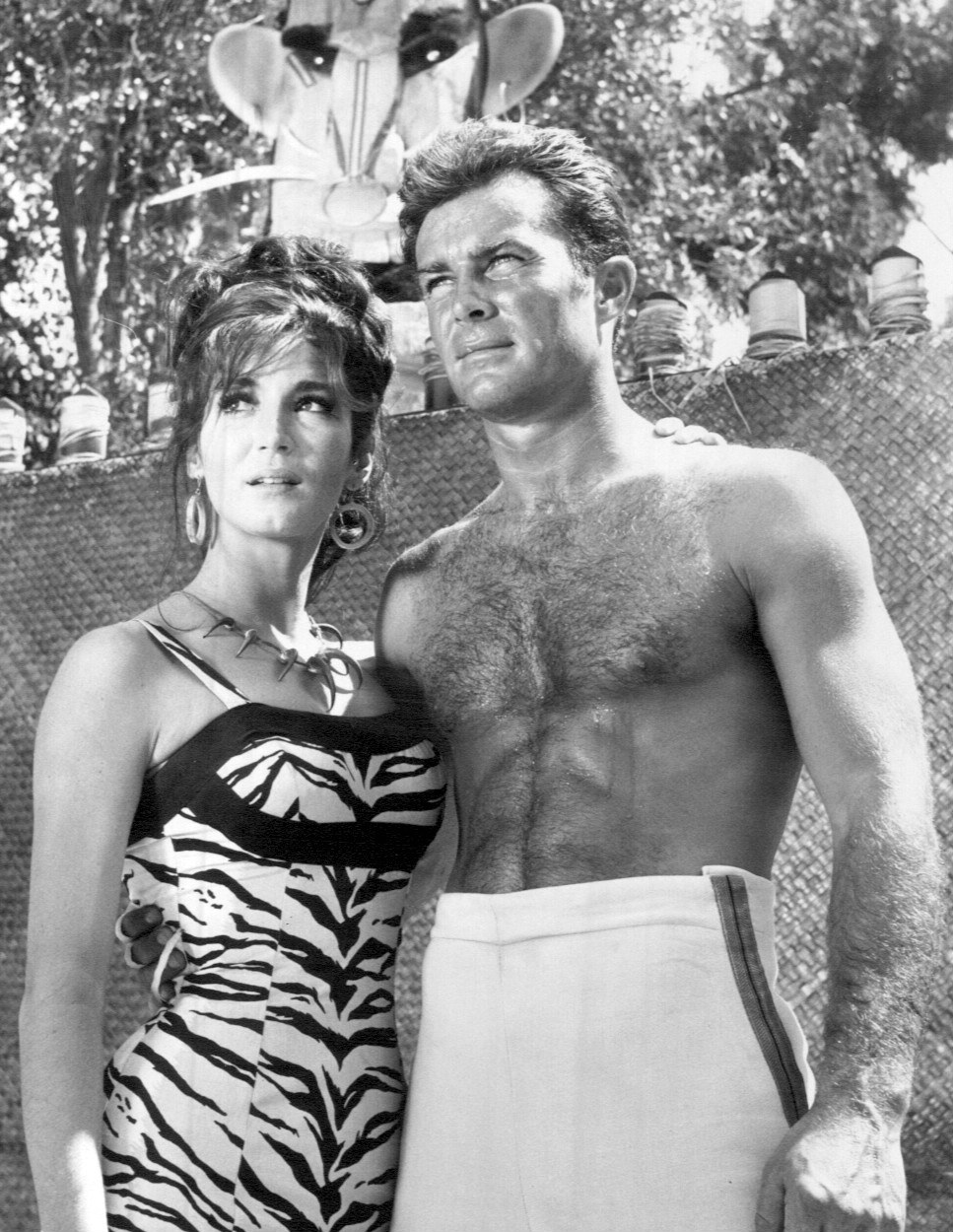
- Payne and Robert Conrad in The Wild Wild West, 1966
- Born: Julie Anne Payne; July 10, 1940; Los Angeles, California, U.S.
- Died: June 7, 2019 (aged 78); Los Angeles, California, U.S.
- Occupation: Actress
- Years active: 1959–1967
- Known for: Island of the Blue Dolphins; Don't Make Waves
- Spouses: Skip Ward (m. 1964; div. 1965); Robert Towne (m. 1977; div. 1982)
- Partner: Steve Luckman (1999-her death)
- Children: 1
- Parent(s): John Payne; Anne Shirley

Julie Anne Payne (July 10, 1940 – June 7, 2019) was an American actress who appeared in television and films from 1959 to 1967.

== Early life ==
A native of Los Angeles, Julie Anne Payne was the daughter of John Payne, film and television leading man of the 1930s, 1940s, and 1950s, and Anne Shirley, who started as a child actress in the late silent-early talkie period and became an ingenue and, later, leading lady of the late 1930s and early 1940s. They were married from 1937 to 1943; Julie was their only child together. After the divorce, Payne lived with her mother, but her father "was never very far away at any time". She dropped the last letter from her middle name to become Julie Ann Payne. She has two half-brothers and a half sister, and she attended Beverly Hills High School.

== Career ==
Starting an eight-year television and film career, she made her debut at the age of 18 as the sole female in "The Pawn", the April 6, 1959 installment of her father's 1957–59 NBC Western series, The Restless Gun, and subsequently appeared in episodes of One Step Beyond ("Premonition", seen on March 10, 1959, one month before the broadcast of her Restless Gun performance), Alfred Hitchcock Presents ("Graduating Class", December 27, 1959), The Tab Hunter Show ("I Love a Marine", October 30, 1960) and Dobie Gillis ("Goodbye, Mr. Pomfritt, Hello, Mr. Chips", June 13, 1961).

Her film appearances consisted of uncredited bits in the 1962 classic, The Manchurian Candidate, and Elvis Presley's 1965 musical, Girl Happy, as well as small credited supporting roles in 1964's Island of the Blue Dolphins and 1967's Don't Make Waves.

Her final two television performances were broadcast two days apart in 1965. On October 6 she was seen in "The Young Marauders", the fourth episode of ABC's new color Western series, The Big Valley, playing the Southern-accented companion of the handsome head marauder, and, on October 8, in "The Night of Sudden Death", the fourth episode of CBS' new black-and-white (in color, starting with the 1966–67 season) Western/spy/fantasy series, The Wild Wild West. Playing a fiery and seductive member of a mysterious troupe of traveling circus performers, she was prominently featured amidst the supporting cast and left the small screen on a high note.

Following a two-year break from acting, her one remaining credit, Don't Make Waves, a comedic satire on southern California beach lifestyle, which starred Tony Curtis, Claudia Cardinale, and Sharon Tate, spotlighted her in a brief bit as a beach beauty.

== Personal life ==
Payne married actor Skip Ward in Las Vegas in 1964 and they divorced the following year. In 1969, Payne met Academy Award-winning screenwriter Robert Towne; they married in 1977 and divorced in 1982. Their daughter, Katharine Towne (b. 1978), began a career as an actress in 1998 and has appeared in numerous films and TV series. In 1999, Payne reconnected with her high school sweetheart, Steve Luckman, and they were together until her death.

Payne died at the age of 78 in June 2019 from chronic obstructive pulmonary disease.

== Filmography ==
Year	Title	Role	Notes
1959	Alfred Hitchcock Presents	Connie	Episode: "Graduating Class"
1962	The Manchurian Candidate	Party Guest	Uncredited
1964	Honeymoon Hotel	Mrs. Harrison	Uncredited
1964	Island of the Blue Dolphins	Lurai	
1965	Girl Happy	Girl #1	Uncredited
1967	Don't Make Waves	Helen	
