= Hal Jon Norman =

American film, radio and television actor

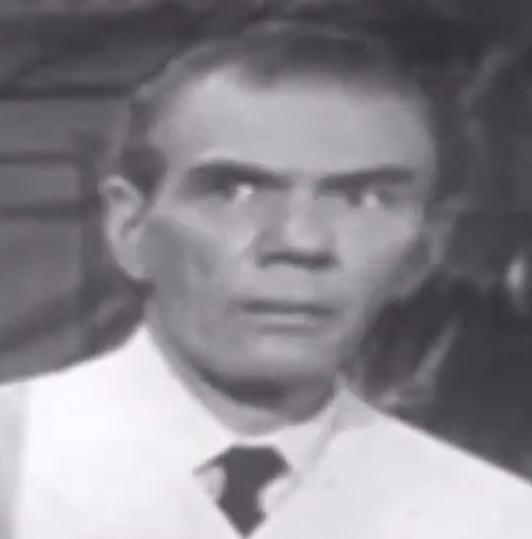
- Norman in Lock-Up, 1961
- Born: Hal Leslie Norman; August 27, 1911; Wichita, Kansas, U.S.
- Died: July 14, 2011 (aged 99); Andover, Kansas, U.S.
- Occupations: Film, radio and television actor

Hal Leslie Norman (August 27, 1911 – July 14, 2011) was an American film, radio and television actor.

== Life and career ==
Norman was born in Wichita, Kansas. At the age of nineteen, he lost his right leg in a train accident, and walked with a prosthetic leg. He began his radio career in the late 1930s, appearing in numerous radio plays. During his radio career, he was an announcer at KFH Radio in Wichita, Kansas. He then began his screen career in 1957, appearing in the syndicated anthology television series Studio 57. In 1958, he appeared in the western television programs Tales of Wells Fargo, Wagon Train and The Restless Gun.

Later in his career, Norman guest-starred in television programs including Bonanza, Lassie, Death Valley Days, Rawhide, Lost in Space, The Tall Man, The Wild Wild West and Daniel Boone. In 1964, he starred as Kimki in the film Island of the Blue Dolphins, starring along with Celia Kaye, Larry Domasin, Ann Daniel, Carlos Romero and George Kennedy. He appeared in films such as Emperor of the North Pole and The Loners.

Norman retired from acting in 1990, last appearing in the film Jezebel's Kiss.

== Death ==
Norman died on July 14, 2011, in Andover, Kansas, at the age of 99.
