= Run of the House =

American TV series

- intertitle of Run of the House
- Genre: Sitcom
- Created by: Betsy Thomas
- Starring: Kyle Howard; Sasha Barrese; Margo Harshman; Mo Gaffney; Joseph Lawrence
- Composer: Ed Alton
- Country of origin: United States
- Original language: English
- No. of seasons: 1
- No. of episodes: 19 (3 unaired)

Production
- Executive producers: Prudence Fraser; Robert Sternin; Eric Tannenbaum; Kim Tannenbaum; Betsy Thomas; Mark Hentemann
- Running time: 30 minutes
- Production companies: The Tannenbaum Company; 2 Out Rally Productions; Warner Bros. Television

Original release
- Network: The WB
- Release: September 11, 2003 – May 7, 2004

Run of the House is an American sitcom television series created by Betsy Thomas that aired on the WB between September 11, 2003, and May 7, 2004. Nineteen episodes were produced, but only sixteen were aired before the show was canceled. The show was about a family of four siblings whose parents moved from Grand Rapids, Michigan, to Arizona because the weather would be better there for their father's health, but they left the mostly grown children to stay in their old house and look after themselves, with the 3 eldest siblings also having to deal with raising their 15-year-old sister, Brooke. There is also a nosy neighbor named Mrs. Norris who often pops in unannounced to check up on them.

== Cast ==
- Kyle Howard as Chris Franklin
- Sasha Barrese as Sally Franklin, the younger sister of Chris
- Margo Harshman as Brooke Franklin, the youngest sister of Chris
- Mo Gaffney as Marilyn Norris, the neighbor of Franklin
- Joseph Lawrence as Kurt Franklin, the older brother of Chris

== Episodes ==
No.	Title	Directed by	Written by	Original release date	Prod. code	Viewers (millions)
1	"Pilot"	David Trainer	Betsy Thomas	September 11, 2003	177201	2.50
2	"Kiss and Tell"	Robert Berlinger	Tom Purcell	September 18, 2003	177202	2.70
3	"The Party"	Robert Berlinger	Betsy Thomas	September 25, 2003	177203	1.72
4	"'Twas the Night Before Homecoming"	Robert Berlinger	Mark Hentemann	October 2, 2003	177204	2.28
5	"When There's Smoke, There's Fire"	Robert Berlinger	Theresa Mulligan	October 9, 2003	177205	1.90
6	"Chris Gets a Job"	Robert Berlinger	Frank Lombardi	October 16, 2003	177206	2.09
7	"Just Like Mom"	Robert Berlinger	Chrissy Pietrosh & Jessica Goldstein	October 23, 2003	177207	2.06
8	"Chris's College Friends"	Robert Berlinger	Theresa Mulligan	October 30, 2003	177208	2.15
9	"Sally's New Boss"	Peter Marc Jacobson	Frank Lombardi	November 6, 2003	177209	1.98
10	"The Education of Chris Franklin"	David Trainer	Douglas Lieblein	November 13, 2003	177210	2.07
11	"Forbidden Fruit"	Peter Marc Jacobson	Mark Hentemann & Tom Purcell	November 20, 2003	177211	1.99
12	"The Fighting Irish"	Gerry Cohen	Will Benson	January 8, 2004	177212	1.64
13	"Drive My Car"	Gerry Cohen	Story by : Joel Church-Cooper; Teleplay by : Tom Purcell & Theresa Mulligan	January 15, 2004	177213	1.76
14	"Undercover Brother"	Gerry Cohen	Chrissy Pietrosh & Jessica Goldstein	April 23, 2004	177214	2.02
15	"Sixteen"	Gail Mancuso	Chrissy Pietrosh & Jessica Goldstein	April 30, 2004	177216	1.99
16	"Signs"	Gerry Cohen	Story by : Lois Thomas; Teleplay by : Betsy Thomas	May 7, 2004	177218	2.09
17	"Boy Toy"	Gail Mancuso	Robert Sternin	Unaired	177215	N/A
18	"The Unnatural"	Gail Mancuso	Wil Berson	Unaired	177219	N/A
19	"There's Something About Sally"	N/A	Douglas Lieblein	Unaired	177217	N/A
