= Island of the Blue Dolphins (film) =

1964 film by James B. Clark

- Theatrical release poster
- Directed by: James B. Clark
- Screenplay by: Jane Klove; Ted Sherdeman
- Based on: Island of the Blue Dolphins by Scott O'Dell
- Produced by: Robert B. Radnitz
- Starring: Celia Kaye; Larry Domasin; Ann Daniel; Carlos Romero; George Kennedy; Hal Jon Norman
- Cinematography: Leo Tover
- Edited by: Ted J. Kent
- Music by: Paul Sawtell
- Production company: Universal Pictures
- Distributed by: Universal Pictures
- Release date: July 3, 1964
- Running time: 93 minutes
- Country: United States
- Language: English

Island of the Blue Dolphins is a 1964 American adventure film directed by James B. Clark and written by Jane Klove and Ted Sherdeman. It is based on the 1960 novel Island of the Blue Dolphins by Scott O'Dell. The film stars Celia Kaye, Larry Domasin, Ann Daniel, Carlos Romero, George Kennedy and Hal Jon Norman. The film was released on July 3, 1964, by Universal Pictures.

The producer and director had previously collaborated on A Dog of Flanders and Misty.

The film was shot in Gualala, California.

== Plot ==
In 1835, a ship crewed by Russian fur hunters and Aleuts come to an island off the coast of Southern California to hunt sea otters. They make a deal with the Nicoleño people living in the village of Ghalas-at for permission to hunt on their lands, but later try to leave without paying. The hunters are then confronted by the village chief and respond with violence. In the ensuing skirmish most of the Nicoleños are slain, forcing the survivors to flee the island. Young Karana, realizing that her 6-year-old brother, Ramo, has been left behind, returns to the island. Karana and Ramo are left alone, menaced by a pack of wild dogs. The most ferocious of the dogs kills Ramo, and Karana teaches herself archery and hunts the dog. She puts an arrow in its chest but then takes pity on the animal and nurses it back to health.

She and the dog, whom she names Rontu, become fast friends. When another group of hunters come to the island, Karana hides, and although Tutok, a girl in the group, finds her and tries to befriend her, Karana refuses to trust anyone. Years pass, and Rontu dies of age. Karana finds a wild dog, that looks like Rontu, and names him Rontu-Aru which means son of Rontu. Later, a boat carrying a missionary arrives, and this time Karana decides to trust the strangers. Taking her animals, Rontu-Aru and some wild birds she has taught to never leave her, she leaves the island.

== Cast ==
- Celia Kaye as Karana
- Larry Domasin as Ramo
- Ann Daniel as Tutok
- Carlos Romero as Chowig
- George Kennedy as Aleut Captain
- Hal Jon Norman as Kimki
- Julie Payne as Lurai
- Martin Garralaga as The Priest
- Junior as Rontu

== See also ==
- Il'mena
