= Sasha Barrese =

American actress and poker player (born 1981)

- Born: Alexandra Barrese; April 24, 1981 (age 45); Maui, Hawaii, U.S.
- Occupations: Actress, professional poker player
- Years active: 1989–2013
- Children: 2

Alexandra Barrese (born April 24, 1981) better known as Sasha Barrese is an American retired actress and professional poker player. She is best known for her role as Tracy Billings in The Hangover Trilogy.

== Early life ==
Barrese was born on April 24, 1981, in Maui, Hawaii, to Katherine, a single mother. They moved to Paris, France where her mother worked as a model, returning to the United States in 1985. Her modeling career began during her school years for agencies including NEXT and Elite.

== Career ==
Barrese and her mother had their acting debut in the 1989 comedy film Homer and Eddie. The following year they appeared as the younger and older versions of the title character in the drama film Jezebel's Kiss. In all subsequent roles, she is credited as "Sasha Barrese".

As an adult, Barrese had small roles in American Pie (1999), Hellraiser: Inferno (2000) and Legally Blonde (2001). She appeared as Tess in three episodes of the comedy television series Just Shoot Me!, before landing her first lead role on the WB sitcom Run of the House. She portrayed Sally Franklin, one of four siblings left to fend for themselves when their parents relocate to Arizona. She then appeared as Caitlin Mansfield in the television drama series LAX set in the airport of the same name. She also appeared in episodes of Drive; Supernatural; Roommates; CSI: Miami; Trauma; Robot Chicken; and Leverage. She had roles in the films The Hangover, The Hangover Part II, and The Hangover Part III, portraying Tracy Billings. She also appeared in the 2010 horror film Let Me In.

== Personal life ==
Barrese began playing draw poker, backgammon, gin and chess at an early age, saying "I'm Russian, so I've been playing games my whole life". She announced her plans to become a professional poker player in May 2014. She has competed in several tournaments, including the World Series of Poker (WSOP) in Las Vegas in 2014.

As of September 2020, Barrese has just under $120,000 in live tournament earnings, made in 31 different events over the course of seven years, and cashing in five WSOP events and six WSOP series events. She also engages in private cash games in Hollywood.

== Filmography ==
Film roles
Year	Title	Role	Notes
1989	Homer and Eddie	4-year-old girl	
1990	Jezebel's Kiss	Young Jezebel	as Alexandra Barrese
1999	American Pie	Courtney	
2000	Dropping Out	Heather	
2000	Hellraiser: Inferno	Daphne Sharp	Direct-to-video
2001	Legally Blonde	Another Girl	
2002	The Ring	Girl Teen #1	
2007	Full Dress	Nun 1	Short film
2008	The More Things Change...	Madeline Stone	
2009	The Hangover	Tracy Garner/Tracy Billings	
2010	Let Me In	Virginia	
2011	The Hangover Part II	Tracy Billings	
2013	The Hangover Part III	Tracy Billings	

Television roles
Year	Title	Role	Notes
1999	Boy Meets World	Janine	Episode: "No Such Thing as a Sure Thing"
2001	Undressed	Lindsey	4 episodes
2002	Paranormal Girl	Kelly Billingham	Unsold television pilot
2002	Just Shoot Me	Tess	3 episodes
2003–2004	Run of the House	Sally Franklin	Main role, 18 episodes
2004–2005	LAX	Caitlin Mansfield	Recurring role, 9 episodes
2006	CSI: Miami	April Goodwin	Episode: "Shock"
2007	Drive	Dupree	Episode: "Let the Games Begin"
2007	Carpoolers	Holly	Episode: "Laird of the Rings"
2007	Supernatural	Casey	Episode: "Sin City"
2009	Roommates	Jenny	Episode: "The Set-Up"
2010	Trauma	Christine	Episode: "Tunnel Vision"
2010	Robot Chicken	Virgin Mary / Kate McCallister / Girl	Episode: "Robot Chicken's DP Christmas Special"
2012	Leverage	Barbara Madsen	Episode: "The Gold Job"
