= The Tall Man (TV series) =

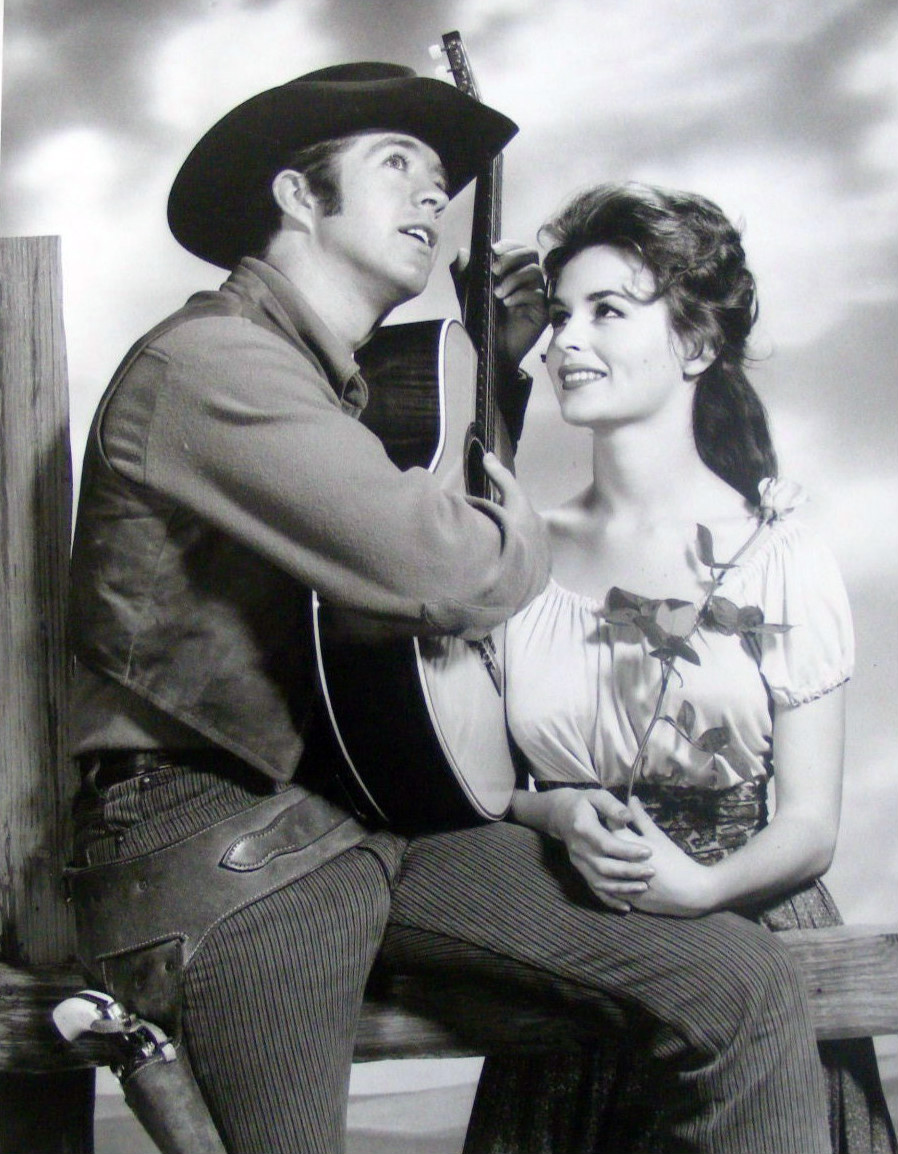
- Clu Gulager as Billy the Kid and Marianna Hill as Rita
- Genre: Western
- Created by: Samuel A. Peeples
- Written by: Arthur Browne, Jr.; D. C. Fontana; David Lang; Paul King; Samuel A. Peeples; Frank Price; Barry Shipman
- Directed by: Tay Garnett; Sidney Lanfield; Sydney Pollack; Lesley Selander; William Witney
- Starring: Barry Sullivan; Clu Gulager
- Country of origin: United States
- Original language: English
- No. of seasons: 2
- No. of episodes: 75

Production
- Executive producer: Nat Holt
- Producers: Edward Montagne; Samuel A. Peeples; Frank Price
- Running time: 30 minutes
- Production companies: Lincoln County Production Company; Revue Studios

Original release
- Network: NBC
- Release: September 10, 1960 – May 26, 1962

The Tall Man is a half-hour American Western television series about Sheriff Pat Garrett and gunfighter Billy the Kid that aired on NBC from September 10, 1960, to September 1, 1962, filmed by Revue Productions.

Created and produced by Samuel Peeples, the series is set in New Mexico in the late 1870s and also depicts other figures of the period, such as John Tunstall and Lew Wallace.

Sponsors included Beech-Nut Life Savers.

== Synopsis ==
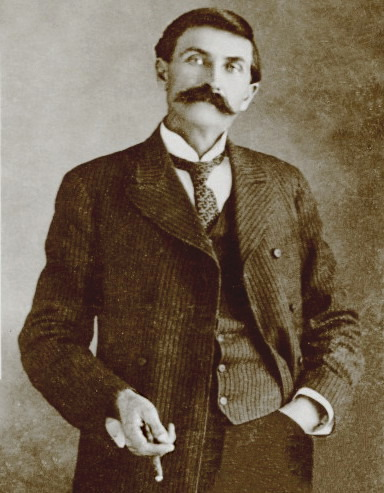
The real Pat Garrett

The Tall Man stars 6 ft 3 in (1.91 m) Barry Sullivan as Sheriff Pat Garrett, and Clu Gulager as Billy the Kid.

In the premiere episode, "Garrett and the Kid" (September 10, 1960), Garrett arrives in Lincoln (depicted in the series as a gold-mining boomtown) as its new deputy sheriff. He learns that a crooked saloon owner, Paul Mason (Robert Middleton), dominates the community, including the marshal, Dave Leggert (Denver Pyle). When Mason sees his power threatened, Mason tries to hire Billy to kill Garrett, unaware that the two were then on friendly terms. Vaughn Taylor plays Judge Riley in this episode, and King Donovan appears as a Mason henchman.

Marianna Hill was cast in several episodes as one of Billy's girlfriends, Rita. In one episode, Robert Lansing played the frontier dentist, gambler, and gunfighter John H. "Doc" Holliday in the episode "Rovin' Gambler."

== Cast ==
- Barry Sullivan as Sheriff Pat Garrett
- Clu Gulager as Billy the Kid.

Andy Clyde was cast in five episodes as Pa McBeam; Judy Nugent plays McBean's daughter, June. Different actresses were cast as the other daughter, May. Olive Sturgess played the part of May in "McBean Rides Again" (Nº 13), "The Reluctant Bridegroom" (Nº 23), and "Millionaire McBean" (Nº 31). Andy Clyde also appeared at the time in the role of the neighboring farmer George MacMichael on ABC's The Real McCoys, starring Walter Brennan.

=== Other guest stars ===
In addition to the aforementioned, other actors appearing on The Tall Man in individual episodes include:

- Claude Akins
- Chris Alcaide
- John Anderson
- R.G. Armstrong
- Malcolm Atterbury
- Patricia Barry
- Don Beddoe
- Russ Bender
- Lyle Bettger
- Lane Bradford
- Jocelyn Brando
- Hank Brandt
- X Brands
- Wally Brown
- Edgar Buchanan
- Michael Burns
- Robert Burton
- Harry Carey, Jr.
- Alan Carney
- Paul Carr
- John Cliff
- James Coburn
- Iron Eyes Cody
- Jim Davis
- Cyril Delevanti
- Richard Devon
- Pamela Duncan
- Faith Domergue
- Jena Engstrom
- William Fawcett
- Mona Freeman
- Robert Griffin
- Herman Hack
- Chick Hannan
- Ron Harper
- Don C. Harvey
- Raymond Hatton
- Michael Hinn
- Rex Holman
- Rodolfo Hoyos Jr.
- Clegg Hoyt
- Kathleen Hughes
- Tommy Ivo
- Richard Jaeckel
- I. Stanford Jolley
- Ray Kellogg
- Sandy Kenyon
- Michael Landon
- Nan Leslie
- Herbert Lytton
- Adele Mara
- John McKee
- Howard McNear
- Don Megowan
- Jan Merlin
- Mark Miller
- Vic Morrow
- Gregory Morton
- Leonard Nimoy
- Hal Jon Norman
- Gregg Palmer
- James Parnell
- Dennis Patrick
- William Phipps
- Ford Rainey
- Richard Reeves
- Stafford Repp
- Addison Richards
- Julie Sommars
- George Sowards
- Harold J. Stone
- Kelly Thordsen
- Regis Toomey
- Jack Tornek
- Harry von Zell
- Ralph Votrian
- Gregory Walcott
- Patrick Waltz
- Robert J. Wilke
- Elen Willard

== Critical response ==
Jack Gould, in a review in The New York Times, called the program "a characteristic item of uninventive tripe". He described Sullivan's portrayal of Garrett as "an official who exudes sternness, physique, and no-think" and, comparing Gulager's Billy the Kid to Edd Byrnes's character on 77 Sunset Strip, as "made to resemble a Kookie of the sagebrush".

== Episode list ==
=== Season 1: 1960–61 ===
No. overall	No. in season	Title	Directed by	Written by	Original release date
1	1	"Garrett and the Kid"	Herschel Daugherty	Samuel A. Peeples	September 10, 1960
2	2	"Forty-Dollar Boots"	Richard Irving	Samuel A. Peeples	September 17, 1960
3	3	"Bad Company"	Richard Irving	Samuel A. Peeples	September 24, 1960
4	4	"The Shawl"	Herschel Daugherty	Frank Price	October 1, 1960
5	5	"The Lonely Star"	Henry S. Kesler	Samuel A. Peeples	October 8, 1960
6	6	"A Bounty for Billy"	Franklin Adreon	Story by : D. C. Fontana; Teleplay by : Martin Berkeley	October 15, 1960
7	7	"The Parson"	Henry S. Kesler	D.C. Fontana Frank Price	October 29, 1960
8	8	"Night Train to Tularosa"	Franklin Adreon	Barry Shipman	November 5, 1960
9	9	"Larceny and the Ladies"	Herschel Daugherty	Frank Price	November 12, 1960
10	10	"Counterfeit Law"	Franklin Adreon	Samuel A. Peeples	November 19, 1960
11	11	"And the Beast"	Frank Arrigo	Frank Price	November 26, 1960
12	12	"Bitter Ashes"	Richard Irving	Samual A. Peeples	December 3, 1960
13	13	"McBean Rides Again"	Frank Arrigo	Frank Price	December 10, 1960
14	14	"Tiger Eye"	Franklin Adreon	D.C. Fontana	December 17, 1960
15	15	"Billy's Baby"	Franklin Adreon	Frank Price	December 24, 1960
16	16	"One of One Thousand"	Franklin Adreon	Borden Chase	December 31, 1960
17	17	"First Blood"	Franklin Adreon	Samual A. Peeples	January 7, 1961
18	18	"A Gun is for Killing"	Franklin Adreon	Samual A. Peeples	January 14, 1961
19	19	"The Grudge Fight"	Richard Irving	Cyril Hume	January 21, 1961
20	20	"The Best Policy"	Franklin Adreon	Frank Price	January 28, 1961
21	21	"The Reversed Blade"	Franklin Adreon	Peter Barry	February 4, 1961
Murray Matheson portrays Billy's employer, John Tundall, though the name of the historical person is John Tunstall. Tundall grows indignant when the con-man Ben Webster (John Archer), who stole his wife and $10,000 eight years earlier, arrives in Lincoln. Jeanne Cooper plays Tundall's former wife, now Mrs. Elmira Webster. John Tunstall died at twenty-four, but Matheson was forty-nine when he assumed the role as Billy's employer.
22	22	"Dark Moment"	William Witney	Samuel A. Peeples	February 11, 1961
23	23	"The Reluctant Bridegroom"	Lesley Selander	Frank Price	February 18, 1961
Ellen Corby is featured as Hannah Blossom, a potential mail order bride, for Pa McBeam. Hannah is lured to Lincoln through a fraudulent letter written by the McBeam daughters.
24	24	"Maria's Little Lamb"	Frank Arrigo	Barry Shipman	February 25, 1961
25	25	"Big Sam's Boy"	Leslay Selander	Tom Seller	March 4, 1961
26	26	"The Last Resource"	Richard Bartlett	Frank Price	March 11, 1961
27	27	"Rovin' Gambler"	William Witney	Samual A. Peeples	March 18, 1961
Robert Lansing is featured as Doc Holliday, falsely accused of murder by a witness to the crime, Kate Elder (Faith Domergue), who also happens to be his former lover.
28	28	"Hard Justice"	William Witney	Samuel A. Peeples	March 25, 1961
29	29	"The Legend and the Gun"	R.G. Springsteen	Samual A. Peeples	April 1, 1961
30	30	"A Kind of Courage"	R.G. Springsteen	Tom Seller	April 8, 1961
31	31	"Millionaire McBean"	William Witney	Frank Price	April 15, 1961
32	32	"A Scheme of Hearts"	R.G. Springsteen	Tom Seller	April 22, 1961
33	33	"The Cloudbusters"	R.G. Springsteen	D. C. Fontana	April 29, 1961
Frank de Kova plays Mike Gray Eagle, who sells water to Lincoln residents at inflated prices during a drought, during which the only flowing stream is on the Apache reservation.
34	34	"Ransom of a Town"	Franklin Adreon	Story by : Mark Weingart; Teleplay by : Barry Shipman	May 6, 1961
35	35	"Ladies of the Town"	Richard Barlett	Samual A. Peeples	May 20, 1961
36	36	"Death or Taxes"	Frank Arrigo	Barry Shipman	May 27, 1961
Garrett rides into a railroad company town that abuses its workers, runs illegal gambling halls, and refuses to pay its taxes. Character actor Will Wright plays Mayor Hackett in this episode, which features James Seay as Holman.
37	37	"The Great Western"	Frank Arrigo	Melton S. Gelman	June 3, 1961
Frank Ferguson plays Wallace in a story about Big Mamacita (Connie Gilchrist), the owner of a rowdy cantina outside Lincoln and her grandson, who is a Wallace aide.

=== Season 2: 1961–62 ===
No. overall	No. in season	Title	Directed by	Written by	Original release date
38	1	"Full Payment"	Lesley Selander	David Lang	September 9, 1961
39	2	"The Liberty Belle"	Tay Garnett	Les Crutchfield	September 16, 1961
Patricia Donahue portrays Elena, Pat's former girlfriend, who shows up in Lincoln, on the run from the man she left him for, Joe Durango (Chris Alcaide). This episode also marks the reunion—and final joint onscreen appearance—of 1940s comedy team Wally Brown and Alan Carney (seen here as Ethan, a local malcontent, and Wino, his perpetually soused sidekick), less than two months before Brown's death.
40	3	"Where is Sylvia?"	Sidney Landfield	Robert E. Thompson Frank Price	September 23, 1961
41	4	"The Female Artillery"	Lesley Selander	Frank Price	September 30, 1961
42	5	"Shadow of the Past"	Tay Garnett	Richard Fielder	October 7, 1961
Charles Aidman is cast as Ben Wiley, the father of Billy's newest girlfriend, Sue Wiley (Barbara Parkins). Sheriff Garrett recognizes Wiley as an informant who stopped Garrett from escaping from a Confederate prison during the American Civil War. Nancy Davis Reagan appears in this episode as Ben's wife, Sarah.
43	6	"An Item for Auction"	Sidney Landfield	Arthur Browne Jr.	October 14, 1961
44	7	"The Judas Palm"	Sidney Lanfield	David Lang	October 21, 1961
45	8	"The Woman"	Ted Post	Arthur Browne, Jr.	October 28, 1961
46	9	"Trial by Hanging"	Sidney Lanfield	Arthur Browne, Jr.	November 4, 1961
47	10	"The Leopard's Spots"	Richard Donner	Tom Seller	November 11, 1961
48	11	"Petticoat Crusade"	Richard Donner	Frank Price	November 18, 1961
49	12	"Time of Foreshadowing"	R.G. Springsteen	Robert E. Thompson	November 25, 1961
50	13	"Fool's Play"	Lesley Selander	David Lang	December 2, 1961
51	14	"The Legend of Billy"	Tay Garnett	Shimon Wincelberg	December 9, 1961
52	15	"A Tombstone for Billy"	Sidney Landfield	Thomas Thompson	December 16, 1961
53	16	"Sidekick"	Ted Post	Les Crutchfield	December 23, 1961
54	17	"Apache Daughter"	Tay Garnett	Richard Fielder	December 30, 1961
J. Pat O'Malley portrays Sam Bartlett, whose daughter, Sally (Sherry Jackson), is released from Apache captivity after nine years. However, Sally wants to return to her husband, Talano, (Anthony Hall, aka Sal Ponti) a Chiricahua warrior.
55	18	"Substitute Sheriff"	Lesley Selander	Frank Price	January 6, 1962
The McBeam daughters enlist their father as an acting sheriff in a scheme to thwart the seizure of their property for right-of-way by the railroad. Bob Hastings appears in this episode as J. S. Chase.
56	19	"The Girl from Paradise"	Edward Montagne	Richard Fielder	January 13, 1962
Billy is framed for murder by his old nemesis, Rafe Tollinger (Kelly Thordsen), the sheriff of a neighboring county. He is sent to the gallows along with Anne Drake (Pippa Scott), a pretty young woman who is also framed for murder. The two are handcuffed together but manage to escape and then must flee from an approaching posse.
57	20	"St. Louis Woman"	Sidney Lanfield	Arthur Browne, Jr.	January 20, 1962
Jan Clayton, formerly of CBS's Lassie, portrays Janet Harper, a widow engaged to marry Tom Davis (Russ Conway), a longtime friend of Sheriff Garrett. While Tom is away from Lincoln on a cattle drive, Janet begins to show a romantic interest in Garrett. Roger Mobley appears in this episode as David Harper, Janet's young son.
58	21	"The Hunt"	Lesley Selander	Paul King	January 27, 1962
A wealthy young man, Edward Van Doren (Richard Ney) hires Billy to guide him into the wilderness to kill a mountain lion. However, Van Doren's real target is Billy himself. This episode presents details about the Colt Model 1877 .41 caliber, the gun used by Billy the Kid.
59	22	"The Impatient Brides"	Edward Montagne	Frank Price	February 3, 1962
60	23	"Rio Doloroso"	Sydney Pollack	Joe Stone Paul King	February 10, 1962
61	24	"A Day to Kill"	Frank McDonald	Paul King	February 17, 1962
62	25	"Property of the Crown"	Frank McDonald	Tom Seller	February 24, 1962
63	26	"Night of the Hawk"	Tay Garnett	Richard Fielder	March 3, 1962
64	27	"Three for All"	Tay Garnett	Arthur Browne, Jr.	March 10, 1962
Irene Tedrow portrays the fiery Maw Killgore, who breaks her sons out of the Lincoln jail, where they are being held for having vandalized a saloon. The Killgores then place Garrett in his own cell while they go on a crime spree. George Kennedy plays Hyram Killgore.
65	28	"Quarantine"	Sidney Lanfield	Samuel A. Peeples	March 17, 1962
66	29	"The Four Queens"	Sidney Lanfield	Tom Seller	March 24, 1962
67	30	"The Long Way Home"	Tay Garnett	D.D. Beauchamp	March 31, 1962
68	31	"A Time to Run"	Tay Garnett	Paul King	April 7, 1962
69	32	"Trial by Fury"	Edward Montagne	Paul King	April 14, 1962
Billy receives a letter from a prospector, Johnny Red (Fuzzy Knight), informing him of the potential discovery of a lost Spanish mine near San Miguel, a ghost town, in southern New Mexico. James Griffith is cast in this episode as James Cutter and Robert Emhardt as Judge Oliver Cromwell.
70	33	"The Frame"	Edward Montagne	Margaret Armen	April 21, 1962
Harry Townes is cast as Henry Stewart, diagnosed with a fatal illness and jealous of his wife's former association with Sheriff Garrett. While mentally unbalanced from his illness, Stewart plots his own suicide and plans to frame his wife, Isobel (Lori March), for murder.
71	34	"The Runaway Groom"	Edward Montagne	Frank Price	April 28, 1962
The Tugwell Brothers seek the husband of their sister, Sally (Roberta Shore), who deserted his wife right after the marriage a year earlier. They believe Billy the Kid is the missing husband and father of Sally's baby, rather than Charlie Fox (Gary Vinson).
72	35	"The Black Robe"	R.G. Springsteen	Cyril Hume	May 5, 1962
Robert Burton plays Governor Wallace. After the fall of Emperor Maximilian, a French foreign agent is supplying arms to the Mescalero Apaches in a murky plot to reoccupy Mexico. Chief Yowlachie is cast as "The Great Chief"; Slim Pickens as Starr, and Martin Landau as Father Gueschim, a Roman Catholic priest.
73	36	"The Woman in Black"	Edward Montagne	Richard Fielder	May 12, 1962
74	37	"Doctor on Horseback"	Edward Montagne	Frank Price	May 19, 1962
Dr. Wade Parsons (Ed Nelson), who has assumed the practice of a beloved doctor who retired, must attempt to save the life of a young pregnant woman after she attempts suicide when her husband deserts her.
75	38	"Phoebe"	Sydney Pollack	David Lang	May 26, 1962
George Macready portrays Cyrus Canfield, a vengeful father searching for his runaway teenaged daughter, played by Floy Dean. When Canfield sees Billy with a necklace owned by Phoebe, he suspects that the young gunfighter may have killed his daughter. Billy, however, explains that Phoebe gave him the necklace as a gift after he rescued her in a rockslide.

== Release ==
On October 30, 2007, Timeless Media Group released fifteen episodes of the series on a Region 1 three-DVD set in the United States. On December 6, 2011, Timeless Media Group released The Tall Man: The Complete TV Series on DVD in Region 1.
