= Jezebel's Kiss =

Jezebel’s Kiss
- DVD cover
- Directed by: Harvey Keith
- Screenplay by: Harvey Keith
- Starring: Katherine Barrese, Malcolm McDowell, Meredith Baxter, Meg Foster, Everett McGill
- Edited by: Mort Fallick, Michael Rubin
- Music by: Mitchel Forman
- Production company: Film Warriors
- Distributed by: IRS Media
- Release date: May 11, 1990 (United States)
- Running time: 96 minutes
- Country: United States
- Language: English

Jezebel’s Kiss is a 1990 American erotic thriller film directed by Harvey Keith and starring Katherine Barrese, Malcolm McDowell, Meredith Baxter, Meg Foster, and Everett McGill.

== Plot ==
A young, beautiful woman arrives in a small town to take revenge for the egregious injustice that was inflicted on her family many years ago. To fulfil her plans, she resorts to seduction and manipulation.

== Cast ==
- Katherine Barrese as Jezebel
- Sasha Barrese as Young Jezebel (as Alexandra Barrese)
- Malcolm McDowell as Benjamin J. Faberson
- Meredith Baxter as Virginia De Leo
- Meg Foster as Amanda Faberson
- Everett McGill as Sheriff Dan Riley
- Brent David Fraser as Hunt Faberman
- Bert Remsen as Doctor Samuel Whatley
- Elizabeth Ruscio as Margie
- Hal Jon Norman as Grandfather
