= The Restless Gun =

American Western television series (1957–1959)

- Title card
- Genre: Western
- Directed by: Christian Nyby; Edward Ludwig; Sam Strangis; Earl Bellamy; Justus Addiss
- Starring: John Payne
- Narrated by: John Payne
- Composers: Paul Dunlap; Dave Kahn; Stanley Wilson
- Country of origin: United States
- Original language: English
- No. of seasons: 2
- No. of episodes: 78

Production
- Executive producer: John Payne
- Producers: David Dortort; Felix Jackson
- Production location: American Southwest
- Running time: 30 minutes
- Production companies: Window Glen Productions; Revue Studios

Original release
- Network: NBC
- Release: September 23, 1957 – June 22, 1959

Related
- The Texan; Cheyenne

The Restless Gun is an American Western television series that appeared on NBC between 1957 and 1959, with John Payne in the role of Vint Bonner, a wandering cowboy in the era after the American Civil War. A skilled gunfighter, Bonner is an idealist who prefers to resolve conflicts peacefully whenever possible. He is gregarious, intelligent, and public-spirited.

The half-hour black-and-white program aired for 78 episodes, including the pilot episode in which John Payne character's name is Britt Ponsett. The series was based on The Six Shooter, an old-time radio series that starred James Stewart and aired from 1953 to 1954. In the radio series, the main character's name was Britt Ponsett.

The Restless Gun theme song (officially titled "I Ride With the Wind") begins: "I ride with the wind, my eyes on the sun, and my hand on my restless gun..."

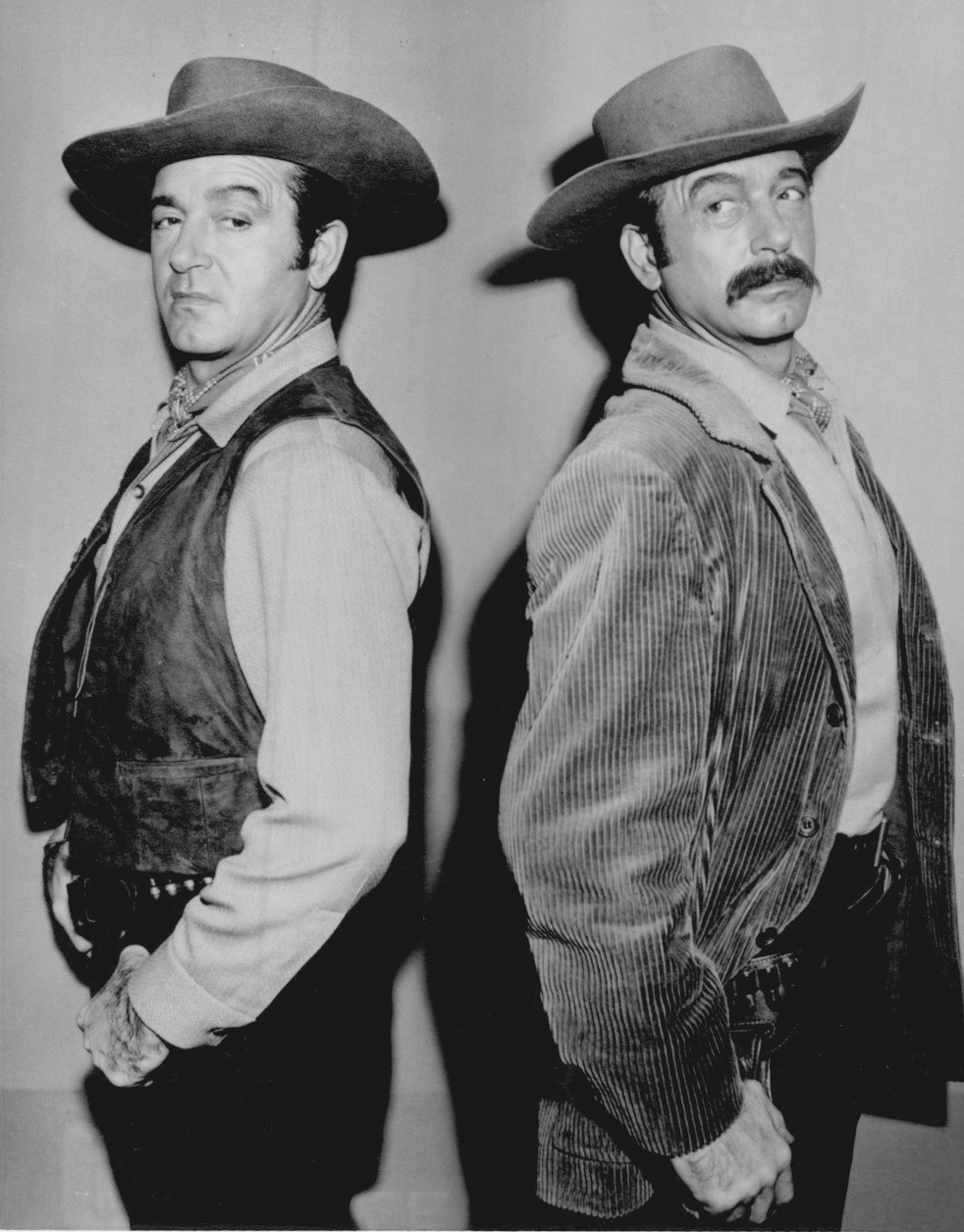
John Payne as Vint Bonner and villain Gene Baroda: The dual role in the 1959 episode "Dead Ringer" ended with a shootout between his two characters.

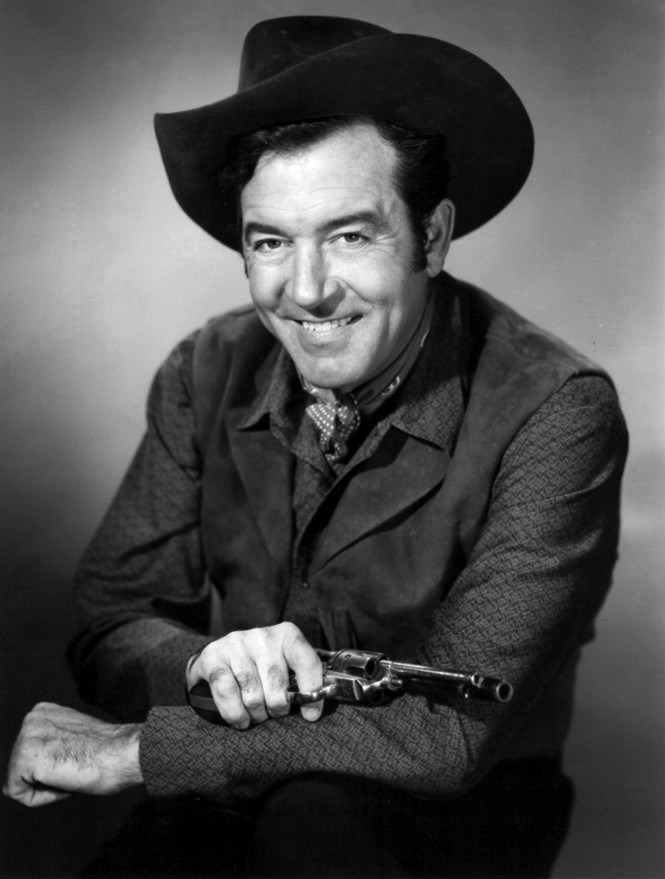
John Payne portrait for The Restless Gun in 1957

== Episodes ==
=== Season 1: 1957–58 ===
No. overall	No. in season	Title	Directed by	Written by	Original release date
0	0	"Pilot ('Red Lawson's Revenge')"	Robert Florey	N.B. Stone Jr.	March 29, 1957
1	1	"Duel at Lockwood"	Justus Addiss	Story by : Frank Burt; Teleplay by : David Dortort	September 23, 1957
2	2	"Trail to Sunset"	Justus Addiss	Story by : Frank Burt; Teleplay by : Herbert Little Jr. & David Victor	September 30, 1957
3	3	"Revenge at Harness Creek"	Edward Ludwig	Story by : Frank Burt; Teleplay by : Jack Jacobs & Malvin Wald	October 7, 1957
4	4	"Rink"	James Neilson	Story by : Frank Burt; Teleplay by : David Dortort	October 14, 1957
5	5	"Jenny"	Edward Ludwig	Story by : Frank Burt; Teleplay by : Marion Hargrove	October 21, 1957
6	6	"The Shooting of Jett King"	Justus Addiss	Story by : Frank Burt; Teleplay by : John Payne	October 28, 1957
7	7	"Jody"	Allen H. Miner	Story by : H.A. De Russo; Teleplay by : Gene L. Coon	November 4, 1957
8	8	"General Gilford's Widow"	Edward Ludwig	Story by : Frank Burt; Teleplay by : Halsey Malone	November 11, 1957
9	9	"The New Sheriff"	Edward Ludwig	Story by : Frank Burt; Teleplay by : Dean Riesner	November 18, 1957
10	10	"Man and Boy"	Edward Ludwig	Story by : Frank Burt; Teleplay by : David Victor	November 25, 1957
11	11	"Cheyenne Express"	Edward Ludwig	Story by : Frank Burt; Teleplay by : Christopher Knopf	December 2, 1957
12	12	"Thicker Than Water"	Edward Ludwig	Story by : Frank Burt; Teleplay by : Kenneth Gamet	December 9, 1957
13	13	"Silver Threads"	Edward Ludwig	Story by : Frank Burt; Teleplay by : Marion Hargrove	December 16, 1957
14	14	"The Child"	Edward Ludwig	Story by : John Payne; Teleplay by : Herbert Little Jr. & David Victor	December 23, 1957
15	15	"The Gold Buckle"	Justus Addiss	Story by : Frank Burt; Teleplay by : Dan Mainwaring	December 30, 1957
16	16	"The Coward"	Edward Ludwig	Story by : Frank Burt; Teleplay by : Christopher Knopf	January 6, 1958
17	17	"Friend in Need"	Edward Ludwig	Story by : Frank Burt; Teleplay by : William Tunberg	January 13, 1958
18	18	"Strange Family in Town"	Earl Bellamy	Lawrence Goldman	January 20, 1958
19	19	"Hang and Be Damned"	Earl Bellamy	Story by : Talmadge Powell; Teleplay by : David Dortort	January 27, 1958
20	20	"Quiet City"	Edward Ludwig	Story by : Frank Burt; Teleplay by : Alvin Sapinsley	February 3, 1958
21	21	"Hornitas Town"	Edward Ludwig	Jack Natteford & Luci Ward	February 10, 1958
22	22	"Imposter for a Day"	Earl Bellamy	Jack Laird & Wilton Schiller	February 17, 1958
23	23	"A Pressing Engagement"	Edward Ludwig	Story by : Frank Burt; Teleplay by : Mary C McCall Jr.	February 24, 1958
24	24	"Woman from Sacramento"	Edward Ludwig	Halsey Malone	March 3, 1958
25	25	"Sheriff Billy"	Edward Ludwig	Story by : Frank Burt; Teleplay by : Herbert Little Jr. & David Victor	March 10, 1958
26	26	"The Hand Is Quicker"	Earl Bellamy	Arthur Weiss	March 17, 1958
27	27	"The Suffragette"	Edward Ludwig	Charles B. Smith	March 24, 1958
28	28	"The Whip"	Edward Ludwig	Story by : Frank Burt; Teleplay by : Oliver Crawford	March 31, 1958
29	29	"The Crisis at Easter Creek"	Edward Ludwig	Story by : Frank Burt; Teleplay by : Jess Carneol & Kay Lenard	April 7, 1958
30	30	"Aunt Emma"	Edward Ludwig	Story by : Frank Burt; Teleplay by : Al Martin	April 14, 1958
31	31	"The Outlander"	Edward Ludwig	Herbert Little Jr. & David Victor	April 21, 1958
32	32	"The Battle of Tower Rock"	Edward Ludwig	Story by : Frank Burt; Teleplay by : Howard J. Green	April 28, 1958
33	33	"The Torn Flag"	Edward Ludwig	Alvin Sapinsley	May 5, 1958
34	34	"Hiram Grover's Strike"	Edward Ludwig	Story by : Frank Burt; Teleplay by : David Dortort	May 12, 1958
35	35	"The Gold Star"	Edward Ludwig	Story by : John Payne; Teleplay by : Alvin Sapinsley	May 19, 1958
36	36	"More Than Kin"	Edward Ludwig	Story by : Frank Burt; Teleplay by : David Dortort	May 26, 1958
37	37	"The Manhunters"	Edward Ludwig	Story by : Richard J. Harper; Teleplay by : Herbert Little Jr. & David Victor	June 2, 1958
38	38	"The Peddler"	Edward Ludwig	John Tucker Battle	June 9, 1958
39	39	"Gratitude"	Edward Ludwig	Arnold Belgard	June 16, 1958

=== Season 2: 1958–59 ===
No. overall	No. in season	Title	Directed by	Written by	Original release date
40	1	"Jebediah Bonner"	Edward Ludwig	Story by : Will Cook; Teleplay by : John Payne	September 22, 1958
41	2	"Day of the Dragon"	Justus Addiss	John Tucker Battle	September 29, 1958
42	3	"Mercyday"	Edward Ludwig	Charles B. Smith	October 6, 1958
43	4	"Thunder Alley"	Edward Ludwig	Story by : Hal G. Evarts; Teleplay by : Hal G. Evarts	October 13, 1958
44	5	"The Nowhere Kid"	Edward Ludwig	Mary C. McCall Jr.	October 20, 1958
45	6	"Bonner's Squaw"	Edward Ludwig	Joel Kane & Lee Karson	November 3, 1958
46	7	"Tomboy"	Edward Ludwig	Marion Hargrove	November 10, 1958
47	8	"Remember the Dead"	Justus Addiss	Hendrik Vollaerts	November 17, 1958
48	9	"No Way to Kill"	Edward Ludwig	John Falvo	November 24, 1958
49	10	"Take Me Home"	Edward Ludwig	Newt Arnold & David Cross	December 1, 1958
50	11	"Multiply One Boy"	Edward Ludwig	Lee Berg & Lawrence Menkin	December 8, 1958
51	12	"Peligroso"	Justus Addiss	Thomas Thompson	December 15, 1958
52	13	"A Bell for Santo Domingo"	Edward Ludwig	Richard Newman	December 22, 1958
53	14	"The Way Back"	Edward Ludwig	Robert Leslie Bellem & Frank Bonham	December 29, 1958
54	15	"The Painted Beauty"	Justus Addiss	Halsey Melone	January 5, 1959
55	16	"Shadow of a Gunfighter"	Edward Ludwig	Herman J. Groves	January 12, 1959
56	17	"The Lady and the Gun"	Edward Ludwig	Story by : Frank Burt; Teleplay by : David Dortort	January 19, 1959
57	18	"Blood of Courage"	Edward Ludwig	Ronald Bishop	February 2, 1959
58	19	"Better Than a Cannon"	Edward Ludwig	John Tucker Battle	February 9, 1959
59	20	"The Dead Ringer"	Edward Ludwig	John Tucker Battle	February 16, 1959
60	21	"The Last Grey Man"	Justus Addiss	Richard Newman	February 23, 1959
61	22	"Melany"	Justus Addiss	Herman J. Groves	March 2, 1959
62	23	"Ricochet"	Justus Addiss	Fanya Lawrence & Ted Thomas	March 9, 1959
63	24	"Dead Man's Hand"	Justus Addiss	Harry Kronman	March 16, 1959
64	25	"The Sweet Sisters"	Sam Strangis	Joel Kane & Lee Karson	March 23, 1959
65	26	"Incident at Bluefield"	Edward Ludwig	Herman J. Groves	March 30, 1959
66	27	"The Pawn"	Edward Ludwig	Charles B. Smith	April 6, 1959
67	28	"Four Lives"	Edward Ludwig	Thomas Thompson	April 13, 1959
68	29	"One on the House"	Edward Ludwig	Norman Daniels	April 20, 1959
69	30	"Code for a Killer"	Sam Strangis	Hal Fimberg & Frank Waldman	April 27, 1959
70	31	"Mme. Brimstone"	Sam Strangis	Adele Buffington	May 4, 1959
71	32	"Lady by Law"	Sam Strangis	Norman Daniels	May 11, 1959
72	33	"Ride with the Devil"	Sam Strangis	Nat Tanchuck	May 18, 1959
73	34	"A Trial for Jenny May"	Sam Strangis	John Tucker Battle	May 25, 1959
74	35	"The Cavis Boy"	Sam Strangis	Ronald Bishop & Wells Root	June 1, 1959
75	36	"The Englishman"	Sam Strangis	Story by : Lester Wm. Berke & Robert J. Black Jr. Teleplay by : Lester Wm. Berke, Robert J. Black Jr., & Richard Newman	June 8, 1959
76	37	"A Very Special Investigator"	Edward Ludwig	Arnold Belgard	June 15, 1959
77	38	"The Hill of Death"	Sam Strangis	Joe Stone	June 22, 1959

== Selected guest stars ==
- Fred Aldrich
- Claude Akins
- Robert Anderson
- Jimmy Baird
- Trevor Bardette
- Baynes Barron
- Jeanne Bates
- Bea Benaderet
- Robert Blake
- Dan Blocker
- Leslie Bradley
- Henry Brandon
- Edgar Buchanan
- Robert Burton
- Anthony Caruso
- Peggie Castle
- Andy Clyde
- James Coburn
- Iron Eyes Cody
- Johnny Crawford
- Richard H. Cutting
- Rick Dalton
- Royal Dano
- George Dolenz
- Jack Elam
- John Ericson
- Paul Fix
- James Gleason
- John Goddard
- Don Grady
- Tom Greenway
- Dabbs Greer
- Robert Griffin
- Herman Hack
- Alan Hale Jr.
- Chick Hannan
- Carol Henry
- Michael Hinn
- Bern Hoffman
- Clark Howat
- Ann Jillian
- I. Stanford Jolley
- Don Kennedy
- Lou Krugman
- Ethan Laidlaw
- Charles Lane
- Rusty Lane
- Ruta Lee
- Michael Lipton
- Herbert Lytton
- Ted Mapes
- Rod McGaughy
- Joyce Meadows
- Ewing Mitchell
- Read Morgan
- Vic Morrow
- J. Carrol Naish
- James Nolan
- Hal Jon Norman
- Gregg Palmer
- Hank Patterson
- William Phipps
- Joe Ploski
- Denver Pyle
- Mike Ragan
- Anthony Ray
- Roy Roberts
- Irene Ryan
- Frank J. Scannell
- George Selk
- Fred Sherman
- Olan Soule
- Onslow Stevens
- Boyd Stockman
- Glenn Strange
- Brick Sullivan
- Guy Teague
- Robert Tetrick
- Regis Toomey
- Rip Torn
- Jack Tornek
- Lurene Tuttle
- Charles Wagenheim
- James Westmoreland
- Guinn Williams

== Home media ==
On March 1, 2010, Timeless Media Group released a three-disc best-of set featuring 24 episodes from the series.

On April 23, 2013, Timeless Media released Restless Gun: The Complete Series on DVD in Region 1. The 9-disc set features all 78 episodes of the series.
