= Carlos Romero (actor) =

American actor (1927–2007)

- Born: February 15, 1927; Hollywood, California, U.S.
- Died: June 21, 2007 (aged 80); Ferndale, California, U.S.
- Occupations: Pro Ice Skater, Actor
- Years active: 1943–1997
- Spouses: Betty Schalow (m. 1947; div. 1949); Alix Bainbridge (m. 1958; div. 1967)
- Parent(s): Carlos Romero Sr, Malvina Polo

Carlos Romero (February 15, 1927 – June 21, 2007) was an American professional ice skater and actor. He was a prolific character actor, who appeared on 132 television episodes and eleven films during his half-century of performing.

== Early life ==
He was born Carlos Romero Jr, the only child of Carlos Romero Sr and Malvina Polo. His father, born Geronimo Quiroga in Monterrey, Mexico, fled to the United States as a child in 1910 with his large family. They had owned a hotel and theater in Monterrey, but supported the wrong side in the struggle between Venustiano Carranza and Pancho Villa during the Mexican Revolution.

The extended family adopted the stage name "The Dancing Romeros" for their act during the 1920s, when they performed shows at nightclubs, and later at movie theaters, in between exhibitions of silent pictures.

Carlos Sr switched to designing dance routines for nightclubs and films in the early 1930s. He became a naturalized U.S. citizen in 1938 under his stage name, sponsored by members of the Hollywood film industry with whom he worked. The family settled into the San Fernando Valley of California, where young Carlos attended first Van Nuys High School then North Hollywood High School. Carlos Romero Jr applied for his first social security card at age 15 in June 1942.

Besides film and nightclubs, his father also designed dances for Fanchon and Marco's entertainment partnership. They hired him to design routines for the International Polarink Follies, an ice show that debuted at the newly opened Polarink in Long Beach, California during March 1939. This show had business ties with the more well-known Ice Follies, and by 1943 Carlos Sr had become a director for it as well. His contracts with film studios usually included a clause granting him two months annual leave for work on ice shows. Carlos Jr thus had an early introduction to entertainment ice skating as a profession, as opposed to competitive skating.

== Start in skating ==
The Ice Follies of 1944 tour started in Los Angeles during September 1943. As Carlos Jr related it to a later interviewer, he was standing backstage at an early performance when someone shoved a horse head mask over him and pushed him out onto the ice. At sixteen he became a full time pro skater, traveling with the Ice Follies on its year-round tour. His hiring as a teenager was likely due to the absence of 21 male cast and crew of military age for the war effort. Newspapers, to distinguish him from his well-known father, consistently referred to him as "Carlos Romero Jr", which was his Ice Follies billing as well. He was among the cast in that year's official program and newspapers listed him with the other performers.

The Ice Follies was then entering its eighth year, with annual attendance approaching two million. Named for the coming year, each Ice Follies show would start performances at the Pan-Pacific Auditorium in Los Angeles during September. The entire company would travel on the Ice Follies Special, a special train, usually chartered from Great Northern Railways, to cities across the northern US and Canada. The tour would finish up in San Francisco, playing the current show for the summer months during evenings at the Winterland Arena, while rehearsing the new show for the coming season during the day.

Carlos was in Boston on tour with the Ice Follies of 1945 during February of that year when he turned eighteen. He registered for the draft with a local board in Boston, which then forwarded it to the district board for his permanent residence in Encino, California. According to the draft registrar, Carlos stood 6 ft 1 3/4 in (187.3 cm), weighed 152 pounds (69 kg), had hazel eyes, brown hair, and a sallow complexion. He lived with his father in Encino, was employed by the Ice Follies, had scars on the back of his head and right forefinger, and was left-handed.

== Military service ==
On June 26, 1945, while still on tour with the Ice Follies, Carlos enlisted in the US Army. According to his enlistment papers, Carlos was single, a citizen, had completed three years of high school, and was an athlete by occupation. He wasn't inducted right away, for he continued to perform with the Ice Follies through August 1945.

Carlos Jr apparently served in the US Army from early September 1945 through late August 1947, given his dates of absence from the Ice Follies. A later interview said he was assigned to the Signal Corps, possibly with a specialized entertainment unit, for he claimed to have emceed a GI show in Berlin for which he also did a song and dance routine.

Reporter Pat Laughrey interviewed Carlos Romero Jr just after his military service, when he had rejoined the Ice Follies. The tone of the interview may be judged from Carlos relating to the reporter that his nickname with the show was "Romero the Great". Like one of the charming, witty, fast-talking characters he would later play on television, he was not above giving a slight spin to the truth, saying he had enlisted after "December 1941", and served in France, Belgium, and Germany, letting the unwary assume from the order of countries that he was with the liberation forces, rather than the army of occupation.

An anonymous newspaper blurb from the same time frame mentioned Carlos Jr was a "Purple Heart wearer", while a later article referred to the performer Carlos Romero Jr as a "decorated war hero". The same description was repeated, along with the addendum that he had "narrowly escaped death", in a capsule profile from an official Ice Follies program. The ultimate source for these unlikely statements is unknown.

== Post service skating ==
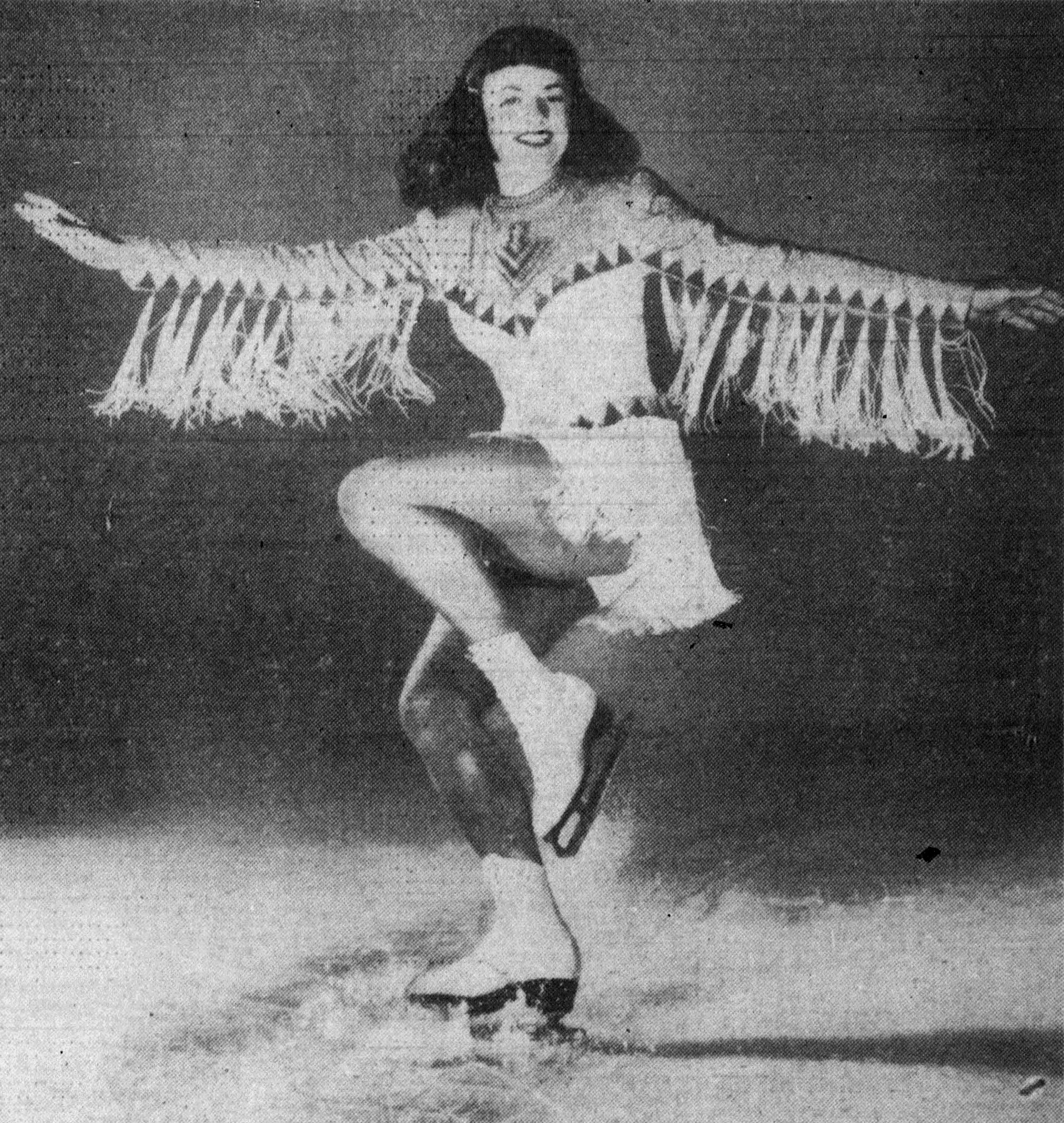
Romero was married to fellow ice skater Betty Schalow (pictured) from 1947 to 1949.

Starting in September 1947, Carlos toured with the Ice Follies of 1948. His father had switched to working for the competing Ice Vanities troupe in 1946. Despite the parental defection, Carlos resumed performing with the show in character parts, generally comic acrobatic bits. The tour's premiere at the Pan Pacific Auditorium in Hollywood was broadcast live by KTLA on September 18, 1947. This was Carlos first known appearance on screen, playing a matador trying to battle with the Disney character Ferdinand the Bull. Though the broadcast was not recorded, home movie film of the same premiere, including a brief scene of Carlos, was on YouTube as of August 2021.

While on tour during December 1947, Carlos married Ice Follies headliner and former National Pairs Champion Betty Schalow, who was two years older than him. The ceremony occurred during the finale of a Follies performance at the arena in Hershey, Pennsylvania, a longtime venue for all the touring ice shows. Carlos Romero Sr had to give his legal consent to the marriage, as under Pennsylvania law at the time the twenty year old Carlos Jr was still a minor. The marriage came as a complete surprise to their colleagues with the tour. The event was widely reported in newspapers, and marked a rise in Carlos profile with the tour. Though well-reviewed by the newspapers, Carlos was never a headliner, for he had no competitive skating background and lacked the technical virtuosity demanded of such.

Carlos continued touring with the Ice Follies through the spring of 1948 and stayed with them as they went into their summer quarters in San Francisco. He was cast again in Ice Follies of 1949 and the following year in Ice Follies of 1950. He was with the latter tour at least until January 1950, when newspapers stopped listing him among the other performers. Carlos and Betty apparently divorced in late 1949, though the exact date and location are not known. Betty soon remarried to another skater with the show and stayed with the Ice Follies until 1956.

== Stage and screen acting ==
Despite his father's contacts in the film industry, Carlos started his acting career on the stage. According to a later Hedda Hopper column, he seems to have been active in both New York and West Coast theatre, though details are lacking for the former. He was mentioned as a new addition to the cast of the Los Angeles-based Geller Theatre Workshop in November 1951, for a production of Moss Hart's Light Up The Sky, as "a former Ice Follies skater, who also has a number of years' Little Theater experience". His next documented stage performance was again with the Geller Theatre, in October 1953, for a production of The Two Mrs. Carrolls. This was also his first billing without the generational suffix of "Junior", which he abandoned going forward.

Carlos Romero did an episode of State Trooper in December 1957 that is his first known non-skating television role. He had supposedly done some television in New York, but verification for this is lacking. He had a surprising career arc on the screen, having a flood of television and film roles immediately upon this debut. For some early television character parts he was asked to wear a fake mustache. He had always been clean-shaven for performances prior to 1958, but casting directors and audiences soon came to expect a mustache, and he obliged. He would still appear without one for Native American roles, and for the occasional contemporary part.

== Later career ==
For 1981, Carlos had no television appearances, breaking a string of twenty-four years of continuous performances. He made up for the gap in the next two years, playing his longest recurring role for a series on Falcon Crest. His TV work gradually dwindled away to once a year in the mid-1980s, though he may have done work outside the US that isn't readily available for reference. His last known performance of any sort was at age 70 in 1997, for an episode of the Spanish comedy series La casa de los líos.

== Personal life ==
Carlos was interested in flying as a young man, and qualified for a pilot's license in 1947. He also liked bowling, swimming, riding horses, and hunting. Carlos was always readily accessible to fans who wanted a photo with him. He was noted for his keen sense of humor and fast patter, and was not above joshing an interviewer with exaggerations about himself.

Almost ten years after his divorce from Betty Schalow, Carlos married Alix Bainbridge, nine years his junior, during August 1958. They had a son, born a little more than a year later, but divorced in August 1967. Despite a strong physical resemblance, Carlos Romero was apparently not related to actor Cesar Romero.

=== Death ===
Carlos Romero passed away in Ferndale, California on June 21, 2007.

== Filmography ==
=== Film ===
Year	Title	Role	Notes
1958	The World Was His Jury	2nd Officer Johnson	
1958	The True Story of Lynn Stuart	Fred	Uncredited
1958	The Gun Runners	Carlos Contreras	
1959	The Young Land	Francisco Quiroga	
1959	They Came to Cordura	Arreaga	
1962	Deadly Duo	Police Lieutenant Reyes	
1964	Island of the Blue Dolphins	Chowig	
1966	Lanza tus penas al viento		
1966	The Professionals	2nd Revolutionary	
1973	Soylent Green	New Tenant	
1973	The Don Is Dead	Mariano Longobardo	Uncredited

=== Television ===
Year	Series	Role	Episode	Notes
1947	Ice Follies	Matador / Magician	(Sept 18, 1947)	A live local broadcast on KTLA from the Pan-Pacific Auditorium
1957	State Trooper	Pablo Viejo	The Gandy Dancers of Steptoe Valley	
1958	Wagon Train	Dan Romero	The Luke O'Malley Story	
1958	Broken Arrow	Natan	Power	
1958	How to Marry a Millionaire	Ramon Valdez	The Big Order	
1958	The Gale Storm Show		Hayride Ahoy	
1958	Zorro	Romero Serrano	Welcome to Monterrey	
1958	Zorro	Romero Serrano	Horse of Another Color	
1958	Zorro	Romero Serrano	The Senorita Makes a Choice	
1958	Cimarron City	Joaquin Avila (uncredited)	Twelve Guns	
1958	Zorro	Romero Serrano	Rendezvous at Sundown	
1958	The Adventures of Rin Tin Tin	Strong Branch	Miracle of the Mission	
1958	The Californians	Jose Limantour	The Man Who Owned San Francisco	
1959	The Adventures of Rin Tin Tin	Running Deer	Ol' Betsy	
1959	Death Valley Days	Captain Carlos Rico	Price of a Passport	
1959	Wagon Train	Carlos Soldareo	The Conchita Vasquez Story	
1959	Bronco	Angelo	Prairie Skipper	
1959	Bat Masterson	Dale - Henchman	The Black Pearls	
1959	Rawhide	Goyo	S2:E1, Incident of the Day of the Dead	
1959	Cheyenne	Lieutenant Jose Montez	The Rebellion	
1959	Wichita Town	Rico Rodriguez	Bullet for a Friend	Carlos had a brief recurring character part on this series
1959	Wichita Town	Rico Rodriguez	They Won't Hang Jimmy Relson	
1959	Richard Diamond, Private Detective	Jose	The Client	
1959	Wanted: Dead Or Alive	Juan Gomez	Desert Seed	
1959	Wichita Town	Rico Rodriguez	Out of the Past	
1960	Maverick	Manuel Ortiz	The Marquesa	
1960	Cheyenne	Moccasin Charlie	Gold, Glory and Custer - Requiem	
1960	Riverboat	Juan Miguel (uncredited)	The Blowup	
1960	Wichita Town	Rico Rodriguez	The Long Night	
1960	Shotgun Slade	Mario Guiagoes	Donna Juanita	
1960	Bronco	Urbino	La Rubia	
1960	Bat Masterson	Juan Torrino	Gold Is Where You Steal It	
1960	Bourbon Street Beat	Ramon Rivera	Green Hell	
1960	Rawhide	Mendoza	S2:E30, Incident of the Silent Web	
1960	Wagon Train	Indian #1 (Uncredited)	Wagons Ho!	
1960	Peter Gunn	Sol Escobar	Mask of Murder	
1960	Cheyenne	Luiz Perez	Road to Three Graves	
1960	Rawhide	Asunta	S3:E7, "Incident at Superstition Prairie"	
1961	Zorro	Ansar	The Postponed Wedding	
1961	Surfside 6	Juan Escudero	Heels Over Head	
1961	Maverick	Ricardo Padilla	Dutchman's Gold	
1961	The Case of the Dangerous Robin		Doll of Death	
1961	Gunslinger	Colonel Delgado	Road of the Dead	
1961	Maverick	Clete Spain	Substitute Gun	
1961	Checkmate	Arturo Calderone	Dance of Death	
1961	77 Sunset Strip	Senor Seradil	Hot Tamale Caper Part 1	
1961	77 Sunset Strip	Senor Seradil	Hot Tamale Caper Part 2	
1961	Rawhide	Antonio Marcos	S4:E1, Rio Salado	
1961	Have Gun – Will Travel	Juan Quintos	Squatter's Rights	
1962	77 Sunset Strip	Caesar Martinez	The Parallel Caper	
1962	The Dick Powell Theater		Borderline	
1962	Rawhide	Antonio Chavez	S5:E14, Incident of Decision	
1963	Empire	Max	Where the Hawk Is Wheeling	
1963	Alcoa Premiere	Sergeant Sandy Sandoval	The Hat of Sargeant Martin	Carlos was on this ABC show the same night (Feb 7)....
1963	Perry Mason	Raul Perez	The Case of the Libelous Locket	....that he was on this CBS show
1963	Wagon Train	Bandit Leader (Uncredited)	The Tom Tuesday Story	
1963	Have Gun – Will Travel	Nino Ybarra	The Black Bull	
1963	The Virginian	Pedro	The Mountain of the Sun	
1963	The Alfred Hitchcock Hour	Alfau - Mexican Police Chief	Season 1 Episode 28: "Last Seen Wearing Blue Jeans"	
1963	Rawhide	Hernan Maldenado	S5:E29, Incident at Rio Doloroso	
1963	GE True	Lieutenant Juan Garcia	Five Tickets to Hell	A clean-shaven Carlos stars as a Mexican police officer
1964	Perry Mason	Nonno Volente	The Case of the Scandalous Sculptor	
1964	Walt Disney's Wonderful World of Color	Commandante Maldonado	The Tenderfoot Part 1	
1965	Ben Casey	Dr. Elton De Los Rios	A Horse Named Stravinsky	
1965	Laredo	Miguel	I See By Your Outfit	
1966	Daniel Boone	Francisco	Gabriel	
1966	I Spy	Bandit #1	The Conquest of Maude Murdock	
1966	Perry Mason	Ricardo Arena	The Case of the Tsarina's Tiara	
1966	The Big Valley	Leon	Legend of a General Part 1	
1966	The Big Valley	Leon	Legend of a General Part 2	
1966	The Fugitive	Morales	Wine Is a Traitor	
1967	The FBI	Calderon	The Gray Passenger	
1967	The Fugitive	Sergeant Rodriguez	Death of a Very Small Killer	
1967	The Invaders	Luis Perez	The Storm	
1967	The FBI	S. A. Robert Vega	The Extortionist	
1967	Death Valley Days	Jose de la Cruz Romero	Along Came Mariana	
1967	The Wild Wild West	The Lieutenant	The Night of the Assassin	
1967	The High Chaparral	Romero	The Widow from Red Rock	Carlos does another doubleheader, appearing on this NBC show....
1967	The F.B.I.	Bartender	Line of Fire	....the same night (November 26) he was on this ABC show
1968	Run For Your Life	Lieutenant Ortiz	A Dangerous Proposal	
1968	It Takes a Thief	Andreas	One Night on Soledade	
1968	Dragnet	Juan	Robbery: DR-15	
1968	Mannix	Jug Haskins	The End of the Rainbow	
1969	The Mod Squad	Frank Salido	The Sunday Drivers	
1969	The F.B.I.	Captain Ortiz	The Patriot	
1969	The Guns of Will Sonnett	Carlos	A Town in Terror Part 1	
1969	The Guns of Will Sonnett	Carlos	A Town in Terror Part 2	
1969	Family Affair	Senor Mendez	The Young Man from Bolivia	
1969	It Takes a Thief	Director	The Baranhoff Timetable	
1969	D.A.: Murder One	Bob Ramirez	(TV Movie)	
1970	The High Chaparral	Sargente	Fiesta	
1970	The Virginian	Raul Armendez	Last of the Comancheros	
1971	The Smith Family	Mike Blanco	Chicano	
1971	Family Affair	Mr. Alvarez	You Can't Fight City Hall	
1971	Cannon	Moreno	Scream of Silence	
1971	The F.B.I.		Bitter Harbor	
1972	O'Hara, U.S. Treasury	Peter Wade	Operation: Mr Felix	
1972	Adam-12	Reuben Sanchez	Gifts and Long Letters	Carlos played a detective sergeant on three episodes of this series
1973	Adam-12	Reuben Sanchez	O'Brien's Stand	
1973	Streets of San Francisco	Supervisor Pete Delgado	Deathwatch	
1973	Adam-12	Reuben Sanchez	Nightwatch	
1974	Kung Fu	Doctor	Empty Pages of a Dead Book	
1974	Banacek	Sheriff Ortega	Fly Me- If You Can Find Me	
1974	Barnaby Jones	Jarras	Rendezvous with Terror	
1974	Chase	Felix Martinez	The People Parlay	
1974	The Six Million Dollar Man	Ferndo Ferraga	Act of Piracy	
1975	Kolchak: The Night Stalker	George Andrews	Legacy of Terror	
1975	Chico and the Man	Diner Owner Ramon	Bird in a Gilded Cage	
1976	Cannon	Captain Landivar	Bloodlines	
1977	Wonder Woman	Colonel Acevo	Return of Wonder Woman	
1978	Rockford Files	Sam Gurolla	South By Southeast	
1979	Hart to Hart	Doctor	Passport to Murder	
1980	Barnaby Jones	Carlos Duquesa	Killer Without a Name	
1982	Falcon Crest	Carlo Agretti	For Love or Money	
1982	Code Red	Robles	Trapped by Time	
1982	Falcon Crest	Carlo Agretti	House of Cards	
1982	Falcon Crest	Carlo Agretti	The Good, the Bad, and the Profane	
1982	Falcon Crest	Carlo Agretti	The Challenge	
1982	Falcon Crest	Carlo Agretti	The Arrival	
1982	Falcon Crest	Carlo Agretti	Troubled Waters	
1982	Falcon Crest	Carlo Agretti	Murder One	
1983	Hart to Hart	Emil Herrera	Pounding Harts	
1983	T. J. Hooker	Senor Diez	Raw Deal	
1983	Falcon Crest	Carlo Agretti	Cimmerean Dawn	
1983	Falcon Crest	Carlo Agretti	Conspiracy	
1984	The Fall Guy	Moreno	Rabbit's Feet	
1985	Scarecrow and Mrs. King	Julian Zaken	Spiderweb	
1985	The A-Team	Zuniga	Knights of the Road	
1986	Dynasty	Judge J. Thebom	The Arraignment	
1987	Magnum, P.I.	Grady Walker	Tigers Fan	
1988	Days of Our Lives	Mr. Kent	Episode of Sept 7, 1988	
1989	L.A. Law	Alfredo Perez	Urine Trouble Now	This was Carlos final US television appearance
1997	La casa de los líos	Guijarro	La boda de Arturo Valdés	His final television appearance was on this comedy series in Spain
