= Living Dead =

Horror franchise

- Created by: George A. Romero; John A. Russo
- Original work: Night of the Living Dead (1968)

Print publications
- Novels: List of novels
- Comics: List of comics

Films and television
- Films: List of films

Games
- Video games: List of video games

Living Dead, also informally known as Of the Dead is a blanket term for the loosely connected horror franchise that originated from the 1968 film Night of the Living Dead. The film, written by George A. Romero and John A. Russo, primarily focuses on a group of people gathering at a farmhouse to survive from an onslaught of zombies in rural Pennsylvania. It is known to have inspired the modern interpretation of zombies as reanimated human corpses that feast on the flesh and/or brains of the living.

Due to a copyright error during its release, Night of the Living Dead's status in the public domain has resulted in numerous works claiming to expand upon or spin off from the plot points and characters of the film, sometimes without the involvement of the original cast and crew members. They consist of various films, literature, and other forms of media that explore the outbreak and evolution of a zombie apocalypse and society's reaction to it. The two most notable are Romero's Dead series, consisting of five additional films, and the Return of the Living Dead series, which was loosely based on Russo's novel of the same name.

== Films ==
=== George A. Romero's Dead series ===
As of its latest installment, Survival of the Dead, Romero's Dead series includes six films all written and directed by Romero himself. Labeled Trilogy of the Dead until Land of the Dead, each film is laden with social commentary on topics ranging from racism to consumerism. The films are not produced as direct follow-ups from one another, and the only continuation is the epidemic of the living dead. This situation advances with each film, but with different characters, and the time moves ahead to the time when they were filmed, making the world's progression the only interlocking aspect of the series. The fifth film does not continue the depiction of the progress of the world; acting as a reboot, it is nonetheless contemporary just as the sequels are. The films deal with how different people react to the same phenomenon ranging from citizens to police to army officials and back again. There are no real happy endings to the films, as each takes place in a world that has gotten worse since the last time we saw it, the number of zombies ever increasing and the fate of the living remnant always in the balance.

Romero tried to make each movie unique from the previous, but this led to some of his more serious works, like Day of the Dead, receiving a worse reception compared to his spoof-like film Dawn of the Dead. He explained this in an interview with Telegraph film reviewer Tim Robey saying, "You know, I've made six zombie films, I've tried consciously to make each one different from the next. But that's not what people want these days. They want the same thing! I don't know if that's part of this television mentality, where people tune in every week to see the same thing." Romero does not consider any of his Dead films sequels since none of the major characters or story continue from one film to the next. The one exception is that the military officer from Diary of the Dead (Alan van Sprang), who robs the main characters, is a main character in Survival of the Dead as well.

George A. Romero's Dead series includes:

1. Night of the Living Dead (1968)
2. Dawn of the Dead (1978)
3. Day of the Dead (1985)
4. Land of the Dead (2005)
5. Diary of the Dead (2007)
6. Survival of the Dead (2009)
7. Twilight of the Dead (2027)

=== Dead series remakes ===
Remakes have been made for three of the original films with the involvement of some of the original cast and crew members:

==== Night of the Living Dead (1990) ====
Directed by Tom Savini, former special make-up effects artist, who worked on Dawn of the Dead and Day of the Dead while George A. Romero rewrote the screenplay. The plot of the film follows closely the 1968 original, where Barbara, Ben, the Cooper family and Tom Landry and his girlfriend Judy Rose Larson are trapped in a rural farmhouse in Pennsylvania trying to survive the night while the house is being attacked by mysteriously reanimated ghouls, otherwise known as zombies.

==== Dawn of the Dead (2004) ====
Directed by Zack Snyder. A group of strangers: Ana, Police Sergeant Kenneth Hall, Michael, Andre and his pregnant wife, Luda, break into a nearby mall where they are confronted by three living guards – C.J., Bart and Terry – who make them surrender their weapons in exchange for refuge. The group secures the mall, then heads to the roof where they see another survivor, Andy, who is stranded alone in his gun store, across the zombie-infested parking lot. The next day more survivors arrive at the mall and are let in. After some of the survivors start dying from zombie attacks and any hope of being rescued gone, the group decides to fight their way to the Milwaukee marina and travel on Steve's yacht to an island on Lake Michigan.

==== Day of the Dead (2008) ====
Directed by Steve Miner, the story is located in Leadville, Colorado, where the couple of Trevor and Nina find themselves in a town suddenly sealed off by military forces. People begin acting strangely and the dead come back to life, with the couple and the soldiers trying to escape.

=== Dan O'Bannon and John Russo's Living Dead spin-offs ===
There are currently two distinct franchises utilizing the Living Dead moniker. The first was Return of the Living Dead, which originated as a novel written in 1978 by John A. Russo. It was later adapted to a film by Dan O'Bannon, which spawned its own series of movies, with a total of four sequels. This could be seen more as a spinoff of Night of the Living Dead rather than sequels, as the first movie treats Night of the Living Dead as a movie that was based on real events.

Russo and producer Tom Fox planned to bring Return of the Living Dead to the screen offering O'Bannon the director's seat, he accepted on the condition he could rewrite the film radically so as to differentiate it from Romero's films. O'Bannon discarded Russo's script in its entirety and rewrote it, retaining only the title and changing the "rules" significantly. His alterations to the canon include the zombies' fixation on brains alone (whereas Romero/Russo zombies will devour any part of a living human), the ability to move rapidly and communicate (despite physical defects that would render such activity impossible), and the ability of 2–4–5 Trioxin to resurrect any deceased life form, regardless of how long the decedent has been interred. Although Russo and O'Bannon were only directly involved with the first film in the series, the rest of the films, to varying degrees, stick to their outline and "rules" established in the first film.

Dan O'Bannon's Return of the Living Dead series includes:

1. The Return of the Living Dead (O'Bannon, 1985)
2. Return of the Living Dead Part II (Ken Wiederhorn, 1988)
3. Return of the Living Dead 3 (Brian Yuzna, 1993)
4. Return of the Living Dead: Necropolis (Ellory Elkayem, 2005)
5. Return of the Living Dead: Rave to the Grave (Ellory Elkayem, 2005)
6. Return of the Living Dead (Steve Wolsh, TBA)

Then, in 1998, Russo went back to the original Night of the Living Dead to reshoot extra sequences into the film. This version, which was officially named Night of the Living Dead: 30th Anniversary Edition, added a subplot, alternate opening, and new score. Russo followed this with another Living Dead film, Children of the Living Dead. Finally, in 2026, Russo served as Producer on the newest Living Dead film, "Rebirth of the Living Dead" from prolific indie Filmmaker Dustin Ferguson.

1. Night of the Living Dead: 30th Anniversary Edition (Russo, 1998)
2. Children of the Living Dead (Karen L. Wolf, 2001)
3. Rebirth of the Living Dead (Dustin Ferguson, 2026)

== Romero's vs. O'Bannon's zombies ==
While the two kinds are similar in appearance, there are certain distinguishing details:

=== Infection ===
Romero's original Night of the Living Dead explains that an unknown phenomenon causes re-animation of the brain. Instead of being spread from person to person, the phenomenon presents itself in any human that has recently died from any cause (except those that destroy the physical structure of the brain). The first animated corpses appear in many locations simultaneously, quickly reaching pandemic levels. Characters speculate about the cause of the phenomenon; suggestions at various times include a spaceborne virus, divine punishment, radiation from a satellite returning from Venus, or that "there's no more room in Hell". While bites from these reanimated creatures are uniformly lethal, by mechanics unknown, death by other means would have the same result, so a bite is not necessary. It is suggested in Day of the Dead that the immediate amputation of bitten limbs may prevent victims from dying, but while the treatment is attempted, its success is never conclusively demonstrated. In George Romero's original Day of the Dead idea, a person was to have his bitten arm amputated, but still return as a zombie. Survival of the Dead shows that, in the rare instance of a living person biting the undead, that person will become infected. Many characters in films (including George Romero himself) have referred to the bitten area as the "infected area" or an "infection".

The state of zombification seen in O'Bannon's Return of the Living Dead series is induced by the chemical compound Trioxin, an extremely toxic substance found in a gaseous state at standard temperature and pressure. Depending on the film in the series, Trioxin zombies may or may not be able to contaminate living humans with Trioxin via bite. Very small amounts of Trioxin are sufficient to have full effect, and bodies need not be fresh to be re-animated. Both factors were illustrated in the first two films, wherein Trioxin seeped through several feet of earth to reach graves several decades old and animate the occupants (The Return of the Living Dead even depicted a near-skeleton coming out of its grave). If a zombie corpse is stored for too long in a sealed container, the decomposition process will generate noxious gases containing trace amounts of Trioxin, so the drum can only be safely opened in a sealed lab environment. The requirement of Trioxin exposure makes containment to a specific area or group of people somewhat easier than Romero's plague (though the extreme tenacity of the zombies may mitigate this advantage).

=== Memory ===
Romero's zombies have very limited to no memory of their previous life. But they all remember how to walk, and how to use their hands for several tasks (such as striking or holding something or someone). They recognize many objects such as cars, houses and other structures, and they recognize the doors in order to enter them. As characters state in Dawn of the Dead, the zombies are in the mall since it was "an important place in their lives". They also kept the instinct of eating and biting. In Day of the Dead, the zombie dubbed 'Bub' is experimented on and trained by the scientist Logan and recalls how to use a razor, a telephone, and a book. When Capt. Rhodes walks in the room, Bub salutes him, fires an unloaded pistol at him, and later in the movie shoots Capt. Rhodes with a loaded pistol, going so far as to ensure it was loaded this time, as he remembered the previous gun not having fired. In Land of the Dead, the undead retained some memory of their past lives, allowing them to use tools they remember operating, and even display emotion, giving some of Bub's intelligence to other zombies.

The zombies in the Return of the Living Dead series retain their full memories as of their time of death, whether or not they were reanimated immediately or after long interment.

=== Intelligence ===
Romero's zombies initially lack full cognitive function and act only on a single drive: the need to seek and consume living flesh. Night of the Living Dead depicted zombies eating animals as well as humans. The zombies have no true physiological need for flesh, nor can their expired digestive organs derive sustenance from it at all. This was discovered by Dr. Logan (nicknamed "Frankenstein") during his many experiments on "living" zombie specimens and reported to Sarah in Day of the Dead. The animated dead retain vague impulses derived from former living behavior. For instance, zombies often return to specific locations they frequented when alive (examples from the original Dawn of the Dead, hordes of zombies are compelled to congregate in a shopping mall, and one zombie knows where to find the secret hideout containing its still-living former companions). Lacking immediate victims to hunt, zombies will often fumble through crude motions reminiscent of life activities, often when prompted by a familiar artifact such as a telephone or car. With stimulus, it is possible for some specimens to begin to remember more of the common activities they performed while alive and achieve a basic functioning intelligence. In Day of the Dead, the zombie nicknamed Bub was "educated" into docility by Dr. Logan, learned (or remembered) how to operate a handgun and even developed a childlike affection for its instructor. In Land of the Dead, the zombie known as Big Daddy developed sophisticated cognitive function on his own, felt affection and empathy for his fellow zombies (even putting some of them out of their misery when they were injured), could teach other zombies how to use objects (including weapons) and devised crude strategies for bypassing the defenses of the living humans who had destroyed many of his fellows. The more intelligent zombies like Bub and Big Daddy retain their hunger for living human flesh, but can put off immediate gratification if doing so offers a chance for a more significant reward later.

In O'Bannon's universe, if bodies are still in good condition when they are reanimated, then the resulting zombies really are capable of the same things as normal living humans. Basically, they are like normal humans but with an uncontrollable need to eat brains, which ease the great and constant pain felt from their own decomposition. Depending on their own intelligence, from the previous life, they can actually resist their need for eating brains to the benefit of survival and to elaborate some "brain-hunting" tactics. For instance, a rotten, half-melted zombie dubbed "Tarman" desperately tries to pull down a closet door with a winch in order to catch one of the protagonists: Tina, his intended victim. He fails to get Tina, but manages to eat one of her friends who comes to her rescue. This also goes as far as posing as a normal living human (like a cop signaling cars to stop on the side) or calling friends or other people and asking them for help, basically anything to attract and trap new living fresh brains when they get close enough. It is also worth noting that, as seen in Return of the Living Dead Part 2, these zombies will act communally; for example, waiting to open a gate for all the other zombies rather than simply taking the brains for themselves.

=== Locomotion ===
Romero's zombies are slow and shambling. In interviews, George Romero has attributed this quality to rigor mortis, and to the poor condition of their ankles. A sheriff in Night of the Living Dead sagely suggests that their limited mobility is due to the fact that "they're dead, they're...all messed up." In Diary of the Dead (2007, post Dawn of the Dead remake) the director of the student horror film tells his living dead actor (a mummy, in this case) not to move quickly because "if you run that fast your ankles are going to snap off." When that character later becomes an actual zombie and shambles after a victim the director says "See? I told you dead things move slow!" The cemetery zombie in Night of the Living Dead and the two zombie children in Dawn of the Dead (1978) are the only running zombies in the series.

O'Bannon's Trioxin-contaminated zombies can run if not physically injured and display quite normal mobility if not too decomposed. They have the added advantage of remaining mobile even if significant body mass is lost. Several times, zombies who have lost their legs remain agile and quick through the use of their arms.

=== Speech ===
In Romero's series, zombies never get much beyond basic grunts and groans or even screams. The aforementioned zombie Bub makes a praiseworthy effort to say "Hello Aunt Alicia," but the result is largely incomprehensible. Big Daddy in Land of the Dead was able to crudely laugh after finding a jackhammer.

In the Return of the Living Dead series, a zombie can speak normally (even if its lungs, trachea, and facial muscles are largely missing) but it tends to only be one word ("brains!") or any real conversation will tend to lean towards their attraction to the listener's brain, how good it must taste and the speaker's overwhelming desire to consume it. There are glaring exceptions to this in Return of the Living Dead 2, where a severed head complains of a screwdriver sticking out of its head and proceeds to speak rather casually to the panicking group, and an older male zombie pretends to be human over the phone and answers 'Harry Truman' to the question of who the current president was. Another instance in Return of the Living Dead 3 involves a very fresh corpse that had not even been buried yet.

=== Termination ===
The only way a Romero zombie can die is if its brain is destroyed. Zombies can also be burned as shown in Night of the Living Dead. A zombie's mobility may be hampered by structural damage, but such damage will do nothing to reduce the "life force" driving the body. Body parts severed from an undead brain will become inanimate. Simply removing the head does not kill the zombie; the head would remain alive, as shown in Day of the Dead.

In contrast, a typical O'Bannon zombie simply cannot be deactivated short of complete destruction. Any severed body parts will still remain animate, resulting in two or more moving parts. Therefore, decapitation produces both an animate head and an animate body wandering around still trying to catch a living human. There are only two known ways to permanently kill a zombie. One is completely burning the body (as seen in the cremation scene from The Return of the Living Dead), though burning the body releases Trioxin-laced smoke into the air, which can combine with clouds to create Trioxin-laced rain. Another way is electrocuting the zombie until they cease to move or squirm (see Return of the Living Dead Part II). In the third film, scientists invented an endothermic chemical dart that freezes the brain, incapacitating the zombie, but its effective duration is wildly unpredictable. This zombie endurance is nevertheless contradicted in both the fourth and fifth films in the series, where the zombies are easily destroyed by attack, including attacks that do not damage the brain. Another discontinuity in the Return of the Living Dead series is that, in the fourth film, the zombies do not seem to be capable of running, and tend to move as slow as the zombies in the Romero series.

== Unauthorized sequels and remakes ==
There are also some other films that have been released as sequels to various films in Romero's Dead series, most likely to ride on the name recognition that Romero's films enjoy. They have been produced due to the various mix-ups with the copyright and ownership of the movies, Romero himself owns only Dawn of the Dead from his first four films. Romero is often positive towards derivations of his work, stating that any new film in the horror genre is a step forward, whether completely original or a 'copycat'.

=== Zombi 2 (1979) ===
Directed by Lucio Fulci. Also known as Zombie in the U.S. and as Zombie Flesh Eaters in the U.K. The film that was already in production when Dawn of the Dead was released, but was renamed to be a sequel upon its release (Dawn of the Dead was titled Zombi in Italy). This movie has a history of official and unofficial sequels itself (see Zombi (film series)).

=== Children of the Living Dead (2001) ===
Directed by Tor Ramsey, the film is loosely connected to the original Night of the Living Dead, with the first film's events being referenced to. The film deals with several zombie outbreaks led by a zombie serial killer and rapist named Abbott Hayes.

=== Day of the Dead 2: Contagium (2005) ===
Directed by Ana Clavell and James Dudelson. While billed as a sequel to Day of the Dead, as Taurus Entertainment Company holds the original's copyright, it has no actual ties to the original Day of the Dead or the series (although the prologue is set in Pittsburgh 1968).

Taurus Entertainment Company eventually announced plans in August 2009 to produce a sequel, with a working title-turned-official title, Day of the Dead: Epidemic, which would have been the third installment of the series, but it was never produced.

=== Night of the Living Dead 3D (2006) ===
Directed by Jeff Broadstreet. The film is a remake/reimagining of the original film made in a 3D format. The original's status as public domain made it possible to produce this film without the involvement of either Romero or Russo.

=== Mimesis: Night of the Living Dead (2011) ===
Relates the story of a group of horror film fans who become involved in a "real-life" version of the 1968 film.

=== Night of the Living Dead: Resurrection (2012) ===
British director James Plumb made this remake set in Wales.

=== Night of the Living Dead 3D: Re-Animation (2012) ===
This film is a prequel to Night of the Living Dead 3D and is not the same as Night of the Living Dead: Reanimated (2009) , which is an animated film using various techniques to retell the story of the original film.

=== A Night of the Living Dead (2014) ===
Shattered Images Films and Cullen Park Productions released a remake with new twists and characters, written and directed by Chad Zuver.

=== Night of the Living Dead: Darkest Dawn (2015) ===
3D animated film presenting the events of the original film in a more modern setting

=== Day of the Dead: Bloodline (2017) ===
In December 2017, a second reimagining of Day of the Dead was released, titled Day of the Dead: Bloodline.

=== Rebirth (formerly Night of the Living Dead: Rebirth) (2020) ===
Rising Pulse Productions planned an updated take on the classic film that brings to light present issues that impact modern society such as religious bigotry, homophobia, and the influence of social media.

== Parodies ==
There have also been ultra-low budget parodies such as:

=== Night of the Living Bread (1990) ===
Directed by Kevin S. O'Brien. A parody of the original film, where a satellite crashes to Earth bringing radiation that promptly animates – as opposed to re-animating – all manner of homicidal bread, from buns to biscuits to Communion wafers.

=== Night of the Day of the Dawn [...] (1991) ===
Night of the Day of the Dawn is the shortened title of a parody created by James Riffel, which is the classic Night of the Living Dead film with redubbed comedic dialogue and some new clips. The complete title of the movie is: Night of the Day of the Dawn of the Son of the Bride of the Return of the Revenge of the Terror of the Attack of the Evil, Mutant, Alien, Flesh Eating, Hellbound, Zombified Living Dead Part 2.

=== Poultrygeist: Night of the Chicken Dead (2006) ===
Directed by Lloyd Kaufman. After a fictional fried chicken franchise opens a restaurant on the location of an Indian burial ground, the chicken corpses come to life, wreaking havoc on the site.

=== Night of the Loving Dead (2014) ===
Directed by J.F. Kinyon. A short-film parody of the original George Romero film, a zombie attacks a couple in an old graveyard to impress his zombie girlfriend.

== Homages ==
There have also been films that pay homage to the genre:

=== Shaun of the Dead (2004) ===
Directed by Edgar Wright, the film is about an unmotivated slacker who must cope with a zombie uprising, in London, while trying to sort his life out. Simon Pegg notes in the interview on the DVD Release of Shaun of the Dead and in an interview on BBC Radio 1 prior to the film's release that they sought George A. Romero's blessing and acknowledgement or the film would not have been released. Simon Pegg comments that "George in fact loved it so much, we [Simon Pegg and Edgar Wright] were asked to be in the film Land of the Dead as leading characters, but we said no, no way, definitely got to be zombies!" Shaun of the Dead features numerous references to not only Romero films, but several other horror/science fiction movies too.

=== Fido (2006) ===
Directed by Andrew Currie. The film takes place after the zombie apocalypse, in a small, safe, idyllic 1950s-style town. In this film zombies are kept as slaves or pets, until something inevitably goes wrong.

=== Dance of the Dead (2008) ===
Directed by Gregg Bishop. The film is about a high school prom in Georgia which is unexpectedly interrupted when a graveyard, next to a power plant, becomes the sudden source of reanimated cadavers. As zombies march on the high school, a motley group of dateless teenage outcasts take on the zombies and save the day.

=== Zone of the Dead (2009) ===
Directed by Milan Konjević and Milan Todorović. Also known as Apocalypse of the Dead in the U.K. and the U.S., Zone of the Dead is a Serbian zombie horror film starring Ken Foree from the original Dawn of the Dead and its remake. The movie is in English and it has been released by Epic Pictures Releasing in America on September 1, 2012 under the title Apocalypse of the Dead. It has a cult status in some regions and a sequel is in development.

== Documentaries ==
=== Document of the Dead (1985) ===
Directed by Roy Frumkes. Document of the Dead is a 1985 documentary film that takes a look back from Romero's first television commercials onward and it chronicles his career and stylistic techniques.

=== Fan of the Dead (2003) ===
Directed by Nicolas Garreau. Fan of the Dead is a 2003 52-minute documentary road-movie revealing the filming locations of Night of the Living Dead, Dawn of the Dead, Day of the Dead and the Night of the Living Dead remake, with exclusive interviews with the cast of George A. Romero's trilogy.

Fan of the Dead was released on DVD/Blu-ray in the U.S./Canada (Cheezy Flicks), France (Bach Films), Italy (Millennium Storm), Germany (CMV Laservision), Spain/Portugal (Manga Films), Great Britain (Arrow Films) and Australia (Umbrella Entertainment).

Additional credits: Music by Sebastian Munoz and Antonio Martino; edited by Olivier Andre.

=== One for the Fire: The Legacy of 'Night of the Living Dead' (2008) ===
Directed by Robert Lucas (as Robert L. Lucas) and Chris Roe. One for the Fire: The Legacy of 'Night of the Living Dead' is a 2008 documentary film made to celebrate the 40th anniversary of George Romero's Night of the Living Dead. It features most of the main people behind the film, as well as a few of the lesser known people who had minor roles in the movie. Romero, John Russo, Russell Streiner, Judith O'Dea and Karl Hardman are among those interviewed.

Additional credits: Produced by Robert Lucas and Chris Roe; written by Billy Gram, Robert Lucas (co-creator) and Chris Roe (concept creator); music by Jess Bryden; cinematography by Robert Lucas; edited by Michael Felsher.

=== Autopsy of the Dead (2009) ===
Directed by Jeff Carney. Autopsy of the Dead is a 2009 documentary film that examines the living history behind Night of the Living Dead that has since attained the status of a cultural phenomenon.

Additional credits: Produced and written by Jeff Carney and James Cirronella; editing and Cinematography by Jeff Carney.

=== Cinemall (2011) ===
Directed by Gavin Shaw and Craig Belliveau. Cinemall is a 2011 short documentary film about the Monroeville Mall, the main location of Dawn of the Dead.

Additional credits: Produced and cinematography and editing by Gavin Shaw and Craig Belliveau; written by Gavin Shaw; music by Carlo Carosi.

=== Birth of the Living Dead (2012) ===
Directed by Rob Kuhns. Birth of the Living Dead focuses on the impact Night of the Living Dead had on pop culture.

== Living Dead in other media ==
Although the majority of the Living Dead media has been films, related projects have been released in other media. A handful of books and comics books take place in the Living Dead universe. As with the films, some of them are officially endorsed, while others are not.

=== Books ===
- Night of the Living Dead (1974), by John A. Russo. A novelization of the first film.
- Return of the Living Dead (1978), by John A. Russo. A stand-alone sequel to Night of the Living Dead, with few similarities to the eventual films of the same name.
- Dawn of the Dead (1978), by George A. Romero and Susanna Sparrow. A novelization of the second film.
- Return of the Living Dead (1985), by John A. Russo is a novelization of the film of the same name
- Book of the Dead (1989) and Still Dead: Book of the Dead 2 (1992), edited by John Skipp and Craig Spector. A series of two anthology books compiled by a number of authors, most notably Stephen King, with forewords written by Romero and Tom Savini.
- Night of the Living Dead (2009), by Christopher Andrews. Novelization of the first film, not authorized by Romero or Russo.
- Night of the Living Dead (2016), by Sean Abley. A Currently the newest novelization of the film
- Nights of the Living Dead (2017), edited by George Romero and Jonathan Maybury. This book, like Book of the Dead, is an anthology of stories from different authors. The events of the book take place during the night of the living dead.
- Epidemic of the Living Dead (2018), by John Russo.
- Spawn of the Living Dead: They're Back...and They're Hungry! (2019), by John Russo.
- The Living Dead (2020), by George Romero. This book Romero wrote before his death in 2017 after Romero's death, the book was completed by Daniel Kraus

=== Comics ===
- Toe Tags, (Note: Romero, George A. (w), Castillo, Tommy (p), Ramos, Rodney, Wrightson, Bernie (i). Toe Tags, no. 1–6 (December 1, 2004 (US) – May 1, 2005 (US)). US: DC Comics.) also known as The Death of Death is a six-issue comic book miniseries originally published from December 2004 to May 2005 by DC Comics which was based on an unused script by Romero. It was drawn by Tommy Castillo and Rodney Ramos, with covers by horror artist Berni Wrightson. Romero's story is actually based on an unused script for a sequel to his Dead films; the miniseries therefore follows his similar tropes: extreme gore, social commentary, evolving zombies, and the heroes riding off in the end into an unknown fate.
- Road of the Dead: Highway to Hell (IDW Publishing), the 2019 comic book prequel to the film Road of the Dead, written by Jonathan Maberry.
- The Rise (Heavy Metal), the 2021 prequel comic to Night of the Living Dead written by Romero's son G. Cameron Romero, depicting the origin story of the zombie outbreak. The project was originally intended to be a film, which started as an Indiegogo funding campaign in 2014 for Night of the Living Dead: Origins and later renamed Rise of the Living Dead. It is set at the height of the Cold War era, depicting a military scientist searching for a way to sustain human life in the event of a nuclear holocaust. Romero eventually scrapped the project and converted it into a comic book titled The Rise, to avoid potential studio interference and trademarking disputes. Chapters will be published individually in issues of Heavy Metal magazine, and then collected into a single graphic novel

Escape of the Living Dead series

- Escape of the Living Dead (Note: Russo, John (w), Verma, Dheeraj (p), Christensen, William (ed). Escape of the Living Dead, no. 1–6 (September 1, 2005 (US) – March 1, 2006 (US)). US: Avatar Press, ISBN 978-1-59291-034-2.) is a five-issue comic book miniseries originally published from September 2005 to March 2006 by Avatar Press and written by John A. Russo as a sequel to Night of the Living Dead.
- Escape of the Living Dead: Fearbook (Note: Wolfer, Mike (w), Mike Wolfer (a), Dalhouse, Andrew (col), Christensen, William (ed). Escape of the Living Dead: Fearbook, no. 1 (August 1, 2006 (US)). US: Avatar Press.) is a single issue comic book originally published August 2006 by Avatar Press and written by Mike Wolfer and is a sequel to Escape of the Living Dead.
- Escape of the Living Dead: Airborne (Note: Russo, John, Mike Wolfer (w), Verma, Dheeraj (p), Lalit (i), Dalhouse, Andrew (col), Christensen, William (ed). Escape of the Living Dead: Airborne, no. 1–3 (September 1, 2006 (US) – November 1, 2006 (US)). US: Avatar Press.) is a three-issue comic book miniseries originally published from September 2006 to November 2006 by Avatar Press and written by John A. Russo and Mike Wolfer and is a sequel to Escape of the Living Dead.
- Escape of the Living Dead Annual #1 (Note: Wolfer, Mike (w), Mike Wolfer (a), Dalhouse, Andrew (col). Escape of the Living Dead Annual#1, no. 1 (March 21, 2007 (US)). US: Avatar Press.) is a single issue comic book originally published March 2007 by Avatar Press and written by Mike Wolfer and is a sequel to Escape of the Living Dead.
- Escape of the Living Dead: Resurrected (Note: Russo, John (w), Verma, Dheeraj (a), Christensen, William (ed). Escape of the Living Dead: Resurrected (January 28, 2008 (US)). US: Avatar Press, ISBN 978-1-59291-047-2.) is a collection of the whole series originally published January 2008 by Avatar Press. It contains all 10 issues of the story: the original five-issue miniseries, the three-issue Airborne miniseries, the Fearbook, and the Annual.

==== Empire of the Dead ====
Empire of the Dead is a comic consisting of three acts of 5 issues each. The comic was written by George Romero for Marvel Comics, but unlike his films, this comic also features vampires in the plot.

Night of the Living Dead series

- Night of the Living Dead (2010 by John Russo)
- Night of the Living Dead: Prelude
- Night of the Living Dead (1991 by Tom Skulan)
- Night of the Living Dead (1994 by Noel Hannan)
- Night of the Living Dead 2011 Annual
- Night of the Living Dead Annual #1
- Night of the Living Dead: Back From the Grave
- Night of the Living Dead: The Beginning #1
- Night of the Living Dead Holiday Special #1
- Night of the Living Dead: Just a Girl
- Night of the Living Dead: New York
- Night of the Living Dead: Death Valley
- Night of the Living Dead: London
- Night of the Living Dead: Hunger
- Night of the Living Dead: Barbara's Zombie Chronicles
- Night of the Living Dead: Aftermath

The Walking Dead

- The Walking Dead (2003), a comic book account of a zombie-apocalyptic world written by Robert Kirkman. Robert Kirkman later stated that his series would have been called Night of the Living Dead, since it was in the public domain, as a way to get more recognition. The first page of the proposal had lines taken from Romero's film and the story was to have taken place in the '60s. Publisher Jim Valentino suggested Kirkman to change the title to something else, as it made no sense to create something under the title that could not be trademarked. Kirkman later said that Night would have been "the most inaccurate title The Walking Dead could have had". The hit television series The Walking Dead, based on the comic book series, premiered in 2010.

=== Video games ===
- Land of the Dead: Road to Fiddler's Green (2005), developed by Brainbox Games for PC and the Xbox. A first-person shooter licensed video game based on the George A. Romero zombie horror movie Land of the Dead.
- Dead Rising (2006), developed by Capcom for the Xbox 360. Contains exact parallels to Dawn of the Dead, being set in a zombie-filled shopping mall. The similarities are so conspicuous that a legal disclaimer was put on the game's packaging after a dispute with the MKR Group, holder of the rights to Dawn of the Dead, which was dismissed in court.
- In game INTO THE DEAD 2 had a "Night of the Living Dead" event to commemorate the 50th anniversary of the Living Dead franchise. The event is a prequel to the '68 film.
- In Capcom's Breath of Fire, a video game for the Super Nintendo Entertainment system, the town north of Winland, that Nina and the two winged soldiers must travel through, is infested with zombie-like creatures at night. This town is called "Romero".
