= Return of the Living Dead (film series) =

American zombie film series

- Created by: Dan O'Bannon
- Original work: The Return of the Living Dead (1985)
- Years: 1985–present

Films and television
- Films: The Return of the Living Dead (1985); Return of the Living Dead Part II (1988); Return of the Living Dead 3 (1993); Return of the Living Dead: Necropolis (2005); Return of the Living Dead: Rave to the Grave (2005)

Return of the Living Dead is an American zombie film series that consists of five films beginning with the 1985 film The Return of the Living Dead. The series follows groups of people struggling to survive outbreaks of reanimated corpses caused by a chemical that brings the dead back to life.

== Films ==
Return of the Living Dead films
Film	U.S. release date	Directed by	Written by	Produced by
The Return of the Living Dead	August 16, 1985	Dan O'Bannon	Dan O'Bannon; Story by: Rudy Ricci, John Russo, & Russell Streiner	Tom Fox
Return of the Living Dead Part II	January 15, 1988	Ken Wiederhorn	Ken Wiederhorn	Tom Fox
Return of the Living Dead 3	October 29, 1993	Brian Yuzna	John Penney	Brian Yuzna, John Penney, Lawrence Steven Meyers, & Gary Schmoeller
Return of the Living Dead: Necropolis	October 15, 2005	Ellory Elkayem	William Butler & Aaron Strongoni	Anatoly Fradis & Steve Scarduzio
Return of the Living Dead: Rave to the Grave	October 15, 2005	Ellory Elkayem	William Butler & Aaron Strongoni	Anatoly Fradis & Steve Scarduzio

=== The Return of the Living Dead (1985) ===
Medical supply warehouse foreman Frank (James Karen) informs his new protege, Freddy (Thom Mathews) that Night of the Living Dead was a true story, based on events that occurred when a gas (2-4-5 Trioxin) was released into the morgue in the basement of a VA hospital. The warehouse was the inadvertent recipient of several canisters, one of them containing a corpse – dubbed "Tarman" (Allan Trautman) due to his rotten appearance in thick black tar – sealed inside. Due to the canister's less than stellar durability, a light tap causes it to burst open, releasing Trioxin. The gas leaks out of control, which poisons Frank and Freddy and releases "Tarman" from his imprisonment but he goes into hiding, and remains unseen until halfway through the movie. Frank and Freddy awaken to discover that various body parts (and bodies) in the warehouse are now alive, as well as the cadaver locked in the freezer and even a split dissected dog. Unaware that they are slowly turning into zombies due to the effects of the gas, Frank and Freddy enlist the help of the warehouse owner, Burt (Clu Gulager), and his mortician friend, Ernie (Don Calfa), to cremate the cadaver's body parts (they had tried to chop it up to kill it). Unfortunately, the resulting smoke carries the evaporated Trioxin with it, which then mixes with an overhead raincloud. It rains on a nearby cemetery, resulting in the reanimation of the buried corpses.

The zombies differ in this movie, in that they are as fast, strong and intelligent as they were in their previous lives, and can form words even when they are merely very degraded bodies. Instead of hunting humans for their flesh, they hunt for the humans' brains, stating that brains can ease the pain of their decomposition. It appears that injuries to their brains do not have any effect, and the only way to fully destroy them is to cremate their bodies, although the ensuing smoke also spreads the contagious gas. It also seems that their bites are not infectious, as Suicide, who was killed by Tarman, never reanimated while Trash, killed by several zombies in the graveyard later, did reanimate, probably due to the contaminated rain falling on her corpse.

=== Return of the Living Dead Part II (1988) ===
The second film was written and directed by Ken Wiederhorn. The plot follows seven people as they attempt to escape their town after a mass of undead are awoken due to a barrel full of Trioxin gas that was left over from the first film. In this film, it is revealed that powerful electric discharges are the only secure way of destroying the zombies without the risk of reanimating more corpses (it seems the electric energy completely annihilates the re-animative effect of the Trioxin).

The film was released on January 15, 1988, and made $9m at the box office in the U.S.

=== Return of the Living Dead 3 (1993) ===
The third film was produced and directed by Brian Yuzna, who produced the Re-Animator film series. This film switches gears from the first two films' comedy/horror formula, instead being a romantic drama/teen romance/horror film. The story involves Curt, whose father, a Colonel in the US Army, is overseeing experiments being performed with Trioxin. After Curt's girlfriend, Julie, is killed in a motorcycle accident, he exposes her corpse to the gas, bringing her back to life as a zombie. Throughout the film, Julie, now one of the living dead, grows hungrier and hungrier for human brains. She discovers, though, that by causing herself pain via a series of more and more extreme body piercings with springs, nails, glass, basically whatever sharp objects she can find, that she can stave off, although only temporarily, the ghastly hunger growing within her. The two begin a trek to escape the US Army that ends in the city sewers when Curt, after witnessing Julie kill and eat Riverman, a friendly homeless man who gives them shelter, steps aside to let his father finally put Julie down. The film ends with Curt rescuing Julie from a fate worse than living death as a biomechanical killer for the military. In the end, after himself being bitten by a zombie, Curt and Julie step into an incinerator and embrace in a final kiss as the flames engulf them.

This film is currently available in its unedited form on Blu-ray in the U.S. and on the U.K. Region 2 DVD.

The film received a limited theatrical release on October 29, 1993, where it was a financial failure, making back only $54,000 of its $2,000,000 budget at the box office in the U.S.

=== Return of the Living Dead: Necropolis (2005) ===
Return of the Living Dead: Necropolis, the fourth film in the series, was filmed in Romania and Ukraine. The film stars Peter Coyote and Aimee Lynn Chadwick. The plot revolves around a group of teenagers attempting to rescue their friend from an evil corporation. In doing so, they wind up releasing a horde of bloodthirsty zombies. An edited version of the film aired on the SciFi Channel on October 15, 2005. The R-rated version of the film was released on DVD on April 18, 2006. The film was originally advertised as Return of the Living Dead 4: Necropolis but once it was finally released, the number 4 was removed from the title.

=== Return of the Living Dead: Rave to the Grave (2005) ===
Return of the Living Dead: Rave to the Grave was filmed immediately after Necropolis using the same locations of Romania and Ukraine. Cory Hardrict, John Keefe, Peter Coyote and Aimee Lynn Chadwick returned from the previous installment. The film takes place one year after Necropolis and the returning teenage characters, from the previous film, are now college freshmen. They discover that Trioxin-5 can be used as a recreational drug named 'Z', but the drug will eventually turn the user into a zombie. The speed of "zombification" depends on the dose of Trioxin consumed. An edited version of the film aired along with Return of the Living Dead: Necropolis on the SciFi Channel on October 15, 2005. As was the case with Return of the Living Dead 4: Necropolis switching to Return of the Living Dead: Necropolis, Return of the Living Dead: Rave to the Grave was advertised as Return of the Living Dead 5: Rave to the Grave before removing the number 5 from the title. The R-rated version of the film was released on DVD on March 20, 2007, by Lionsgate.

The film also features a humorous cameo appearance by Tarman from the original movie and its first sequel. However, as opposed to being a major threat like he initially was, the character is mostly used for comedy, though when he first appears in the film, he tries to attack the protagonists, but later gives up and desperately tries to hitchhike a ride to the party, but to no avail. After scaring away a woman who almost gave him a ride, he has no choice but to walk to the party, yelling his trademark "Brains!" as he goes.

=== Future and possible sequel ===
==== Return of the Living Dead (TBA) ====
In July 2023, a reboot of the franchise was announced. On December 13, 2024, WithAnO Productions and Living Dead Media LLC debuted a teaser trailer for Return of the Living Dead promising to be set in the winter of 1985, eighteen months after the events in the original film. An event was held in the London West Hollywood at Beverly Hills in December 2025, for various film industry workers, where a thirteen-minute scene of the film was exclusively shown. Written and directed by Steve Wolsh, the film was originally planned for a December 2025 release starring Devon Sawa, but it was later pushed back to November 2026 due to the filming taking longer than expected. It would miss its November 2026 release due to a lawsuit.

The current status of the film is unknown. In August 2026, a ruling in Los Angeles Superior Court found that the official chain of title for the 1985 movie resides with Metro-Goldwyn-Mayer and that Living Dead Media's 2017 application for motion picture production services was refused and ultimately abandoned in 2018. The court did note that Living Dead Media does possess registered rights "covering certain ancillary merchandise, including cosmetics, beverages, and costumes" but nothing in regard to film rights and production.

=== Documentaries and unofficial sequel ===
==== More Brains! (2011) ====
A documentary titled More Brains! A Return to the Living Dead, was released in 2011. The film is an account of the tongue-in-cheek, stylish and apocalyptic zombie movie, and features contributions from all the main cast as well as clips, photographs, storyboards, conceptual art, publicity materials, archival documents and behind-the-scenes footage.

The documentary includes interviews with over 30 cast and crew members from the first three Return of the Living Dead films, including Thom Mathews, Beverly Randolph, Jewel Shepard, John Philbin, Brian Peck, Linnea Quigley, Miguel A. Nunez, Jr., James Karen, Clu Gulager, Don Calfa, Allan Trautman, Stacey Q, William Stout, Suzanne Snyder, Michael Kenworthy, J. Trevor Edmond, Brian Yuzna and more.

The documentary is directed by Bill Philputt, written by the authors of The Complete History of The Return of the Living Dead, Christian Sellers and Gary Smart, produced by Thommy Hutson and executive produced by Beverly Randolph and Michael Perez for Michael Perez Entertainment and was released on October 18, 2011. The documentary is included on the UK special edition DVD and Blu-ray Disc of Return of the Living Dead, which was released on 4 June 2012.

==== Trash's Revenge and Return of the Living Dead: Aftermath (2026) ====
ROTLD Originals LLC and Richard Driscoll's DragonFlix initially announced a Return of the Living Dead sequel titled Trash's Revenge in 2024 with a crowdfunding page for the film launched on CineBacker in December 2024. The film was promoted as a narrative feature to showcase Linnea Quigley returning as the character Trash, alongside several actors from the original. The makers also announced the casting of Eric Roberts and promised to include deceased actors from the original film whose characters would be brought back using computer-generated imagery. In total, the film project raised over £75,000 from backers.

After two years with few updates, DragonFlix announced the film was now a documentary titled Trash's Revenge: The Linnea Quigley Story and would release it in November 2026.

However, the proposed sequel was released on the DragonFlix website on October 31, 2026, as Return of the Living Dead: Aftermath, and made heavy use of generative A.I. technology, despite actors having also recorded footage that was used for the film. Both Quigley and fellow cast member Beverly Randolph denounced the project, stating they were deceived by Driscoll and "this is not what we signed up for."

The documentary, titled Return of the Living Dead: Trash's Revenge – The Linnea Quigley Story, also followed, releasing November 20, 2026, on DragonFlix.

== Production ==
The series came about as a dispute between John A. Russo and George A. Romero over how to handle sequels to their 1968 film, Night of the Living Dead. The two reached a settlement wherein Romero's sequels would be referred to as the Dead movies, and Russo's sequels would bear the suffix Living Dead. Thus, each man was able to do what he pleased with the series, while still having one another's work distinct and be considered canon. Following this decision, Russo wrote a horror novel, Return of the Living Dead, which he planned on adapting into a film script. Although the film rights were initially sold in 1979, they were passed along by several different studios and directors before finally being obtained by Tobe Hooper, for whom Russo wrote a script. Hooper dropped out of the project, though, and the script never came to fruition.

Following Hooper's departure from the project, Russo, along with his new partner, Dan O'Bannon, wrote a new script, and adapted it into an accompanying novel. This project alleviated confusion by including a scene in which a character acknowledges the George Romero films and explains that while they are based on true events, the events of the Return series are the "true story". In addition to this separation of the storylines, the films in the Return series are markedly more comedic than Romero's films, with slapstick humor.

Although Russo and O'Bannon were only directly involved with the first film in the series, the rest of the films, to varying degrees, stick to their outline and "rules" established in the first film.

The fourth and fifth films in the series were filmed simultaneously near the Chernobyl nuclear power plant station in Ukraine. Despite being intended for a theatrical release edited versions of both films made their debut on the SciFi Channel on October 15, 2005, and were later released on DVD.

== Cast and characters ==
List indicators
- A dark grey cell indicates that the character was not in the film or that the character's presence in the film has yet to be announced.
- A ^{Y} indicates a role as a younger version of the character.
- An ^{O} indicates a role as an older version of the character.
- A ^{U} indicates an uncredited role.
- A ^{C} indicates a cameo role.
- A ^{V} indicates a voice-only role.
- An ^{A} indicates an appearance through archival footage or stills.

Character	Film				
Character	The Return of the Living Dead	Return of the Living Dead Part II	Return of the Living Dead 3	Return of the Living Dead: Necropolis	Return of the Living Dead: Rave to the Grave
Character	1985	1988	1993	2005	
Burt Wilson	Clu Gulager				
Frank Johnson	James Karen				
Ernie Kaltenbrunner	Don Calfa				
Freddy Hanscom	Thom Mathews				
Tina	Beverly Randolph				
Chuck	John Philbin				
Casey	Jewel Shepard				
Spider	Miguel Núñez				
Scuz	Brian Peck				
Trash	Linnea Quigley				
Suicide	Mark Venturini				
Tarman	Allan Trautman	Allan Trautman			Allan Trautman^{C}
Colonel Glover	Jonathan Terry	Jonathan Terry			
Ed Mathews		James Karen			
Joey Hazel		Thom Mathews			
Lucy Wilson		Marsha Dietlein			
Tom Essex		Dana Ashbrook			
Brenda Herzog		Suzanne Snyder			
Jesse Wilson		Michael Kenworthy			
Doc Mandel		Philip Bruns			
Billy Crowley		Thor Van Lingen			
Pussface' Zombie 'Thriller' Zombie 'Jaw' Zombie 'Eye-Pop' Zombie Zombie on Car Roof		Brian Peck			
Julie Walker			Melinda Clarke		
Curt Reynolds			J. Trevor Edmond		
Col. John Reynolds			Kent McCord		
Lt. Col. Sinclair			Sarah Douglas		
Col. Peck			James T. Callahan		
Becky Carlton				Aimee Lynn Chadwick	Aimee Lynn Chadwick
Cody				Cory Hardrict	Cory Hardrict
Julian Garrison				John Keefe	John Keefe
Uncle Charles				Peter Coyote	Peter Coyote
Zeke Borden				Elvin Dandel	Elvin Dandel
Jake Garrison				Alexandru Geoana	Alexandru Geoana
Jenny					Jenny Mollen
Aldo Serra					Claudiu Bleonț
Gino Corelli					Sorin Cocis
Jeremy					Cain Mihnea Manoliu

== Reception ==
=== Critical and public response ===
Film	Rotten Tomatoes	Metacritic
The Return of the Living Dead	71% (117 reviews)	66% (12 reviews)
Return of the Living Dead Part II	13% (31 reviews)	45% (6 reviews)
Return of the Living Dead 3	58% (12 reviews)	47% (5 reviews)
Return of the Living Dead: Necropolis	-	-
Return of the Living Dead: Rave to the Grave	-	-

=== Box office ===
Film	U.S. release date	Budget	Box office revenue			Ref.
Film	U.S. release date	Budget	United States	Other territories	Worldwide	Ref.
The Return of the Living Dead	August 16, 1985	$3,000,000–$4,000,000	$14,237,880	$932,000	$14,241,577	
Return of the Living Dead Part II	January 15, 1988	$6,000,000	$9,205,924	-	$9,205,924	
Return of the Living Dead 3	October 29, 1993	$2,000,000	$54,207	-	$54,207	
