= They Nest =

2000 American film

- Directed by: Ellory Elkayem
- Written by: John Claflin; Daniel Zelman
- Starring: Thomas Calabro; Dean Stockwell; Kristen Dalton; John Savage
- Music by: Vinny Golia
- Production company: The Kushner-Locke Company
- Distributed by: The Kushner-Locke Company
- Release date: July 25, 2000
- Running time: 92 minutes
- Country: United States
- Language: English

They Nest (also known as Creepy Crawlers) is a 2000 American science-fiction horror film directed by Ellory Elkayem and starring Thomas Calabro, Dean Stockwell, John Savage, and Kristen Dalton.

== Plot ==
Stressed by marital breakdown and alcohol problems, Dr. Ben Cahill freezes up under pressure in the emergency room. He is forced into taking a break by his superior and decides to unwind for a few months in the house his ex and he bought on Orr island, a fishing community off the coast of Maine.

Here, he starts examining, at the request of Sheriff Hobbs, some animal and human corpses with strange internal, as well as external, injuries.

The doctor observes that one of the red cockroaches that recently infested the island has pincers, which is most unusual. He reads up and contacts the university entomology department, where this African species is considered obscure. He finds that his house is also infested with these cockroaches.

Cahill is on the receiving end of local backlash, and one man, Jack, breaks into and attempts to trash his home but is killed by the cockroaches.

The sheriff allows Cahill to perform an autopsy on Jack, and he discovers that these cockroach-like insects burrow into people and nest inside them, liquifying the internal organs before bursting out of the host. At first, some of the townspeople begin to suspect that Cahill is responsible for the deaths of their friends, resulting in a mob attacking Cahill and locking his girlfriend Nell and him in jail. Meanwhile Sheriff Hobbs is attacked by Jack's brother, Eamon, when he attempts to stop them breaking into Cahill's home; he is locked in the basement and killed by the insects; his body is found after one local, Guy, attempts to free him.

When released from jail, Cahill and Nell immediately begin to evacuate the locals, beginning with Nell's mother and the children in her school class, although one pupil is missing. Cahill and Nell rescue him after finding his parents dead and discovering the cockroaches are nesting in a barn. They then flee back into town.

After they warn the reluctant locals of the danger, a swarm of the mutant insects is seen flying overhead. Now believing Cahill's story, they attempt to flee, but many perish, including Eamon and his goons. Cahill, Nell, Guy, and Henry get in a boat and try to reach the mainland, and are again attacked, but they turn the boat over and set a fuel pump alight, incinerating the bugs just as the military is called in to deal with the problem. However, one of the bugs had made it to the mainland, ending the film ambiguously, but setting up a sequel.

== Production ==
Based on this work, director Elkayem got to direct Eight Legged Freaks. The movie features Kristin Dalton in one of her first roles. She found the Canadian shooting location fun, albeit a bit long, and stated this was where she caught the acting bug.

== Reception ==
The Science Fiction and Horror review gave the movie two and a half stars, finding nothing new in the movie, but that the effects are very good and character building was a plus. TV Guide also found the movie formulaic, but also praised the directing. Similarly, Variety liked the effects, but found the movie to lack originality.
