= James Coblentz =

American film editor

- Occupation: Film editor

James Coblentz is a film editor most recognised for his work on the television series The X-Files. In 1994 he won an International Monitor Award for his work on the X-Files episode Beyond the Sea. In 1995 he was nominated for both an International Monitor Award and also an Emmy for the episode Duane Barry.

== Filmography ==
Editor
Year	Film	Director	Notes
1980	Foxes	Adrian Lyne	
1980	It's My Turn	Claudia Weill	
1982	Movie Madness	Bob Giraldi; Henry Jaglom	
1983	Still Smokin	Tommy Chong	
1984	Young Lust	Gary Weis	Second collaboration with Gary Weis
1984	Streets of Fire	Walter Hill	
1984	Runaway	Michael Crichton	
1988	Aloha Summer	Tommy Lee Wallace	
1991	The People Under the Stairs	Wes Craven	
1996	The Long Kiss Goodnight	Renny Harlin	Uncredited
2000	Final Destination	James Wong	First collaboration with James Wong
2001	The One	James Wong	Second collaboration with James Wong
2003	Willard	Glen Morgan	
2010	Super Hybrid	Eric Valette	
2010	Chain Letter	Deon Taylor	
2011	The Selling	Emily Lou Wilbur	
2011	The Howling: Reborn	Joe Nimziki	Direct-to-video
2012	Border Run	Gabriela Tagliavini	
2013	Curse of Chucky	Don Mancini	
2023	Replica	Paul Tully	

Editorial department
Year	Film	Director	Role	Notes
1977	The Ransom	Richard Compton	Assistant editor	
1980	Wholly Moses!	Gary Weis	Additional film editor	First collaboration with Gary Weis
1984	Runaway	Michael Crichton	Additional editor	
1988	The Drifter	Larry Brand	Additional editor	

Thanks
Year	Film	Director	Role
2015	Chasing Eagle Rock	Erick Avari	Very special thanks

TV documentaries

Editor
Year	Film	Director
1978	Bing Crosby: His Life and Legend	Marshall Flaum

TV movies

Editor
Year	Film	Director
1990	Murder in Paradise	Fred Walton
1990	Night Visions	Wes Craven
1991	Earth Angel	Joe Napolitano
2004	Species III	Brad Turner
2005	Return of the Living Dead: Rave to the Grave	Ellory Elkayem
2005	Return of the Living Dead: Necropolis	Ellory Elkayem
2012	American Horror House	Darin Scott

TV series

Editor
Year	Title	Notes
1980	Wild Times	2 episodes
1986	Heart of the City	1 episode
1989	A Fine Romance	2 episodes
1991	Quantum Leap	1 episode
1993−95	The X-Files	15 episodes
1995−96	Space: Above and Beyond	8 episodes
1996−97	Dark Skies	7 episodes
1997−99	Millennium	10 episodes
2001	The Fugitive	2 episodes
2003	The Guardian	2 episodes
2003	Miss Match	1 episode
2006	Blade: The Series	3 episodes
2006−07	Ghost Whisperer	6 episodes
2007	Numbers	1 episode
2007	Bionic Woman	2 episodes
2009	WWII in HD	10 episodes
2010	Tower Prep	3 episodes
2013	The Haves and the Have Nots	16 episodes
2014	Those Who Kill	4 episodes
2014	Intruders	3 episodes
2015	Reign	1 episode
2015	Hemlock Grove	4 episodes
2016	Angie Tribeca	1 episode
2005−17	Prison Break	5 episodes
2017	24: Legacy	1 episode
2017	Lore	2 episodes
2018	Designated Survivor	3 episodes
