= Julian Scott Urena =

Dominican actor

- Born: Dominican Republic

Julian Scott Urena is a Dominican actor.

Urena has appeared in films including Mixed Blood, Spike of Bensonhurst, the James Ivory directed Slaves of New York, The Bronx War, Falling Down, Return of the Living Dead 3, The Puppet Masters, The Pest, Get Smart, American Flyer and most recently playing the lead in Mark Christensen's "North By El Norte".

Television appearances include Jake and the Fatman and The Shield. He can also be seen in In the Company of Sinners which screened at the Monaco Charity Film Festival, Glass Tops, Shy and Something About Jack. He has also voiced three audio books, McKnight's Memory, Rock Star Rising (a.k.a. Hard Rock Lovers) and "The Mexican Swimmer" in which he played all the characters (7 plus).

He has appeared on stage in both New York and Los Angeles in productions, including Zeth Zvi Rosenfeld's The Writing on the Wall, Side Show, Homeboy, The King of Dominos, He Who Gets Slapped, The Watermelon Factory, Hips, The Have Little, Chingon and in Beverly Lloyd's Shallow Breathing.

Urena appeared as a series regular on the Web Series Caribe Road and in the Fox TV series Gang Related and Castle for ABC.
