= Brotherly Love (2015 film) =

2015 film

- Theatrical release poster
- Directed by: Jamal Hill
- Written by: Jamal Hill
- Produced by: Charles "Charlie Mack" Alston; Yaneley Arty; Ron Robinson; Shelby Stone and Jacob York
- Starring: Keke Palmer; Cory Hardrict; Quincy Brown; Romeo Miller; Eric D. Hill Jr. Macy Gray; Malik Yoba; Faizon Love
- Cinematography: Matthew Joffe
- Edited by: Jessica Hernández; Todd Wolfe
- Music by: Chris Paultre
- Production companies: Flavor Unit Films; Jacavi Films; Electric Republic
- Distributed by: Freestyle Releasing
- Release date: April 24, 2015
- Running time: 89 minutes
- Country: United States
- Language: English
- Budget: $2.3 million
- Box office: $478,595

Brotherly Love is a 2015 American coming of age drama film written and directed by Jamal Hill. The film stars Keke Palmer, Cory Hardrict, Eric D. Hill and Quincy Brown. The film was executive produced by Queen Latifah and Shakim Compere for her production company Flavor Unit Films, Electric Republic and Jacavi Film. Brotherly Love was distributed by Freestyle Releasing and had a limited theatrical release in the United States on April 24, 2015.

Set in Philadelphia and famed Overbrook High School, Brotherly Love follows high school basketball star Sergio Taylor as he struggles navigating the fame of becoming a star athlete. Sergio's older brother June saw his own dreams of becoming a basketball player fade away when he turned to the streets to provide for his family after his father's death. Sergio's twin sister Jackie saw her ambitions of having a music career side tracked after unexpectedly falling in love with Chris.

== Plot ==
The film starts with a hooded man getting out of the car and in the rain. He then goes into a house where he brutally shoots five boys hanging out.

Junior (aka June) wakes up and gives his younger brother Sergio some money for the day.

When they get to school, their sister Jackie meets up with her two friends, Trina and Simone, who has a child with June. They briefly talk about a boy named Chris and the upcoming school dance before Jackie goes off to the library. While at the library, Jackie meets Chris who offers to drive her home. When she gets home she is accosted by her mother, who is dealing with addiction since her father's death.

While rolling dice, June is confronted by a man whom is Zip's cousin. He warns June and others from the neighborhood that if they don't find the mystery shooter, he will hunt him down. They then get into a fight.

Sergio is hesitant about going with Sean and Dez to steal items from a house. Conflicted, he goes to his uncle Ron's barbershop for advice. Ron tells him that every child in Philadelphia has the potential but what they lack is the focus, and he shouldn't end up like his father or brother.

Jackie is dating Chris who shows up late and surprises her by getting her studio time to record a song written for her.

Sergio meets up with June for late night practice. June encourages him to remind him of their plan to make it leave the neighborhood for good.

Meanwhile, Bunch, one of June's best friends, is stuck in traffic when someone ambushes and kills him.

As June and Sergio return from the court just outside their house, they are stopped by two crooked assailants. Sergio escapes and June is dragged into the basement of his house. The assailants rob all the money June had been saving and then one of them shoots his mother who comes down stairs. June is later dragged out into the street and neighbors come outside. However, one of the neighbors fires at the assailants' car.

Meanwhile, Jackie and Chris leave the studio and they see the police outside Jackie's home. June tells Jackie that their mother had been shot and is taken to a hospital. An angry June sees Chris and tells him to leave. Sergio, June and Bunch's brother Peanut are together when June gets a call informing him about Bunch's killing.

Time passes as the Taylor siblings' mother heals. Jackie finds out she is pregnant and keeps it to herself. Sergio considers Dez's plan because he wants to help with the money problems. June warns Jackie to quit seeing Chris because of the war going on between them and the neighborhood. Jackie states the fact that it has nothing to do with her and Chris.

June has a discussion with his mother, who says he has always been there for them showing strength and endurance. She tells him to look after himself and ease up on Jackie because she will end up despising him.

After Sergio's basketball team wins the championship, June invites him to a party. While at the party, Chris is outside telling June that he has information to help find his mother's shooter and Bunch's killer. Gratefully, June invites Chris to the party.

After leaving the party, June and Peanut follow the lead assaliants and June ends up killing Zip's cousin.

Jackie is offered a gig to dance at Overbrook's Brook Ball prom. Sergio's coach announces and picks Jackie and Chris as the prom winners.

Dez and Sean convince Sergio, who is reluctant, to go steal from the house. They enter the house through the back door with a stolen key. Sergio goes upstairs for the jewelry and money but takes nothing. After the house alarm triggers, Sean and Dez are arrested while loading a TV in the car. As Sergio tries to hide, he is captured by an officer who sets him free.

Meanwhile at the dance, June takes Chris outside and Jackie tells him when he comes back she has something to tell him. June expresses his gratitude, gives him money with no strings attached, and promises to look after him. Chris says he didn't mean to fall in love with Jackie and fatally shoots June. Chris attempts to flee the scene and is surrounded by the police. Jackie and Sergio arrive and they discover an unconscious and bloodied June.

While the hill boys are playing poker, June leaves the house and comes back in the rain. One of the boys opens the door and opens fire at the boys. Chris there during the night of the killing and his cousin Omar was killed.

Two years later, Sergio and Jackie are back on good terms again. Sergio hands Jackie a letter from Chris in prison. Sergio visits his brother's grave and drives off.

== Cast ==
- Keke Palmer as Jackie
- Cory Hardrict as June
- Quincy Brown as Chris
- Eric D. Hill Jr. as Sergio
- Romeo Miller as Sean
- Logan Browning as Trina
- Macy Gray as Mrs. Taylor
- Malik Yoba as Coach
- Faizon Love as Uncle Ron
- Jay Lewis as Peanut
- Marc John Jefferies as Bunch

== Reception ==
On the review aggregator website Rotten Tomatoes, 60% of 5 critics' reviews are positive, with an average rating of 5.5/10.

== See also ==
- French language: Brotherly Love (film)
- List of black films of the 2010s
- List of hood films
