= Murder of Kelly Jamerson =

1995 murder in Los Angeles, California

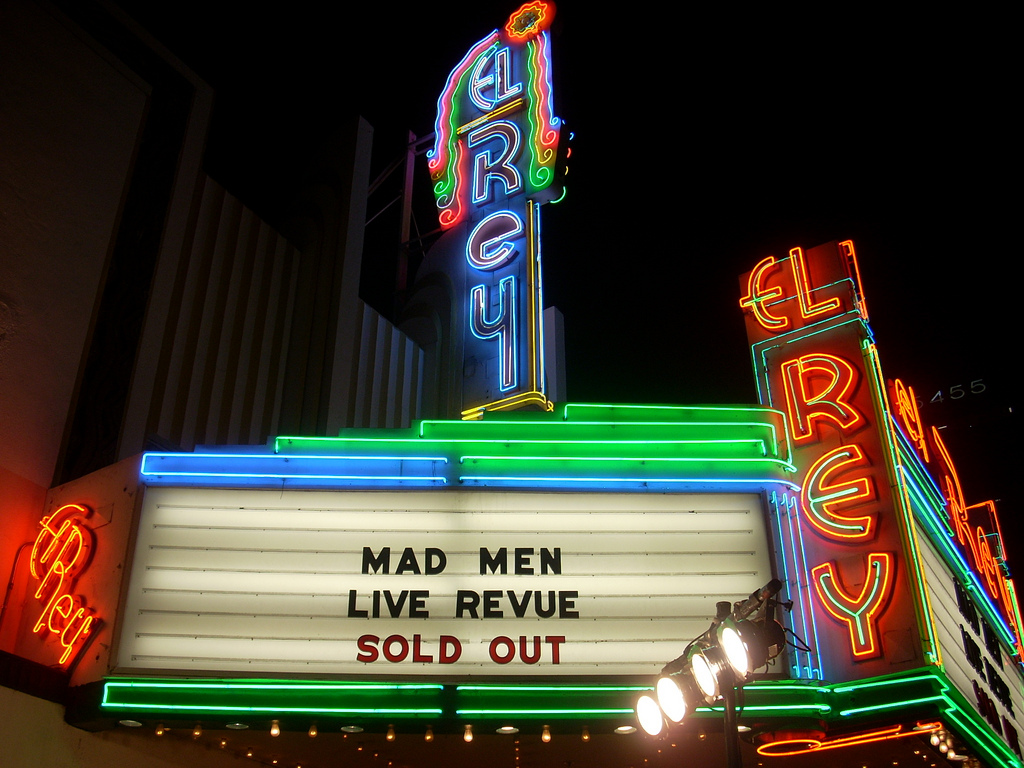
- Kelly Jamerson was severely beaten at a party hosted by Death Row Records in the El Rey Theatre
- Location: El Rey Theatre, Los Angeles, California
- Date: March 13, 1995
- Attack type: Beating
- Victim: Kelly Jamerson
- Perpetrator: Unknown

On March 13, 1995, Kelly Jamerson (May 29, 1966 – March 14, 1995), a member of the Rolling 60's Crips, was attending a private party hosted by Death Row Records, where he was severely beaten by a number of Bloods, following an argument. He subsequently died of his injuries the next day, at the Cedars-Sinai Medical Center.

== Events ==
On March 13, 1995, Death Row Records was hosting a private party in the El Rey Theatre, after the Soul Train Music Awards. Jamerson, who was a member of the Rolling 60's Crips, was invited. During the party, a fight broke out following an argument between Jamerson and several Bloods, who were allegedly from Suge Knight's inner circle. During this fight, Jamerson was beaten with chairs and bottles and was stomped on. According to one witness, Suge Knight stood by, watching Jamerson being beaten and shouted out “Ya’ll get that nigga.”

There were some off-duty LAPD officers present, who were working as security guards for Death Row Records. However, these officers left when the fight started. The injured Jamerson was taken to Cedars-Sinai Medical Center, where he was put on life support. He died the following day on March 14.

== In popular culture ==
- Jamerson is indirectly mentioned in DJ Quik's song "You'z a Ganxta" from his 1998 album Rhythm-al-ism. At the end of the song, DJ Quik states, "It's also dedicated to the little homie from 60's that lost his life at that party".
- In the 2018 film City of Lies, the beating of Jamerson at the Death Row Records party is depicted. Jamerson is portrayed by Cory Hardrict.
