= Madhouse (2004 film) =

- Directed by: William Butler
- Screenplay by: William Butler
- Story by: William Butler; Aaron Strongoni
- Produced by: Mona Vasiloiu; William Butler; Tom Fox; Henry Winterstern
- Starring: Joshua Leonard; Jordan Ladd; Natasha Lyonne; Lance Henriksen
- Cinematography: Viorel Sergovici
- Edited by: Stephen Semel
- Music by: Alberto Caruso
- Production companies: Lakeshore Entertainment; Madhouse Productions; Redbus Film Distribution
- Distributed by: Lions Gate Entertainment (United States and Canada); Redbus Film Distribution (United Kingdom); Lakeshore Entertainment (International)
- Release dates: August 3, 2004 (Nuremberg Fantasy Filmfest); February 22, 2005 (United States)
- Running time: 91 minutes
- Countries: United States; Romania; United Kingdom
- Language: English
- Box office: $1.4 million

Madhouse is a 2004 slasher film, directed and co-written by William Butler and starring Joshua Leonard, Jordan Ladd, Natasha Lyonne, Lance Henriksen, and Mark Holton. Its plot follows an intern who uncovers a series of murders at a rural psychiatric hospital. It’s an international co-production film between the United States, Romania and the United Kingdom.

It was released directly to DVD on December 20, 2004, in the United Kingdom and on February 22, 2005, in the United States.

== Plot ==
In 1989, a young boy attempts to escape from Cunningham Hall Mental Facility before getting hit by a car. Years later, psychiatric intern Clark Stevens arrives to Cunningham Hall to train before he can graduate to medical school. Inside, he meets some of the patients and is welcomed by Nurse Betty, who gives him keys and a walkie-talkie before taking him to the director of the facility, Dr. Albert Franks. On the way, however, they are interrupted by a patient named Carl, who claims that he "shouldn't be here," and that reformed patients are held as prisoners.

In Dr. Franks' office, Clark finds a book titled Psychology and the Paranormal, which implies connections between mental stability and the paranormal. Franks arrives and converses with Clark about the facility before introducing him to Dr. Morton and Dr. Douglas. Sara, a nurse, takes Clark on a tour of the facility. As they leave, mental patient Alice sits watching a window, where she sees a sinister-looking boy. Sara talks privately with head nurse Annabelle Hendricks before finishing the tour with the basement cells, where the most dangerous patients are kept—a place nicknamed "Madhouse." One of the patients attacks Clark with a shard of glass but is beaten down by Drake, a security guard. That night, Clark witnesses a young boy on the grounds of the hospital. Later, he observes Alice being physically abused by Nurse Hendricks. Clark sees the boy again and pursues him to the Madhouse but only finds Dr. Morton, who recalls a patient from Cell #44 who escaped but apparently died. Before Clark can continue, Hendricks arrives and gives him the task of cleaning a mess in the rec room.

Sometime later, Clark retells the Cell #44 story to Franks, who curtly dismisses him. When Clark leaves the office, he overhears Franks arguing with Nurse Hendricks about how "[she] knows." Soon after, Sara is requested at the nurses' station for night duty. In the nurses' station, Sara and Hendricks hear a mysterious sound. Hendricks, equipped with her stun-gun, investigates the source and is attacked by a cloaked figure who kills her by electrocuting her with a defibrillator.

The following day, Hendricks's body is discovered, and Franks assigns staff to interview patients about the murder. Clark is sent to the Madhouse to Cell #44, where the patient—who identifies himself as Ben London—implies the killer could be Franks. Sometime later, Clark asks Grace, the nurse in charge of medicine, about Ben's prescriptions. Grace replies that everyone in the Madhouse are on the same drugs, and Clark takes a bottle for examination. Sometime later, Clark attempts to confront Sara with some questions about the facility but is unable due to a nurse discovering Carl has hung himself.

In a meeting led by Clark and Sara, Alice discusses her visions of the young boy. Afterwards, Clark witnesses Drake having sex with a patient in an open room. Waking up the next morning, Clark gets a phone call from Sara that Drake is the murderer and has been arrested by the police. Taking Ben's advice, Clark discovers that Franks has been using placebos on patients and embezzling the hospital's funding. Meanwhile, the same figure that killed Hendricks kills Dr. Morton with an axe. The next night, Clark confronts Ben again and is only told, "The truth is right in front of you." Clark confides in Sara, who gives him drugged coffee that causes him to fall asleep. While dreaming, Clark is haunted by Ben's voice and visions of the little boy, before having a revelation that Sara is the killer.

Clark awakens and fights the effects of the drugs long enough to get back to the Madhouse to speak to Ben, only to realize that Ben is not actually there, and that he and the small boy have been figments of Clark's imagination. It is revealed that Clark—who is in fact Ben London—was a patient in the hospital as a child, and was presumed dead when Franks hit him with his car during an escape attempt; Ben impersonated Clark, a deceased medical student, to infiltrate the hospital. Ben goes to Franks' office and finds him destroying evidence of his embezzlement. Ben reveals his identity to Franks before butchering him with an axe. Sara witnesses the murder and flees to the Madhouse. Once inside, she pleads with Ben for her life, but he corners her and murders her, too.

Sometime later, Ben—again formally dressed—enters another unnamed psychiatric hospital.

== Cast ==
- Joshua Leonard as Clark Stevens
- Jordan Ladd as Sara
- Natasha Lyonne as Alice
- Lance Henriksen as Dr. Franks
- Dendrie Taylor as Nurse Hendricks
- Mark Holton as Mr. Hansen
- Patrika Darbo as Betty
- Christian Leffler as Drake
- Newell Alexander as Dr. Douglas
- Dan Callahan as Dr. Hendricks
- George V. Grigore as Scat Man
- Todd Stites as Trannie
- Rosemary Alexander as Grace
- Muffy Bolding as Polly Bond
- Adam Lazarre-White as Wallace

== Production ==
Madhouse was filmed on location in Romania in the summer of 2003, and was completed in July of that year.

== Release ==
Madhouse was released directly-to-video and DVD in the United Kingdom on December 20, 2004, and on February 22, 2005, in the United States by Lionsgate Films.

=== Box office ===
The film was released theatrically in some international markets, such as the United Arab Emirates, and grossed $1,446,859 internationally.

=== Critical response ===
On review aggregator Rotten Tomatoes, Madhouse holds an approval rating of 33% based on three reviews.

Jon Condit of Dread Central wrote of the film: "None of it very inspired, all of it feeling like pieces cut from some other film and Scotch Taped together to make this one. When Madhouse eventually runs out of tape and cinematic scraps to work from the writer (in this case, the director too) panics and resorts to a weak twist ending, a desperate last gasp that only backfires on the film and every story point to come before it."
