= William Butler (actor) =

American actor

- Born: United States
- Occupations: Actor; director; screenwriter

William Butler is an American actor, writer, director, make-up artist, special effects technician and producer.

== Early life ==
William Butler grew up working the carnival circuit that his parents owned and operated. When asked about what got him into acting he replied:

Yes I wanted to work in show business and did work in show business like school plays and things around the age of 7. As I got older I did local theater. A huge turning point for me was when I was little and went to see the original Poseidon Adventure film, I remember getting really freaked out by it that the boat was turning upside down and people were dying. My parents explained to me that these people were pretending that it was not really happening. I was like you have got to be kidding me and I became obsessed with filmmaking. Between 6th grade and high school I made close to 30 films, I got into video production, story boarding, animation, sculpting and I became a hard core fan. I would write fake notes from my parents to the movie theaters so that I could get in to see rated R horror films. It really just took off from there.

== Career ==
Butler is known for playing characters who are killed off in many of the horror films that he has appeared in. He has starred in Friday the 13th Part VII: The New Blood as Michael, Night of the Living Dead as Tom, Leatherface: The Texas Chainsaw Massacre III as Ryan, and as Ben in two episodes of the television show Freddy's Nightmares. He has claimed to be upset with how Return of the Living Dead: Necropolis and Return of the Living Dead: Rave to the Grave, the 4th and 5th installments of the Return of the Living Dead series that he wrote, turned out.

Butler authored a memoir entitled Tawdry Tales and Confessions from Horror’s Boy Next Door which was released in 2021.

== Filmography ==
=== Live-action roles ===
- Power Rangers: Lost Galaxy - Crumummy (voice)
- Power Rangers: Turbo - Maniac Mechanic (voice, uncredited)

=== Film ===
- Stay Tuned For Murder (1987) - Sergent
- Terror Night (1987) - Chip
- Ghoulies 2 (1987) - Merle
- Friday the 13th Part VII: The New Blood (1988) - Michael
- Arena (1989) - Skull
- Leatherface: The Texas Chainsaw Massacre III (1990) - Ryan
- Buried Alive (1990) - Tim
- Night of the Living Dead (1990) - Tom Bitner
- Spellcaster (1992) - Billy
- Watchers 3 (1994) - Tom
- Leather Jacket Love Story (1997) - Julian
- Dead Country (2008) - Narrator

== Crew work ==
=== Director ===
- Black Velvet Pantsuit (1995)
- Madhouse (2004)
- Costume Party Capers: The Incredibles (2004)
- Furnace (2007)
- Demonic Toys 2 (2010)
- 3 Bears Christmas (2019)
- Bunker of Blood: Chapter 8: Butcher's Bake Off: Hell's Kitchen (2019)
- The Three Bears and the Perfect Gift (2019)
- Crashing Christmas (2020) (TV Movie)
- Dead Voices (2020)
- The Resonator: Miskatonic U (2021)
- Baby Oopsie (2021)
- Beyond the Resonator (2022)
- Curse of the Re-Animator (2022)
- My Babysitter the Super Hero (2022)
- Baby Oopsie 2: Murder Dolls (2022)
- Baby Oopsie 3: Burn Baby Burn (2022)
- The Twelve Slays of Christmas (2022)
- Demonic Toys: Jack Attack (2023)

=== Writer ===
- Black Velvet Pantsuit (1995)
- Madhouse (2004)
- Return of the Living Dead: Necropolis (2005)
- Return of the Living Dead: Rave to the Grave (2005)
- The Gingerdead Man (2005)
- Furnace (2007)
- Gingerdead Man 2: Passion of the Crust (2008)
- Gingerdead Man 3: Saturday Night Cleaver (2011)
- Shine! (2015)
- Mama Don't Make ME Put On The Dress Again (2017) (Video short)
- The Lift (2018) (Short)
- Break Your Heart (2018) (Video short)
- 3 Bears Christmas (2019)
- Barbie & Kendra Save The Tiger King (2020) (Video)
- Barbie & Kendra Storm Area 51 (2020)
- Crashing Christmas (2020) (TV Movie)
- The Resonator: Miskatonic U (2021)
- Baby Oopsie (2021)
- Beyond the Resonator (2022)
- My Babysitter the Super Hero (2022)
