= Return of the Living Dead: Necropolis =

2005 film by Ellory Elkayem

- DVD cover
- Written by: William Butler; Aaron Strongoni
- Directed by: Ellory Elkayem
- Starring: Aimee-Lynn Chadwick; Cory Hardrict; John Keefe; Jana Kramer; Peter Coyote
- Music by: Robert Duncan
- Country of origin: United States
- Original language: English

Production
- Producers: Anatoly Fradis; Steve Scarduzio
- Cinematography: Gabriel Kosuth
- Editor: James Coblentz
- Running time: 89 minutes
- Production companies: Denholm Trading Inc. Aurora Entertainment; Castel Film Romania
- Budget: $6 million

Original release
- Network: Sci-Fi Channel
- Release: October 15, 2005

Related
- Return of the Living Dead 3; Return of the Living Dead: Rave to the Grave

Return of the Living Dead: Necropolis is a 2005 made-for-television horror film directed by Ellory Elkayem, starring Aimee Lynn Chadwick, Cory Hardrict, John Keefe, Jana Kramer, and Peter Coyote. It is the fourth film in the Return of the Living Dead film series.

An edited version of the film aired on the Sci-Fi Channel on October 15, 2005. The R-rated version of the film was released on DVD on April 18, 2006.

== Plot ==
Set 10 years after the events of Return of the Living Dead 3, the film starts with Charles Garrison traveling to Chernobyl (site of the 1986 Chernobyl nuclear disaster) to collect the last six canisters of Trioxin 5. Two Russian sellers take him to an empty power station containing the Trioxin. One of the Russians gets Trioxin on his hands, turning him into a zombie. Upon hearing screams, Garrison runs to see the zombie eating his partner and shoots the zombie in the head.

Julian and Jake "Pyro" Garrison, Charles's nephews, have been living with him since their parents were volunteers who died a year earlier at Hybra Tech. Julian spends a day at school while Charles experiments with the Trioxin, reanimating an arm. The next day, Julian leaves the house to go motorbiking with his friends, Cody, Becky, Carlos, Zeke, and Darren. During a stunt, Zeke falls and gets knocked unconscious.

Continuing his experiments, Charles reanimates a corpse and feeds it brains to keep it docile. However, some of the gas escapes through the vents into the lower levels of the building and reanimates a dead rat that two homeless men, Crusty and Joey, were eating, and it attacks them. Julian travels to the hospital where he was told Zeke would be taken and is told by a doctor that Zeke had an unexplained reaction to the painkillers and was pronounced dead on arrival.

One of Julian's other friends, Katie, Zeke's ex-girlfriend and a security operator at Hybra Tech, notices Zeke being brought in. She informs the others, and Cody hacks into the Hybra Tech website, where they discover that Zeke will be used as a test subject, so they decide to break in and rescue him. They manage to get in using fake identification and Katie giving them advice over walkie-talkies, while her promiscuous friend Mimi distracts their colleague Hector. Along the way, Carlos dispatches the zombified Crusty and Joey with a gun he had brought.

The group sneaks through the ventilation shaft and discovers that Jake has followed them. Exiting the vent, they find themselves in an armory. After some searching, they are found by Charles, who at gunpoint leads them through the facility hallways, where they discover holding cells full of zombies. They find Zeke in a holding cell and Carlos shoots the lock, allowing them to free Zeke, but also setting off an alarm.

Cody leads the group into a room of zombie clones in test tubes. Charles explains that they are to be the new test subjects and reveals that Julian's parents are alive and were being tested on here before they get distracted by a live test-tube zombie. Charles uses the distraction to escape and lock them in the room. Katie deactivates the alarm, but Carlos shoots the panel to escape the room, causing it to go off again. When Katie again tries to turn it off, a security failure releases all the zombies in the complex. Darren is killed during the chaos, and Zeke is bitten by a zombie before the group reaches the armory. They grab guns and climb back into the vents to escape.

Katie observes the outbreak and goes off to find Mimi and Hector so they can escape. While going through the vents, a zombie breaks through the floor, separating Julian, Carlos, and Cody from Zeke, Becky, and Jake. Zeke's group goes off to find a car in which to escape, while Julian, Carlos, and Cody resolve to try to find Julian's parents. Katie finds Mimi and Hector and tries to get them to escape, but the two are swarmed by zombies, forcing her to leave them behind. Julian's group reaches the building where Julian's parents are being held, fighting through the zombie horde. However, when the three are running for the elevator, Carlos gets stalled fighting a zombie. Another pops out before Carlos can get into the elevator, and he is eaten while Julian and Cody watch in horror.

Julian and Cody find Julian's parents as zombies in holding tanks, Julian's mom armed with circular saws and Julian's dad with wrist-mounted miniguns, to become "uber-soldiers". At Cody's insistence, Julian reluctantly agrees to leave, and they get chased by zombies up to the roof. A few minutes later, Charles appears and releases Julian's parents from their tanks. Julian and Cody rappel down the building; at the bottom, they encounter the zombified Mimi and Hector. Katie appears in a truck and runs the two zombies over. Julian and Cody get in the truck, and they go off to find the others.

In the meantime, Zeke, Becky, and Pyro make it to the parking lot and find keys to a jeep. As they drive down the road, Zeke turns into a zombie and tries to eat them, causing them to crash. Jake and Becky flee, fending off zombies in a running fight. Zeke attacks Becky, but Jake pushes her out of the way and is killed by Zeke in her stead. Becky sets him on fire with Jake's flamethrower, scaring him away. Katie's group arrives in the truck; they pick up Becky, and Julian reluctantly leaves his dead brother behind.

As they drive down the road, Julian's dad appears and shoots the truck with the minigun, taking it out. After he has finished shooting, Becky gets out and throws a grenade at him, apparently destroying him. They make it down the road, but encounter Zeke and Mrs. Garrison. Zeke starts a fistfight with Julian, while Cody and Becky dodge Mrs. Garrison's attacks. Becky lures Mrs. Garrison towards a power cable, where the latter drives the saw into the cable, electrocuting her. Julian is beaten down but manages to pull the pin to a grenade in Zeke's pocket, which blows Zeke up.

As the remaining zombies exit the front doors of the facility, a SWAT team arrives and shoots down the remaining horde. Mr. Garrison suddenly springs back up and shoots at the survivors with his remaining minigun. The SWAT team blows him up with a tank, but Katie is fatally hit. Cody and Becky are escorted into cars, while Katie dies in Julian's arms.

The movie ends with the SWAT team disposing of the bodies, and Charles escaping with the barrels of Trioxin. A newscaster reports about the zombie outbreak, which Hybra Tech denies. The newscaster is then attacked by a zombie before the screen goes black.

== Cast ==
- Aimee-Lynn Chadwick as Becky Carlton
- Cory Hardrict as Cody
- John Keefe as Julian Garrison
- Jana Kramer as Katie Williams
- Peter Coyote as Uncle Charles
- Elvin Dandel as Zeke Borden
- Alexandru Geoana as Jake Garrison
- Toma Danila as Carlos
- Diana Munteanu as Mimi Romero
- Serban Georgevici as Hector
- Gelu Nitu as Boris
- Claudiu Trandafir as Nicholai
- Boris Petroff as "Crusty"
- Constantin Barbulescu as Joey
- Răzvan Oprea as Darren
- Dan Astileanu as Garcia
- Lorena Lupu as Genie
- Esther Nathalie as Ms. Rayburn

== Reception ==
The film was called "the worst cinematic atrocity to wound your retinas" in Rue Morgue's 2006 year in review. Bloody Disgusting was a slightly more positive, "It might seem like Necropolis offers nothing special to the viewer, but the film still suggests a simpler time in Sci-fi and Horror, when a few gruesome effects, a cheap script job, and a cast of pretty-but-bland stereotypes could make a Friday night schlockfest seem like the best time ever. If for nothing else, Necropolis deserves a mountain of credit for giving it the old college try."
