= Leather Jacket Love Story =

- Directed by: David DeCoteau
- Written by: Rondo Mieczkowski
- Starring: Christopher Bradley; Sean Tataryn; Geoffrey Moody; Mink Stole; Nicholas Worth; William Butler; Arlene Golonka; Madame Dish; Erin Krystle; Craig Olsen; Momma
- Edited by: Jeffrey Schwarz
- Release date: 1997
- Running time: 85 minutes
- Country: United States
- Language: English

Leather Jacket Love Story is a 1997 film directed by David DeCoteau. The film tells the story of poet Kyle (Sean Tataryn) who wants to find true love with Mike (Christopher Bradley), a handsome, aggressive older man who Kyle met on a one-night stand. Mink Stole from Hairspray and Serial Mom fame plays Martine, and civil rights activist Morris Kight plays a cameo of himself. It is the first film by DeCoteau which falls outside of speculative fiction genres.

== Cast ==
- Sean Tataryn as Kyle
- Christopher Bradley as Mike
- Geoffrey Moody as Ian
- Hector Mercado as Sam
- Madame Dish as Madge
- Erin Krystle as Charella
- Craig Olsen as Amanda
- Mink Stole as Martine
- Nicholas Worth as Jack
- William Butler as Julian
- Momma as Waitress
- Arlene Golonka as Mom
