= Furnace (film) =

- Directed by: William Butler
- Written by: William Butler; Aaron Strongoni
- Produced by: Scott Aronson; Anghus Houvouras; Eric Tomosunas
- Starring: Danny Trejo; Michael Paré; Jenny McShane; Tom Sizemore; Ja Rule; Kelly Stables; Paul Wall; Mike Jones
- Cinematography: Viorel Sergovici
- Edited by: M. Scott Smith
- Music by: Haavard Christopher Hana; Noah Sorota
- Production company: Melee Studios
- Release date: December 11, 2007
- Running time: 90 minutes
- Country: United States
- Language: English

Furnace is a 2007 horror film written and directed by William Butler. It stars Danny Trejo, Michael Paré, Tom Sizemore, Ja Rule, and Paul Wall.

== Plot ==
When a long-closed wing of the maximum-security Blackgate Prison is reopened to accommodate an overflow of inmates, a series of mysterious deaths and apparent suicides begins to occur. Detective Michael Turner is brought in to investigate the incidents. He soon discovers that the casualties are centered around the prison's old furnace room.

Through his investigation, Turner uncovers a decades-old cover-up regarding the prison's dark history. He learns that the spirit of a former inmate, who was brutally murdered in the furnace, has been awakened and is seeking revenge. The vengeful entity targets both the new inmates, including a tough prisoner named Fury, and the prison guards, such as Frank Miller, who eventually suffers a violent breakdown and begins shooting at prisoners. As the death toll rises within the sealed facility, Turner pieces together the identity of the spirit and the exact circumstances of the historical cover-up. The film culminates in a final confrontation in the furnace room, where Turner must find a way to expose the truth and stop the supernatural killings before he becomes the next victim.

== Cast ==
- Michael Paré as Detective Michael Turner
- Ja Rule as Terrence Dufresne
- Jenny McShane as Dr. Ashley Carter
- Danny Trejo as Fury
- Tom Sizemore as Frank Miller
- Kelly Stables as Karen Bolding
- Paul Wall as Joey Robbins
- Mike Jones as Detective James Fury

== Production ==
The original script for Furnace was written by Anghus Houvouras, and the project was brought up to director William Butler, who thought that the story was reminiscent of the 1988 film Prison. Butler signed to direct, and he and his writing partner Aaron Strongoni collaborated to polish the script to meet Melee Entertainment's budgetary concerns. The rewriting lasted six months and changed the story substantially. Butler said of the change, "This of course was no reflection on Anghus, but instead the team of people at Melee that sort of took the film in another direction."

== Release ==
Furnace had an initial release on December 11, 2007. The film was subsequently distributed in the direct-to-video market, with Melee Studio officially releasing it on DVD on February 12, 2008. The film was released on DVD by Melee Studio on February 12, 2008.

== Reception ==
Critical reception for the film has been mostly negative.

Dread Central awarded the film a score of 2.5 / 5 stating "All in all, Furnace is just another blah horror entry to clutter the direct-to-DVD market. As if the floating head cover weren't enough on its own to dissuade you from picking it up believe me, this furnace is just blowing smoke". David Johnson from DVD Verdict gave the film a negative review criticizing the film's first half as being too slow and stated that the film would likely disappoint horror fans.
