= Creature Unknown =

- Directed by: Michael Burnett
- Written by: Scott Zakarin; Eric Mittleman
- Starring: Chase Masterson
- Release date: 2004
- Country: United States
- Language: English

Creature Unknown is a 2004 American horror film directed by Michael Burnett and starring Chase Masterson.

== Plot ==
A group of friends go to forest to spend a weekend, but the weekend turns into a fight with an inhuman creature.

== Cast ==
- Chase Masterson as Kat
- Maggie Grace as Amanda
- Cory Hardrict as Lance
- Betty Okino as Coral
- John Keyser as Sean
- Chris Hoffman as Steve
- Matt Hoffman as Wes
- Kristen Herold as Ally
- Ella Bowman as Rachel
