= Robert Duncan (composer) =

Canadian composer

- Born: Toronto, Ontario, Canada
- Occupation: Composer
- Instruments: Organ, trumpet, drums, piano, guitar
- Website: robertduncan.com

Robert Duncan (born 1971 in Toronto, Ontario) is a composer of film and television music. He has composed music for such TV series as Buffy the Vampire Slayer and Castle, as well as films such as Butterfly on a Wheel and Into the Blue 2: The Reef. He has been associated with writer/producer Shawn Ryan, composing some of his produced TV shows including The Unit, Lie to Me, Timeless and more recently S.W.A.T.. He has received fourteen ASCAP awards.

== Early life ==
Born and raised in Toronto, Ontario, Canada, Duncan was born into a family with deep musical history. His great-grandfather arranged music for silent films in England, and other relatives were closely affiliated with two of England's prominent composers, Ralph Vaughan Williams and Benjamin Britten. As a child he attended the Claude Watson School of the Performing Arts and in sixth grade he composed his first piece of music. At age 16 in high school, he landed his first gig scoring a promotional video for the local Board of Education. As an extra-curricular activity, Duncan studied the pipe organ and trumpet before later earning a bachelor's degree in music at York University.

== Career ==
After graduating, Duncan spent the next five years apprenticing with two Canadian composers and participated in the ASCAP Film Scoring Workshop. He wanted to do more, wanted to write scores for live orchestra, but he thought the chances of succeeding in Canada were slim, so in 2001 he moved to Hollywood, Los Angeles. Shortly after this move, Duncan was hired as a series composer on Buffy the Vampire Slayer. After the show ended, he started to land his own television and film scoring assignments. Landing many small-screen projects including The Chicago Code, Terriers, The Gates, Lie to Me, The Unit, Point Pleasant, Tru Calling, and S.W.A.T., he is best known for his work on Castle.

== Instruments ==
Duncan uses a variety of traditional and peculiar objects and instruments to create his scores. These objects include grand pianos, deconstructed pianos, metal brushes, hot-rod exhaust pipes, fire extinguishers, trumpet, guitar, pipe organ, a variety of drums, and even objects from junk yards all over Los Angeles.

== Cameos ==
Duncan made on-screen appearances on Castle season 4, episode 14 “The Blue Butterfly” in the opening scene as a jazz club pianist on the baby grand piano as well as season 8, episode 8 "Mr. and Mrs. Castle" as a cruise-ship pianist.

== Scores ==
=== Television series ===
Year	Show	Notes
1996	PSI Factor: Chronicles of the Paranormal	Co-composed with Lou Natale
2001	Starhunter	
2001	Blue Murder	Co-composed with Lou Natale
2002	Buffy the Vampire Slayer	
2003	Tru Calling	
2005	Point Pleasant	
2006	The Unit	
2006	Vanished	
2009	Castle	
2009	Lie to Me	
2010	The Gates	
2010	Terriers	
2011	The Chicago Code	
2012	Last Resort	
2012	Missing	
2014	Rush	
2016	The Family	
2016	Mad Dogs	
2016–2018	Timeless	
2017–2023	S.W.A.T.	
2018	The Crossing	
2018	Take Two	
2021–2023	The Equalizer	
2023	The Night Agent	

=== Film ===
Year	Film
2005	Return of the Living Dead: Rave to the Grave
2005	Return of the Living Dead: Necropolis
2007	Butterfly on a Wheel
2009	Into the Blue 2: The Reef
2011	The Entitled
2017	Spark
