= J. Trevor Edmond =

American actor

- Born: Jerome Trevor Edmond; September 28, 1969 (age 56); Encino, California, U.S.
- Other name: Trevor Edmond
- Occupation: Actor

Jerome Trevor Edmond (born September 28, 1969) is an American actor appearing in film and television.

== Early life ==
Edmond was born Jerome Trevor Edmond in Encino, California.

== Career ==
Edmond has made appearances in Beverly Hills, 90210, CBS Schoolbreak Special, ABC Afterschool Special, Dead at 21, The Good Life, Silk Stalkings, Matlock, and Alien Nation. Edmond also appeared in the films Meatballs 4 (1992), Return of the Living Dead 3 (1993), Pumpkinhead II: Blood Wings (1994), Higher Learning (1995) and Lord of Illusions (1995).

Edmond was featured in the Return of the Living Dead documentary, More Brains! The Return to the Living Dead, released in October 2011.

== Filmography ==
=== Film ===
Year	Title	Role	Notes
1988	For Keeps	Ace	
1990	Fatal Charm	Robert Fowler	
1992	Meatballs 4	Howie Duncan	
1992	No Place to Hide	Andrew	
1993	Return of the Living Dead 3	Curt Reynolds	
1993	Pumpkinhead II: Blood Wings	Danny Dixon	
1995	Higher Learning	Eddie	
1995	Lord of Illusions	Young Butterfield	
1999	Guinevere	Jeremy	Uncredited

=== Television ===
Year	Title	Role	Notes
1989	Who's the Boss?	Philip	Episode: "Boozin' Buddies"
1989	My Two Dads	Chopper	Episode: "Dirty Dating"
1989	Good Morning, Miss Bliss	Rick	Episode: "Clubs and Cliques"
1989	Alien Nation	Blentu	Television film
1989	Alien Nation	Blentu	3 episodes
1990	The Outsiders	Doyle	Episode: "Mirror Image"
1990, 1996	CBS Schoolbreak Special	Kevin	2 episodes
1991	Matlock	Blessing	Episode: "The Defense"
1993	Silk Stalkings	Darren Langford	Episode: "Crush"
1993	Frogs!	Nathan	Television film
1994	The Good Life	Mark	Episode: "Bob's Field Trip"
1994	Dead at 21	Eggs	Episode: "Live for Today"
1994	ABC Afterschool Special	Evan	Episode: "Boys Will Be Boys"
1994	Where Are My Children?	David, age 18	Television film
1997	Beverly Hills, 90210	Evan Potter	4 episodes
1997	Pacific Palisades	Michael Kerris	13 episodes
