= Cory Hardrict =

American actor (born 1979)

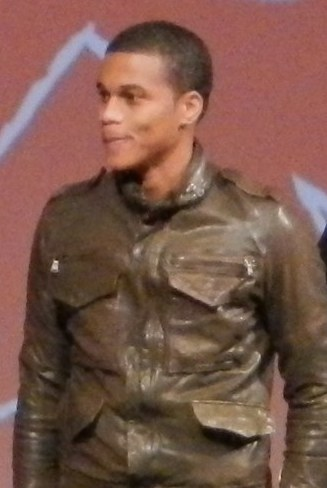
- Hardrict in 2013
- Born: November 9, 1979 (age 46); Chicago, Illinois, U.S.
- Occupations: Actor, producer
- Years active: 1996–present
- Spouse: Tia Mowry (m. 2008; div. 2023)
- Children: 2

Cory Hardrict (born November 9, 1979) is an American actor. He has appeared in film and television since the late 1990s.

== Personal life ==
Hardrict was born in Chicago, Illinois. After dating for six years, he and actress Tia Mowry became engaged on Christmas Day, 2006. On April 20, 2008, they married in Santa Barbara, California. In 2011, Mowry's first pregnancy was chronicled on the reality TV show Tia & Tamera starring her and her twin sister on the Style Network. Hardrict and Mowry have a son named Cree Taylor born on June 28, 2011, and a daughter named Cairo Tiahna who was born on May 5, 2018. On October 4, 2022, it was announced that the pair had separated due to irreconcilable differences. They finalized their divorce in April 2023.

== Career ==
Hardrict began his career on television during the late 1990s, with appearances in weekly prime-time programs including Smart Guy, That's So Raven, Felicity, Once and Again and ER. He made his film debut in the 1999 romantic comedy Never Been Kissed, starring Drew Barrymore, followed by a role in the drama Crazy/Beautiful (2001). Hardrict has also appeared in Creature Unknown (2004), Miles from Home (2006), and Driftwood (2006).

In 1999, Hardrict co-starred in the film Hollywood Horror with his future wife Tia Mowry and her twin sister Tamera Mowry. In 2007, he had a recurring role on the ABC Family series Lincoln Heights and executive produced the film Neighborhood Watch, in which he also starred. The following year, Hardrict had a supporting role in the film Gran Torino directed by and starring Clint Eastwood. That same year, he was cast as singer Brandy's love interest in the music video for her song "Right Here (Departed)".

In 2009, he appeared in the romantic comedy He's Just Not That Into You, and the drama Dough Boys. Hardrict also had a guest appearance on the CW show The Game (alongside then-wife Tia Mowry) as the cable guy in the "Hill Street Blues" episode. Hardrict later appeared as Ryan in the pilot episode of the CBS sitcom Accidentally on Purpose. However, he was subsequently replaced by Pooch Hall (his then-wife's co-star from The Game).

In 2014, Hardrict had a role in the film American Sniper, which reunited him with director Clint Eastwood. In 2015, he played June, the older brother who takes care of his family by any means necessary, in the film Brotherly Love co-starring Keke Palmer and Eric D. Hill Jr. In 2017, he portrayed Jacques Agnant in the Tupac Shakur biopic titled All Eyez on Me, alongside Demetrius Shipp Jr., Danai Gurira and Money-B.

== Filmography ==
=== Film ===
Year	Title	Role	Notes
1999	Never Been Kissed	Packer	
2001	Crazy/Beautiful	Wilcox	
2004	Creature Unknown	Lance	
2005	Return of the Living Dead: Necropolis	Cody	
2005	Return of the Living Dead: Rave to the Grave	Cody	
2005	Hollywood Horror	Stacy	
2006	Miles from Home	John Conway	
2006	The Contract	-	
2006	Driftwood	Darryl Jones	
2007	Neighborhood Watch	James	
2008	Gran Torino	Duke	
2009	The Least Among You	Roscoe	
2009	He's Just Not That Into You	Tyrone	
2009	Dough Boys	Smooth	
2011	Battle: Los Angeles	Lockett	
2011	The Day	Henson	
2011	Dance Fu	TK	
2013	Warm Bodies	Kevin	
2013	Lovelace	Frankie Crocker	
2014	Transcendence	Joel Edmund	
2014	American Sniper	'D' / Dandridge	
2015	Brotherly Love	June	
2016	Car Dogs	Boyd	
2016	Destined	Sheed / Rasheed	
2016	Spectral	Sgt. Alessio	
2017	Walk of Fame	Nate	
2017	All Eyez on Me	Nigel	
2017	Naked	Drill	
2017	November Criminals	D Cash	
2018	211	Officer Hanson	
2018	City of Lies	Kelly Jamerson	
2020	The Outpost	Sgt. Vernon Martin	
2021	Karen	Malik	
2023	To Live and Die and Live	Akil	
2023	Young. Wild. Free.	Desmond	
2023	American Outlaws	Agent Morely	
2024	Divorce in the Black	Dallas	

=== Television ===
Year	Title	Role	Notes
1997	Smart Guy	Kid	Episode: "Dateline"
1998	Felicity	R.A. No. 4	Episode: "Drawing the Line: Part 1"
1998	ER	Lil 'Toine	Episode: "Split Second"
1999	Once and Again	James	Episode: "Outside Hearts"
2000	Chicago Hope	Joe Williams	Episode: "Painful Cuts"
2000	Pacific Blue	Ty Davis	Episode: "A Thousand Words"
2000	City of Angels	Jamon	Episode: "Nathan's Hot Dog"
2001	Angel	Ray	Episode: "The Thin Dead Line"
2001	Boston Public	John	Episode: "Chapter Twenty-Two"
2001	Go Fish	Letterman	Episode: "Go Wrestling"
2001	The Huntress	Jiks	Episode: "Showdown"
2001	That's Life	Carl Morris	Episode: "The Devil and Miss DeLucca"
2002	Any Day Now	Mike	Episode: "Just the Beginning: Part 2"
2002	The District	Kenny	Episode: "Payback"
2002	NYPD Blue	-	Episode: "Death by Cycle"
2003	Strong Medicine	-	Episode: "PMS, Lies and Red Tape"
2003	CSI: Miami	Darnell Jackson	Episode: "Dead Woman Walking"
2003	The Shield	Louis	Episode: "Coyotes"
2003	ER	Curtis	Episode: "Foreign Affairs"
2003	Cold Case	Officer Joe Washington	Episode: "The Runner"
2003	Law & Order	Henry Lift	Episodes: "Blaze" & "Identity"
2004	Like Family	Tony	Episodes: "My Two Moms" & "Ladies Night"
2004	CSI: Crime Scene Investigation	Ross Davis, Biker	Episode: "Early Rollout"
2004	Without a Trace	Gerald Billingsley	Episode: "Trials"
2005	Boston Legal	Billy Jr.	Episode: "Gone"
2006	Shark	Marcus Jones	Episode: "LAPD Blue"
2007	CSI: NY	Luther Fields	Episode: "One Wedding and a Funeral"
2007	Heroes	Hype Wilson	Episodes: "Truth & Consequences" & "Powerless"
2007	K-Ville	Terence Jackson	Episodes: "Critical Mass" & "Game Night"
2007–2008	Lincoln Heights	Luc Bisgaier	Recurring cast: seasons 2–3
2009	The Game	Tony the Cable Guy	Episode: "Hill Street Blues"
2009	NCIS	Officer Porter	Episode: "Legend: Part 1 & 2"
2010	Saving Grace	Dylan Putnam	Episode: "Am I Gonna Die Today?"
2010	Dark Blue	Josh	Episode: "Shell Game"
2012	Let's Stay Together	Derrick	Episode: "The Choice Is Yours"
2013	Eastbound and Down	Walter	Episode: "Chapter 22"
2018–2019	The Oath	Cole Hammond	Main cast
2019–2020	S.W.A.T.	Nate Warren	Recurring cast: season 3
2020–2025	The Chi	Dante	Guest: season 3, recurring cast: seasons 4–7
2021	All American	Coach Marcus Turner	Episode: "Homecoming"
2022–2024	All American: Homecoming	Coach Marcus Turner	Main cast
