= Dheeraj Verma =

Indian comic book artist/creator (1967–2021)

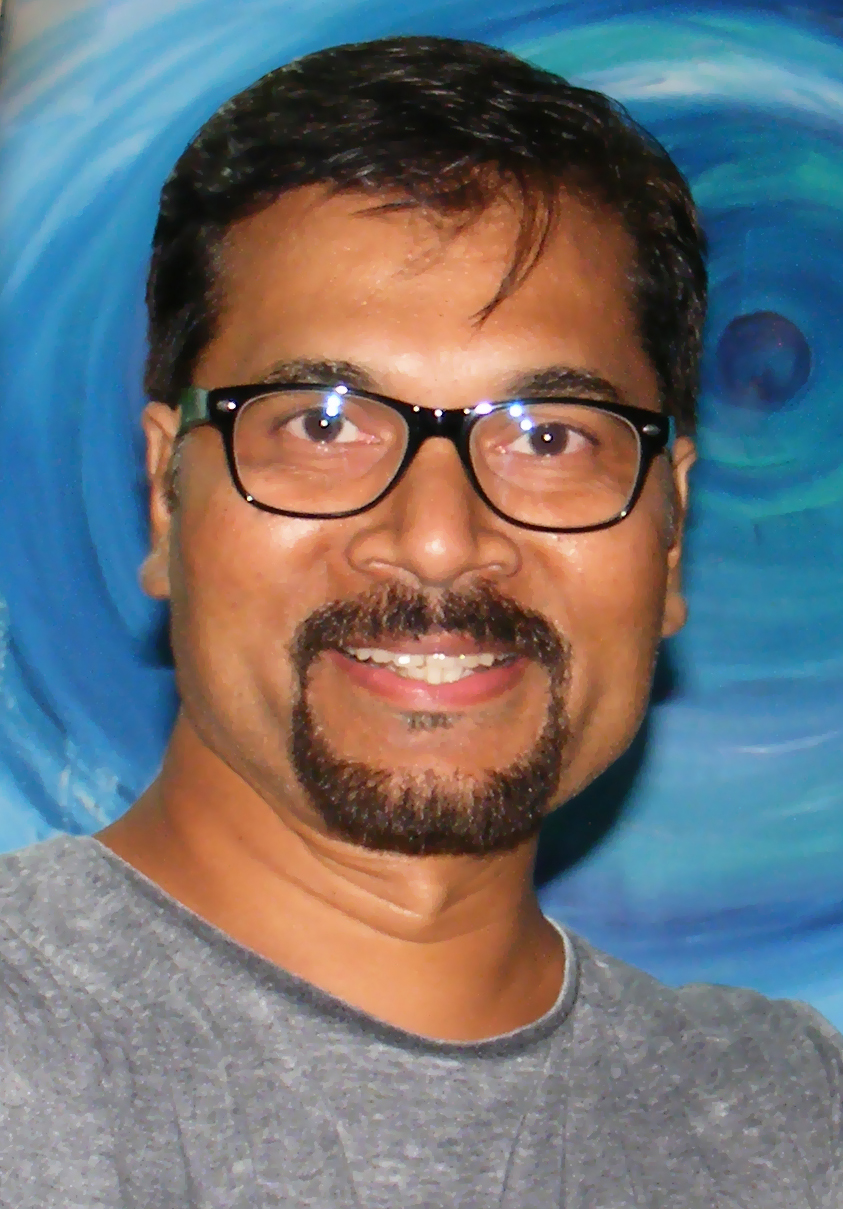
- Born: 22 October 1967; New Delhi, India
- Died: 7 June 2021 (aged 53); Delhi, India
- Occupation: Comic book artist/creator
- Spouse: Malti Verma (m. 1991)
- Children: 2

Dheeraj Verma (22 October 1967 – 7 June 2021) was an Indian comic book artist and creator. He is often credited with being the first Indian to enter the US comics industry.

== Early life ==
Dheeraj Verma was born on 22 October 1967, in Delhi, India. He attended school at N P Boys Sr Secondary School and graduated from Pannalal Girdharlal Dayanand Anglo Vedic College, University of Delhi in 1991. Dheeraj spent his life in the heart of the capital, Connaught Place. As an aspiring artist he started drawing "The Phantom, Batman and Superman" in his 3rd grade. He was quite impressed with "The Phantom and Flash Gordon" which became his inspiration to draw.

== Career ==
Verma started his career as an illustrator in the Indian comic industry in 1991 with the New Delhi-based publishers Parampara Comics and Fort Comics. He was noticed by the industry with Divaystro Ka Raja, Ajoobey (Parampara Comics) and garnered more attention from the Indian comics industry with the comics Jangaroo (Fort Comics). Later, in December 1993, he moved on to Raj Comics, the leading Indian comic company of the time. There he created his famous one-of-a-kind wolfman character Bheriya. Bheriya (wolfman) represents Verma’s immense love and dedication towards wild life and nature, which have always been the strongest aspects of his lifestyle. His debut issue in Raj Comics was Bheria Aya in 1994. He also wrote as well as illustrated its initial issues which were a huge hit such as Wolfano, Grahano, Lazy, Tilangey and many more. He worked on almost all the major Raj comics characters as an artist. His best selling comics were from the 90’s, and all of them were drawn by him. He also worked on covers, posters, trading cards, pin-ups, and other promotional merchandising for Raj comics. Verma was the first artist to introduce digital coloring to the Indian comic industry in 1996 on Parmanu's cover and then Bheria's Digest. He worked with Raj comics until April 2000. He joined a gaming company Escosoft Tech. (Division of Escort) as a senior visualizer and worked there for three years until June 2003.

In 2004, he got his big break in the American comic industry with Avatar Press where he worked as an artist for writer Joe R. Lansdale on By Bizarre Hands. His biggest series with Avatar was Escape of the Living Dead, Plague of the Living Dead, Yuggoth Creatures, Nightmare on Elm Street, and Night of the Living Dead. He also worked on Dynamite’s The Complete Dracula series written by Alan Moore’s daughter Leah Moore. He also did cover art for Marvel Comics's invincible Iron Man. He worked on Transformers' series published by IDW Publications. His first series for IDW Transformers: Fall Of Cybertron was a superhit series on ComiXology, which was launched in August 2012. After this series he worked on Transformers: Robots in Disguise # 19 in July 2013 and it entered in Top 300 comics.

He has done up to 14 issues of Lady Death.

He was working on Conan the Slayer (Dark Horse comics, USA), as a penciller.

In January 2013, after a decade away, Verma made his comeback in the Indian comic industry with Jaljeevni (Bheria Series) from Raj Comics. Subhasya Sheegram (Doga), Sarvanayak series was his latest project with Raj Comics.

Verma also ventured to exhibit his painting in the world renowned Indian Government national academy of fine arts Lalit Kala Akademi in Delhi, and caused quite a buzz in the fine art circle by introducing original comics pages from Transformers and Lady Death in the gallery in a seven-day exhibition, which was inaugurated by Mr. Taj Hassan, Special Commissioner of Police.

== Personal life and death ==
Verma married Malti Verma in 1991 and had two daughters. Verma died on 7 June 2021, in Delhi from pulmonary fibrosis complicated by a COVID-19 infection.

== Works ==
A:

- A Nightmare on Elm Street: Fearbook
- Amanecer Zombie

B:

- Bheria Series - Titles

1. Bheria

2. Bheria Aaya

3. Elephanto

4. Green Gold

5. Bhura Billa

6. Blast

7. Lazy Bheria

8. Meen Bheria

9. Laskula

10. Lutera Sher

11. Wolfa

12. Grahno

13. Tilange

14. Bali

15. Nahi Rahega Aatank

16. Baagad Billi

17. Bhatiki Ka Jaal

18. Bheria ka Kanoon

19. Hatyara

20. Ladake

21. Achook

22. Nagor

23. Maut Ke Parkale

24. Kaigula

25. Gajara

26. Maut Mere Andar

27. Indrajaal

28. Mogambo

29. Andhi Dhund

30. Totampol

31. Ayi Musibat

32. Jinda Pathar

33. Kala Sona

34. Jaag Kritya Jaag

35. Janwar

36. Bhujang

37. Neeli Lashein

38. Kobi aur Bheria

39. Mera Jungle

40. Aag aur Paani

41. Jen

42. Chaaro Khane Chit

43. Doma

44. Balikuthar

45. Bheel

46. Masaba

47. Bachna Mushkil

48. Budha Jungle

49. Bhaago Pagal Aaya

50. Kshetra

51. Thoo Thoo

52. Maaramari

53. Hurdang

54. Bura Na Mano

55. Apni Raksha Aap

56. Kadam Kadam Par

57. Pathar Kobi Pathar Bheria

58. Kaantein

59. Yuvraj

60. Bheria Vansh

61. Marr gya Bheria

62. Kobi Bajaye Baja

63. Jungle Jungle Maut Chali

64. Apshakun

65. Maut Na Maar Koi

66. Jal Utha Jungle

67. King Luna

68. Ajooba

69. Jeetega Thodanga

70. Dekh Tabahi Lakdi Ki

71. Wohi Puarana Jallad

72. Maut Kshetra

73. Chhupa Kabra

74. Sardar Kobi

75. Ashwa

76. Condor

77. Maut Jaegi Khali Haath

78. Jungle Paar

79. Kala Bheria

80. Kaise Ladu Kaise Bhidu

81. Uttradhikari

82. Jungle Meri Muthi Mein

83. Kale Log Musibat Bhog

84. Mai Bhi Rakshak

85. Jungle Ka Beta

86. Tarzoo

87. Jungle Sharir

88. Jungle Sabka Hai

89. Jungle Khali Karo

90. Asli Nakli

91. Yahi Hai Kobi

92. Aadamkhor Bheria

93. Gajbola

94. Ek Gin Ek Bheria

95. Chero Pao Maut

96. Jaan Par Bhari

97. Ichcha Aur Dhari

98. Pinjer

99. Prem Bala

100. Prem Na Khoon

101. Prem Hiran

102. Avdhoot

103. Prem Pishach

104. Prem Tadap

105. Prem Prateek

106. Prem Ratan

107. Prem Ashru

108. Prem Shradh

109. Van Rakshak

110. Shaapit Rakshak

111. Aahuti

112. Bheria Kaun

113. Bheria Ki Khoj

114. Jaan Ke Laale

115. Kobi Bhai

116. Ek Myaan Do Talwaarein

- By Bizarre Hands

1. Issue #1

2. Issue #2: Not from Detroit

3. Issue #3: The Pit

4. Issue #4: Tight Little Stitches In A Dead Man's Back

5. Issue #5: Night They Missed The Horror Show

6. Issue #6: God of The Razor/My Dead Dog, Bobby

C:

- Caliber Rounds
- Conan The Slayer

1. Issue #12: The Devil in Iron Part Six

D:

- Deadly Inferno: Battle of The Wilderness

E:

- Escape of The Living Dead
- Escape of The Living Dead: Airborne
- Escape of The Living Dead: Fearbook
- Escape of The Living Dead: Trade Paperback Collected Edition
- Escape of The Living Dead: Resurrected

G:

- G.I. Joe

1. Issue #1: The Fall of G.I. Joe Part One

2. Issue #2: The Fall of G.I. Joe Part Two

3. Issue #3: The Fall of G.I. Joe Part Three

4. Issue #4: The Fall of G.I. Joe Part Four

5. Issue #5: The Fall of G.I. Joe Part Five

6. Issue #6: The Fall of G.I. Joe Part Six

7. Issue #7: The Fall of G.I. Joe Part Seven

8. Issue #8: The Fall of G.I. Joe Conclusion

- Grimm Fairy Tales presents Alice In Wonderland One-Shot

I:

- Iron Man 2.0

1. Issue #1: Palmer Addley Is Dead Part One

2. Issue #2: Palmer Addley Is Dead Part Two

3. Issue #3: Palmer Addley Is Dead Part Three

4. Issue #4: Palmer Addley Is Dead Part Four

5. Issue #5: Fear Itself Part One

6. Issue #6: Fear Itself Part Two

7. Issue #7: Fear Itself

8. Issue #7.1

9. Issue #8: The Palmer Addley Infection

10. Issue #9: The Palmer Addley Infection, Part Two

11. Issue #10: The Palmer Addley Infection, Part Three

12. Issue #11: The Palmer Addley Infection, Part Four

13. Issue #12: The Palmer Addley Infection, Conclusion

K:

- Kade: Sun of Perdition

L:

- Lady Death

1. Lady Death: Unholy Ruin

2. Lady Death: Apocalyptic Abyss

3. Lady Death: Hellraiders

4. Lady Death: Hot Shots

5. Lady Death: Chaos Rules

6. Lady Death: Damnation Game

7. Lady Death: Extinction Express

8. Lady Death: Oblivion Kiss

9. Lady Death: Merciless Onslaught

- Lynx

1. Issue #1: Call Me G-d!

2. Issue #2: Lynx Origin

3. Issue #3: Phone Home

4. Issue #4: Who is Yahweh?

N:

- Night of The Living Dead: The Beginning
- Night of The Living Dead: Just a Girl
- Night of The Living Dead: Hunger
- Night of The Living Dead: New York
- Night of The Living Dead: TPB
- Night of The Living Dead: Death Valley
- Night of The Living Dead: Aftermath

P:

- Plague of The Living Dead
- Plague of The Living Dead Special
- Project 26

S:

- Snow White One-Shot

T:

- The Complete Dracula
- The Transformers Series - Fall of Cybertron Issues

1. Issue #1: Good Intentions

2. Issue #2: Secrets

3. Issue #3: Siege Mentality

4. Issue #4: Last Stand

5. Issue #5: Fragmentation

6. Issue #6: Fall

- The Transformers: Robots In Disguise

1. Issue #1: The Autonomy Lesson

2. Issue #2: The World And Everything In It

3. Issue #3: Stick Together

4. Issue #4: Devisive

5. Issue #5: A Better Tomorrow

6. Issue #6: Syndromica (1)

7. Issue #7: Inference Patterns

8. Issue #8: Dinobot Hunt

9. Issue #9: Night And The City

10. Issue #10: Syndromica

11. Issue #11: The End Of The Beginning Of The World

12. Issue #12: City On Fire

13. Issue #13: The Verge

14. Issue #14: Before The Dawn

15. Issue #15: Plan For Everything

16. Issue #16: Heavy Is The Head

17. Issue #17: Dark Cybertron Prelude - Shockwaves

18. Issue #18: Dark Cybertron Prelude - Second Exodus

19. Issue #19: Dark Cybertron Prelude - Homecoming

20. Issue #20: Dark Cybertron Prelude - Three Monologues - 1. Long Night, 2. Young Evening, 3. Early Dawn

21. Issue #21: Dark Cybertron Prelude - Shockpoint

22. Issue #22: Dark Cybertron Prelude - Soundwaves

23. Issue #23: "Winners & Losers" - Dark Cybertron Chapter 3

24. Issue #24: Finest Hour - Dark Cybertron Chapter 5

25. Issue #25: The Dead Are Not Enough - Dark Cybertron Chapter 7

26. Issue #26: Finis Temporis - Dark Cybertron Chapter 9

27. Issue #27: Black Planet - Dark Cybertron Chapter 11

28. Issue #28: EarthFall Part 1 - Hello Cruel World

29. Issue #29: EarthFall Part 2 - Detonation Boulevard

30. Issue #30: EarthFall Part 3 - The Mind Bomb

31. Issue #31: EarthFall Part 4 - Full Fathom Five

32. Issue #32: EarthFall Part 5 - I Dream of Wires

33. Issue #33: The World Of Tomorrow

34. Issue #34: The Crucible

- The X-Files/Transformers: Conspiracy

Y:

- Yuggoth Creatures
- Alan Moore's Yuggoth Creatures And Other Growths

Z:

- Zombie Dawn: Safe House
