= Anatoly Fradis =

American film producer

- Born: September 26, 1948; Odesa, Ukrainian SSR, USSR

Anatoly Fradis (born September 26, 1948) is an actor, film director, producer and entrepreneur.

== Early life ==
Fradis was born into a film family as a third-generation filmmaker. His grandfather, Akiva Fradis, was one of the original founders of the Film Studio in the City of Odesa, on the Black Sea, in 1919. Then, his father, Adolf Fradis, worked at the same studio since 1933, as UPM and executive producer of the Russian films Mysterious Island, Tanker Derbent and The Shooting Party. After fighting in World War II, Adolf Fradis came back in 1945 to work for the same studio and produced more than 66 films for Odesa Film Studios and, later, Mosfilm Studios. Anatoly's mother was a film editor, and his sister, Tatiana, was a sound designer for Russian Television.

== Early career in Russia ==
In his early childhood, during the 1950s, Anatoly Fradis was a child actor, starring in the Russian film White Poodle. He also acted in the Odesa Russian Theatre. In 1966, his entire family moved to Moscow, where Fradis graduated in 1970 from the Schepkin Drama School and later from the High Courses of Scriptwriters and Film Directors. Anatoly Fradis worked as a film director for Mosfilm Studios, Moscow, from the time he was twenty until he departed for the United States in 1979. During his Mosfilm's years, Mr. Fradis worked as First AD and Director on Front Behind the Front Lines and Live on Their Own.

== In the United States ==
Upon his arrival to the United States in 1979, Fradis began his career as a promoter and impresario. He promoted primarily Eastern European films and live shows from the former USSR, Poland, Hungary, Bulgaria and Yugoslavia and toured them throughout the US, Canada and Western Europe. He was involved in bringing Karel Gott, Lili Ivanova, the Romen Theatre (Moscow Gypsy Theatre), Jewish Theatre, Warsaw, and Sarita Montiel, with Spanish Ballet Fuego Flamenco into the US, as well as José Feliciano and Johnny Cash to Eastern Europe.

His company, AFRA Film Enterprises, formed in 1980 to promote mainly Russian and Eastern European films. Under exclusive contractual arrangement with Film Polski, AFRA obtained Polish art films, many of which were shelved during martial law. Since 1987, Fradis and his company has represented Mosfilm Studios, Russia, in the US and Canada, serving as a liaison between Mosfilm and several production companies in America and Europe, arranging co-productions and service deals including Back in the USSR for 20th Century Fox/Largo Entertainment and The Inner Circle for Columbia Pictures. Fradis was instrumental in bringing American motion pictures for private distribution in the USSR, including Rambo – First Blood, Gone with the Wind, Wanted Dead or Alive, Stella, and Elvira, Mistress of the Dark. Since 1990, Fradis became one of the major suppliers of American films to the USSR, selling to Russia as many as 60 films per year. For more than fifteen years AFRA-FILM and MOSFILM/USA were arranging and coordinating Mosfilm's efforts in Cannes, Milan and Los Angeles during respective film festivals and markets.

One of Fradis' other business ventures, International Business Consortium Corporation, represented the Samsung Group and its electronic products for the territory of Poland between 1985 and 1995.

Fradis produced two films during 1992 to 1993 in partnership with Roger Corman's Concord-New Horizons, Haunted Symphony and Burial of the Rats, as well as, in 1994, an action-thriller Beyond Forgiveness for Showtime/Nu Image. In 1996, Fradis produced two films, Marquis De Sade for Showtime and Termination Man for Saban Entertainment. From 1996 to 1997, Fradis financed and produced the film Business for Pleasure in partnership with Zalman King Productions for Showtime, where he worked in Austria. Since then, he was able to arrange co-financing for several American films to be shot in Austria and Germany. In 1998, Fradis produced several episodes of the TV series Red Shoe Diaries for Showtime, and Black Sea-213 for HBO/Playboy International.

In 1999, Fradis and his partners from Northern California established a new company, Theatre Promotions Management Corporation, which was involved in the renovation project of the October cinema in Moscow, supplying the 11-screen multiplex with film projection, sound and concert equipment. Also, Fradis was involved in the construction of a 14-screen multiplex in downtown Seoul, South Korea and several multiplexes in Warsaw, Poland.

In 2002, Fradis, together with Joseph Cohen, established new financing and production entity, which financed and executive produced Bob Dylan's Masked and Anonymous. In 2005 to 2006, Fradis financed and produced Return of the Living Dead: Necropolis and Return of the Living Dead: Rave to the Grave. In 2009–2010, Fradis co-produced the American version (in English) of a Russian motion picture, Anna Karenina.

In November 2014, Fradis brought the Jewish Theater from Warsaw, Poland to tour their show Masel Tov in Los Angeles, San Francisco, New York and Philadelphia. In 2015, Fradis organized the 1st Hollywood Festival of the best Ukrainian Films, which took place at the Laemmle Fine Arts Theater in Los Angeles.

Fradis and Vulich, under their company, Aurora CineStreem Corporation, developed an Internet IPTV streaming device, Aurora Professional STB, which the company is implementing in Russia, Poland, Italy, France and South-East Asia.

Recently, Fradis completed co-producing a Russian-American basketball picture, Going Vertical, directed by Anton Megerdichev.
