= Return of the Living Dead: Rave to the Grave =

2005 film by Ellory Elkayem

- Promotional poster
- Written by: William Butler; Aaron Strongoni
- Directed by: Ellory Elkayem
- Starring: Aimee-Lynn Chadwick; Cory Hardrict; John Keefe; Jenny Mollen; Peter Coyote
- Music by: Robert Duncan; Ralph Rieckermann
- Country of origin: United States
- Original language: English

Production
- Producers: Anatoly Fradis; Steve Scarduzio
- Cinematography: Thomas L. Callaway
- Editor: James Coblentz
- Running time: 94 minutes
- Production companies: Denholm Trading Inc.; Aurora Entertainment; Castel Film Romania

Original release
- Network: Sci-Fi Channel
- Release: October 15, 2005

Related
- Return of the Living Dead: Necropolis

Return of the Living Dead: Rave to the Grave (also known as Return of the Living Dead 5: Rave from the Grave) is a 2005 made-for-television action horror film directed by Ellory Elkayem and starring Aimee-Lynn Chadwick, Cory Hardrict, John Keefe, Jenny Mollen, and Peter Coyote.

The film was produced with Return of the Living Dead: Necropolis and is the fifth installment of the Return of the Living Dead film series.

== Plot ==
The film opens with Charles Garrison arriving at a mortuary with a canister of Trioxin. He is greeted by a team of Interpol agents who aim to destroy the last canisters to avoid another incident. Nevertheless, one of them sprays three corpses with the gas and revives them. Charles is killed during the incident, along with the mortuary owner and one of the government officials.

It's Halloween, and Jenny, with Julian, Cody, and Becky, the last three survivors of the previous film, are now in college, and they receive notice of the "murder" of Charles. Julian and Jenny search for and possibly sell what belonged to Charles, and they find the last two barrels of Trioxin. One is taken to Cody, who tests the chemical inside it. Jeremy, Jenny's brother, tastes the chemical when he thinks that it is a drug similar to ecstasy, but he goes into a spasm, in which he foams at the mouth, and later describes what it was like. The chemical is named "Z" for its zombie-like effect on the living.

Cody, Jeremy, and Shelby extract the chemical from the canister and put the liquid extract into pills, which they sell to Skeet so he can sell the drug around the school. While Skeet informs everyone to only take one pill at a time for health reasons, most take more, which speeds up the process that causes humans to reanimate as zombies.

Gino and Aldo Serra, the only survivors from the beginning of the movie, recognize what is going on when they are shown the severed head of one of the zombies. They go to question Julian, knowing he is familiar with Trioxin, but he does not tell them anything about the canisters he and Jenny discovered. Sometime later, people are turning into zombies, and the drug is being passed around a rave and getting out of control. Cody and Shelby are killed. Jenny kills Zombie Jeremy. Seeing no other option, Aldo calls in military assistance, but he is told that an American bomber plane is already on the way to the rave location. The plane launches a bomb, which detonates in the center of the rave. Jenny and Julian emerge from the rubble alive, and Aldo asks where Gino is and tries to find him. It is unclear if Gino died during the blast. At the film's end, the Tarman desperately tries to hitchhike a ride to the party, but to no avail. After scaring away a woman who almost gave him a ride, he has no choice but to walk to the party, yelling his trademark "Brains!" as he goes.

== Cast ==
- Aimee-Lynn Chadwick as Becky Carlton
- Cory Hardrict as Cody
- John Keefe as Julian Garrison
- Jenny Mollen as Jenny
- Peter Coyote as Uncle Charles
- Claudiu Bleonț as Aldo Serra
- Sorin Cocis as Gino Corelli
- Cain Mihnea Manoliu as Jeremy
- George Dumitrescu as Artie
- Maria Dinulescu as Shelby
- Catalin Paraschiv as "Skeet"
- Radu Romaniuc as Brett
- Sebastian Marina as Dartagnan
- Violeta Aldea as "Rainbow"
- Ricky Dandel as Coach Savini
- Allan Trautman as Tarman Zombie
- Sandu Mihai Gruia as Mortician
- Aureliu Surulescu as Guitarist
- Dan Bordeianu as Tyler
- Eduard Opaski as Fat Gouged Eye Zombie
- Diana Vladu as Roommate
- Maria Roman as Serenity
- Vlad Coada as Janitor
- Elena Ghenoiu as Cheerleader
- Ionut Grama as John
- Dave Snyder as Stoner #2
- Mike Measimer as Stoner #1
- Andreea Paduraru as Shelby
- Ovidiu Niculescu as Interpol Agent (uncredited)

== Production ==
The film was shot immediately after Return of the Living Dead: Necropolis using locations and actors in Romania and Ukraine. Multiple scenes were filmed in the suburbs of Bucharest. Peter Coyote, Aimee-Lynn Chadwick, Cory Hardrict, and John Keefe returned from the previous installment.

== Release and reception ==
An edited version of the film aired along with Return of the Living Dead: Necropolis on the Sci-Fi Channel on October 15, 2005. The R-rated version of the film was released on DVD on March 20, 2007 by Lionsgate Home Entertainment.

The film has received generally negative reception. Film critic Felix Vasquez, Jr. gave the film a negative review, though writing that "this kind of bad film gives you perfect opportunity to improvise mocking".

== See also ==
- List of films set around Halloween
