= Eight Legged Freaks =

2002 film by Ellory Elkayem

- Theatrical release poster
- Directed by: Ellory Elkayem
- Screenplay by: Jesse Alexander; Ellory Elkayem
- Story by: Ellory Elkayem; Randy Kornfield
- Produced by: Dean Devlin; Bruce Berman
- Starring: David Arquette; Kari Wuhrer; Scott Terra; Doug E. Doug; Scarlett Johansson
- Cinematography: John S. Bartley
- Edited by: David Siegel
- Music by: John Ottman
- Production companies: Village Roadshow Pictures; NPV Entertainment; Electric Entertainment
- Distributed by: Warner Bros. Pictures (Worldwide); Roadshow Film Distributors (Australia and New Zealand)
- Release dates: July 19, 2002 (United States); August 15, 2002 (Germany); September 26, 2002 (Australia)
- Running time: 99 minutes
- Countries: United States; Germany; Australia
- Language: English
- Budget: $30 million
- Box office: $45.9 million

Eight Legged Freaks (originally titled Arac Attack, under which it was released in some parts of Europe and other countries around the world) is a 2002 monster comedy horror film directed by Ellory Elkayem and starring David Arquette, Kari Wuhrer, Scott Terra, Doug E. Doug, and Scarlett Johansson. The plot follows spiders that are exposed to mutagenic toxic waste, causing them to grow to colossal sizes and attack a small American mining town.

== Plot ==
On a highway outside the quiet mining town of Prosperity, Arizona, a truck driver swerves to avoid a rabbit, causing a barrel of toxic waste to land in a pond. Crickets that feed from the pond are collected by an exotic spider farmer, Joshua Taft. One week later, Joshua shows Mike Parker, a local boy, his collection, including an enormous female orb-weaver spider from Brazil named Consuela. After Mike leaves, Joshua is bitten by an escaped tarantula, accidentally knocks down the spider cages, and is killed by the spiders. After devouring him, the spiders grow too large to contain, with enormous proportions due to the toxins in the crickets Joshua fed them.

Another week later, Chris McCormick, whose father owned the mines before he died ten years ago, returns to Prosperity and stands against Wade, the mayor of Prosperity, about his proposition to sell the mine, as he believes that his father had discovered a gold vein in the mine. Chris also sparks a romance with Sam Parker, the town sheriff and Mike's mother, whose ex-husband Chris assaulted for being unfaithful to her, resulting in Chris's exile.

Wade holds a meeting in the town's new mall about whether they should sell the mines and relocate, claiming Chris's father was delusional for thinking gold was in the mine. A grounded Mike sneaks out of his home and finds Joshua's farm covered in webbing. He sees an enormous spider shadow in the mines and tells Chris that the spiders have grown to enormous sizes, based on a giant spider leg he found at the mine entrance. Chris does not believe him, nor does Sam, who extends his grounding.

As the entire town is connected in some way to the mines, spiders show up in various places, abducting pets and animals, including Deputy Pete's cat and Wade's ostriches. Harlan Griffiths, an eccentric extraterrestrial enthusiast, is broadcasting his theory that they have been abducted by aliens. Ashley, Mike's older sister, breaks up with her boyfriend and Wade's troublemaking stepson Bret when he tries to seduce her aggressively. Bret and his motorcyclist friends are then chased by jumping spiders. Bret, the only survivor, accidentally cuts off the telephone line and ends up stuck in the mine. While traversing the mines, he finds Consuela feeding on victims trapped in spider webbing.

Chris discovers that his aunt Gladys was abducted by spiders in their basement and finds a massive spider leg, which he shows to Mike. Sam is convinced Chris and Mike are delusional until a giant male orb weaver attacks Ashley and Chris. Sam kills the spider with a shotgun and tells Pete to bring all guns from the police station to her place. Ashley, Chris, Sam, Mike and Pete escape to Harlan's trailer to use his radio station. Sam broadcasts the threat over the radio until a giant tarantula assaults the trailer, but they escape. As the town is besieged by the vicious spiders, Sam tells everybody to evacuate to the mall. Harlan and Chris climb onto the mall's roof, ascend the radio mast, and call the army, but are believed to be pranksters. The tarantula breaks open the gates, letting the spiders enter the mall. While the townsfolk hole up in the mall's basement, Wade flees through a gate into the mine, leaving the others to fend for themselves, only to be grabbed by the spiders. To help Chris escape, Harlan jumps from the roof and rejoins Pete, who was left behind during the evacuation.

In the basement, Bret arrives on a forklift that brings down the gate to the mines, and reconciles with Ashley. While the townsfolk head through the mines to the entrance, they discover tunnels filled with methane gas. After coming upon Consuela's lair and freeing Wade, as well as learning from Sam that his father told her about the reason for Chris's exile, Chris looks for Gladys. He finds her and the gold vein his father discovered, but they are confronted by Consuela. Chris uses perfume to distract Consuela, and escaping on Bret's motorcycle, he ignites the methane using Gladys's cigarette matches, blowing up Consuela, her spider army, and the mall, leaving Wade distraught, before Pete and Harlan arrive with the police, who have answered the distress call.

Chris reopens the mine, and Harlan delivers a radio report that the town has decided to cover up the whole incident, but let Harlan continue broadcasting about it. As Harlan concludes his broadcast, he gives off a smile, revealing several golden teeth telling his viewers that the town also had reopened the gold mine.

== Cast ==
- David Arquette as Christopher "Chris" McCormick, the proprietor of a mine.
- Kari Wuhrer as Samantha "Sam" Parker, the sheriff of Prosperity.
- Scott Terra as Michael "Mike" Parker, the son of Samantha Parker.
- Doug E. Doug as Harlan Griffith, an extraterrestrial enthusiast who owns his own radio station.
- Scarlett Johansson as Ashley Parker, the daughter of Samantha Parker.
- Rick Overton as Peterson "Pete" Willis, Sam's deputy.
- Leon Rippy as Wade, the Mayor of Prosperity and Bret's stepfather.
- Matt Czuchry as Bret, Ashley’s boyfriend and Wade’s stepson.
- Jay Arlen Jones as Leon, a miner working in Chris's mine.
- Eileen Ryan as Gladys, the aunt of Chris.
- Riley Smith as Randy
- Matt Holwick as Larry
- Jane Edith Wilson as Emma Willis, Pete's ex-wife.
- Jack Moore as Amos
- Roy Gaintner as Floyd, a barber.
- Don Champlin as Leroy, a barber and Floyd's partner.
- John Christopher Storey as Mark, a civilian of Prosperity.
- David Earl Waterman as Norman, a maintenance worker at Prosperity Mall.
- Spider vocals by Rob Paulsen, Kevin Michael Richardson and Frank Welker

== Production ==
Director Ellory Elkayem got the idea from his 1997 short film, Larger Than Life, which also handled a spider-fighting storyline.

The film was originally titled Arach Attack, but the similarity to "Iraq Attack" made the title seem inappropriate after September 11 attacks. The title Eight Legged Freaks is a line that Arquette ad-libbed in the movie: "Get back, you eight-legged freaks!". The film was released as Arach Attack or Arac Attack in some parts of Europe and other countries around the world. The visual effects are provided by CFX.

The film was dedicated to the memory of several people: Lewis Arquette, father of David Arquette, who died in 2001 from heart failure, and Don Devlin and Pilar Seurat, the parents of producer Dean Devlin, who died of lung cancer in 2000 and 2001 respectively.

=== Filming locations ===
Prosperity is a fictional town in Arizona, though the film was actually shot in various locations in the state.

- The scenes inside Prosperity Mall were actually shot at Manistee Town Center, a closed mall in Glendale, Arizona. The mall was demolished a year after the shooting was completed and redeveloped; its demolition was featured in the film as a consequence of the tunnel's methane gas explosion.
- The scenes in Aunt Gladys's house in the kitchen and Gladys's basement were filmed at the Manistee Ranch in Glendale, directly adjacent to the mall itself.
- Some of the town scenes were shot in the old copper mining town of Superior, Arizona.
- The gas station scene was shot in Black Canyon City, Arizona.

=== Spiders used in the film ===
The following spiders were used in the film:

- Jumping spider
- Orb-weaver spider (Consuela & male Orb-weavers)
- Tarantula
- Trapdoor spider
- Spitting spider
- Tiger Wolf spider

=== Alternate credits ===
==== Alternate beginning ====
The alternate beginning is an extended version in which Harlan does a broadcast promoting the mall after which Norman sees Wade approaching the driver of the toxic waste barrels before having the barrels put in the basement, directly in the mines.

==== Alternate ending ====
In the alternate ending after the mines are blown up, the townsfolk walk down a road to get help. They meet up with Pete and Harlan who were walking through the desert. Pete tries to convince Harlan the spiders were not aliens. Afterward, Sam and Chris kiss as the scene ends.

== Release ==
The teaser trailer debuted in October 2001 attached to Thirteen Ghosts and Queen of the Damned. The film was originally going to be released on March 15, but the date was moved because of the competition of Fox's family-friendly film Ice Age.

== Reception ==
On Rotten Tomatoes the film has an approval rating of 48% based on reviews from 145 critics, with an average rating of 5.44/10. The site's consensus states: "This homage to the B-movies of the '50s has a promising first half, but runs out of ideas in the second". On Metacritic the film has a score of 53% based on reviews from 32 critics, indicating "mixed or average" reviews. Audiences polled by CinemaScore gave the film a grade "B−" on scale of A to F.

Roger Ebert of the Chicago Sun-Times gave it 3 out of 4 and wrote: "Has laughs, thrills, wit, and scary monsters, and is one of those goofy movies like Critters that kids itself and gets away with it."

== Video game ==
A video game adaptation titled Eight Legged Freaks: Let the Squashing Begin was released in 2002 for PC and Mac.

== Cancelled sequel ==
On January 5, 2003, the movie news website Moviehole reported that Eight Legged Freaks 2 was in development, but no additional information has come forth since then.

== Home media ==
Eight Legged Freaks was released on VHS and on DVD in both widescreen and fullscreen edition formats on October 29, 2002. Shout! Factory released the film on Blu-ray for the first time on July 20, 2021.
