= Escape of the Living Dead =

- Cover to Escape of the Living Dead: Airborne #1.

Publication information
- Publisher: Avatar Press
- Schedule: Monthly
- Format: Limited series
- Genre
- Publication date: September 2005 – March 2006
- No. of issues: 5

Creative team
- Written by: John A. Russo
- Artist: Dheeraj Verma
- Inker: Lalit Kumar Singh

Collected editions
- Escape of the Living Dead: ISBN 1-59291-034-3
- Escape of the Living Dead: Resurrected: ISBN 1592910475

Escape of the Living Dead is a five-issue zombie comic book miniseries published by Avatar Press, published in 2005. It is written by John A. Russo with artwork by Dheeraj Verma.

The story is an alternate sequel to Night of the Living Dead and is not set in the continuity of George A. Romero’s series of films or The Return of the Living Dead film series.

It was followed in 2006 by Escape of the Living Dead Fearbook and Escape of the Living Dead: Airborne, a three-issue miniseries, and Escape of the Living Dead Annual, published in 2007.

== Plot ==
Set in 1971, 3 years after the events seen in Night of the Living Dead, the comic starts out with a raid by police officers led by Sheriff Harkness on a medical lab run by Dr. Melrose. During the raid the officers manage to shoot Dr. Melrose. Before he dies he reveals he had been experimenting on the zombies for a government funded project and tells the officers about his son who is taking over the project.

Meanwhile, one of the main characters, Sally Brinkman, is talking to her father Henry. It is revealed Sally is staying with her parents whilst going through a divorce and is working for her father at the local saloon.

Also, two robbers for the gang Sons of Satan attempt to rob a truck by pouring sugar in the gas tank, and then robbing its contents. When they look in the truck, they find it is full of zombies that proceed to attack and eat them. With the zombies released they start walking towards the town.

The zombies eventually reach the Brinkman farm and kill Sally’s mother. The zombies then try to attack Sally, but she manages to avoid them and ride a horse to the saloon where her Dad works. However, zombies have also attacked the saloon as well; Henry attempts to fight the zombies off but hides in the saloon just as Sally appears. They both hide in the saloon and lock the doors.

Meanwhile, the rest of the Sons of Satan gang attempt to meet up with the robbers from before, only to encounter them now as zombies. The three gang members, Bearcat, Slam, and Honeybear, kill the zombies before driving off. They eventually reach the saloon, where they are surrounded by zombies. Sally and Henry notice this and let them in.

Eventually, the zombies start to break in, and the bikers attempt to escape, kidnapping Sally and stealing a truck in the process, leaving Henry to be eaten. During this, one of the bikers, Honeybear, is killed, while Henry manages to avoid the zombies and get a truck to chase after the bikers.

Meanwhile, the two bikers and Sally have taken refuge in the nearby woods. Sally is now tied up when zombies attack the trio. Although they fight off the zombies, Slam is bitten and, in panic, kills Bearcat. He then forces Sally to take him to her house to help him.

At this time, Sheriff Harkness discovers the truck that the zombies were originally transported in; he concludes this was the operation that Dr. Melrose mentioned. At this point Henry shows up, and helps Sheriff Harkness decide to get a posse together to kill the zombies.

Back at Sally’s farm, Sally is forced to help Slam clean his wounds; she unsuccessfully tries to kill him with his knife and flees, but Slam chases after her as she runs into the basement. Slam then tries to kill her, but is killed by a hidden zombie. Sally runs outside to find her father and a posse killing the zombies.

The posse then fight a horde of zombies, which attack them. Although outnumbered, the military show up and kill all the zombies. After the fight Sheriff Harkness gets a call on the radio, saying that the Dr. Melrose that they killed at the beginning did not match the dental records, and thus was an impostor.

The last pages shows a lone zombie being captured by the real Dr. Melrose and his son, implying the zombie epidemic is far from over.

== Cover art ==
Escape of the Living Dead #1 was published with 13 different cover art versions. Dheeraj Verma created seven - "Regular", American Badass, "Blood Red Con Foil", "Gold Foil", "Gore", "Red Foil Russo Signed" and "Wraparound" versions; Mike Wolfer created four - "Die Cut", "Leather", "Nightmare" and "Terror"; Jason Burrows and Jeremy Rock both created one - "Burrows" and "They Live" respectively.

Escape of the Living Dead #2 was published with 9 different cover art versions. Dheeraj Verma created six - "Regular", "Ghostly", "Gold Foil", "Gore", "Topless" and "Wraparound"; Mike Wolfer created three - "Defrocked", "Die Cut" and "Terror".

Escape of the Living Dead #3 was published with 7 different cover art versions. Dheeraj Verma created five - "Regular", "Captive", "Gore", "Trapped", "Wraparound"; Mike Wolfer created two - "Die Cut" and "Terror".

Escape of the Living Dead #4 was published with 7 different cover art versions. Dheeraj Verma created five - "Regular", "Gore", "Terror" and "Wraparound"; Mike Wolfer and Jeremy Rock both created one - "Die Cut" and "Feast" respectively.

Escape of the Living Dead #5 was published with 8 different cover art versions. Dheeraj Verma created five - "Regular", "Gore", "Terror", "Wraparound"; Mike Wolfer, Jason Burrows and Jeremy Rock all created one - "Die Cut", "Burrows" and "Hungry for Flesh" respectively.

== Collected editions ==
The series has been collected into two trade paperbacks:

- Escape of the Living Dead (120 pages, August 2006, ISBN 1-59291-034-3)
- Escape of the Living Dead: Resurrected (240 pages, January 2006, ISBN 1-59291-047-5)

== Film adaptation ==
A film adaptation - to be directed by John Russo and starring Tony Todd, Kane Hodder, Amber Stevens, Kristina Klebe and Gunnar Hansen - was announced in 2008. However, this version never came to fruition. As of 2015, Russo is still actively trying to develop the film project.

== See also ==
- List of zombie novels
