= Return of the Living Dead 3 =

1993 film

- Theatrical release poster
- Directed by: Brian Yuzna
- Written by: John Penney
- Produced by: Lawrence Steven Meyers; Brian Yuzna; Gary Schmoeller; John Penney
- Starring: Melinda Clarke; J. Trevor Edmond; Kent McCord; Basil Wallace
- Cinematography: Gerry Lively
- Edited by: Christopher Roth
- Music by: Barry Goldberg
- Production companies: Ozla Productions; Trimark Pictures
- Distributed by: Universal Pictures
- Release date: October 29, 1993
- Running time: 97 minutes
- Countries: United States; Japan
- Language: English
- Budget: $2 million
- Box office: $54,207 (US)

Return of the Living Dead 3 is a 1993 romantic horror film directed by Brian Yuzna and written by John Penney. It is the third film in the Return of the Living Dead film series, following Return of the Living Dead Part II (1988). It received a limited release before going to video; it was the last of the series to receive a theatrical release.

== Plot ==
Five years after the events of the previous film, Curt Reynolds steals his father's security key card, and he and his girlfriend, Julie Walker, explore the military base where his father works. They observe Curt's father, Colonel John Reynolds, Col. Peck and Lt. Col. Sinclair overseeing an experiment with a deceased body.

The corpse is exposed to 2-4-5 Trioxin gas, which re-animates the corpse into a zombie. The military hopes to use zombies in combat. However, they are impossible to control as their hunger for human brains causes them to constantly attack.

To deter the zombies' vicious nature, Sinclair suggests permanently attaching the zombies to exoskeletons that will immobilize them when they are not in battle. Reynolds prefers a method referred to as "paretic infusion", which involves firing a chemical projectile into the forehead of the zombie. This causes an endothermic reaction, freezing the zombie's brain and temporarily immobilizing it.

When the paretic infusion method is tested on the zombie in the lab, it is only successful for a few moments, wearing off much faster than expected; the zombie breaks free and attacks a scientist, biting his fingers off before bashing his head against a wall, killing him. Infected by the zombie's bite, the scientist re-animates and attacks another technician. The initial zombie and the reanimated scientist are paralyzed with bullets and the survivors in the room are quarantined. Reynolds is removed from the project and reassigned to Oklahoma City, while Sinclair is promoted to head of the project.

Reynolds informs Curt that they will be moving, something they have done multiple times, but Curt refuses. He rides off on his motorcycle with Julie. While they are speeding down the road, Julie playfully grabs Curt's crotch, causing him to lose control of the motorcycle and crash. Julie is thrown from the bike into a telephone pole; the impact kills her.

Curt brings Julie's corpse to the military base. Using his father's key card, he accesses the Trioxin gas to reanimate her. After she is revived, the two escape on Curt's bike. Julie experiences intense hunger so Curt drives to a store. Inside, Curt runs afoul of a gang, leading to a struggle that results in the shopkeeper being shot by a member of the gang. As they run from the store Julie bites the shooter’s arm. Curt and Julie flee from authorities in a van with the wounded shopkeeper. However, after the shopkeeper is accidentally shot in the head by pursuing officers, Julie's hunger for brains overcomes her and she feasts on his corpse, eating some of his brains.

As the shooter's health declines due to Julie's bite, the gang attempts to track down her and Curt. Julie and Curt hide from the gang in the sewers, where they encounter Riverman, a vagrant who shelters them. Julie discovers that extreme pain seems to temporarily make the cravings to feed on humans go away. She mutilates her flesh with various items of junk found around Riverman's lair, until she is adorned with spikes, nails, and shards of glass sticking out of her flesh.

The gang tracks Julie and Curt down, wounding Riverman in the process. Julie seduces the gang leader, then kills him and uses her new decorations to kill another gang member. A third gang member is saved from Julie by Curt, but then is attacked and killed by the reanimated shooter. Julie and Curt flee, but Julie's body becomes accustomed to the pain, and she turns on Riverman off-screen, infecting and killing him. The rest of the gang re-animates before the military arrives and neutralizes all of the zombies.

When the zombies are captured, Curt realizes Julie is going to be used as a weapon and goes into a rage. He rescues her and inadvertently frees several other zombies, which then kill two scientists. In the commotion the base is set on fire and Curt is bitten. Curt's father tries to get Curt to leave with the rest of the military personnel but he realizes that he would be abandoning Julie, and also knows he is infected. Curt brings Julie to the furnace; when she asks where they are, Curt says "where we belong", and they kiss one last time before dying by immolation.

== Cast ==
- Kent McCord as Colonel John Reynolds
- Melinda Clarke as Julie Walker
- J. Trevor Edmond as Curt Reynolds
- James T. Callahan as Colonel Peck
- Sarah Douglas as Lieutenant Colonel Sinclair
- Abigail Lenz as Mindy
- Basil Wallace as "Riverman"
- Jill Andre as Dr. Beers
- Billy Kane as Waters
- Mike Moroff as Santos Morales
- Fabio Urena as Mogo Entvaz
- Pia Reyes as Alicia Kitsing
- Sal Lopez as Felipe Hernandez
- Dana Lee as Ping, The Store Owner
- Anthony Hickox as Dr. Hickox

== Themes and style ==
Retrospective assessments of Return of the Living Dead 3 published by Den of Geek and Scream characterize it as differing tonally from the first film in the series, which was released in 1985. Den of Geek's Nick Aldwinckle wrote that Return of the Living Dead 3 "adopts more of an angsty nineties tone", noting that the effects of the Trioxin on Julie lead her to engage in self-harm and body piercing in order to suppress her hunger for brains. Kevan Farrow of Scream echoed the latter observation, and added that the film "[updates] the Mohawk-sporting punks of 1985's The Return of the Living Dead with moody alt-rockers."

== Production notes ==
While producer Tom Fox had intended for Return of the Living Dead Part II to be followed by sequels and create a long-lasting series, the critical and commercial underperformance of that film curtailed Fox's ambitions. Eventually Trimark Pictures picked up the rights to The Return of the Living Dead with Brian Yuzna assigned to produce and direct the film while Fox would step back into the role of executive producer. When Yuzna was hired, Trimark the company didn’t give him a set direction and only included the mandate that Trioxin Gas had to be included as a plot point to justify usage of the Living Dead name. The screenplay was written by John Penney who was hired on the basis he had served as an editor on the first The Return of the Living Dead. Early on, both Yuzna and Penney wanted to avoid rehashing the plots of the prior entries and instead shift focus to a main character who was a zombie. The movie was shot over the course of 24 days at Santa Clarita Studios from October through November 1992.

The following production notes were noted in the October 1993 issue of Fangoria magazine (#127):

- The film had a 24-day shooting schedule using two camera crews (one for principal photography, one for extensive 2nd-unit FX) at Santa Clarita Studios in Los Angeles, with Melrose Place filming next door.
- Director/producer Brian Yuzna was disappointed with the lack of screen time for his previous female monster creation in Bride of Re-Animator and wanted "Julie" to have a far bigger presence.
- Yuzna had been aiming to do a ROTLD sequel for years and was Trimark's first choice to direct.
- Brian Peck ("Scuzz" in ROTLD and various zombies in ROTLD Part II) returns to play a government agent in this film. He is the only actor to appear in all three films.
- Julie's full zombie look required 100 different pieces, an application process that originally took nine hours but was eventually cut down to six, not including glamour make-up.
- Five different FX companies (including Steve Johnson's XFX) were used during the shoot due to the tight schedule and number of effects in the film.
- Hellraiser III and Waxwork director Anthony Hickox plays one of the government scientists who is killed early in the film by a test zombie.
- The welded-metal exoskeleton worn by Riverman weighed 75 pounds and was designed by Tim Ralston.
- The film was released unrated on VHS in addition to the R-rated theatrical cut. Yuzna trimmed "between 50 and 60" seconds to get the R rating.

== Reception ==
On review aggregator website Rotten Tomatoes, the film holds an approval rating of 58% based on 12 reviews and an average rating of 5.2/10. On Metacritic, Return of the Living Dead III scored 47 out of a 100 based on five critics, indicating "mixed or average reviews".

Entertainment Weekly's Benjamin Svetkey gave the film a grade of "B+", writing that, "it's chock-full of brain-munching zombies, campy dialogue, and gross anatomical effects–but it's that touch of amore that makes this one so special". Brian J. Dillard of AllMovie wrote, "Although it features the same vaguely punk-derived fashion sense and many of the same plot elements as its predecessors, the third effort in the Return of the Living Dead series lacks much of the goofy entertainment value of the previous installments". Zombiemania: 80 Movies to Die For author Arnold T. Blumberg wrote that "Clarke tries to make the most of her after-death angst", but the film was "little more than a twisted catalogue of fetishistic imagery for horror movie aficionados keen to have a female zombie they can actually find attractive."

James Lowder reviewed Return of the Living Dead 3 in White Wolf Inphobia #55 (May, 1995), rating it a 2 out of 5 and stated that "weak internal story logic and bargain-basement dialogue make the film stutter and groan like one of the walking dead. The overlong, uninspired ending offers sequel hooks galore. But with the series' wildly erratic track record it's hard to tell if that's something worth cheering or jeering."

In 2017, Return of the Living Dead III was re-released at the London FrightFest Film Festival.
