= Ellory Elkayem =

New Zealand film director

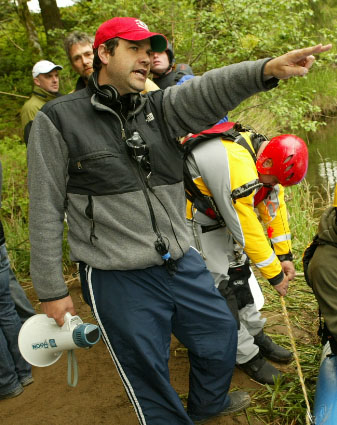
- Elkayem on set during the filming of Without a Paddle: Nature's Calling
- Born: 12 August 1970 (age 55); Christchurch, New Zealand
- Occupation(s): Film director, writer

Ellory Elkayem (born 12 August 1970) is a New Zealand film director.

Born in Christchurch, Elkayem began making films at a young age. He later attended a film school designed to give students practical experience and preparation for a career in the film business. He learned the ropes firsthand while working in the camera department on many commercials, music videos, and television shows such as The Adventures of the Black Stallion starring Mickey Rooney.

During this time, Elkayem also made several short films with support and financial assistance from the New Zealand government. His big break came with Larger than Life, a 13-minute black-and-white, FX-driven homage to the 1950s Hollywood horror genre, featuring a giant, man-eating spider.

Produced by Academy Award winner Jamie Selkirk, and financed with the largest grant of its kind from the New Zealand Film Commission, Larger than Life received critical acclaim at the 1998 Telluride Film Festival and later caught the eye of the Hollywood producers Dean Devlin and Roland Emmerich (Independence Day, Godzilla, The Day After Tomorrow), who then recruited Elkayem to write and direct Eight Legged Freaks, a $30 million feature film based on Larger than Life, starring David Arquette, Kari Wührer, and Scarlett Johansson, and distributed by Warner Bros.

He has since worked on a number of low-budget horror films, including Return of the Living Dead: Necropolis and Return of the Living Dead: Rave to the Grave sequels and Without a Paddle: Nature's Calling.

== Filmography ==
Year	Title	Director	Writer	Notes
1998	Larger Than Life	Yes	Yes	Short film
2000	They Nest	Yes		
2002	Eight Legged Freaks	Yes	Yes	
2005	Return of the Living Dead: Necropolis	Yes		
2005	Return of the Living Dead: Rave to the Grave	Yes		
2009	Without a Paddle: Nature's Calling	Yes		
