= Silent Night, Deadly Night (2025 film) =

Film by Mike P. Nelson

- Theatrical release poster
- Directed by: Mike P. Nelson
- Written by: Mike P. Nelson
- Based on: Silent Night, Deadly Night by: Michael Hickey; Paul Caimi
- Produced by: Scott Schneid; Dennis Whitehead; Jamie R. Thompson; Erik Bernard; Jeremy Torrie; Tanya Brunel
- Starring: Rohan Campbell; Ruby Modine; David Lawrence Brown; David Tomlinson; Mark Acheson
- Cinematography: Nick Junkersfeld
- Edited by: Geoff Klein
- Music by: Blitz//Berlin
- Production companies: Wonderwheel Entertainment; Sixth Dimension; New Dimension; Rebel 6 Films
- Distributed by: Cineverse (Note: Cineverse released with their Bloody Disgusting and Screambox labels.) (United States); VVS Films (Canada)
- Release dates: September 21, 2025 (Fantastic Fest); December 12, 2025 (United States)
- Running time: 96 minutes
- Countries: Canada; United States
- Language: English
- Box office: $5.6 million

Silent Night, Deadly Night is a 2025 Christmas slasher film written and directed by Mike P. Nelson. It is the second reboot of the 1984 film of the same name after Silent Night (2012), as well as the seventh overall installment of the Silent Night, Deadly Night series. The film stars Rohan Campbell as Billy Chapman, along with Ruby Modine, David Lawrence Brown, David Tomlinson, and Mark Acheson.

Silent Night, Deadly Night premiered at Fantastic Fest on September 21, 2025, and was released in the United States by Cineverse on December 12, 2025. The film received generally positive reviews from critics and has grossed $5.6 million at the box office.

== Plot ==
On Christmas Eve, eight-year-old Billy Chapman is traveling by car with his parents when the vehicle stops on a remote road. A man dressed as Santa Claus approaches and murders Billy's parents in front of him, leaving Billy alive. The killer, who is fatally stabbed by Billy's mother, is later revealed to be Charlie, a janitor working at Billy's grandfather's care home. In the aftermath, Billy comes into physical contact with Charlie, and an electrical surge appears to pass between them. Billy, who now knows that his parents murdered his grandfather for his money, is taken into care following the murders.

Years later, Billy lives a transient life, moving between towns and avoiding long-term relationships. As every Christmas approaches, he begins hearing Charlie's disembodied voice urging him to "punish" people who have been "naughty" and directing him to follow a ritual linked to an Advent calendar, instructing him to commit a killing for each day leading up to Christmas. Billy carries out the murders while wearing a Santa Claus costume.

Having killed a Christmas tree grower at a motel, Billy arrives in the town of Hackett shortly before Christmas and takes a job at a gift shop owned by Mr. Sims. There he meets Sims' daughter, Pamela "Pam", and the two begin a relationship. As the Advent calendar progresses, Billy continues committing killings, including an attack at a secret neo-Nazi Christmas party and the leader, Delphine Anderson. Pam's abusive ex-boyfriend, state trooper Max, grows suspicious of Billy after observing his behavior and his proximity to several crime scenes. At the same time, reports spread about missing children and a suspected abductor referred to as "the Snatcher." Upon investigating a car with a tied-up child inside, Mr. Sims is murdered by the Snatcher on camera.

With Pam desperate for retribution, Billy offers to fulfill her "Christmas wish". Whilst on the way to the Snatcher's location, Billy confides in Pam about his childhood trauma, describing the electrical surge he experienced when he touched the killer, explaining that the voice has guided him since then, acting as a pseudo father figure and showing him the crimes of anyone "naughty" as well as guiding him towards them. Pam accepts Billy's account and is willing to continue with Billy, returning to the Christmas tree farm per Charlie's advice. Inside, they discover three abducted and drugged children hidden in an underground ball pit. During the confrontation, Pam is captured by the Snatcher and dragged into the pit. Guided by Charlie, Billy pursues and kills the Snatcher by stabbing him with a box cutter but is stabbed during the struggle and seriously wounded.

Max arrives at the scene and fatally shoots Billy. As Billy dies, he grabs Pam's hand, and an electrical current appears to pass between the pair, causing Pam to lose consciousness. She later regains consciousness with Max and sees flashes of his past, showing her that he assisted the two Christmas tree growers in the abduction of the children. Pam attacks Max, biting off his nose, and kills him with Billy's axe. Following Max's death, Pam hears the voice of Billy in her head, asking if she is "ready for this", to which she grins.

== Cast ==
- Rohan Campbell as Billy Chapman
  - Kowen Cadorath as teen Billy
  - Logan Sawyer as young Billy
- Ruby Modine as Pamela "Pam" Sims
- Mark Acheson as Charlie
- David Lawrence Brown as Mr. Sims, Pam's father
- David Tomlinson as Max Benedict

== Production ==
Silent Night, Deadly Night serves as the second remake of the 1984 film, behind the 2012 reimagining, Silent Night, directed by Steven C. Miller. Miller initially anticipated a sequel to his film, confirming to Dread Central his intentions to return should Silent Night prove successful. Discussions occurred between the producers and Miller on a much more elaborate sequel, however Silent Night's lack of commercial success roadblocked the filmmaker's plans.

In early 2020, Joe Begos, of Almost Human and VFW, pitched a Silent Night, Deadly Night remake. Begos' pitch entailed a robotic Santa gone haywire, and was rejected for deviating too far from the original source material. Begos developed the idea on his own, which became Christmas Bloody Christmas. By March 2021, the remake was being produced by Orwo Studios and Black Hanger Studios, who previously co-produced Jeepers Creepers: Reborn. Scott Schneid and Dennis Whitehead, executive producers on the original film, were to serve as producers alongside Anthony Masi, Jake Seal, Jamie R. Thompson, and Terry Bird. Despite no director or writer publicly named at the time of its announcement, the studio slated the film for a 2022 release. By October 2022, Schneid confirmed development was still on track; with a new, unnamed, screenwriter being brought in.

Development kickstarted once again in November 2024, this time without the involvement of Black Hanger and Orwo. Wrong Turn filmmaker Mike P. Nelson was on board as writer and director with Brad Miska of Bloody Disgusting and Brandon Hill attached as executive producers. A late 2025 release window was put in place by distributor Cineverse.

Location scouting began in February 2025 in Selkirk, Carman, and Stonewall while casting was underway in Winnipeg. Rohan Campbell was cast as Billy Chapman in April 2025, a role previously portrayed by Robert Brian Wilson. That same month, Ruby Modine, Mark Acheson, David Lawrence Brown, and David Tomlinson were added to the cast. Modine was reported to be playing a colleague that Billy has unrequited feelings for. The film was financed by Bondit Media Capital and the Royal Bank of Canada.

Principal photography commenced on April 17, 2025, in Winnipeg with Nick Junkersfeld as director of photography.

== Release ==
Silent Night, Deadly Night premiered as a "secret screening" at Fantastic Fest on September 21, 2025. It was released theatrically by Cineverse on December 12, 2025. In February 2025, StudioCanal's genre label Sixth Dimension made its maiden acquisition by acquiring all rights outside North America to the film; StudioCanal will distribute directly in the U.K., Ireland, France, Germany, Australia, New Zealand, the Benelux and Poland in addition to handling sales elsewhere at the European Film Market.

== Reception ==
On the review aggregator website Rotten Tomatoes, 76% of 100 critics' reviews are positive, with an average rating of 6.2/10. The website's consensus reads: "Silent Night, Deadly Night embraces the franchise's inherent absurdity while surpassing the original with sharper filmmaking, richer characterization, and politically astute, pitch-black satire." Metacritic, which uses a weighted average, assigned the film a score of 53 out of 100, based on 16 critics, indicating "mixed or average" reviews.

== See also ==
- Christmas horror
