= December to Dismember (2006) =

World Wrestling Entertainment pay-per-view event

- Promotional poster featuring The Sandman, parodying the film Silent Night, Deadly Night
- Promotion: World Wrestling Entertainment
- Brand: Extreme Championship Wrestling
- Date: December 3, 2006
- City: Augusta, Georgia, US
- Venue: James Brown Arena
- Attendance: 4,800
- Buy rate: 90,000
- Tagline: You better watch out...

Pay-per-view chronology
← Previous; Survivor Series	Next → Armageddon

December to Dismember chronology
← Previous; 1995	Next → Final

The 2006 December to Dismember was a professional wrestling pay-per-view (PPV) event produced by World Wrestling Entertainment (WWE). It was WWE's only December to Dismember produced, but the second overall, and took place on December 3, 2006, at the James Brown Arena in Augusta, Georgia, United States. The event was held primarily for wrestlers from the ECW brand division, with some wrestlers from the Raw and SmackDown! brands also appearing.

This was the first December to Dismember held since the original 1995 event, which was a non-televised event produced by the former Extreme Championship Wrestling (ECW). In 2001, the ECW promotion folded due to financial issues, after which, WWE acquired its assets in 2003 and then relaunched ECW as its third brand in May 2006. This would be the only December to Dismember held by WWE, as well as the only to be televised, as although another event was originally planned for 2007, brand-exclusive PPVs were discontinued following WrestleMania 23 in April that year, reducing the amount of PPVs produced per year.

The main attraction on the event card was an Extreme Elimination Chamber match for the ECW World Championship. It featured wrestlers fighting in a ring surrounded by a steel structure of chain and girders. The six participants were defending champion Big Show, Bobby Lashley, Rob Van Dam, Hardcore Holly, CM Punk, and Test. Lashley won the match and the ECW World Championship after pinning Big Show following a spear. With his win, Lashley became the first African-American to hold the ECW World Championship. The featured bout on the undercard was a tag team bout between The Hardys (Jeff Hardy and Matt Hardy) and MNM (Joey Mercury and Johnny Nitro), in which The Hardys were victorious.

The event had an attendance of 4,800 and received about 90,000 pay-per-view buys, with 55,000 of them being domestic buys—the lowest buyrate in WWE history until Payback in June 2014; shortly after the introduction of the WWE Network. Critical reception was also very poor, with many regarding it as one of the worst PPVs in WWE history.

== Production ==
=== Background ===
In December 1995, the former Extreme Championship Wrestling (ECW) promotion held a non-televised professional wrestling event titled December to Dismember. This was the only December to Dismember produced by ECW as no further events were held, and then in 2001, the promotion was closed down due to financial issues and World Wrestling Entertainment (WWE) acquired its assets in 2003. In May 2006, WWE launched a third brand dubbed ECW in which former talent from the defunct promotion, as well as newer talent, would compete. WWE then revived December to Dismember as a pay-per-view (PPV) event for the ECW brand, and it was scheduled to be held on December 3, 2006, at the James Brown Arena in Augusta, Georgia.

Outside of the weekly ECW on Sci Fi broadcast, the ECW brand's television program, the pay-per-view received little buildup on either Raw or SmackDown!, as WWE concentrated more on advertising Survivor Series that aired one week prior to December to Dismember. At this time, the main storyline on the Raw brand featured tag teams, D-Generation X and Rated-RKO, and the SmackDown! brand's main storyline featured Batista and King Booker, the World Heavyweight Champion . The buildup for December to Dismember began in the middle of October, six weeks before the event.

=== Storylines ===
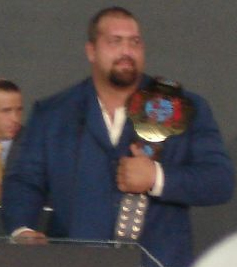
Big Show as ECW World Champion

The main event at December to Dismember featured an Extreme Elimination Chamber match for the ECW World Championship. On the October 24, 2006 episode of ECW, Rob Van Dam defeated the ECW World Champion Big Show for the second consecutive time. Per the stipulation, if Van Dam were to defeat Big Show again, in a ladder match, he could then choose a time to face the Big Show for the ECW World Championship. Van Dam chose to have his title shot at the December to Dismember pay-per-view. Authority figure, Paul Heyman, authorized Van Dam's decision and added him to the Extreme Elimination Chamber contest for the ECW World Championship along with Big Show and four other ECW superstars. The remaining four participants for the Extreme Elimination Chamber match were decided through standard singles matches. The first person to qualify for the match was Sabu, who defeated Kevin Thorn on the October 31, 2006 episode of ECW. The following week, CM Punk and Test qualified by defeating Mike Knox and Tommy Dreamer, respectively. The final place was to be given to Hardcore Holly in a contract signing segment on the November 14, 2006 episode of ECW. As Holly was making his way to the ring, Bobby Lashley, a wrestler from the SmackDown! brand, attacked Holly and signed the contract himself to gain the sixth and final place in the Extreme Elimination Chamber. Although the six spots in the bout were filled, Heyman announced an Extreme Rules match, between Van Dam and Holly, on the November 21, 2006 episode of ECW. If Holly were to defeat Van Dam he would take his place in the Extreme Elimination Chamber; Van Dam however won the match and cemented his place in the Extreme Elimination Chamber. Van Dam continued gaining momentum going into the December to Dismember pay-per-view, as he, along with team members Sabu, Lashley, John Cena and Kane, defeated the team of Big Show, Test, Umaga, Finlay and Montel Vontavious Porter in a 5-on-5, elimination tag team match, at the Survivor Series pay-per-view. On the final episode of ECW before December to Dismember, Van Dam defeated Sabu. Later in the show, CM Punk faced Test, but both men were counted out in their bout. In the main event, Big Show was disqualified in his match against Lashley as Test and Heyman's Security Force (Doug and Danny Basham) assaulted Lashley.

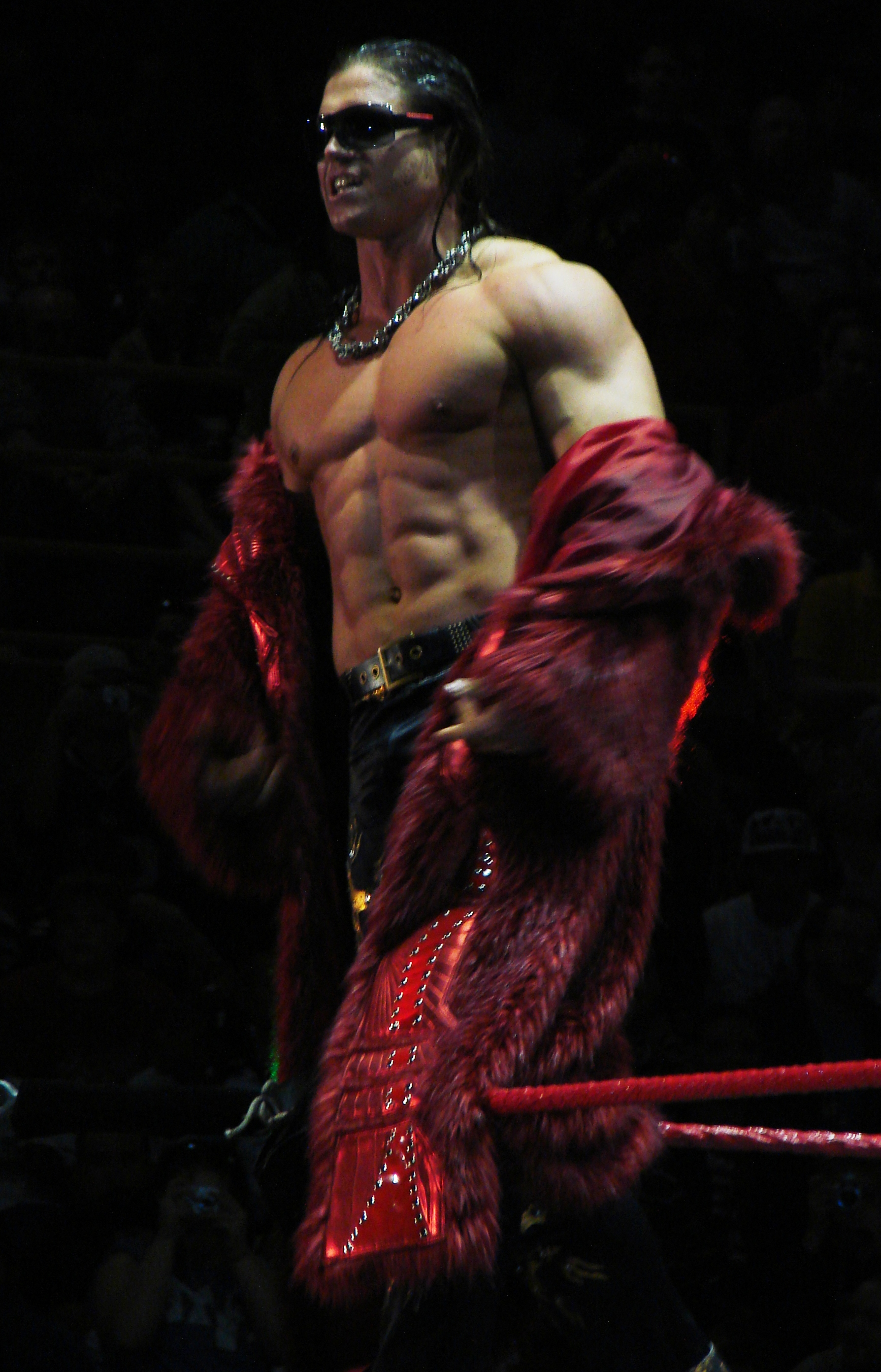
Johnny Nitro looking out to the crowd

The other main rivalry heading into December to Dismember was between the Hardy Boyz and MNM (Joey Mercury, Johnny Nitro and Melina). Unlike the Extreme Elimination Chamber rivalry, this one did not include ECW superstars and only featured members of the Raw and SmackDown! brands, making the pay-per-view non-exclusive to ECW, spanning all three WWE brands. The buildup to the match between them began when Nitro and Jeff Hardy started to feud over the Intercontinental Championship on Raw. The two competed in several different types of matches, including a ladder match. The Hardy Boyz had just teamed up for the first time since 2002, when they defeated Tony Mamaluke and Little Guido Maritato on an episode of ECW. At Survivor Series, The Hardy Boyz, along with D-Generation X and CM Punk defeated the team of Nitro, Rated-RKO (Edge and Randy Orton), Mike Knox and Gregory Helms in a traditional Survivor Series team elimination match. The next day at the December to Dismember press conference, The Hardy Boyz announced an open challenge for the pay-per-view. Later that night on Raw, Nitro accepted the challenge, announcing the return of Mercury and the "one night only" reformation of MNM. On the following episode of ECW, MNM attacked The Hardy Boyz after they defeated Elijah Burke and Sylvester Terkay. Meanwhile, Voodoo Kin Mafia, a tag team from the Total Nonstop Action Wrestling (TNA) promotion, issued a statement via the TNA website stating that they had accepted The Hardy Boyz' open challenge for December to Dismember. However, Voodoo Kin Mafia did not appear at the event, and WWE never acknowledged their challenge. Only two matches were officially announced for the pay-per-view before it aired.

== Event ==
Other on-screen personnel
Role:	Name:
Commentator	Joey Styles
Commentator	Tazz
Interviewer	Rebecca DiPietro
Ring announcer	Justin Roberts
Referees	Scott Armstrong
Referees	Mike Posey
Referees	Mickie Henson
Referees	John Cone

Before the event went live on pay-per-view, Stevie Richards defeated René Duprée in a dark match, a non-televised match used to generate excitement in the crowd.

=== Preliminary matches ===
The first match that aired was the tag team encounter between MNM (Joey Mercury and Johnny Nitro) and The Hardys (Jeff Hardy and Matt Hardy). After a back and forth match, which lasted over 20 minutes, MNM performed a flapjack DDT on Jeff. During a pinfall attempt, Matt Hardy made the save and performed a double neckbreaker on both members of MNM. Jeff then Swanton bombed Nitro and made the winning pin.

Next was Matt Striker versus Balls Mahoney in a "Striker's Rules" match, a match with "no gouging of the eyes, no pulling of the hair, no maneuvers off the top rope and, most importantly, no foul language". Mahoney won the match after he performed a spinebuster and pinned Striker for the victory.

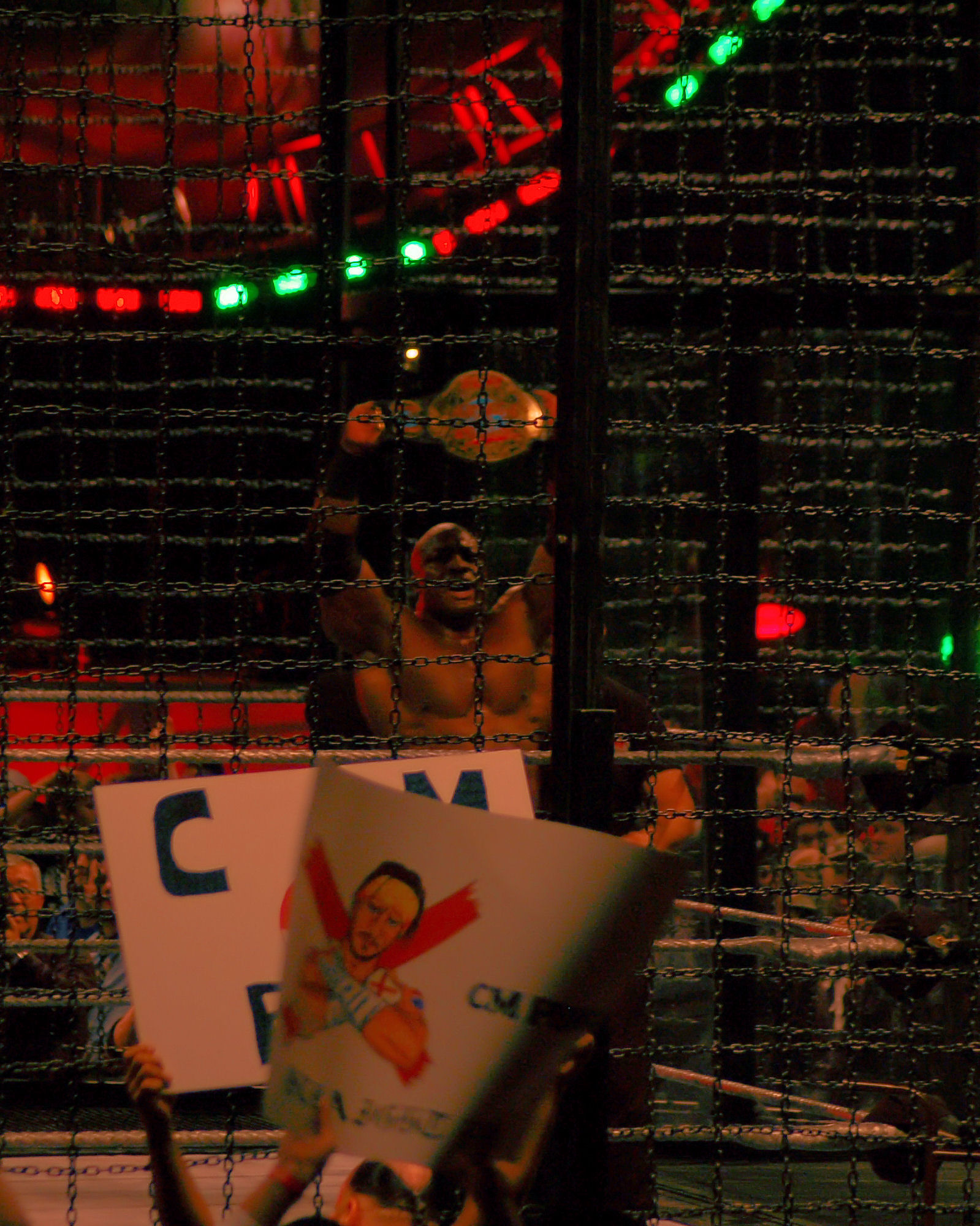
Bobby Lashley upon winning the ECW World Championship

After the match between Mahoney and Striker, Sabu was depicted as being injured backstage and unable to compete in the Extreme Elimination Chamber match. In reality, however, it was rumored that Sabu had animosity surrounding him backstage and was said to be uninterested at television tapings. Rumors evolved stating that WWE viewed Sabu as being "useless" in normal matches and that he could only perform in matches that included "stunts and tables and they don't respect him because of that". This was reportedly part of the reason he had been scripted to be easily defeated by Umaga on an episode of Raw a few weeks earlier. WWE chairman Vince McMahon wanted to put Hardcore Holly in Sabu's place, so Bobby Lashley would have more villains to overcome. Paul Heyman was legitimately unhappy with the decision, saying that Sabu's high-flying wrestling would be "the ideal showcase" inside the Extreme Elimination Chamber. The fans inside the James Brown Arena chanted "bullshit" during the segment.

In the second tag-team match of the night, Elijah Burke and Sylvester Terkay defeated F.B.I. members Little Guido Maritato and Tony Mamaluke. Burke pinned Mamaluke after performing a Forward Russian legsweep on him and gaining the pinfall. After the match, Terkay performed a Muscle Buster on Maritato. During this match, the fans inside the James Brown Arena chanted "TNA, TNA" (a reference to WWE's rival professional wrestling promotion, as well as two of their performers utilizing moves used by TNA wrestlers, Jeff Jarrett and Samoa Joe, respectively).

A standard match between Daivari and Tommy Dreamer followed with The Great Khali accompanying Daivari to the ring but was ejected from ringside early on for interfering. After Daivari won the match using a roll-up, Khali came back out to the ring and gave Dreamer a chokebomb. EMTs came out to help Dreamer get up, but he ended up getting up on his own and headed backstage.

The next match of the night was an intergender tag team match, with Kevin Thorn and Ariel against Mike Knox and Kelly Kelly. Before the match began, Kelly Kelly was shown wishing CM Punk, her on-screen crush, luck for the main event. The end of the match came when Knox abandoned Kelly Kelly in the ring and Ariel performed a legsweep, a variation of a takedown, on Kelly Kelly before covering her for the win. Following the match, Ariel and Thorn attempted to attack Kelly Kelly, before The Sandman interrupted and hit Thorn repeatedly with a kendo stick.

=== Main event match ===
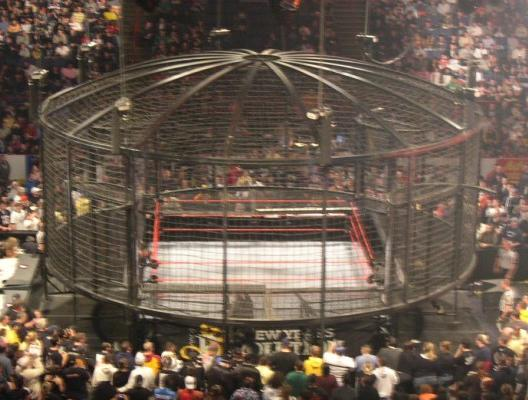
The Elimination Chamber structure

The main event was the Extreme Elimination Chamber for the ECW World Championship. After a segment earlier in the event showed an injured Sabu was unable to compete in the match, it was decided that Hardcore Holly would take his spot in the match. Before the match began, Paul Heyman announced the rules of the match and explained that each superstar had a weapon with them in each of their pods. Before entering the ring, Heyman had a conversation backstage with Big Show, that was unseen by television viewers, with him revealing that for the first time in his professional career he was not motivated to give the promo. Rob Van Dam and Holly were the first superstars to begin the match and one of the other four competitors were then released from their pod every five minutes afterward. The first person to be released from his pod was CM Punk, who entered the match with a steel chair in hand. Test then followed, five minutes after him, with a crowbar. Punk was the first eliminated from the match, after Van Dam performed a Five Star Frog Splash from the top turnbuckle and covered him for the 3-count. Moments later, Test charged and delivered a big boot to Holly, eliminating him. Van Dam was the third person eliminated, after Test delivered a diving elbow drop from the top of a pod and pinned him. When it was Bobby Lashley's turn, his pod would not open and he could not exit it because Heyman's Security Force had bolted the door shut. Lashley then used the table that was with him to smash through the pod, allowing him to escape. He then delivered a spear to Test to eliminate him. Big Show, was the final man to exit his pod and had a baseball bat wrapped in barbed wire in tow. Lashley was able to block Big Show's swing of the barbed wire bat with a folding chair and then threw him into the pod, causing him to bleed. Lashley managed to reverse a chokeslam into a DDT and then delivered a spear to win the match and become the new ECW World Champion.

== Reception ==
Critics had a negative reaction to the pay-per-view, with the only match that received praise being the Hardy Boyz versus MNM tag team match. Slam! Sports rated the pay-per-view 4 out of 10 stars, stating, "the two matches that were promoted saved this thing from being a debacle". In the 2007 Wrestling Observer Newsletter awards, the event was voted the "worst major wrestling show of the year", despite being a 2006 event, with 2006's award going to UFC 61. December to Dismember is also considered to be one of the worst PPVs in WWE history. PWInsider's Mike Johnson called it one of the worst PPVs ever.

Less than 24 hours after the pay-per-view, WWE announced on their official website that Vince McMahon had sent Paul Heyman home, citing "slumping television ratings and a disgruntled talent roster as causes for Mr. Heyman's dismissal". Heyman was escorted from the Coliseum and sent home. He was also immediately pulled from ECW's creative team after the altercation. McMahon was attempting to put the blame on Heyman for the poorly received pay-per-view despite Heyman having been overruled on multiple booking decisions, and after a meeting with Vince and Stephanie McMahon, Heyman legitimately left WWE but remained under contract. Heyman was against the decision of Bobby Lashley being booked to win the ECW World Championship, and instead wanted to have CM Punk win it, a decision McMahon disliked. This situation was cited by Punk in his controversial worked-shoot promo in 2011, in which he referred to the idea as one in which "Heyman saw something in Punk that nobody else wanted to admit." Upset at how the event turned out, Tommy Dreamer and Stevie Richards both asked after the event to be released from their contracts. Both requests were refused by McMahon and WWE's Vice President of Talent Relations John Laurinaitis.

== Aftermath ==
Not long after December to Dismember, Big Show was offered a long-term contract extension by WWE, reported to be around $1 million a year. He declined the offer, however, reasoning he was burned out and hurting physically. On the first episode of ECW to air after December to Dismember, Big Show and Bobby Lashley would compete in a rematch for the ECW World Championship. Big Show lost, thus ending their storyline feud, and he announced his retirement from wrestling, although he made his return in 2008 at No Way Out.

After the storyline feud with Big Show ended, Lashley entered a short program with Rob Van Dam, which led to Van Dam earning a title match on the January 2, 2007 episode of ECW. The match between the two ended in a No Contest after Test interfered during the bout. Test's interference led to a storyline with Lashley, leading to a title match at the Royal Rumble, which Lashley won by countout.

This was the only ECW branded pay-per-view WWE produced before the decision was made to discontinue brand-exclusive PPVs following WrestleMania 23 in April 2007, which resulted in WWE reducing the amount of yearly PPVs produced. Before the change, an event for 2007 had been planned.

== Results ==
No.	Results	Stipulations	Times
1^{D}	Stevie Richards defeated René Duprée	Singles match	—
2	The Hardys (Matt Hardy and Jeff Hardy) defeated MNM (Joey Mercury and Johnny Nitro) (with Melina)	Tag team match	22:33
3	Balls Mahoney defeated Matt Striker	Striker's Rules match	7:12
4	Elijah Burke and Sylvester Terkay defeated The F.B.I. (Little Guido and Tony Mamaluke) (with Trinity)	Tag team match	6:41
5	Daivari (with The Great Khali) defeated Tommy Dreamer	Singles match	7:22
6	Kevin Thorn and Ariel defeated Mike Knox and Kelly Kelly	Mixed tag team match	7:43
7	Bobby Lashley defeated Big Show (c) (with Paul Heyman), Test, Rob Van Dam, Hardcore Holly, and CM Punk	Extreme Elimination Chamber match for the ECW World Championship	24:42
(c) / – the champion(s) heading into the match; D / – this was a dark match

=== Elimination Chamber entrances and eliminations ===
Eliminated	Wrestler	Entered	Eliminated by	Weapon	Method	Time
1	CM Punk	3	Rob Van Dam	Steel chair	Five Star Frog Splash	12:35
2	Hardcore Holly	2	Test	None	Big Boot	12:45
3	Rob Van Dam	1	Test	None	Elbow Drop	14:15
4	Test	4	Bobby Lashley	Crowbar	Spear	19:42
5	Big Show	6	Bobby Lashley	Barbed wire baseball bat	Spear	24:42
Winner	Bobby Lashley	5	N/A	Table		

== See also ==
- List of ECW supercards and pay-per-view events
