= Silent Night, Deadly Night Part 2 =

1987 film by Lee Harry

- Theatrical release poster
- Directed by: Lee Harry
- Screenplay by: Lee Harry; Joseph H. Earle
- Story by: Lee Harry; Joseph H. Earle; Dennis Patterson; Lawrence Appelbaum
- Based on: Characters by: Michael Hickey; Paul Caimi
- Produced by: Lawrence Appelbaum
- Starring: Eric Freeman; James L. Newman; Elizabeth Kaitan; Jean Miller
- Cinematography: Harvey Genkins
- Edited by: Lee Harry
- Music by: Michael Armstrong
- Production company: Lawrence Appelbaum Productions
- Distributed by: Silent Night Releasing Corporation; Ascot Entertainment
- Release date: April 10, 1987
- Running time: 88 minutes
- Country: United States
- Language: English
- Budget: $250,000
- Box office: $154,323

Silent Night, Deadly Night Part 2 is a 1987 American slasher film directed by Lee Harry. It is the sequel to 1984's Silent Night, Deadly Night and the second installment in the franchise. The film stars Eric Freeman, James L. Newman, Elizabeth Kaitan, and Jean Miller. Its plot focuses on Ricky Caldwell (Freeman), the brother of Billy Chapman, and his own trauma regarding his parents' Christmas Eve murders, which triggers his own killing spree. The film uses approximately 25 minutes of archive footage from the original film as flashbacks.

Lee Harry, the film's director and one of the screenwriters, was hired by the film's producers to reedit the original into a "new" film, in addition to asking for a $250K budget and a schedule of 10 days for shooting additional footage. Actor Eric Freeman would later admit to having regret taking part in the film's production, initially being misled to believe the film was more comedic. In the United Kingdom, the British Board of Film Classification refused to certify the film, rendering it banned until 2020 where it was released uncut as an 18 certificate.

The film received a limited theatrical release in the United States on April 10, 1987, distributed by Ascot Entertainment. Part 2 was panned by critics who criticized its plot, Freeman's performance, and the film's use of archival footage. It grossed $154,000, rending it a financial failure. It has since been regarded as one of the worst films of all time, among the worst Christmas movies ever made, and one of the worst sequels produced. Retrospective reviews have considered the film a campy cult classic.

== Plot ==
On Christmas Eve four years after the events of the first film, Ricky Caldwell (né Chapman), the now-adult brother of serial killer Billy Chapman, is being held in a psychiatric hospital for a series of murders he himself committed. While being interviewed by the psychiatrist Dr. Henry Bloom, Ricky tells the story of the murders his elder brother committed throughout a series of several flashbacks.

After this, Ricky tells his own story: after Billy's death, he was adopted by the Rosenbergs, a Jewish family and given a good upbringing, but his trauma was never addressed. After his adoptive father's death, Ricky loses his composure and commits a series of random murders, targeting people who are "naughty". A chance for a normal life seems to appear when he starts dating Jennifer Statson, but an unpleasant encounter with Jennifer's ex-boyfriend Chip sends Ricky over the edge. He kills Chip by electrocuting him with jumper cables attached to a car, while Jennifer watches in horror, and then strangles Jennifer to death with the car antenna after she screams that she hates him. A security officer witnesses this and as Ricky is about to be arrested, he grabs the officer's revolver and shoots him in the forehead, before going on a shooting spree. He kills at least three more people throughout the neighborhood, including one man taking out his garbage. Eventually, Ricky finds himself in a stand-off with the police, and attempts suicide before being arrested.

Upon finishing his recollection to Dr. Bloom, Ricky strangles Dr. Bloom to death using audio tape and escapes from the mental hospital. He murders a Salvation Army Santa and steals his costume. Ricky plans to kill Mother Superior, the nun who abused Billy as a child, and whom Billy failed to murder four years earlier. After chasing Mother Superior throughout her house, Ricky succeeds in decapitating her with an axe. Ricky cleans up the blood and stages the scene, with Mother Superior sitting in a chair, her severed head balanced on her body. As soon as this is discovered by the police officers that arrive on the scene, a screaming Ricky leaps out and prepares to attack, but is shot down out the patio door. Sister Mary wakes up, and the police officer tells her, "He's gone, Sister. It's over." Then she turns over and sees Mother Superior's severed head, before screaming in terror.

Ricky suddenly opens his eyes and smiles devilishly, indicating that he survived his gunshot wounds.

== Cast ==
- Eric Freeman as Ricky Caldwell
  - Darrel Guilbeau as Ricky Caldwell (age 15)
  - Brian Michael Henley as Ricky Caldwell (age 10)
- James L. Newman as Dr. Henry Bloom
- Elizabeth Kaitan as Jennifer Stetson
- Jean Miller as Mother Superior
- Corrine Gelfan as Mrs. Rosenberg
- Michael Combatti as Mr. Rosenberg
- Ken Weichert as Chip
- Ron Moriarty as Detective
- Frank Novak as Loan Shark
- Randall Boffman as Eddie
- Joanne White as Paula
- Lenny Rose as Loser
- Nadya Wynd as Sister Mary
- Kenneth McCabe as Rent-A-Cop
- Harvey Genkins as Salvation Santa

== Production ==
Lee Harry, who had not previously directed a film, was hired by the producers to re-edit the original Silent Night, Deadly Night into a "new" film intended as a sequel. Along with co-writer Joseph H. Earle, Harry persuaded the studio to provide a budget of $250,000 and a ten-day shooting schedule for additional footage to be incorporated with the first film's scenes. Principal photography took place in Los Angeles and Sierra Madre, California in January 1987.

David Heavener auditioned for the role of Ricky Caldwell but ultimately the producers decided to cast Eric Freeman. In 2017, Freeman recalled: "I took it this was going to be a comedic horror film. If I had seen the original prior to acting in this one, I wouldn't have done the type of work I did. [...] It was a few days of work and I think a $1,500 paycheck. I didn't think this was going to be some big break for me. My life at that time was to stay in great shape and eat healthy and I was shooting for a different life in the business."

== Release ==
The film was released on VHS and laserdisc in the United States by International Video Entertainment in September 1987.

It was released on DVD on October 7, 2003, from Anchor Bay Entertainment, in a double-feature disc alongside the original Silent Night, Deadly Night, but was discontinued due to copyright problems, and went out of print. On December 4, 2012, Anchor Bay reissued it alongside the first film as a two-disc "Christmas Survival Double Feature", containing the same archival bonus features as the 2003 release.

In the United Kingdom, the film was declined a certificate by the BBFC after the distributors refused to make the cuts required for an '18' certificate. The ban was lifted in 2020 when the film was released uncut with an 18 certificate.

On December 11, 2018, Shout! Factory under its Scream Factory label released the film in a two-disc set collector's edition on Blu-ray. It features a new 2K transfer of an archival theatrical print, with flashback footage of the first movie being taken from the same 4K master released by Shout! Factory in 2017. It contains new special features produced by Justin Beahm's Reverend Entertainment such as interviews with director Lee Harry, actors Eric Freeman, James Newman, Elizabeth Kaitan, Darrel Guilbeau, Kenny McCabe and makeup effect artist Christopher Biggs. It also contains special features from the 2004 and 2012 DVD releases as well. Scream Factory also released the film in a limited edition collector set that is limited to 2,000 orders. It contains the Blu-ray set along with an 18x24 poster of the Blu-ray's artwork cover and an 8" action figure of Ricky Caldwell.

== Reception ==
=== Box office ===
The film received a limited release theatrically in the United States on April 10, 1987. It grossed $154,323 at the box office.

=== Critical response ===
On Rotten Tomatoes, the film has an approval rating of 30% rating, out of 10 reviews. Slant Magazine's Eric Henderson wrote: "Whereas Robert Brian Wilson’s Billy was a handsomely cut but hammy lead, Eric Freeman’s Ricky is a [...] muscle monster who takes overacting to eyebrow-lifting new levels". Emmett O'Regan of Comic Book Resources also selected it as the worst movie ever made, and an article in Paste asserted that: "in terms of filmmaking quality—it’s hard to believe that in terms of pure, unadulterated crap, anything could ever surpass it." Additionally, /Film, and Paste have all listed it as the worst Christmas film ever made.

== Legacy ==
The scene where Ricky Caldwell shoots and murders a bystander taking out the trash while exclaiming "Garbage Day!" became an Internet meme after being uploaded to YouTube during its early years. Several outlets have regarded the film as "so bad its good" in the years after its release.

== Sequel ==
A sequel titled Silent Night, Deadly Night 3: Better Watch Out!, was released in 1989. The character of Ricky (played by Bill Moseley) reappeared in it, wrapping up the Chapman siblings arc for the franchise.

== See also ==
- List of 20th century films considered the worst
- List of Christmas films
