= No Fog West Theater Company =

US non-profit theater company

No Fog West Theater is a non-profit theater company run by students from Vassar College in Poughkeepsie, New York, United States. It was founded in December 2006.

The company "believe[s] that theater is an ideal and underused forum in which to inspire social change and self-awareness [and] attempt[s] to use [its] productions as an instrument in promoting pro-compassion, non-confrontational discussions about pertinent and important issues affecting us as human beings."

== The Laramie Project ==
No Fog West Theater's first production was The Laramie Project by Moisés Kaufman and Tectonic Theater Project in Sheridan, Wyoming in July 2007. Ten students from around the country came to perform and direct: five from Vassar College, one from the University of Puget Sound, and four from the Sheridan area. Although the play is one of the most frequently performed in the country, it had been staged in Wyoming only a few times. No Fog West Theater's show ran for two weeks at the Carriage House Theater in Sheridan in July 2007. In addition to the play, the company hosted a community forum on the community's responsibility towards the prevention of hate and prejudice. They invited a minister, a state legislator, a school board member, and a psychologist to sit on a panel and discuss these issues with the community. The company also marched in the Sheridan Rodeo Parade.

Through their approach to theater and attention received from The Laramie Project, No Fog West's board of directors met with theater professionals from around the country, including Philip Himberg from Sundance Theater and Nancy Borgenicht, co-creator of Saturday's Voyeur, who guided them in the planning of their second production, a summer 2008 tour of Talking to Terrorists by Robin Soans.

== Talking to Terrorists ==
First performed by the Out of Joint theatre company in London, Talking to Terrorists "is entirely composed of interwoven testimonies - from ex-terrorists and former freedom fighters (distinguishing between those two categories being itself sometimes a dilemma); from the victims of terrorism (whether it be Lady Tebbit, who has had to use a wheelchair following the Brighton bombing, or those people who were recruited into terrorism, or drafted into brutal armies, when too young or damaged to resist). We hear from people all over the world - from the ex-head of the Al-Aqsa Martyrs Brigade in Bethlehem to a former member of the National Resistance Army in Uganda to Craig Murray, the ex-British Ambassador who was recalled from Tashkent by the Foreign Office because of his uncompromising views on the violation of human rights in Uzbekistan, and who is standing against the Foreign Secretary."

Robin Soans has appeared in eighty plays and has performed in the National Theatre, The Royal Court, The Royal Shakespeare Company, the Hampstead Theatre, The Tricycle, The Bush and The Young Vic. He has made thirty television appearances and been in twelve films. In 2000, he wrote A State Affair for Out of Joint. It went on two nationals tours, had two runs at Soho Theatre and was invited to be performed in the House of Lords.

No Fog West Theater's connections in Sheridan led to a residency at the Ucross Foundation, home of Sundance Theatre's Writers Retreat. After this three-week rehearsal residency, the company toured for three weeks, stopping in Sheridan, Wyoming, Salt Lake City, Utah, and McCall, Idaho for three weeks in August 2008.

== The Company ==
No Fog West Theater is run by a permanent board of directors: Grace Cannon, Production Director; Max Hershenow, Artistic Director; and Madeleine Joyce, Secretary. Actors are selected by audition for individual projects.

=== The Laramie Project Cast ===
Adam Colton, Christine Hottinger, Angie Prichard, Mike Marshall, Austin Bramwell, Anne Gordon, Jordan Coffey, Grace Cannon, Madeleine Joyce and Max Hershenow, Director.

=== Talking to Terrorists Cast ===
Jamie Watkins, Baize Buzan, Nijae Draine, Nathan Birnbaum, Grace Cannon, Madeleine Joyce, Adam Colton, Mike Marshall, Becky Katz, Road Manager, and Max Hershenow, Director.
