= Psycho Killer (film) =

2026 film by Gavin Polone

- Theatrical release poster
- Directed by: Gavin Polone
- Written by: Andrew Kevin Walker
- Produced by: Roy Lee; Matt Berenson; Andrew Kevin Walker; Arnon Milchan
- Starring: Georgina Campbell; James Preston Rogers; Malcolm McDowell
- Cinematography: Magnus Jønck
- Edited by: Derek Ambrosi
- Music by: Sven Faulconer
- Production companies: Regency Enterprises; New Regency; Constantin Film; Vertigo Entertainment
- Distributed by: 20th Century Studios
- Release date: February 20, 2026
- Running time: 91 minutes
- Countries: United States; Germany
- Language: English
- Budget: $10 million
- Box office: $2.56 million

Psycho Killer is a 2026 horror-thriller film directed by Gavin Polone in his feature directorial debut, and written by Andrew Kevin Walker. The film stars Georgina Campbell, James Preston Rogers, and Malcolm McDowell. The story follows a police officer on her mission to take down a serial killer known as "the Satanic Slasher" after he murdered her state trooper husband.

Psycho Killer was released theatrically in the United States by 20th Century Studios on February 20, 2026. The film received negative reviews from critics, though Campbell's performance was praised.

== Plot ==
Kansas Highway Patrol officer Jane Archer witnesses her husband, Mike, being murdered by a serial killer dubbed by the media as the "Satanic Slasher" due to the occult symbols left behind at the crime scenes. She becomes obsessed with tracking him down and bringing him to justice.

The Slasher is heavily implied to be a murderous Satanic preacher named Richard Joshua Reeves, who held his congregation hostage and then killed them, but he was said to have died in prison. The Slasher murders a female pharmacist in a small town and raids the pharmacy for a variety of antidepressants and other drugs, which he consumes in large quantities. Later, he murders two stranded motorists on a country road, before violently killing a Catholic priest and drinking his blood. Jane tracks the Slasher's killing spree, which began on the west coast, across the Midwest. During her travels, Jane discovers that she is pregnant with Mike's child.

In Nebraska, Jane finds the Slasher staying in a motel, where he attacks her before fleeing. The Slasher goes to a Satanist mansion run by a man named Mr. Pendleton. The Slasher uses Marvin, an assistant and adherent to Pendleton, to track down Leonard Wilkes, the manager of a nuclear power plant in Harrisburg, Pennsylvania. He then kills Pendleton and his followers, except for Marvin.

The Slasher's goal is ultimately revealed to be to destroy the Harrisburg plant operated by Leonard by self-detonating in a suicide mission to "open the gates of Hell" and appease Satan. Jane catches up to him and warns the other guards after he uses the man to get him into the control room to carry out his deed by setting off explosives. Jane breaks through the window of the control room and manages to incapacitate the Slasher by shooting him.

Jane is left traumatized from her ordeal, while the Slasher is revealed to be Reeves, who is brought to a prison in Death Valley, California, where his spree began.

== Cast ==
- Georgina Campbell as Jane Archer
- James Preston Rogers as Richard Joshua Reeves / the Satanic Slasher
- Malcolm McDowell as Mr. Pendleton
- Logan Miller as Marvin
- Grace Dove as Agent Becky Collins
- Aaron Merke as Leonard Wilkes
- Nigel Shawn Williams as Mr. Archer, Jane's father
- David Tomlinson as State Trooper

== Production ==
=== Development ===
The project was in development for several years and with different filmmakers. An early draft of the script, written by Andrew Kevin Walker, appeared online in 2007. In March 2009, Fred Durst announced that he was going to direct the film, scheduled to begin shooting in August 2009. In June 2009, Durst said that Psycho Killer would be his next film. However, by November 2010, Gavin Polone was set to direct the film instead, and that Eli Roth and Eric Newman would produce it, with StudioCanal attached to fully finance the film with a budget estimated between $13 and 17 million. Shooting was expected to begin in Michigan late in the second quarter of 2011. Roth was still attached to the project up until 2011. In May 2015, it was reported that Germany's K5 International would finance and produce the film.

In February 2023, it was reported that New Regency had greenlit the film with Walker, Roy Lee, Miri Yoon, and Matt Berenson producing, and that shooting was expected to begin early in the second quarter, while reiterating that Polone would direct the film, marking his feature directorial debut. Constantin Film and Vertigo Entertainment co-produced the film. Sven Faulconer composed the score.

=== Casting ===
In November 2010, it was reported that the film was in the midst of casting, with the producers expecting to cast a rising actress "who audiences are familiar with, but don't know as a star just yet" to play the lead. The actress' name was not revealed. In February 2023, it was reported that Georgina Campbell would play the film's lead. In March 2023, Logan Miller joined the cast and would play Marvin, described as "a goth-type nebbish who works for the mysterious Pendleton in his massive mansion", and that Campbell would play police officer Jane Archer, who is on a mission to take down a serial killer known as "the Satanic Slasher" following the murder of her state trooper husband. Former professional wrestler James Preston Rogers stars as the title character, a serial killer known as "the Satanic Slasher". In October 2025, following the release of the first trailer, Malcolm McDowell and Grace Dove were announced as part of the cast.

=== Filming ===
On a production budget of under $10 million, principal photography began in Winnipeg in March 23, 2023, and wrapped on April 26.

== Release ==
=== Theatrical ===
Psycho Killer had an early screening at the Aero Theatre on February 18, 2026, and was released theatrically in the United States by 20th Century Studios on February 20, 2026.

=== Home media ===
The film was released on digital on April 7, 2026. The film is also available streaming on Hulu on May 29.

== Reception ==
=== Box office ===
Psycho Killer had little to no marketing prior to its release. In the United States and Canada, the film was released alongside I Can Only Imagine 2. It was released in 1,100 theaters in the United States and debuted at number 11 at the box office, grossing $1.6 million in its first weekend.

=== Critical response ===
The film received mostly negative reviews from critics, though Georgina Campbell's performance was often praised. On the review aggregator website Rotten Tomatoes, 9% of 46 critics' reviews are positive, with an average rating of 3.2/10. The website's consensus reads: "Qu'est-ce que c'est? Better run, run, run, run, run, run, run away." Metacritic, which uses a weighted average, assigned the film a score of 26 out of 100, based on eight critics, indicating "generally unfavorable" reviews. Psycho Killer was not screened for critics prior to its release.

William Bibbiani of TheWrap wrote, "It's a rudimentary cat-and-mouse thriller with laughable ideas about Satanism and an absurd, cringy ending." Adding; "Campbell heroically plays Archer like there's something to actually play. It's tragic when a movie gives a talented performer nothing, and it's admirable that Campbell tries, at least, to make "nothingade."" Nicholas Laskin of The Playlist gave the film a "D" rating and wrote that Campbell is "doing the best with what she's given", and called the film "dull" and "curiously muted".

Meagan Navarro of Bloody Disgusting gave the film 1.5 out of 5 stars, calling it "vapid" and "generic", but praised the film's production design and its cast, writing; "Campbell and Rogers bring enough screen presence to engage, despite being saddled with paper-thin characters prone to making baffling choices. Logan Miller injects warmth and a sense of humor in his brief supporting role, teasing a much stronger and more entertaining film had Polone not taken the material so stone-cold serious."

Josh Korngut of Dread Central gave the film two out of five stars and wrote, "For a script from one of our most important living screenwriters, Psycho Killer feels strangely dated. It leans on familiar genre devices and never meaningfully reframes them." Korngut also praised Campbell, writing; "Campbell usually grounds it all with a performance that feels thoughtful and steady. She plays Jane with intelligence and restraint. She does her best to communicate doubt without collapsing into fragility. And it works. But still, the script is constantly attempting to flatten her out, and resists permitting her character depth or the ability to activate." Ross Bonaime of Collider called it "a collection of overdone tropes and ridiculous choices, all centered around a bland horror villain who's a composite of other, better killers. Psycho Killer might be the most embarrassing murderer in Walker's oeuvre of antagonists."

Tyler Nichols of JoBlo.com wrote that the film "was completely barren of any tension, and that's probably because there was no one to care about." And that Campbell "does the best she can here, but Jane is just poorly written all around. She's really hard to root for, especially after finding out she's pregnant with her dead husband's baby, and still opts to sloppily chase down a serial killer." Adding; "Every performance around her ranges from okay to bad, with some line readings making me literally laugh out loud. The characters are all such cardboard cutouts. Even Malcolm McDowell is in a completely thankless role that comes and goes from the story with very little consequence."

Robert Kojder of Flickering Myth gave the film two stars and wrote; "Georgina Campbell is delivering a solid performance as a woman desperate for another shot, literally and figuratively, at the killer, and subconsciously, trying to prove herself and male-dominated workforce that doesn't take much of what she says seriously", and "the few encounters she and the killer do have are largely forgettable outside the stark red color palette and satanic iconography. That also puts into perspective that the problem with the film is less so with the direction or performances."
