= David Tomlinson (Canadian actor) =

Canadian actor

- Tomlinson at the 76th Primetime Emmy Awards
- Born: Toronto, Canada
- Occupation: Actor
- Years active: 2017–present

David Tomlinson is a Canadian actor best known for portraying Eddie Kofler in the Paramount+ miniseries Fellow Travelers (2023) and for his role as the main antagonist in the slasher reboot film Silent Night, Deadly Night (2025).

Other roles include appearances in the Amazon series Cross (2026), the slasher film Psycho Killer (2026), and the action comedy film Mike & Nick & Nick & Alice (2026). Tomlinson began his career appearing in short films from 2017 onward before transitioning into television and feature film roles. In September 2026, Tomlinson was announced as Cody Kent in the second season of Heated Rivalry.

== Filmography ==
Key
| † | Denotes works that have not yet been released |

=== Film ===
| Year | Title | Role | Notes | Ref. |
|---|---|---|---|---|
| 2025 | Silent Night, Deadly Night | Max Benedict | | |
| 2026 | War Machine | Briggs | | |
| 2026 | Psycho Killer | State Trooper | | |
| 2026 | Mike & Nick & Nick & Alice | Stoic Male Bartender | | |

=== Television ===
| Year | Title | Role | Notes | Ref. |
|---|---|---|---|---|
| 2021 | Dark Side of the Ring | Steve Borden | 2 episodes; documentary series | |
| 2023 | Sex/Life | Athletic Guy | Episode: "Future Starts Today" | |
| 2023 | Fellow Travelers | Eddie Kofler | 2 episodes | |
| 2025 | Devil in Disguise: John Wayne Gacy | Triverman | Episode: "Samuel and Randy" | |
| 2026 | Cross | Bruce Folsom | Episode: "Climb" | |
| 2027 | Heated Rivalry † | Cody Kent | Season 2 | |
