= Silent Night, Deadly Night =

1984 film by Charles E. Sellier, Jr

- Theatrical release poster
- Directed by: Charles E. Sellier Jr.
- Written by: Michael Hickey
- Based on: Slayride by Paul Caimi
- Produced by: Ira Richard Barmak; Scott Schneid; Dennis Whitehead
- Starring: Lilyan Chauvin; Gilmer McCormick; Toni Nero; Robert Brian Wilson
- Cinematography: Henning Schellerup
- Edited by: Michael Spence
- Music by: Perry Botkin
- Production company: Slayride Productions Inc.
- Distributed by: Tri-Star Pictures
- Release date: November 9, 1984
- Running time: 79 minutes (Note: The original R-rated theatrical cut of the film runs 79 minutes long. The unrated cut which was first released in 2003 on DVD runs 85 minutes in length.)
- Country: United States
- Language: English
- Budget: $750,000
- Box office: $2.5 million

Silent Night, Deadly Night is a 1984 American Christmas slasher film directed by Charles E. Sellier Jr., and starring Robert Brian Wilson, Lilyan Chauvin, Gilmer McCormick, Toni Nero and Linnea Quigley. The film follows the life of Billy Chapman, who, as a child, witnesses his parents' brutal double murder on Christmas Eve by a man disguised as Santa Claus. His subsequent upbringing in a dysfunctional Catholic orphanage and untreated post-traumatic stress disorder lead him toward a psychological breakdown in adulthood, and he emerges as a spree killer donning a Santa suit during the holiday.

Inspired by a draft screenplay by Paul Caimi, producers Scott Schneid and Dennis Whitehead developed the story for the film over the course of several years, eventually commissioning screenwriter Michael Hickey to complete a redeveloped screenplay. Producer Ira Barmak, who had recently secured a contract to produce several low-budget films for Tri-Star Pictures, became attached to the project. Principal photography occurred mainly in Heber City and Midway, Utah in the late spring of 1984 under the working title Slayride.

Silent Night, Deadly Night received significant controversy from the public due to its graphic depiction of a killer clad in a Santa suit, an element that was highlighted in the film's promotional artwork and television advertisements. As a result, it initially received scathing reviews from critics which fueled the public backlash even further. Tri-Star Pictures released the film in a limited theatrical release on November 9, 1984 in the Midwestern and Northeastern United States with the hopes of giving it a more wider release later in December. However, the controversy and public backlash caused Tri-Star to pull the film out of theaters just a week after its initial release and the planned wide release was cancelled. Despite its brief release, the film was a modest financial success, earning $2.5 million against a $750,000 budget.

The film has gone on to develop a cult following and spawned a series, consisting of four sequels, as well as a loose remake in 2012 and a reboot in 2025.

== Plot ==
On Christmas Eve 1971, five-year-old Billy Chapman and his family visit a nursing home in Utah where his catatonic grandfather lives. When Billy's parents Jim and Ellie leave the room, his grandfather suddenly awakens and tells Billy to fear Santa Claus, as he punishes the naughty.

On the way back home, a criminal dressed in a Santa suit—who had just robbed a liquor store and killed the owner Mr. Levitt—attempts to carjack the family. As Jim tries to drive away, the criminal shoots him dead and attempts to sexually assault Ellie; when she hits him, he slits her throat with a switchblade. Billy flees and hides, leaving his baby brother Ricky in the car.

Three years later, in December 1974, eight-year-old Billy and four-year-old Ricky are celebrating Christmas in an orphanage run by Mother Superior, a strict disciplinarian who beats children who misbehave and considers punishment to be a "good" thing. Sister Margaret, who sympathizes with the children, tries to help Billy, but he is regularly punished. On Christmas, the orphanage invites a man in a Santa Claus suit to visit the children; Billy, forced to sit on his lap by Mother Superior, punches the man before fleeing to his room in horror.

Ten years later, in the spring of 1984, Billy, now eighteen, leaves the orphanage and obtains a job as a stock boy at a local toy store, with support from Sister Margaret. At the store, he develops a crush on his co-worker Pamela; he has sexual thoughts which are often interrupted by morbid visions of his parents' murders. On Christmas Eve, the employee who plays the store's Santa Claus is injured and Billy's boss Mr. Sims makes him take his place. After the store closes, the staff has a Christmas Eve party. Billy, still in a Santa Claus suit, tries to have a good time, but is troubled by memories of his parents' murders, causing him to feel depressed. He watches as his co-workers Andy and Pamela kiss and depart to the stock room. Billy follows them and witnesses Andy attempting to rape Pamela. This triggers his insanity; Billy strangles Andy with a string of Christmas lights and, declaring that punishment is "good", murders Pamela with a box cutter.

Next, Billy murders Mr. Sims and his manager, Mrs. Helen Randall. Sister Margaret discovers the carnage and goes to the police station to seek help. Billy breaks into a nearby house where a young couple named Denise and Tommy are having sex and a little girl named Cindy is sleeping; he impales Denise on a set of deer antlers and throws Tommy through a window. When this awakens Cindy, Billy asks if she has been nice or naughty; she says nice, and he gives her the box cutter he had used earlier. After this, he witnesses bullies Bob and Mac picking on Doug and Jim, two teenage boys and stealing their sleds, and decapitates Mac with his axe.

The next morning, Captain Richards and Sister Margaret deduce Billy will go to the orphanage, where Ricky is still living. Officer Barnes responds to orders to secure the orphanage and kills a pastor, Father O'Brien, who was dressed in a Santa outfit, mistaking him for Billy. As Barnes continues patrolling the area, he is struck in the chest by Billy's axe. Billy confronts Mother Superior, now in a wheelchair. Just as he prepares to kill her, Richards shoots him in the back. Billy drops to the floor and tells the children, "You're safe now, Santa Claus is gone", before dying from his injuries. A fourteen-year-old Ricky, scowling at Mother Superior, utters, "Naughty."

== Cast ==
- Lilyan Chauvin as Mother Superior
- Gilmer McCormick as Sister Margaret
- Toni Nero as Pamela
- Robert Brian Wilson as Billy Chapman, age 18
  - Danny Wagner as Billy Chapman, age 8
  - Jonathan Best as Billy Chapman, age 5
- Alex Burton as Richard "Ricky" Chapman
  - Max Broadhead as Four-Year-Old Ricky Chapman
  - Melissa Best as Infant Ricky Chapman
- Britt Leach as Mr. Sims
- Nancy Borgenicht as Mrs. Helen Randall
- Linnea Quigley as Denise
- Leo Geter as Tommy
- Randy Stumpf as Andy
- Will Hare as Grandpa Chapman
- Tara Buckman as Ellie Chapman
- Jeff Hansen as Jim Chapman
- Charles Dierkop as Killer Santa
- Eric Hart as Mr. Levitt
- Amy Stuyvesant as Cindy
- Max Robinson as Officer Barnes
- Vince Massa as Doug
- Michael Alvarez as Jim
- John Bishop as Bob
- Richard Terry as Mac
- Spencer Alston as Orphanage Santa
- Don Shanks as Window Santa

== Themes ==
Silent Night, Deadly Night has been noted for its nuanced depiction of post-traumatic stress disorder, child abuse, and untreated mental illness.

Ryan Doom, assessing the film's themes in a retrospective for JoBlo.com, notes, "instead of giving the audience a throwaway back story, the first act gives us a true psychological examination of childhood trauma and how if not treated, well damn. Watch out." In a retrospective for The A.V. Club, Greg Cwik similarly notes that the film is unique among other slasher films of its time because of "the effort the film puts into establishing and exploring the psychological depths of its Santa-dressed killer... [none of its] scarier, bloodier, better-made contemporaries ever conjured an idea as genuinely nasty as a priest dressed as Santa (a deaf priest, for added amorality) getting shot by a cop in front of a gaggle of orphans. These parentless kids, playing in dirty snow, are spritzed with blood, likely suffering the kind of trauma that defined Billy."

In a piece for Dread Central, Jenn Adams acknowledges the character of Billy Chapman (Robert Brian Wilson) as an antihero protagonist, but considers the Mother Superior (Lilyan Chauvin) as the "true villain" of the film, as her stern, often abusive methods of discipline contribute to Billy's warped understanding of punishment and wrongdoing: "The Mother Superior is made all the more terrifying by the fact that she feels so familiar. We’re constantly bombarded by judgment from self-aggrandizing women and people in positions of power who believe that any behavior not aligned with their strict worldview must be rooted out with shame and scorn... [The film]'s horrific villain becomes a lesson in the pain and destruction caused by unflinching cruelty and strict puritanical belief."

== Production ==
=== Development ===
The concept of the film was pitched by executive producer Scott J. Schneid, then an employee of the William Morris Agency in Beverly Hills. Schneid was inspired by a screenplay for a similar Santa-themed slasher film titled He Sees You When You're Sleeping, written by Paul Caimi. Based on Caimi's screenplay, Schneid and co-writer Dennis Whitehead redeveloped the story together, incorporating a backstory for the film's villain, Billy Chapman, which details his childhood trauma of witnessing his parents Jim and Ellie's murders on Christmas by a killer in a Santa Claus costume. They also incorporated Billy's narrative arc in the aftermath of his parents' murder as he is raised under the supervision of Mother Superior, an abusive nun in an orphanage, which contributes to his deteriorating mental state spanning childhood to adulthood.

Schneid and Whitehead commissioned screenwriter Michael Hickey, a recent New York University film school graduate, to write a spec script based on their ideas. The 30-page treatment project by Hickey, tentatively titled Slayride, was expanded into a full screenplay after Schneid and Whitehead raised $30,000 to pay Hickey the minimum as mandated by the Writers Guild of America. Hickey stated that he was inspired by Stanley Kubrick's The Shining (1980) while completing the screenplay, as it also features a mentally-unstable man, Jack Torrance (Jack Nicholson), driven to commit murder.

By late 1982, Schneid and Whitehead began seeking funding for the film. Whitehead's brother, an employee for the production company ICM, connected them with producer Ira Barmak, who had at that time secured a deal to produce several low-budget films for Tri-Star Pictures, a then-new studio created by CBS, Coca-Cola, and HBO. Schneid and Whitehead signed a contract agreement with Barmak which excluded them as executive producers, a decision they later stated was a mistake and left them "frozen out of the project" (decades later in 2019, after Barmak's 1993 death and the film's rights being held by a group of private investors, Schneid reacquired the rights to the film).

Schneid and Whitehead had originally considered Albert Magnoli, Stuart Margolin and Ken Kwapis as directors for the film. Charles E. Sellier, Jr., a former senior vice president of marketing at Utah's Sunn Classic Pictures, was ultimately hired through Barmak to direct the project. Sunn Classic, which had gone out of business prior to the film's release, was known for producing family-friendly entertainment, namely The Life and Times of Grizzly Adams (1974), which Sellier had co-produced.

=== Casting ===
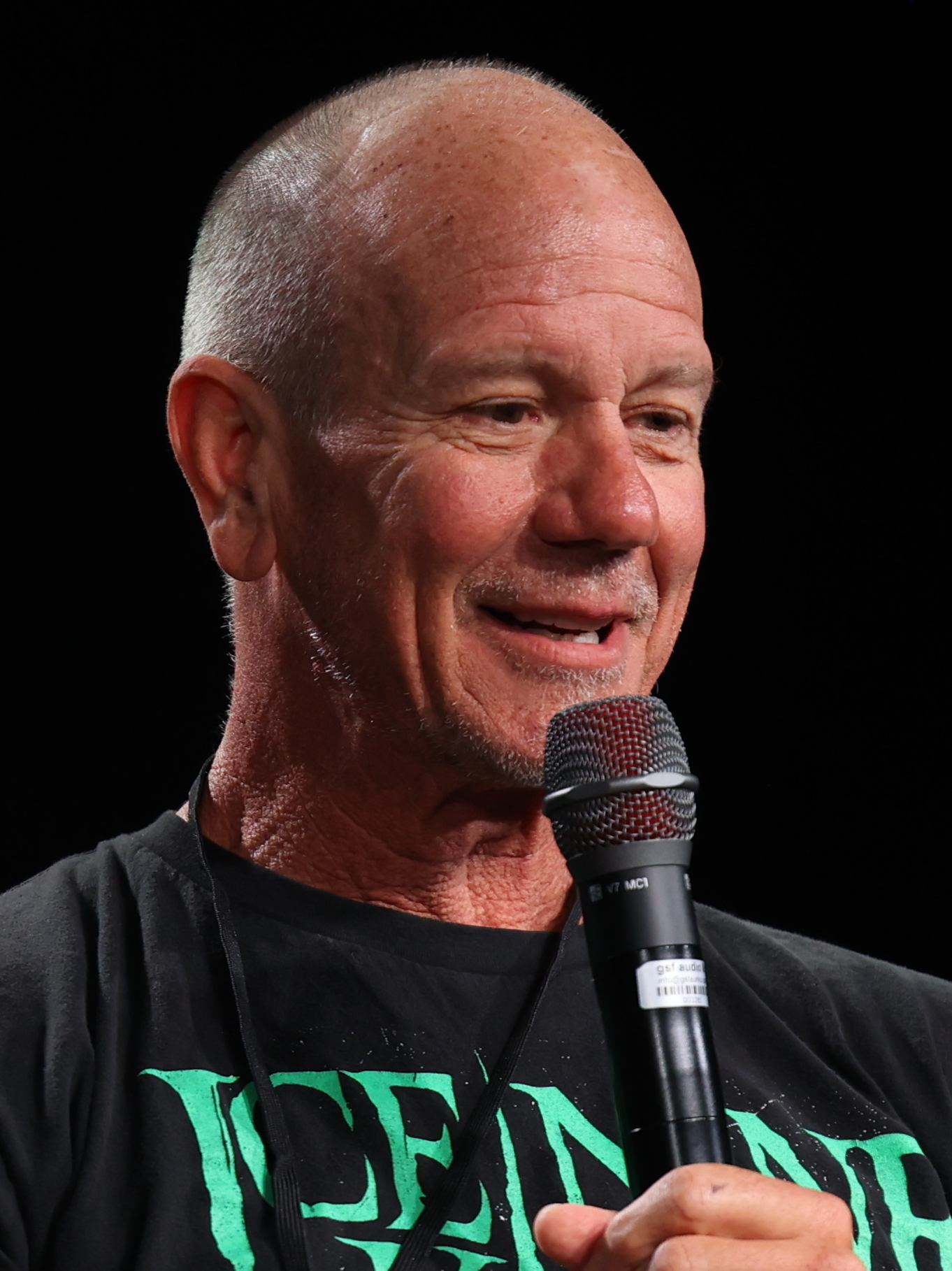
Robert Brian Wilson (pictured in 2024) was cast as Billy Chapman

Robert Brian Wilson, a first-time actor, was cast as the adult Billy Chapman after impressing Barmak and casting agent Stanzi Stokes. Lilyan Chauvin, a French actress and acting coach in Los Angeles, was cast in the role of the Mother Superior. Wilson later stated that Chauvin worked with him one-on-one rehearsing sequences in preparation for scenes.

=== Filming ===
Principal photography began on March 26, 1984, in Heber City and Midway, Utah, on a budget of approximately $750,000. Filming was completed on April 21, 1984.

The Ira's Toys building was a vacant former hardware store which was rented by the production. As of 2022, it still stands and operates as a gym. Because the film was shot in the late spring, there was a lack of natural snow in the region; to create the illusion of snowfall during some scenes, such as establishing shots of the toy store, the crew dispersed fake plastic snowflakes from the roof of the building.

== Release ==
=== Certification ===
Tri-Star Pictures initially submitted Silent Night, Deadly Night to the Motion Picture Association of America (MPAA) three times, resulting in three successive X rating certificates. After significant cuts were made to eliminate excessive violence and gore, the film was finally granted an R rating by the MPAA around November 2, 1984.

=== Marketing and controversy ===
Silent Night, Deadly Night drew significant controversy and spurred a moral panic in the United States over its advertising campaign, particularly its poster and television spots, which emphasized the film's murderous villain dressed as Santa Claus. One widely-circulated 30-second television advertisement showed the film's Santa Claus-suited villain breaking down a door with an axe and pulling a knife from his belt, with somber voiceover narration intoning: "The Night Before Christmas." The advertisement aired on daytime, afternoon, and early-evening television, including during a nationally-televised Green Bay Packers game, and swiftly led to parents complaining it caused their children to become terrified of Santa Claus. TriStar executives stated that they had requested the advertisement be aired only during late-night programming, though an employee of Diener-Hauser-Bates, the media agency who handled TriStar's marketing, denied this: "We weren't told any specific times. We buy time slots that deliver us the best target audience. Since men 18 to 34 traditionally are the ones who go to these movies, what better time to buy than during a football game?"

Kathleen Eberhardt, a housewife from Milwaukee, Wisconsin who had seen the advertisement, formed the group Citizens Against Movie Madness and coordinated a nationwide protest against the film. On the film's release day at the Interboro Theatre in The Bronx, New York City, protesters picketed the theater and sang Christmas carols in protest, while protests at multiple Brooklyn theaters drew hundreds of attendees. Additional protests took place in Milwaukee, while several theaters in Billings, Montana outright refused to exhibit the film. One protest organizer wrote: "The film portends something extremely violent, something terroristic about Christmas. It's an intrusion against something we hold sacred." When the film was castigated at length by Gene Siskel and Roger Ebert, the backlash against the film became louder and more widespread.

In response to the public outcry, TriStar Pictures retracted all advertisements for the film on November 8, 1984, the day before its theatrical release. Producer Ira Barmak, addressing the controversy, told People magazine: "People have taken offense at Santa being used in a scary context... Santa Claus is not a religious figure, he's a mythic character. I didn't deliberately ride roughshod over that sensitivity and I didn't anticipate the objection to it." Director Charles Sellier, a devout Christian himself, admitted that the film had ended up more violent than he had anticipated, but indicated he intended only "to make a B horror movie" and "never meant to anger or offend anyone." Commentating on the controversy, the East Moline Dispatch's Ken Tucker observed that the film "expresses the same facile psychology as the protests being lodged against it. The endlessly repeated message of Silent Night, Deadly Night is that if you watch violent acts, you are more likely to commit them yourself."

=== Theatrical ===
Silent Night, Deadly Night had a test screening at Los Angeles's Rosemead Theatre on September 21, 1984, which was well-received. Barmak stated: "Our audience was full of a 17 to 24-year-olds, our demographic target. People went crazy, they cheered, they howled, they laughed in all the right places. I think it was then that TriStar decided that there was an audience for this picture and that it would have to be booked carefully." TriStar Pictures proceeded to have 400 prints of the film made for distribution. The film was released theatrically on November 9, 1984, opening in 398 theaters in the midwest and northeast United States.

Following the mounting public backlash against the film, it was withdrawn from numerous theaters within the first two weeks of its release: By November 25, 1984, it had been pulled from multiple theaters in Milwaukee, as well as at several locations throughout New York City and New Jersey after public protests were held. It did, however, continue to screen longer in some cities, including Boston, where it ran theatrically for an uninterrupted four weeks and drew significant audience attendance.

Barmak subsequently purchased the rights to the film back from TriStar, and licensed it to the independent distributor Aquarius Films, who gave it a limited theatrical reissue on May 3, 1985. The advertising campaign designed by Aquarius eliminated the Santa Claus-themed promotional artwork, with posters that emphasized the film's controversy.

In November 2013, it was announced that Fangoria in association with Brainstorm Media and Screenvision would be re-releasing the film to theaters in the United States throughout December 2013.

=== Home media ===
Originally planned to be released on home media by RCA/Columbia Pictures Home Video (which was a joint venture between Columbia Pictures and RCA) in early 1985, the home media release was cancelled. The film was then originally released on VHS and Beta in May 1986 through USA Home Video. The film was released on Laserdisc in 1987 and reissued on VHS by International Video Entertainment in 1987 and 1988. In 1992, the film was last released on VHS for the last time by Avid Home Entertainment.

In 2003, the film was released on DVD as a double feature disc alongside the sequel Silent Night, Deadly Night Part 2 by Anchor Bay Entertainment. Starz/Anchor Bay issued a re-release of the DVD in December 2007. On December 4, 2012, Starz/Anchor Bay issued a third DVD release alongside Part 2 as a two-disc "Christmas Survival Double Feature". On September 16, 2014, Starz/Anchor Bay released the film for the first time on Blu-ray.

In the United Kingdom, the film was never submitted for certification to the BBFC, and its sequel was denied a video certificate in 1987 after the distributors refused to make the cuts required for an '18' certificate. However, in 2009, Arrow Films submitted the film to the BBFC for classification, who passed the film uncut with an 18 certificate. The Arrow Films DVD was released on November 23, 2009.

On December 5, 2017, Shout! Factory, under its Scream Factory label, released the film in a two-disc set collector's edition Blu-ray and DVD. It contains the film remastered in 4K resolution from the original negative sourced from the original R-rated theatrical cut, while the unrated version features SD inserts. It also contains new and archive special features. A limited edition deluxe offer from Scream Factory also included a collectible poster and 8 inches (20 cm) figure of Billy holding his double-bit axe, limited to 2,000 units. Scream Factory later issued the film on 4K UHD Blu-ray on December 10, 2024.

== Reception ==
=== Box office ===
On its opening weekend, the film finished in eighth place at the U.S. box office, grossing $1,432,800. It outgrossed Wes Craven's landmark slasher A Nightmare on Elm Street, which opened the same day (albeit in 235 fewer theaters).

During the weekend November 23, 1984, the film had a 45% drop in revenue from the previous weekend, earning $782,600 from 364 theaters, with an average of $2,150 per screen. The dip in box-office revenue coincided with TriStar's retraction of the film's television advertisements. By early-mid December 1984, the film had recorded a total box-office gross of $3,329,000.

=== Critical response ===
Silent Night, Deadly Night received mixed reviews from film critics at the time of its release. On the review aggregator website Rotten Tomatoes, 55% of 31 critics' reviews are positive. Metacritic, which uses a weighted average, assigned the film a score of 31 out of 100, based on 5 critics, indicating "generally unfavorable" reviews.

A significant amount of criticism launched at the film by critics and journalists centered on its violence and Santa Claus-clad villain: Siskel and Ebert condemned the film on their series At the Movies, with Siskel going as far as reading names of the film's production crew on air and likening the film's box-office revenue to "blood money". Roxanne T. Mueller, writing for The Plain Dealer, lambasted the film as "a sleazy, miserable, insulting, worthless, exploitative piece of garbage." Leonard Maltin also denounced it, calling it a "worthless splatter film" and asking, "What's next, the Easter Bunny as a child molester?" Fred Lutz of the Toledo Blade commented, "to call the film blasphemous would be an understatement. It's an absolute travesty."

Though describing the screenplay as "hollow," Mike Hughes of the Poughkeepsie Journal praised the film's technical elements, writing that director Sellier "has guided an adequate cast and overcome any budget woes." Kirk Ellis of The Hollywood Reporter similarly complimented director Sellier's "workmanlike competence" and praised the cinematography and Gilmer McCormack's performance as Sister Margaret. Jay Rath of The Capital Times favorably observed "plenty of levity" in the film's screenplay, noting its use of "sniggering double-entendres," but ultimately deemed it a "lackluster Christmas film" and summarized: "Silent Night, Deadly Night is not for children. It may not even be for human beings." The Baltimore Sun critic Stephen Hunter found the film's theme of children in jeopardy "reprehensible," but conceded that some audiences may find "something subliminally satisfying about seeing the old symbol of Christmas capitalism slandered with willful glee... Sellier manages to evoke the essential grotesqueness that lurks under the sugary ad-agency and greeting-card vision of Christmas. It's almost a Marxist critique of the High Orgy of Conspicuous Consumption."

Mike Muro of The Boston Globe deemed the story "standard issue" and described the murder sequences as occurring in "clinical succession. Thankfully there's not a lot of messy characterization to bloody the snow." Joe Butkiewicz of the Times Leader panned the film, describing it as "sort of a Dickens' A Christmas Carol where the nightmare runs diabolically amok... The horror doesn't work and the humor doesn't work." Keith Roydsen of the Muncie Evening Press criticized the film mainly for its technical elements, finding the performances lackluster and describing Sellier's direction as "inept." Michael Wilmington wrote in the Los Angeles Times: "[it's] safe to predict that Silent Night, Deadly Night... will start making 'Worst Movie of All Time' lists almost immediately".

=== Legacy ===
Silent Night, Deadly Night went on to become a cult film in the years following its initial release.

== Franchise ==
=== Sequels ===
Due to the minor success of the film, four sequels were produced. The first two, Silent Night, Deadly Night Part 2 and Silent Night, Deadly Night 3: Better Watch Out!, focus on Billy's younger brother Ricky becoming a serial killer. However, Silent Night, Deadly Night 4: Initiation and Silent Night, Deadly Night 5: The Toy Maker have no connection with the characters from the previous films, with each of them focusing on a different Christmas-themed horror story.

=== Remake ===
A loose remake of the film, titled Silent Night, was released on December 4, 2012, starring Jaime King and Malcolm McDowell.

On March 2, 2021, another remake was announced when Orwo Studios and Black Hanger Studios acquired the rights to the original film. The film has been shelved as of 2025.

The 2022 film Christmas Bloody Christmas began as a pitch for a remake of Silent Night, Deadly Night. The pitch was rejected for straying too far from the original, then was further developed into its own film.

=== Second remake ===
In November 2024, a second remake of the film was announced to be produced by Cineverse, written and directed by Mike P. Nelson. Rohan Campbell was cast as Billy in April 2025, and Ruby Modine later joined the cast. The film was released theatrically on December 12, 2025.

== See also ==
- Holiday horror
- List of cult films
- Silent Night, Bloody Night, a similar Christmas horror film about a home invasion during Christmas time
- Violent Night, another similar Christmas horror film

== Sources ==
- Beahm, Justin (2017). Slay Bells Ring: The Story of Silent Night, Deadly Night. Silent Night, Deadly Night (Blu-ray documentary short). Shout! Factory. OCLC 1015905714.
- DuPée, Matthew C. (2022). A Scary Little Christmas: A History of Yuletide Horror Films, 1972-2020. Jefferson, North Carolina: McFarland & Company. ISBN 978-1-476-64540-7.
- Maltin, Leonard (2008). Leonard Maltin's 2009 Movie Guide. New York City, New York: Plume. ISBN 978-0-452-28978-9.
- Muir, John Kenneth (2012). Horror Films of the 1980s. Vol. 1. Jefferson, North Carolina: McFarland & Company. ISBN 978-0-786-47298-7.
- Rockoff, Adam (2011). Going to Pieces: The Rise and Fall of the Slasher Film, 1978-1986. Jefferson, North Carolina: McFarland & Company. ISBN 978-0-78646-932-1.
- Schanie, Andrew (2010). Movie Confidential: Sex, Scandal, Murder and Mayhem in the Film Industry. New York City, New York: Clerisy Press. ISBN 978-1-578-60477-7.
