= December to Dismember =

Professional wrestling event

- Promotions: Extreme Championship Wrestling (1995); World Wrestling Entertainment (2006)
- Brands: ECW (2006)
- First event: 1995
- Last event: 2006

December to Dismember was a professional wrestling event. It was first held by the former Extreme Championship Wrestling promotion in 1995 as a non-televised supercard. After World Wrestling Entertainment (WWE) acquired the assets of the former promotion in 2003, December to Dismember was revived as a pay-per-view (PPV) event in 2006 and was promoted by WWE for its new ECW brand division. An event was planned for 2007, but was canceled as WWE discontinued brand-exclusive PPVs following WrestleMania 23 in April 2007, resulting in the reduction of yearly PPVs produced.

== History ==
In 1995, Extreme Championship Wrestling held an event titled December to Dismember on December 9 at the ECW Arena in Philadelphia, Pennsylvania. This inaugural event was a non-televised supercard. This would be the only December to Dismember event held by the Extreme Championship Wrestling promotion as in 2001, the promotion was closed down due to financial issues.

In 2003, World Wrestling Entertainment (WWE) acquired the assets of Extreme Championship Wrestling. In May 2006, WWE launched a third brand dubbed ECW in which alumni of the defunct promotion, as well as newer talent, would compete—brands were a subdivision of WWE's roster where wrestlers exclusively performed; WWE's other two brands at this time were Raw and SmackDown!. WWE then revived December to Dismember as a pay-per-view (PPV) for their ECW brand, and it was scheduled to be held on December 3, 2006, at the James Brown Arena in Augusta, Georgia. This was the only ECW branded pay-per-view WWE produced before the decision was made to discontinue brand-exclusive PPVs following WrestleMania 23 in April 2007, which resulted in WWE reducing the amount of yearly PPVs produced. Before the change, an event for 2007 had been planned.

== Dates and venues ==
#	Event	Date	City	Venue	Main event	Ref.
Extreme Championship Wrestling
1	December to Dismember (1995)	December 9, 1995	Philadelphia, Pennsylvania	ECW Arena	The Public Enemy, The Pitbulls, and Tommy Dreamer vs. The Heavenly Bodies, The Eliminators, Raven, and Stevie Richards in an Ultimate Jeopardy Steel Cage match	
World Wrestling Entertainment: ECW
2	December to Dismember (2006)	December 3, 2006	Augusta, Georgia	James Brown Arena	Big Show (c) vs. Bobby Lashley vs. Rob Van Dam vs. CM Punk vs. Hardcore Holly vs. Test in an Extreme Elimination Chamber match for the ECW World Championship	
(c) – refers to the champion(s) heading into the match

== See also ==
- List of ECW supercards and pay-per-view events
- List of WWE pay-per-view events
