= Nancy Borgenicht =

American actress

- Education: B.A. Princeton University
- Occupation: Actress
- Years active: 1984–1992
- Spouse: Louis Borgenicht
- Children: 2

Nancy Borgenicht is an actress who starred in film and on television. She is best known for her role as Mrs. Randall in the 1984 horror movie Silent Night, Deadly Night. She also appeared in Halloween 4: The Return of Michael Myers (1988) as the woman attendant. Her other film roles include Tripwire (1989) and Neon City (1992). Nancy starred in the short lived 1990 television series Teen Angel Returns as Mrs. Henderson. She has appeared in some television movies like the 1986 TV movie The Deliberate Stranger (1986).

== Biography ==
Borgenicht was raised in a Jewish family, the daughter of Helen (née Frank) and A. Wally Sandack. She graduated from Rowland Hall in Salt Lake City, Utah and Princeton University in 1963. In 1974, she joined The Salt Lake Acting Company where she served as Co-Executive Producer with Allen Nevins from 1993-2005 and as Interim Executive Producer for the 2009-2010 season. In 1978, she co-founded the annual Salt Lake City production, Saturday's Voyeur, a parody of Utah politics and culture; and has served as a co-writer since its inception.

She was married to Dr. Louis Borgenicht; they had two sons: David Borgenicht and Joe Borgenicht.

== Filmography ==
Year	Title	Role	Notes
1984	Silent Night, Deadly Night	Mrs. Helen Randall	
1984	Solo	Girl Mechanic	
1988	Halloween 4: The Return of Michael Myers	Woman Attendant	
1989	Teen Angel	Mrs. Henderson	
1989	Tripwire	Pitt's Secretary	
1992	Neon City	Aria	
