= Teen Angel (1989 TV series) =

- Genre: Fantasy serial drama
- Created by: The Walt Disney Company
- Written by: Kris Young
- Directed by: Max Reid
- Starring: Jason Priestley
- Country of origin: United States
- Original language: English
- No. of seasons: 1
- No. of episodes: 12

Production
- Producer: William Shippey
- Running time: 45–48 minutes
- Production company: The Disney Channel

Original release
- Release: April 24 – May 22, 1989

Related
- Teen Angel Returns; The All-New Mickey Mouse Club

Teen Angel is an American teen fantasy drama television series that aired on The Disney Channel. Starring Jason Priestley, the series was first broadcast on The All-New Mickey Mouse Club (MMC) on April 24, 1989, and ended its run on May 22, 1989.

== Synopsis ==
Priestley stars as a 1950s teenage guardian angel named Buzz Gunderson who was killed in a car wreck in 1959. Buzz was given various assignments and tasks he was to complete in order to get into heaven.

== Sequel: Teen Angel Returns ==
Teen Angel was followed by a sequel series, Teen Angel Returns, also starring Priestley and future Beverly Hills, 90210 co-star Jennie Garth, which aired from October 2 to October 22, 1989. The theme for both series was from the recording by Mark Dinning. Parts of the series were filmed in Salt Lake City, Utah, Bountiful High School Gym (Utah), and Ogden, Utah.

== Cast ==
- Jason Priestley as Buzz Gunderson
- Adam Biesk as Dennis Mullen
- Nancy Borgenicht as Mrs. Henderson
- Hunter Mackenzie Austin as Carolyn
- Renee O'Connor as Nancy Nichols
- Sasha Jenson as Jason

== See also ==
- Teen Angel (1997 TV series) – a comedic take on a similar plot, aired on ABC
- Out of the Blue – one of many spin-off sitcoms connected to the sitcom Happy Days
- The Heavenly Kid
