= Street Soldiers =

- Directed by: Lee Harry
- Written by: Jun Chong; Lee Harry; Spencer Grendahl
- Produced by: Jun Chong; Eric A. Gage; D.S. Kim
- Starring: Jun Chong; Jeff Rector; David Homb; Jonathan Gorman; Hwang Jang-lee
- Cinematography: Dennis Peters
- Edited by: George Copanas; Lee Harry
- Music by: David Bergeaud
- Distributed by: Curb Esquire Films; Academy Entertainment (home video)
- Release date: May 16, 1991; (home video)
- Running time: 99 minutes
- Country: United States
- Language: English

Street Soldiers is a 1991 American revenge martial arts film written, produced, and starring taekwondo master Jun Chong, and directed by Lee Harry. The film would be the only production to feature actor Hwang Jang-lee, who is credited in the film as "Jason Hwang".

== Plot ==
A truce between two rival gangs, the Tigers and the JPs, come to an end when after a day at school, the Tigers are attacked by members of the JPs, led by Spider. When Tigers leader Max warns Spider about the truce, Spider informs Max it is his gang and they want the streets back. Max gets help in Charlie, who is a martial arts expert but in the melee, Tigers member Spud is stabbed by Spider. Later that day, the JP leader Priest has been released from prison alongside Tok, a mute prisoner who saved Priest and has become his most trusted companion. Upon returning to the hangout, Priest has learned that Spider had broken the truce. Angry, Priest and Spider settle the score with Priest winning and regaining full leadership of the gang.

Meanwhile, reeling from the loss of Spud, Max finds it hard to work at the local warehouse. He is good friends with the manager, Troy, who tries to help him cope with his problem. Max tells Troy of an upcoming school dance and wants to introduce him to his girlfriend's friend. Max's girlfriend, Marie, works at a clothing store with Julie. Marie invites Julie to the dance perhaps in an effort to introduce her to Troy. That night at the dance, Charlie and Troy meet when they both ask Julie to dance. However, the celebration is interrupted by the arrivals of the JPs. When Julie sees Priest, she is in complete shock as it is revealed that Priest is Julie's ex-boyfriend, who plans to get her back at any cost. A fight breaks out and Charlie attempts to help, but is outmatched by Tok, who is a master martial artist himself. Troy and Charlie soon become friends and Charlie decides that Troy may have the potential to be able to defend himself.

As the war between the Tigers and JPs continue, Charlie introduces Troy to his uncle and martial arts teacher, Han. Han trains Troy and Charlie in taekwondo for self-defense means. During a day out, Max, Charlie, and Troy are chased down by the JPs. Nearly outrun and out manned, the trio jump off a bridge and land on a freight truck, angering the JPs. Priest declares war and again, intends to get Julie back. After an incident at the clothing store, Julie finds solace in Troy while again, Charlie finds himself outmatched by Tok. Julie begins a relationship with Troy and reveals that her ex-boyfriend Victor Sandoval was extremely violent and ended up in prison. She reveals to Troy that Priest is Victor Sandoval. When the Tigers prove to be no match for the JPs, the Tigers turn to Han to train them to defend themselves and bring peace to the streets. Han agrees that the Tigers have good intentions and decides to train them.

One night, Marie is kidnapped by Priest, who leads a gang rape on her. Meanwhile, after a night of training, Charlie is cleaning up the martial arts school when Tok arrives and kills Charlie. At the funeral, Troy and Han agree that the JPs must be stopped once and for all. To make matters worse, Priest has kidnapped Julie and has taken her to an abandoned warehouse site. Armed with martial arts and weapons, the war rages between the JPs and the Tigers. Troy goes after Priest while Han fights Tok to avenge Charlie. Meanwhile, members of the JPs and Tigers are all being killed. Spider and Max gun each other down in the fray, to the horror of Marie. Han is able to kill Tok while Troy finally knocks out Priest and gets Julie out. When Priest awakens and is about to unleash an attack with an axe on Han, Troy, and Julie, Marie shoots and kills Priest using a shotgun. The war finally ends despite many casualties and the streets are once again safe.

== Cast ==
- Jun Chong as Master Han
- Jeff Rector as Victor "Priest" Sandoval
- David Homb as Troy
- Jonathan Gorman as Max
- Katherine Armstrong as Julie
- Joon B. Kim as Charlie
- Jude Gerard Prest as Spider
- Hwang Jang-lee as Tok
- Jay Richardson as Wheelchair Willie
- Deborah Newmark as Marie

== Production ==
The film was shot on location in Los Angeles in 1990. This would be the final film for Chong's Action Brothers Productions for a decade and a half, until Chong produced and co-starred in Maximum Cage Fighting sixteen years later in 2006. Korean-born actor Hwang Jang-lee was featured in his only full-American production. Chong choreographed the film's martial arts scenes with Kim Kahana Sr. serving as stunt coordinator. The film did not receive a theatrical release in the United States.

== Home media ==
It was released on VHS from Academy Entertainment on May 16, 1991. As of August 2019, the film has not received a DVD or Blu-ray release.

== Reception ==
Reviewers Mick Martin and Marsha Porter described the film as:

Better-than-average revenge flick has a group of high school students banding together to take out the hoodlums who killed one of their ranks. Slick production values and fast-paced action sequences add up to a rousing tale.
