= Lee Harry =

American film director and editor

Lee Harry is an American film director and editor, best known for directing the Christmas slasher film Silent Night, Deadly Night Part 2 and Street Soldiers. Along with fellow Burbank editor Joseph H. Earle, Harry was tasked to use his editing skills to make Silent Night, Deadly Night Part 2 look like a different film than the original, which would then be repackaged as a sequel. It has since become a cult classic. Harry admits to being pleased by the reception the notoriously inept film has received.

He has done motion picture advertising trailers for Carroll & Co, Seiniger Advertising, Cimarron-Bacon-O’Brien, Vision Advertising, Kaleidoscope Films, and Buddha Jones.

His dramatic short film The Whistler was nominated at the Burbank International Film Festival (2015).

Harry received a Student Academy Award for his work on Button, Button in 1978. The film was screened by director Steven Spielberg.

His other accolades include a Hollywood Reporter 2008 Movie Marketing Key Art Award, for his AV work on No Country For Old Men.

He is a graduate of the University of Bridgeport.
