= Neon City =

- Directed by: Monte Markham
- Written by: Ann Lewis Hamilton (as Buck Finch); Jeff Begun; Monte Markham
- Produced by: Wolf Schmidt
- Starring: Michael Ironside; Vanity; Lyle Alzado; Valerie Wildman; Nick Klar; Juliet Landau; Arsenio Trinidad; Richard Sanders
- Cinematography: Keith Holland
- Edited by: David Hagar
- Music by: Stephen Graziano
- Production companies: Little Bear Films; Kodiak Films
- Distributed by: Trimark Pictures
- Release date: December 16, 1991 (United States)
- Running time: 99 minutes
- Country: Canada
- Language: English

Neon City (also known as Anno 2053 in Italy, Neonski Grad in Serbia) is a 1991 Canadian post-apocalyptic science fiction film directed by Monte Markham and written by Jeff Begun and Ann Lewis Hamilton, under the pseudonym Buck Finch. The cast includes Michael Ironside, Vanity, Lyle Alzado, Valerie Wildman, Nick Klar, Juliet Landau, Richard Sanders and Markham.

== Plot ==
In the 2050s, extensive ecological damage has resulted in largely lawless areas that are controlled by mutant raiders. Harry Stark, an ex-cop who now works as a bounty hunter in the wastelands, saves a woman from mutant outlaws. After she pulls a knife on him, he knocks her unconscious and brings her back to town for her bounty. Captain Raymond, Stark's former commanding officer, tells him that the woman, Reno, must be brought to Neon City to collect his payment. Raymond requests that Stark ride shotgun on a transport that is going to Neon City, but he refuses. When Stark's truck blows up, Raymond claims it to be an act of terrorism by mutants. Stark attacks Raymond, only to be knocked unconscious and placed on the transport with Reno.

On board the transport are Bulk, a former friend and ex-cop whom Stark once arrested; Tom, a serial killer who pretends to be a doctor; Dickie Devine, a clown; Sandy, Stark's ex-wife; Twink, the sheltered daughter of an influential Neon City politician; and Wing, an old man who keeps to himself. Before they leave, Raymond gives them the opportunity to receive a refund and stay behind, as mutant activity along the road has been excessive; all elect to go instead of staying and collecting a refund. Along the way, they pass through a deadly Xander Cloud, and, when they stop afterward, they meet a family who is suffering from extensive radiation damage. Stark buys a euthanasia kit from Devine and donates it to the grateful family. Disgusted, Reno calls Devine and Stark no better than herself.

When they reach their first destination, an outpost where they are to meet with an escort, mutant raiders have killed almost everyone. The sole survivor, Bulk's sister, is entrusted to Tom, who pretends to aid her until the others leave him alone, after which he murders her. Reno saves Twink's life and flees the site on a motorcycle, but Stark recovers her. Stark proposes that they continue without the escort and surprises Reno when he gives her a vote. She sides with the majority, and they push on. Their next stop is at a restaurant staffed by mutants. Twink is surprised when the others treat the mutant staffers as equals. While on the road, mutant raiders attack, and Devine is wounded. They jettison some of their cargo to escape. After they barely survive a "bright", an intense temperature change, Tom murders Devine.

After burying Devine, the transport encounters a shelter, where they rest and recuperate. Tom tries to force himself on Reno, but she beats him; Tom claims she could not handle his rejection. Reno and Stark bond as he consoles her, and she reveals that she killed her foster parents accidentally when fleeing from their child prostitution ring. After they have sex, Reno asks Stark to run away with her, but he refuses to leave the others. After discussing the world's ecological damage with Wing, Bulk realizes that Wing is actually Dr. Xander, the scientist responsible for much of the damage. Xander explains that he was attempting to solve the world's problems, and, if he reached a proper laboratory, he might be able to reverse the effects. Bulk promises not to turn him in, and they return to their journey.

During the next mutant raid, they run out of ammunition. Xander improvises a laser weapon that saves them, but not before Sandy is shot and the transport finally dies. Xander elects to leave for the border, and the rest walk to Neon City, which is nearby. Tom gives Sandy a dose of painkillers. When they arrive at Neon City, Twink expedites their entry and smooths things over between Stark and the local police, who are commanded by Jenkins, a man with a grudge against Stark. When Sandy dies of a massive drug overdose, Tom is finally exposed. He takes Reno hostage, but Stark kills him. This results in a standoff between Stark and Jenkins; Reno calms Stark, and they leave together. When Jenkins asks about his prisoner, Stark says she died during transport. As they leave Neon City, Stark and Reno pick up Xander.

== Cast ==
- Michael Ironside as Harry M. Stark
- Vanity as Reno
- Lyle Alzado as Bulk
- Nick Klar as Dr. Tom
- Richard Sanders as Dickie Devine
- Valerie Wildman as Sandy Randall
- Juliet Landau as Twink Talaman
- Arsenio Trinidad as Wing
- Monte Markham as Captain Raymond
- Nancy Borgenicht as Aria
- Jesse Bennett as Captain Jenkins

== Production ==
Television writer Ann Lewis Hamilton wrote the script for Neon City as an update to John Ford's Stagecoach, set in a post-apocalyptic world inspired by Mad Max. Having had difficulty with sexism in the past, she used a masculine pseudonym, Buck Finch, to sell the script. The protagonist was originally a woman, but the producers cast Ironside as the lead. Shooting took place in Salt Lake County, Utah. Principal photography ended in March 1991.

== Reception ==
Reviews compared it to Stagecoach. TV Guide rated it 2/4 stars and wrote, "Neon City is far from the worst Road Warrior rerun ever, although that's truly faint praise."
