= Young Actors Space =

Young Actors Space (YAS) was established in 1979 by Diane Hill Hardin and Nora Eckstein in Los Angeles. This team was the first in the entertainment industry to establish a performing arts academy for young, working and aspiring actors. It is well known for being one of the best acting schools for youth in Los Angeles. Patrick Day took over the school in 2007 with his associate Gilmer McCormick.

== Former and current instructors ==
- Diane Hill Hardin
- Nora Eckstein
- Patrick Day, Owner
- Gilmer McCormick
- Angela Campolla
- Bruce Ducat
- Natalie Halloran
- Maura Corsini
- Jule Nelson-Duac
- Elise Tullius
- Scott Alan Moffitt, Dialect Coach.
