= December to Dismember (1995) =

Extreme Championship Wrestling supercard event

- Promotion: Extreme Championship Wrestling
- Date: December 9, 1995 (aired December 12 and 19, 1995)
- City: Philadelphia, Pennsylvania
- Venue: ECW Arena
- Attendance: 1,000
- Tagline: Ultimate Jeopardy

Event chronology
← Previous; November to Remember	Next → Holiday Hell

December to Dismember chronology
← Previous; First	Next → 2006

The 1995 December to Dismember was a professional wrestling event produced by Extreme Championship Wrestling (ECW). It took place on December 9, 1995, at the ECW Arena in Philadelphia, Pennsylvania as a non-televised supercard. Though this event was held only once by ECW, the "December to Dismember" name would later be revived as a 2006 pay-per-view (PPV) event produced by World Wrestling Entertainment (WWE) for their ECW brand.

One half of the double main event was an Ultimate Jeopardy steel cage match as the Public Enemy, the Pitbulls and Tommy Dreamer faced the Heavenly Bodies, the Eliminators, Raven and Stevie Richards. The Public Enemy, the Pitbulls and Tommy Dreamer won the contest after Dreamer pinned Richards. The other main event match on the card was a three way dance for the ECW World Heavyweight Championship between champion Mikey Whipwreck, the Sandman, and Steve Austin, which was won by the Sandman.

Excerpts from December to Dismember appeared on episodes #138 and #139 of ECW Hardcore TV on December 12 and 19, 1995. The three way dance for the ECW World Heavyweight Championship was featured in the 2007 DVD The Legacy of Stone Cold Steve Austin, while the Ultimate Jeopardy steel cage match was featured in the 2013 Blu-ray WCW War Games: WCW's Most Notorious Matches as a Blu-ray exclusive.

== Production ==
=== Background ===
In 1995, Extreme Championship Wrestling (ECW) scheduled an event titled December to Dismember. It was a non-televised supercard that was scheduled to be held on December 9, 1995, at the ECW Arena in Philadelphia, Pennsylvania.

=== Storylines ===
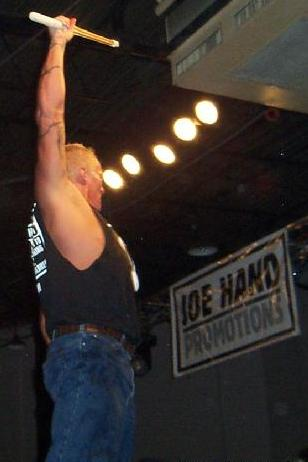
The Sandman, who was in the three way dance bout for the ECW World Heavyweight Championship at December to Dismember.

The main feud heading into the event was between the Sandman, Mikey Whipwreck and Steve Austin with the three feuding over the ECW World Heavyweight Championship. Whipwreck was the champion heading into the event. A match was booked between Whipwreck and the Sandman for the title on October 28, 1995. However, moments before the match began, Steve Austin appeared and cut a promo on Whipwreck, the Sandman and Woman, who was Sandman's manager. He stated that he would soon be ECW World Heavyweight Champion. He distracted the Sandman by taking Woman backstage during the bout. Whipwreck won the title by pinning the Sandman. Many ECW wrestlers congratulated Whipwreck after the contest including Cactus Jack and Axl Rotten. The Sandman earned a rematch clause on November 4, but lost his rematch against Whipwreck. At November to Remember, Whipwreck was scheduled to face The Sandman, but before the match, Austin attacked the Sandman, hitting him repeatedly with the cane. As a result, the match was changed to Whipwreck versus Austin, marking Austin's ECW in-ring debut. Austin would lose against Whipwreck, as Whipwreck pinned Austin, grabbing the tights after a sunset flip. After the bout, Austin, enraged about the loss, viciously attacked Whipwreck. This led to the three way dance for December to Dismember.

The undercard feud heading into December to Dismember was between two tag teams, as the Public Enemy (Rocco Rock and Johnny Grunge), the Pitbulls (#1 and #2) and Tommy Dreamer were in a rivalry against the Heavenly Bodies (Tom Prichard and Jimmy Del Ray), the Eliminators (Perry Saturn and John Kronus), Raven and Stevie Richards. Many of the members would face off in singles and tag team matches against each other in the undercard, with the team getting at least two out of three victories gaining the entry advantage in the Ultimate Jeopardy match, in lieu of the traditional coin toss.

On October 28, 1995, Grunge had faced Richards, with a pre-match stipulation stating that the loser would have to wear a dress. Grunge won, meaning Richards was forced to wear the dress. Grunge would team up with partner Rocco Rock to form the Public Enemy, as they defeated Richards and Raven on November 3. The following night, Grunge's team would keep the advantage, as partners the Pitbulls and Tommy Dreamer defeated Cactus Jack, Raven and Richards in a Six-Man Tag Team match. In a preview for December to Dismember, the Pitbulls faced the Eliminators at November to Remember. The Pitbulls would go on to win the match after Kronus was pinned. The Eliminators got their revenge on November 25, winning in their return match against The Pitbulls. Raven would also face Tommy Dreamer on November 25, but in a Death Match, which Raven won. This eventually led to the Ultimate Jeopardy Steel Cage match at December to Dismember.

== Event ==
The opening bout was a tag team match pitting the Dudley Brothers against the Bad Crew. The Dudley Brothers defeated The Bad Crew in a squash.

The second bout was a singles match between El Puerto Riqueño and Taz. Taz won the bout after making El Puerto Riqueño submit using the Tazmission.

The third bout was a single match between Bruiser Mastino and Hack Meyers. Meyers won the match by pinfall in just over six minutes.

The fourth bout was a tag team match pitting the Eliminators against the Pitbulls in a rematch from November to Remember. This was the first of three matches that would determine the advantage in the main event. The Eliminators won the match by pinning Pitbull #2.

The fifth bout was a singles match between Raven and Tommy Dreamer in a continuation of their lengthy feud. This was the second of three matches that would determine the advantage in the main event. Raven won in approximately nine minutes by technical knockout after hitting Dreamer with a beer bottle. As Raven and the Eliminators had each won their matches, their team were granted the advantage in the main event.

The sixth bout was a singles match in which J.T. Smith defeated Tony Stetson by pinfall.

The seventh bout saw ECW World Heavyweight Champion Mikey Whipwreck defended his title against the Sandman and Steve Austin in a three way dance. Whipwreck was the first person eliminated from the match, with Austin pinning him just inside 13 minutes following a Stun Gun, meaning Whipwreck would not leave as champion. The Sandman then pinned Austin after punching him using brass knuckles to win the match and the ECW World Heavyweight Championship. The Sandman suffered a broken hand during the match.

The eighth bout was a tag team match between the Heavenly Bodies and the Public Enemy. This was the third of three matches that would determine the advantage in the main event. The Public Enemy won the match when Johnny Grunge pinned Tom Prichard using a roll-up; however, as the Eliminators and Raven had won their matches, this did not affect the main event.

The main event was an "Ultimate Jeopardy" steel cage match pitting Tommy Dreamer, the Pitbulls, and the Public Enemy against Raven, Stevie Richards, the Eliminators, and the Heavenly Bodies. Each participant had a stipulation which would be implemented if they were defeated:

- Raven – whoever defeated him would get his valet, Beulah McGillicutty for a week;
- Tommy Dreamer – his head would be shaved;
- The Public Enemy – they would be forced to wrestle one another;
- The Pitbulls – they would be forced to split up and whoever defeated them would get their valet, Francine for a week;
- The Eliminators – they would be forced to leave ECW and their manager, Jason, would have his head shaved;
- Stevie Richards – he would be locked in the cage for five minutes with the members of the other team;
- The Heavenly Bodies – all stipulations for their team would be enforced.

Raven's team began the match with the advantage. During the match, Raven handcuffed both the Pitbulls and the Public Enemy to the ring apron, leaving Dreamer alone. However, Dreamer was able to rally and pin Richards. As a result of the stipulation, Richards was locked in the cage alone with the members of the opposing team for five minutes. However, as the Pitbulls and the Public Enemy remained handcuffed, Richards was one-on-one with the injured Dreamer. After Dreamer began to beat down Richards, Raven and his allies re-entered the cage and attacked Dreamer. Raven and his allies then attacked Dreamer and his team until the Sandman came to the ring with his Singapore cane and drove them away.

== Aftermath ==
The Sandman kept the ECW World Heavyweight Championship until he lost it to Raven on January 27, 1996. On December 18, Steve Austin made his debut in the World Wrestling Federation. Although he originally played a character known as the Ringmaster, he soon got a strong push as "Stone Cold" Steve Austin. Whipwreck did not hold the ECW World Heavyweight Championship again, but he won the ECW World Television Championship and the ECW World Tag Team Championship later in the month.

The Public Enemy soon left ECW; the company's big January event at the ECW Arena, House Party, was subtitled "A Farewell to Public Enemy".

Raven and Tommy Dreamer continued their feud for another year-and-a-half, culminating in a loser leaves town match at Wrestlepalooza 1997 that was won by Dreamer.

Although December to Dismember was held only once by Extreme Championship Wrestling, the "December to Dismember" name would later be revived as a 2006 pay-per-view (PPV) event produced by World Wrestling Entertainment (WWE) for their ECW brand. After Extreme Championship Wrestling folded in 2001, WWE bought the assets of the promotion in 2003 and launched a brand dubbed ECW in 2006, which featured alumni of the former promotion as well as newer talent.

== Results ==
No.	Results	Stipulations	Times
1	The Dudley Brothers (Buh Buh Ray Dudley and Dances with Dudley) (with Big Dick Dudley, Chubby Dudley, and Sign Guy Dudley) defeated the Bad Crew (Dog and Rose) (with Damien Kane and Lady Alexandra)	Tag team match	02:00
2	Taz (with Bill Alfonso) defeated El Puerto Riqueño by submission	Singles match	03:26
3	Hack Meyers defeated Bruiser Mastino by pinfall	Singles match	06:15
4	The Eliminators (Saturn and Kronus) (with Jason) defeated the Pitbulls (Pitbull #1 and Pitbull #2) (with Francine) by pinfall	Tag team match	09:30
5	Raven (with Beulah McGillicutty) defeated Tommy Dreamer by technical knockout	Singles match	08:45
6	J.T. Smith defeated Tony Stetson by pinfall	Singles match	05:04
7	The Sandman (with Woman) defeated Mikey Whipwreck (c) and Steve Austin by pinfall	Three way dance for the ECW World Heavyweight Championship	19:45
8	The Public Enemy (Johnny Grunge and Rocco Rock) defeated the Heavenly Bodies (Jimmy Del Ray and Tom Prichard) by pinfall	Tag team match	08:46
9	Tommy Dreamer, The Public Enemy (Johnny Grunge and Rocco Rock) and the Pitbulls (Pitbull #1 and Pitbulll #2) defeated Raven, the Heavenly Bodies (Jimmy Del Ray and Tom Prichard), the Eliminators (Saturn and Kronus) and Stevie Richards by pinfall	Ultimate Jeopardy steel cage match	21:00
(c) / – the champion(s) heading into the match
