= Saturday's Voyeur =

A scene from the 2007 season satirizes the then-recent renaming of the Utah Jazz's Basketball Arena after a nuclear waste disposal company.

Saturday's Voyeur is an annual musical satire formerly produced by Salt Lake Acting Company (SLAC) in Salt Lake City, Utah, United States. Each year a new show is written to parody contemporary life, politics, and religion in Utah. Saturday's Voyeur was created in 1978 by Michael Buttars & Nancy Borgenicht. In 1990, Allen Nevins joined the team writing team, and continued to co-write the show each year with Borgenicht. The pair opted to take Saturday's Voyeur from Salt Lake Acting Company in 1992 and 1993, but then returned to Salt Lake Acting Company the following year, where it remained until 2019.

The name Saturday's Voyeur is itself a parody of the production Saturday's Warrior, by Lex de Azevedo. With the Church of Jesus Christ of Latter-day Saints being prevalent in Utah culture it often becomes a dominant topic in the annual production. Poking fun at the doctrine, customs, and church figures of the religion through musical satire is used as comic relief for church members and non-members alike.

In July 2020, Salt Lake Acting Company announced it would no longer produce Saturday's Voyeur. Borgenicht and Nevins retain the rights to the property.
