= Rohan Campbell =

Canadian actor

- Campbell in 2026
- Born: 23 September 1997 (age 29); Calgary, Alberta, Canada
- Occupation: Actor
- Years active: 2008–present
- Known for: Frank Hardy in The Hardy Boys; Corey Cunningham in Halloween Ends; Billy Chapman in Silent Night, Deadly Night

Rohan Campbell (born 23 September 1997) is a Canadian actor. He is known for starring as Frank Hardy on the 2020 series adaptation The Hardy Boys, opposite Alexander Elliot as Joe Hardy, Corey Cunningham in the 2022 slasher film Halloween Ends, and Billy Chapman in Silent Night, Deadly Night.

Campbell was born in Calgary, and raised in Cochrane, Alberta. His parents are British immigrants. He has also appeared in the television productions Mayerthorpe and Klondike, and on the series Mech-X4, The 100, and iZombie. He moved to Vancouver at seventeen.

== Filmography ==
=== Film ===
Year	Title	Role	Notes
2013	The Right Kind of Wrong	Tyler	
2014	The Valley Below	Ben	
2015	Diablo	Robert	
2016	A Miracle on Christmas Lake	Evan	
2017	Crash Pad	High school jock	
2018	Boundaries	Mikey	
2018	The Professor	Male student #4	
2020	Operation Christmas Drop	Travis	
2021	Broken Diamonds	Ice cream scooper	
2022	Halloween Ends	Corey Cunningham	
2025	The Monkey	Ricky	
2025	Silent Night, Deadly Night	Billy Chapman	
2025	Violence	Henry Violence	
2027	Alone at Dawn †	TBA	Post-production

=== Television ===
Year	Title	Role	Notes
2008	Mayerthorpe	Tyler Stanton	Television film
2009	Santa Baby 2: Christmas Maybe	Young Luke	Television film
2014	Klondike	First mate	2 episodes
2015	Young Drunk Punk	Fanboy	Episode: "Rock of Seagulls"
2015	The Unauthorized Full House Story	Male student	Television film
2015	The Reckoning	Willie	Television film
2015	Dashing Through the Snow	Justin	Television film
2016–2018	Mech-X4	Dane	10 episodes
2017	Once Upon a Time	Male miner	Episode: "Mother's Little Helper"
2018	Supernatural	Packmate	Episode: "The Spear"
2019	Unspeakable	Eric Doncaster	2 episodes
2019	Valley of the Boom	Jeremy	Episode: "Part 3: agile method"
2019	Project Blue Book	Rourke	Episode: "The Green Fireballs"
2019	iZombie	Murphy	2 episodes
2019	The 100	Dave	2 episodes
2019–present	Virgin River	Lonergan	4 episodes
2020	Sacred Lies	Landon	2 episodes
2020	Snowpiercer	Junior Butcher	Episode: "Prepare to Brace"
2020–2023	The Hardy Boys	Frank Hardy	Main role 31 episodes
2026	Below	Jay Penney	Main role 6 episodes

=== Music videos ===
Year	Title	Artist	Role
2024	"Taste"	Sabrina Carpenter	Beloved Boyfriend
