= Billy Chapman (character) =

Silent Night, Deadly Night character

- Silent Night, Deadly Night character
- Billy Chapman (portrayed by Robert Brian Wilson)
- Created by: Paul Caimi; Michael Hickey
- Portrayed by: Robert Brian Wilson (1984 film); Danny Wagner (age 8) (1984 film); Jonathan Best (age 5) (1984 film); Rohan Campbell (2025 film, remake); Logan Sawyer (young, remake); Kowen Cadorath (teenager, remake)

In-universe information
- Full name: William Chapman
- Gender: Male
- Occupation: Toy store employee
- Family: Jim Chapman (father, deceased); Ellie Chapman (mother, deceased); Ricky Caldwell (brother, deceased)
- Relatives: Unnamed grandfather
- Nationality: American

William Chapman is a fictional character in the Silent Night, Deadly Night franchise. Created by writers Paul Caimi and Michael Hickey, the character serves as the protagonist and antivillain of the first film, Silent Night, Deadly Night (1984), and is featured in flashbacks in the sequel, Silent Night, Deadly Night Part 2 (1987).

In the first film, Billy is first introduced at age five, when he witnesses his parents' murder on a country road on Christmas Eve by a hitchhiker in a Santa Claus costume. The event leaves him with a pathological aversion to Christmas. Billy is placed in an orphanage under Mother Superior, and experiences abuse there throughout his childhood that compounds his mental state. At age eighteen, Billy acquires a job working at Ira's Toy Store; however, as Christmas arrives, he finds himself under increasing psychological duress, and eventually murders his co-workers at an employee Christmas party. Billy then embarks on a murder spree on Christmas Eve, killing numerous people he encounters and deems "naughty". On Christmas Day he arrives at the orphanage where he was raised to enact revenge on Mother Superior, but is stopped by police who shoot him to death.

The character was largely received by critics as offensive due to the violent acts he commits on Christmas, and the film was widely protested upon its theatrical release in 1984.

== Appearances ==
=== Films ===
In Silent Night, Deadly Night, Billy first appears at age five in 1971, driving with his parents and infant brother, Ricky, to visit his apparently catatonic grandfather in a psychiatric care facility on Christmas Eve; when the two are briefly left alone, Billy's grandfather breaks his silence and tells Billy that Santa Claus punishes children who are bad. On their way home, his parents stop on a desolate country road where a man in a Santa Claus suit has experienced a car breakdown. The man, however, is a criminal who had just robbed a liquor store and killed the owner. He tries to steal their car, and shoots Billy's father dead when he tries to escape. He then attempts to rape Billy's mother, and slits her throat after she hits him; Billy manages to hide in a ditch, and the killer flees the scene.

Billy and Ricky are placed in an orphanage run by the abusive and strict Mother Superior. Shunned by his peers, Billy finds companionship in the sympathetic Sister Margaret. At age eight, Billy witnesses two of the teenagers in the orphanage having sex; they are caught by Mother Superior, who punishes them severely. In 1984, at age eighteen, Billy leaves the orphanage and acquires a job at Ira's Toy Store. As the Christmas season arrives, however, Billy is troubled by hallucinations and posttraumatic stress related to his parents' murders. At the store's Christmas Eve party, while wearing a Santa Claus suit, he witnesses his male co-worker Andy attempting to rape his female co-worker/crush Pamela in the stock room. Billy snaps and murders them both, strangling Andy with Christmas lights and killing Pamela with a box cutter, then kills his boss Mr. Sims and manager Mrs. Randall.

Billy then embarks on a killing spree. He stumbles upon a suburban house where a couple, Denise and Tommy, are having sex. He impales Denise on a pair of antlers on a taxidermy deer head, and throws Tommy through a window to the ground below, killing him. The commotion awakens Denise's little sister, who sees Billy, dressed as Santa, in the living room. He asks if she's been naughty or nice, and then gives her the box cutter he had used when he murdered Pamela. After this, Billy follows teenage bullies Mac and Bob into the woods where they are sledding, and decapitates Mac with an axe as he sleds down a hillside and his friend screams in terror.

The next morning, Christmas Day, Billy arrives at the orphanage to kill Mother Superior and reunite with his brother Ricky; however, with the help of Sister Margaret, the police have already determined his arrival there, and lay in wait. After killing Officer Barnes, who had been patrolling the area, Billy enters the orphanage, where the children are unwrapping Christmas gifts; Mother Superior is a wheelchair user. He attempts to kill her, but is shot to death in front of the children, one of whom is his younger brother, Ricky; Ricky looks at the Mother Superior, and utters the word "naughty".

In Silent Night, Deadly Night Part 2, Billy appears in flashback via footage from Silent Night, Deadly Night as Ricky recounts he and his brother's troubled lives.

=== Merchandise ===
In 2017, NECA and Scream Factory released a special edition Silent Night, Deadly Night Blu-ray package, which included a Billy Chapman action figure that was exclusive to that particular offering. The 8-inch figure is dressed in a fabric Santa suit with removable sculpted hat and features the authorized likeness of actor Robert Brian Wilson, is fully poseable and comes with an axe and hammer accessories.

== Reception ==
In his review of Silent Night, Deadly Night, film critic Leonard Maltin admonished the character of Billy, writing: "what's next—the Easter Bunny as a child killer?" Further backlash from the public over the "killer Santa" character fueled the film's publicity campaign, but did not lead to generally favorable reception.

Chris E. Hayner of GameSpot ranked the character among the best horror film monsters ever and stated that the character was underrated among film viewers. He also expressed that it is Chapman's character which makes the original film enjoyable. Chad Byrnes of LA Weekly ranked the character at number seven of the greatest slasher killers in films. Byrnes stated that "you'll never look at Santa the same way again" after seeing the film. Zachary Paul of Bloody Disgusting feels that the character is one of the most socially awkward villains in a horror film. Refinery29's Elena Nicolaou placed the character on her list of most iconic movie santas. Entertainment Weekly ranked Chapman as the 15th "scariest big-screen psycho killers" in a horror film. On the other hand Fandango.com listed Chapman as the 8th worst slasher villains in any franchise.

== See also ==
- List of horror film villains
- Billy Lenz

== Works cited ==
- Maltin, Leonard (2008). Leonard Maltin's 2009 Movie Guide. Signet. ISBN 978-0-45122-468-2.
- Rockoff, Adam (2011). Going to Pieces: The Rise and Fall of the Slasher Film, 1978-1986. McFarland. ISBN 978-0-78646-932-1.
