= Christmas horror =

Genre of fiction and film

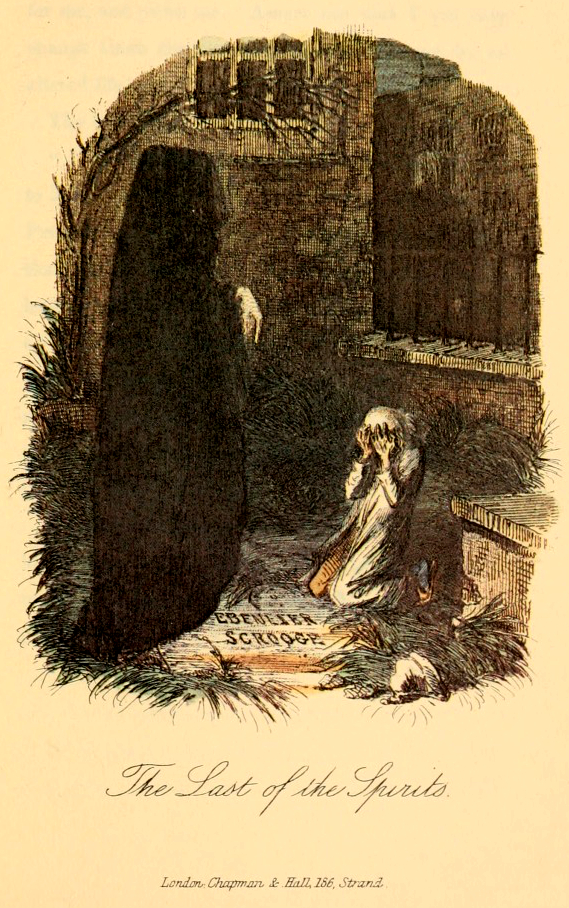
Ghost of Christmas Yet to Come terrorizing Ebenezer Scrooge

Christmas horror is a fiction genre and film genre that incorporates horror elements into the winter seasonal celebration setting.

== Origins and history ==
The genre is part of a seasonal tradition in the UK dating to prehistoric celebrations of the winter solstice. Hollywood Reporter said it was part of an early tradition of associating the death of winter with the coming rebirth of spring, citing Shakespeare's 1623 The Winter's Tale as a precursor to the genre.

Charles Dickens' 1843 A Christmas Carol is an early example of the genre in fiction, which according to the British Film Institute "forever tied the festive season to the genre". Dickens wrote other ghost stories that were explicitly Christmas-themed, such as The Haunted Man (1848), or simply published during the Christmas season, such as "The Signal-Man" (1866).

M. R. James wrote ghost stories in the early 1900s which he read aloud to friends at Christmas time as part of a tradition of such holiday entertainments. In 1954 the American EC Comics published an edition of Vault of Horror titled "...And All Through the House" which featured a killer dressed as Santa.

Horror was present in Christmas-themed films dating back to the early 1900s. Early examples include Wladyslaw Starewicz's Christmas Eve (1913), Victor Sjostrom's The Phantom Carriage (1921), and Christian-Jaque's Who Killed Santa Claus (1941).

In the 1970s, the BBC broadcast an annual A Ghost Story for Christmas based on James' short stories. It later produced Christopher Lee's Ghost Stories for Christmas in which Lee played James reading his stories aloud, and then a reboot of Ghost Story for Christmas, both series airing in the early 2000s.

Silent Night, Bloody Night (full film)

The film genre fully emerged in the 1970s and generated controversy. Early examples of the modern Christmas horror genre in film are 1971's Whoever Slew Auntie Roo? and the 1972 Silent Night, Bloody Night. 1972's Tales from the Crypt was adapted from the Vault of Horror "...And All Through the House" and was the first film to feature a killer dressed as Santa. 1974's Black Christmas is considered an influential classic of the genre and according to Stephen Thrower generally regarded as an influence on the 1978 Halloween. The genre faded for a few years amid a glut of slasher films in the late 1970s and early 1980s but was revived by Gremlins and Silent Night, Deadly Night, both in 1984, and revived from the late 80s through at least the late 2010s.

== Conventions ==
The genre typically juxtaposes horror elements with communal seasonal expectations of a period of peace and kindness. The genre is defined by a nostalgically Christmas-themed setting, typically with snow, iconic decorations and music, twinkling lights, and carolers, all intended to invoke a sense of peace before inducing a sense of terror.

Christmas horror novels and films are sometimes based on horror elements from a variety of Christmas storytelling traditions, including Krampus and Perchta of Central Europe and Icelandic folklore's Gryla, who punish miscreants, sometimes in cooperation with Santa Claus, and Kallikantzaroi of Southeastern Europe, who create general mayhem during the season. Examples of the genre in which a killer is disguised as Santa are common, while those in which an actual Santa commits violence are rare but exist.

== Popularity ==
Paste connected the popularity of the genre to the juxtaposition of violence and fear with a season that is commonly regarded as a time when people are expected to treat one another with unusual kindness, saying that "Setting a bloodbath against the pristine, jealously guarded specter of Christmas, on the other hand, has always been angling for a certain level of purposeful offense, because there have always been folks who take the defense of the holiday’s image very seriously. Perhaps tearing down that institution (or at least gently ribbing it) is simply too tempting to resist."

The Hollywood Reporter speculated that the genre's appeal was a reflection that "Christmas isn’t the happiest time of the year for everyone" and that it provided "a means to conquer and control some of the less delightful aspects that seep into the holiday".

NPR said the relatability of the genre seemed obvious: "It's not too hard to make the case that Christmas stories can be scary ... that large man sneaking into your home at midnight after watching you all year. No wonder there's an entire genre of Christmas-themed horror movies".

Matthew DuPée, author of A Scary Little Christmas: A History of Yuletide Horror Films, wrote that filmgoers "seeking an exhilarating alternative to the sickly sweet, feel-good Christmas movies found on the Hallmark Channel" explained the genre's popularity.

The genre has examples in multiple countries. Dick Maas' Sint (2010) was controversial among Dutch conservatives. Canadian films include Black Christmas, The Brain, Decoys, The Lodge and Unholy Night (2026), while Iceland has provided Unholy Night (2007), and Rare Exports was Finnish. Examples exist in the French, Spanish, Belgian, and Bollywood film industries.

== Controversy ==
While many critics denigrated the horror genre and in particular the slasher genre, Silent Night, Deadly Night's 1984 appearance, despite the release of other films including the same year's Don't Open till Christmas, drew protests sparked by promotional material, which featured a killer Santa with the tagline: "He knows when you've been naughty!" Six versions of the television commercial for the film were submitted to the Motion Picture Association's advertising code administration before it was approved.

The film also was unusual in that it fully integrated Christmas, and in particular Santa Claus, into the plotline. According to Fangoria editor Michael Gingold, the film, "in scene after scene, demonstrates a hatred for Christmas".

According to Going to Pieces: The Rise and Fall of the Slasher Film, a 2006 documentary, the movie "became the flashpoint, igniting protests across the nation". The film was released in the East Coast and Midwest in November 1984 by TriStar Pictures, but the protests and their national coverage led to the film's removal from distribution a week later. Some theaters continued to run it, including in Buffalo and Boston. The film was eventually rereleased by Aquarius Film Releasing with promotional materials that focussed on the film having been so outrageous that "parents everywhere" had "tried to ban it" and no images of Santa or references to Christmas.

== See also ==
- List of Christmas films
