= WWE brand extension =

Professional wrestling roster division in WWE

Raw and SmackDown have been the two main brands of WWE since the brand extension concept was first initiated in 2002. WWE also operates two developmental brands, NXT and Evolve.

The brand extension, also referred to as the brand split, is the separation of the American professional wrestling promotion WWE's roster of wrestlers (and, at various times, creative staff) into distinct divisions, or "brands". The promotion's wrestlers are assigned to a brand via the annual WWE Draft and exclusively perform on that brand's weekly television show, with some exceptions; wrestlers not assigned to a brand are regarded as "free agents". Throughout its history, WWE has utilized the brand extension twice. The first brand split occurred from 2002 to 2011, while the ongoing second began in 2016. The brand extension separates its wrestlers into different shows, such as Raw and SmackDown, helping attract more fans and increase revenue.

WWE currently promotes four brands. The two main brands, referred to as the main roster, are Raw and SmackDown. NXT, WWE's third brand, was launched in 2010 and has served as WWE's developmental territory since 2012. A fourth brand, Evolve, launched in March 2025 as a sister brand to NXT and features trainees from the WWE Performance Center and independent wrestlers recruited for the WWE Independent Development program.

The first brand split began in March 2002, following the company's acquisition of talent from the former World Championship Wrestling (WCW) and Extreme Championship Wrestling (ECW) promotions, and after the conclusion of The Invasion storyline. WWE's roster had doubled in size, and the company no longer had a major competitor in the professional wrestling industry. The brand extension was enacted to alleviate the issues of an overcrowded roster and to imitate competition the company no longer had from the former promotions. The first two brands established were Raw and SmackDown, named after the respective weekly shows, Raw and SmackDown. ECW—a revival of the former promotion—served as the third brand from 2006 to 2010. The first brand extension then ended on the August 29, 2011 episode of Raw after which was the show was promoted under the title "Raw Supershow" until Raw 1000 on July 23, 2012 with the Raw Supershow logo featuring elements of SmackDown's logo to emphasize the end of the first brand extension.

A relaunch of the brand extension as part "The New Era" went into effect on July 19, 2016. As before, Raw and SmackDown were the two primary brands, with NXT serving as a developmental brand and briefly as part of the main roster. Other brands during the second brand extension included NXT UK, a United Kingdom-based subsidiary of NXT which was active from 2016 to 2022 (scheduled to be relaunched as NXT Europe in the future), and 205 Live—a brand that specialized in cruiserweight wrestlers (with all wrestlers for the brand having a billed weight of 205 pounds and under) and was active from 2016 to 2022 (first as a Raw subsidiary, then as a standalone brand, and finally as an NXT subsidiary).

== List of WWE brands ==
Current

- Raw (2002–2011, 2016–present)
- SmackDown (2002–2011, 2016–present)
- NXT (2010–present) (Note: Unlike Raw and SmackDown, which are affected by WWE's brand extension, the NXT brand operates as a developmental system regardless of whether a brand split is in effect.)
- Evolve (2025–present)

Former

- ECW (2006–2010)
- 205 Live (2016–2022)
- NXT UK (2016–2022)

== History ==
=== 2002 split ===
In 2001, the Monday Night War, the rivalry between the World Wrestling Federation (WWF, now WWE) and World Championship Wrestling (WCW) ended with the WWF emerging victorious. The WWF would acquire the majority of assets of WCW, and later Extreme Championship Wrestling (ECW) (the third largest promotion in the United States at the time), through separate buyouts that included the employees (on and off-air talent) from both companies. The sales had left the WWF as the only major professional wrestling promotion in the world with international television distribution (until the national expansion of Total Nonstop Action Wrestling (TNA) in 2004 and much later, All Elite Wrestling (AEW) in 2019 on a larger scale).

With the acquisition of new talent, the WWF's already large roster doubled in size. In order to allow equal opportunity to all wrestlers, the company endorsed a brand extension to have the WWF represented and promoted with two brands, Raw and SmackDown!, named after the promotion's two primary television programs, Raw and SmackDown!, respectively.

In early 2002, the idea was put in motion to separate the WWF's two shows into distinct brands while both being under the WWF banner. One year prior, the original plan was to create a new WCW (which would be an independent entity in the storylines but would be under the WWF's auspices in reality), and for this new WCW to take over Raw and use the show to recreate its WCW counterpart, WCW Monday Nitro. (The WWF was unable to find a television time slot for WCW due to its exclusivity deal with Viacom.) This experiment was first made on July 2, 2001, when the final twenty minutes of Raw was given to WCW programming, in which the Raw crew was largely replaced (with Scott Hudson and Arn Anderson doing commentary, as well as a major stage overhaul) to present a match between Buff Bagwell and Booker T for the WCW World Heavyweight Championship, which Booker T had won on the final Nitro. The match was met with negative reactions from the fans and viewers at home, when the WWF wrestlers interfered at the end of the match. With WWF focused on splitting its roster, the Invasion storyline was used as a second resort.

Following the end of the angle at Survivor Series, the WWF executed their alternate plan, which was to separate the two shows themselves: previously, wrestlers appeared on both Raw and SmackDown, but with this extension, wrestlers would be exclusive to only one show. Only the Undisputed WWF Champion and the WWF Women's Champion were exempt and could appear on both shows. This would change as both championships were later assigned to a brand.

The brand extension began on March 25, 2002, with a draft on Raw and went into effect one week later on April 1. On May 6, 2002, the WWF was renamed to World Wrestling Entertainment (WWE, which became an orphaned initialism in 2011). On June 13, 2006, after an Extreme Championship Wrestling reunion pay-per-view and video releases, WWE announced an addition to its prime time programming with ECW on Sci-Fi. The new ECW brand launched in May 2006 and served as a third brand, and a revival of the original ECW promotion. Both instances of the brand extensions required that representatives of each brand draft "superstars" (terminology used by the company to refer to its contracted personnel) onto each brand in a draft lottery.

=== 2006 ECW introduction ===
After WWE bought all the assets of Extreme Championship Wrestling (ECW) in 2003, the company began releasing DVDs promoting the original ECW. Soon afterwards, the company promoted two ECW reunion shows for ECW alumni, entitled ECW One Night Stand in 2005 and in 2006.

On May 25, 2006, WWE announced a launch of a new brand, ECW, a revival of the former 1990s promotion. The new brand debuted on Syfy on June 13, 2006, with its final episode on February 16, 2010, on the rebranded Syfy. The ECW brand was dissolved and its show was replaced the following week with the reality series, WWE NXT.

=== 2016 split ===
On May 25, 2016, it was announced that beginning July 19, SmackDown would broadcast live on Tuesday nights, as opposed to being taped on Tuesdays and airing on Thursdays as it was previously, receiving a unique roster and set of writers compared to Raw, thus restoring the brand extension. The draft took place on the live premiere episode of SmackDown to determine the rosters between both brands. On the July 11 episode of Raw, Vince McMahon named Shane McMahon the (on-screen) commissioner for SmackDown and Stephanie McMahon the commissioner for Raw; both chose a General Manager for their respective shows. On the July 18 episode of Raw, Stephanie McMahon chose Mick Foley as the Raw General Manager, and Shane McMahon chose Daniel Bryan as the SmackDown General Manager. Due to Raw being a three-hour show and SmackDown being a two-hour show, Raw received three picks each round and SmackDown received two. Six draft picks had to be made amongst the non-title holders from WWE's developmental brand, NXT. Seth Rollins was picked first by Raw, with WWE Champion Dean Ambrose being SmackDown's first pick.

Two other brands would also be established during the second split. After the second brand extension began, WWE revived the cruiserweight division. The cruiserweight wrestlers were originally exclusive to Raw but had a supplementary show called 205 Live that premiered that November on the WWE Network. Following WrestleMania 34 in April 2018, the 205 Live brand was split from Raw, with the promotion's cruiserweight wrestlers becoming exclusive to the new brand. Additionally, in December 2016, WWE announced that they would be establishing a United Kingdom-based brand that would be produced exclusively in the country. In June 2018, the brand was officially established as NXT UK, a sub-brand of the American-based NXT. In September 2021, NXT was rebranded as NXT 2.0 and then in February 2022, the 205 Live brand was dissolved. In 2022, it was announced that NXT UK would be relaunched as NXT Europe and feature wrestlers from all of Europe. According to Shawn Michaels, two additional NXT sub-brands would also be launched: NXT Mexico and NXT Japan, which will also feature wrestlers from Mexico and Japan respectively. NXT Europe was originally planned for 2023 but was delayed due to WWE's acquisition by Endeavor, which also owns Ultimate Fighting Championship (UFC), with WWE and UFC merging to form TKO Group Holdings. The merger was finalized in September 2023. In September 2022 the brand dropped the 2.0 moniker, reverting to the NXT name, with a revised version of the logo featuring white lettering in the 2.0 font outlined in black and gold.

=== 2025 Evolve relaunch ===
In January 2025, it was reported that WWE were planning to revive Evolve as a brand. WWE acquired the assets of Evolve in July 2020. The company trademarked the name "Evolve" on January 30, 2025, with the first tapings set to be held at the WWE Performance Center on February 7, replacing WWE NXT Level Up, which was cancelled in December 2024. During the Royal Rumble on February 1, WWE announced that WWE Evolve would premiere on Tubi on March 5. The brand would feature up and coming wrestlers from the WWE Performance Center and the WWE Independent Development (ID) program with the goal for the WWE Evolve wrestlers is to make it to WWE's developmental brand, NXT, and eventually to the main roster on Raw or SmackDown.

== Programming effects ==
=== Interbrand competition ===
Interbrand competition was initially kept to a minimum, with wrestlers from all brands competing together only at pay-per-view events. However, from 2003 to 2007, all pay-per-view events became brand exclusive, leaving the "big four" pay-per-views (WrestleMania, SummerSlam, Survivor Series, and Royal Rumble) as the only interbrand shows.

Starting in late 2006, in an attempt to add more star power to the shows, interbrand matches became more common. Most notably, MNM and The Hardy Boyz reformed, despite the teammates being on separate brands. Bobby Lashley was also notable for his interbrand action, as he was involved in a storyline with Donald Trump against WWE Chairman Vince McMahon, which carried over from Raw through WrestleMania 23 to ECW. The brief return of Saturday Night's Main Event to NBC also led to more interaction between the brands.

Interbrand competition returned with the reestablishment of the brand extension in 2016; the first interbrand match that occurred after the brand extension went into full effect was at SummerSlam on August 21, 2016, where Raw's Brock Lesnar defeated SmackDown's Randy Orton. The next large interbrand matches occurred at Survivor Series on November 20, 2016, featuring traditional Survivor Series elimination tag team matches between Raw and SmackDown, and beginning the following year, the event became about brand supremacy; in addition to the traditional Survivor Series matches, each champion of the Raw brand faces their counterpart of the SmackDown brand in non-title matches (e.g., the Universal Champion against the WWE Champion). Following the 2019 WWE Superstar Shake-up, a Wild Card Rule was introduced. Interbrand competition became much more frequent, with interbrand matches occurring weekly on Raw and SmackDown Live, as well as at pay-per-views. With a second draft of 2019 occurring in October, the Wild Card Rule was abolished.

In May 2020, select and limited interbrand matches returned with the introduction of the Brand to Brand Invitational, though under stricter guidelines than the previous Wild Card Rule. This happened largely as a result of the COVID-19 pandemic, in which several wrestlers had opted to not perform during the outbreak, thus resulting in fewer available talent on each show.

=== Pay-per-view and livestreaming events ===
The separation of the WWE roster between two brands also intended to split the pay-per-view (also known as premium live event from 2022) offerings, which began with Bad Blood in June 2003. The original idea had the "major" pay-per-view events at the time (Royal Rumble, SummerSlam, Survivor Series, and WrestleMania) would contain the only instances where wrestlers from different brands would interact with each other, and even among the four shows only the Royal Rumble and WrestleMania would have wrestlers from different brands competing against each other. Wrestlers, as a result, appeared only in two-thirds of the shows in a given year, and thus appeared in fewer shows compared to before the brand extension. With single-brand PPVs in place, WWE was able to add more pay-per-view events to their offerings, such as Taboo Tuesday/Cyber Sunday, New Year's Revolution, December to Dismember, and The Great American Bash. Eventually, WWE abandoned the practice of single-brand pay-per-view events following WrestleMania 23. December to Dismember and New Year's Revolution were cancelled following the announcement.

With the reintroduction of the brand extension in 2016, single-branded pay-per-view events returned, and seven more pay-per-view events were added in 2017 so that each brand could have their own pay-per-view each month, in addition to the four major pay-per-views, in which both brands were involved. The only exception to this were the two months leading up to WrestleMania 33 in order to build the feuds for that event, and the two months (including the month of WrestleMania) following WrestleMania to begin new feuds for each brand. For example, February 2017 only had a SmackDown pay-per-view while March only had one for Raw. WrestleMania 33 was on April 2 and Raw had its first post-WrestleMania pay-per-view on April 30, while only SmackDown had a pay-per-view in May. This also happened in 2018, however, for 2018, WWE announced that following WrestleMania 34, brand-exclusive PPVs would be discontinued, abandoning the single-brand practice for a second time. The 2018 Elimination Chamber and Fastlane events were the last two brand-exclusive pay-per-views for Raw and SmackDown, respectively.

Since the launch of the WWE Network service in 2014, each brand have its own set of PPVs/PLEs each month with the main roster events (Raw and SmackDown) being dual-branded while NXT kept its brand-exclusive premium live events regardless the brand extension is in operation or not (from 2014 to 2021, NXT promoted its specials under the TakeOver banner), while NXT UK had this similar practice.

=== Championships ===
Initially, the Undisputed WWE Championship and the original WWE Women's Championship were available to both brands. The other championships were exclusive to the brand for which the champion was rostered. When the brand extension began, Raw received the Intercontinental Championship and European Championship when their respective holders were drafted, while SmackDown! became the exclusive home for the Tag Team Championship and the original Cruiserweight Championship. With several specialty championships being exclusive to one brand, numerous wrestlers were left with no title to fight for except for the Hardcore Championship, which although a property of SmackDown! after the draft, it was contested under different rules than the other championships—the European and Hardcore championships were later unified with the Intercontinental Championship in July and August 2002, respectively, deactivating both championships.

The issue of specialty championships being exclusive to one brand was partially corrected in September 2002. When SmackDown! general manager Stephanie McMahon announced that Undisputed Champion Brock Lesnar signed a deal to exclusively appear on SmackDown!, Raw general manager Eric Bischoff introduced the World Heavyweight Championship for Raw. Shortly thereafter, Raw became the exclusive brand for the World Tag Team Championship, the Intercontinental Championship, and the Women's Championship. Meanwhile, SmackDown! created the WWE Tag Team Championship and revived the United States Championship. The result was each brand having four championships: World Heavyweight, Intercontinental, World Tag Team, and Women's titles for Raw; WWE, United States, Tag Team, and Cruiserweight titles for SmackDown!. When ECW was revived in 2006 as a third brand, the ECW World Heavyweight Championship was reactivated as the brand's only championship. Over the course of the first brand extension, these championships switched between brands, usually due to the result of the annual draft. The Cruiserweight title, however, was the only championship to never switch brands, staying on SmackDown! from 2002 until the championship's retirement on September 28, 2007.

In October 2007, SmackDown! and ECW began a talent exchange agreement, which meant that SmackDown! wrestlers could appear on ECW and vice versa (both shows were taped as part of the same Tuesday night tapings at the time). This allowed the United States Championship and WWE Tag Team Championship to be shared between the two brands. In July 2008, the WWE Divas Championship was created for SmackDown, allowing SmackDown's women wrestlers to compete for a title. A talent exchange between ECW and Raw then began in September 2008. After John Morrison and The Miz of ECW became World Tag Team Champions, they appeared more frequently on the Raw brand, moving to a feud with reigning WWE Tag Team Champions of SmackDown, brothers Carlito and Primo Colon. The teams fought several non-title and title bouts for their respective brands' tag team championships before the two fought in a winner-take-all title unification lumberjack match at WrestleMania 25. Carlito and Primo would go on to win the contest, forming the Unified WWE Tag Team Championship. The tag team championships remained separate titles, but were defended collectively as the Unified WWE Tag Team Championship until the then-anonymous general manager of Raw announced that the World Tag Team Championship would be retired in favor of continuing the WWE Tag Team Championship, which received a new, single set of belts. On February 16, 2010, the ECW Championship was deactivated along with the ECW brand. On September 19, 2010, at Night of Champions, the Women's Championship was unified with the Divas Championship, retiring the Women's Championship in the process; the Divas Championship was briefly referred to as the Unified WWE Divas Championship. The first brand extension would then end a year later and all champions could appear on both shows.

In 2012, NXT became a developmental brand for WWE and they introduced the NXT Championship that year, followed by the NXT Women's Championship and NXT Tag Team Championship in 2013. On December 15, 2013, at TLC: Tables, Ladders & Chairs, the World Heavyweight Championship was unified with the WWE Championship to become the WWE World Heavyweight Championship. The title retained the lineage of the WWE Championship and the World Heavyweight Championship was retired. The name was reverted to WWE Championship on June 27, 2016. At WrestleMania 32 on April 3, 2016, the Divas Championship was retired and then replaced with a brand-new WWE Women's Championship.

After five years, a new brand extension was introduced on July 19, 2016. Raw drafted the WWE Women's Champion, the United States Champion, and the WWE Tag Team Champions, while SmackDown drafted the WWE Champion and the Intercontinental Champion; NXT champions were ineligible to be drafted. This distribution of championships remained unchanged at the Battleground pay-per-view, which took place the Sunday immediately following the draft. With the WWE Championship being defended exclusively on SmackDown, Raw commissioner Stephanie McMahon and general manager Mick Foley introduced the WWE Universal Championship to be Raw's world title. As SmackDown was lacking a tag team championship and a women's championship, SmackDown commissioner Shane McMahon and general manager Daniel Bryan introduced the SmackDown Tag Team Championship and SmackDown Women's Championship. Subsequently, the WWE Women's Championship and the WWE Tag Team Championship were renamed as the Raw Women's Championship and the Raw Tag Team Championship, respectively. With this, each brand had a world championship, a secondary championship, a tag team championship, and a women's championship.

Since Raw became the exclusive home of WWE's revived cruiserweight division, they also created a new WWE Cruiserweight Championship. Beginning November 29, 2016, in addition to Raw, the Cruiserweight Championship was defended on the cruiserweight-exclusive show, 205 Live. 205 Live would become its own brand in 2018, making the title exclusive to the brand. The WWE United Kingdom Championship was unveiled in December 2016 with its inaugural holder determined in January 2017. The title later became the top championship for the United Kingdom-based NXT spinoff, NXT UK, which debuted in mid-2018 and also introduced the NXT UK Women's Championship and NXT UK Tag Team Championship; the WWE United Kingdom Championship was renamed to NXT United Kingdom Championship in January 2020. A secondary title of the NXT brand was also introduced in mid-2018, the NXT North American Championship.

In early 2019, the WWE Women's Tag Team Championship was established to be shared between Raw, SmackDown, and NXT. In May 2019, the WWE 24/7 Championship was established. Defended across all five of WWE's brands, it was open to anyone, regardless of gender or WWE employment status. In October 2019, after NXT's creative team took over 205 Live, the WWE Cruiserweight Championship was renamed to NXT Cruiserweight Championship, with the title shared between 205 Live and NXT, and was later extended to NXT UK in January 2020. A secondary title was later introduced for NXT UK called the NXT UK Heritage Cup with its own special stipulations. Subsequently, the NXT Women's Tag Team Championship was created for NXT with the WWE Women's Tag Team Championship becoming only shared between Raw and SmackDown. In January 2022, the NXT Cruiserweight Championship was retired after it was unified with the NXT North American Championship. In September 2022, the NXT United Kingdom Championship, the NXT UK Women's Championship, and the NXT UK Tag Team Championship were retired and unified into their respective NXT counterparts after the NXT UK brand went on hiatus (which will relaunch in 2023 as NXT Europe). The NXT UK Heritage Cup was not retired and after months of inactivity, it was transferred to NXT in April 2023 and renamed the NXT Heritage Cup. The 24/7 Championship was also retired in November 2022.

At WrestleMania 38 in April 2022, SmackDown's Universal Champion Roman Reigns defeated Raw's WWE Champion Brock Lesnar to win both titles and become the Undisputed WWE Universal Champion, although both titles retained their individual lineages. Similarly in May 2022, SmackDown Tag Team Champions The Usos (Jey Uso and Jimmy Uso) defeated Raw Tag Team Champions RK-Bro (Randy Orton and Riddle) to win both titles and become the Undisputed WWE Tag Team Champions, although both titles retained their individual lineages; Kevin Owens and Sami Zayn would then win the tag titles at WrestleMania 39; One year later, the Undisputed WWE Tag Team Championship would finally split at WrestleMania XL in a Six-Pack Ladder Match with A-Town Down Under winning the SmackDown Tag Team Championships and Awesome Truth winning the Raw Tag Team Championships, both of these titles would eventually renamed as the WWE Tag Team Championship and World Tag Team Championship respectively and both received new belt designs one week later. Meanwhile, a new World Heavyweight Championship was introduced for the brand that did not draft Roman Reigns in the 2023 draft, with Reigns keeping his Undisputed WWE Universal Championship. SmackDown drafted Reigns, thus the World Heavyweight Championship became exclusive to Raw. In June 2023, Reigns received a new belt design that represent the Undisputed WWE Universal Championship, he would then finally drop the title to Cody Rhodes at Night 2 of WrestleMania XL on April 7, 2024 and the championship was later renamed as the Undisputed WWE Championship. After Rhodes lost to John Cena at WrestleMania 41 one year later, WWE officially retired the Universal Championship in favor of continuing the WWE Championship (with the former amended its records by removing Rhodes, recognizing Reigns instead as the final champion and declared April 7, 2024 as the official retirement of its lineage).

=== Free agents ===
Within WWE, wrestlers who are not assigned to a brand are regarded as free agents. In storyline, this allows them to freely appear on any program without any special arrangements, such as by invitation (such as a Raw wrestler appearing on SmackDown or a SmackDown wrestler appearing on Raw). Newly signed wrestlers to WWE's main roster who are not immediately assigned to a brand are regarded as free agents until they sign with a brand. Some wrestlers are granted free agency depending on their status, usually high-level part-time performers. For example, after John Cena began appearing less and less on account of his movie roles, becoming a part-time performer, he became a permanent free agent in 2017 until his retirement in 2025.

== Similar concepts ==
Although mostly regarded as a WWE concept, brand extensions have also occurred in other professional wrestling promotions. In the 1990s, then-President of World Championship Wrestling (WCW) Eric Bischoff proposed a brand extension between WCW and the popular New World Order (nWo) stable, which would have seen the group expand in scope and the production of nWo-branded programming; this concept was scrapped due to budgetary concerns. However, in 1997, an nWo-exclusive pay-per-view, Souled Out, was held. A year later in 1998, WCW began co-branding all of its pay-per-view events under the "WCW/nWo" banner, a practice that continued into 1999.

In the mid-2000s, New Japan Pro-Wrestling introduced a brand extension which divided their roster into two sub-brands: Wrestle Land and Lock Up; around the same period, fellow Japanese promotion Kaientai Dojo promoted two sub-brands for their roster, Get and Rave. In 2013, AAA launched a brand extension that split their roster into two sub-brands, Evolución and Fusión.

A similar concept to WWE's brand extension is currently utilized by the Japanese promotions CyberFight, an umbrella brand for three distinct promotions—Pro Wrestling Noah, with "King's Road-style" Puroresu, DDT Pro-Wrestling, with comedy wrestling and Tokyo Joshi Pro Wrestling, with Joshi (women's) wrestling, and GLEAT, which also promotes three sub-brands—G Prowrestling is traditional puroresu, Lidet UWF is UWFi-inspired shoot-style wrestling, and Gleat MMA is legitimate mixed martial arts. Following the acquisition of Ring of Honor (ROH) by All Elite Wrestling (AEW) founder Tony Khan in March 2022, ROH and AEW are operated independently with separate rosters and championships while both are under Khan's ownership. In 2023, AEW launched a soft brand extension between its Dynamite and Collision programs, which saw select wrestlers featured exclusively on one of the two shows for a select period of time; this was mostly abolished after CM Punk (who was almost exclusively featured on Collision) was fired for his legitimate backstage incident with Jack Perry at that year's All In event.
