= Michael Hickey (screenwriter) =

American screenwriter

- Born: Manhasset, New York, U.S.
- Occupation: Writer

Michael Hickey, originally of Manhasset, New York, was a screenwriter best known for the screenplay of the horror film Silent Night, Deadly Night. Hickey's controversial screenplay focused on a serial killer who, disguised as Santa Claus, takes the lyric "He knows if you've been bad or good so be good for goodness sake" rather too literally.

Hickey also authored the stage play Murrow about the life of newscaster Edward R. Murrow, which premiered at the Bristol Riverside Theater in Bucks County, Pennsylvania. Hickey directed a production of the play at the Producers Club in New York City under the title A Question of Loyalty in 1998.

Hickey received a screen credit ("special thanks") on the restored version of Alfred Hitchcock's 1958 "Vertigo" in recognition of his contribution to the 1998 restoration of the film performed by Robert Harris and James Katz for Universal Pictures.

Hickey retired to Palm Springs, California and died November 30, 2024.
