= Silent Night, Deadly Night (film series) =

American Christmas horror film series

- Silent Night, Deadly Night Parts 3–5 DVD set
- Running time: 531 minutes (total)
- Country: United States
- Language: English

Silent Night, Deadly Night is an American Christmas horror film series, consisting of seven films. The first film in the series, Silent Night, Deadly Night (1984), originally titled Slay Ride, tells the story of Billy, a young man who experiences a psychotic breakdown and goes on a murder spree dressed as Santa Claus. The film received theatrical distribution from TriStar Pictures, but was pulled from theaters in November 1984 after a series of protests against the film.

The second film, Silent Night, Deadly Night Part 2 (1987) continues the story of Billy's younger brother, Ricky, who also goes on a murder spree, and is largely made up of flashbacks featuring footage from the first film. The third film, Better Watch Out! released direct-to-video (as were the next two films), concludes the Billy/Ricky storyline, and follows Ricky as he stalks a clairvoyant blind woman on her way to visit her grandmother for Christmas Eve. The fourth film, Initiation (1990), departs from the killer Santa storyline, centering on a feminist cult in Los Angeles, California who are planning a ritual sacrifice. Directed by Brian Yuzna, the film features special effects by Screaming Mad George. The fifth film, The Toy Maker (1991), stars Mickey Rooney as a toy store proprietor whose brand of toys come to life and murder their owners.

In 2012, a loose remake of the original film, entitled Silent Night, was released by Anchor Bay Films, starring Jaime King and Malcolm McDowell. It was the first film in the series to receive a theatrical release since Part 2 in 1987. It was followed by another remake, Silent Night, Deadly Night, which was released in December 2025.

== Films ==
Film	U.S. release date	Director(s)	Screenwriter(s)	Producer(s)
Silent Night, Deadly Night	November 9, 1984	Charles Sellier, Jr.	Paul Caimi (story) and Michael Hickey	Ira Barmak, Scott Schneid, Dennis Whitehead
Silent Night, Deadly Night Part 2	April 10, 1987	Lee Harry	Lee Harry and Joseph H. Earle	Lawrence Appelbaum
Silent Night, Deadly Night 3: Better Watch Out!	November 17, 1989	Monte Hellman	Monte Hellman and Rex Weiner	Arthur H. Gorson
Silent Night, Deadly Night 4: Initiation	November 21, 1990	Brian Yuzna	Woody Keith	Richard N. Gladstein
Silent Night, Deadly Night 5: The Toy Maker	November 7, 1991	Martin Kitrosser	Martin Kitrosser and Brian Yuzna	Richard N. Gladstein and Brian Yuzna
Silent Night	November 30, 2012	Steven C. Miller	Jayson Rothwell	Shara Kay, Phyllis Laing, and Richard Saperstein
Silent Night, Deadly Night	December 12, 2025	Mike P. Nelson	Mike P. Nelson	Scott J. Schneid, Dennis Whitehead, and Jamie R. Thompson

=== Silent Night, Deadly Night (1984) ===
In the original Silent Night, Deadly Night (1984), five-year-old Billy Chapman is on a road trip with his parents and little brother to visit his elderly grandfather on Christmas Eve. After leaving the nursing home, Billy witnesses his parents get murdered on a rural road by a criminal dressed in a Santa Claus suit. Placed in an orphanage and separated from his infant brother, Billy is abused by the Mother Superior (Lilyan Chauvin) and grows increasingly disturbed. As an adult, Billy gets a job working at a toy store, where the holiday season triggers post-traumatic stress disorder over his parents' death. He embarks on a murder spree dressed in a Santa suit on Christmas Eve, and arrives at the orphanage that he grew up in to enact revenge on the Mother Superior; he is stopped by Sister Margaret, a sympathetic nun, and is killed by the police in front of his younger brother, Ricky, who is now in the orphanage himself.

=== Silent Night, Deadly Night Part 2 (1987) ===
In Silent Night, Deadly Night Part 2 (1987), Ricky, now 18 years old, has been incarcerated in an insane asylum for murdering his girlfriend and her ex-boyfriend, suffering from similar psychosis due to a traumatic upbringing. The film utilizes flashbacks, integrating footage from the original film to build the narrative. While relaying his story to a psychiatrist, Ricky escapes from the asylum and murders a Salvation Army Santa Claus, stealing his costume. He seeks out the Mother Superior, now living in a private residence, to avenge Billy. He succeeds where Billy had failed years before and kills the Mother Superior in her own house. He is shot by the police, but survives his wounds.

=== Silent Night, Deadly Night 3: Better Watch Out! (1989) ===
Silent Night, Deadly Night 3: Better Watch Out! (1989) picks up six years later, after Ricky (Bill Moseley) has been in a coma from his wounds; a transparent dome has been affixed to his head so that repairs can be made to his skull. Laura, a clairvoyant blind woman, has been attempting to make contact with Ricky through experimental sessions with a doctor. On Christmas Eve, Ricky awakens from his coma and breaks out of the hospital. En route to visit her grandmother on Christmas Eve alongside her brother and his girlfriend, Laura feels that someone is following them. They arrive at their grandmother's house, but find it empty. Laura has visions from her dead grandmother, who has been murdered by Ricky, and the three are ambushed by him. Police eventually arrive, finding Laura to be the only survivor, aside from an unnamed second victim.

=== Silent Night, Deadly Night 4: Initiation (1990) ===
Silent Night, Deadly Night 4: Initiation (1990) deviates from the "killer Santa" plot and the slasher film genre, following a Los Angeles journalist, Kim Levitt (Neith Hunter) who finds herself enmeshed with a witch cult who worship Lilith. Fima (Maud Adams), a bookstore owner, is the leader of the cult, who plans to draw Kim in and initiate her with a ritual sacrifice on Christmas Eve with the help of Ricky (Clint Howard), a transient who works as her henchman. However, during the attempted sacrifice, Kim murders Fima.

=== Silent Night, Deadly Night 5: The Toy Maker (1991) ===
Silent Night, Deadly Night 5: The Toy Maker (1991) also follows an unrelated plot but goes back to the series' slasher genre, in which a young boy named Derek meets a mysterious toy store owner, Joe Petto (Mickey Rooney) whose toys are designed to kill. Sarah, Derek's mother, manages to kill Joe's son, Pino, who is revealed to actually be an animatronic toy himself. Kim make a cameo appearance in the film.

=== Silent Night (2012) ===
Silent Night (2012) is a loose remake of the original film, and follows Aubrey Bradimore (Jaime King), a police officer in a small town who is hunting a serial killer dressed in a Santa Claus suit who has embarked on a killing spree on Christmas Eve. Her supervisor, Sheriff Cooper (Malcolm McDowell) helps her track the killer, who has murdered a series of the town's residents, including children. Aubrey is able to corner the killer inside the police station, and kills him with a flamethrower. It is revealed that the killer, Ronald, had gone mad over the death of his father, a serial killer who was shot to death by Aubrey's father, who was also a police officer.

=== Silent Night, Deadly Night (2025) ===
On March 2, 2021, a second remake was announced when Orwo Studios and Black Hanger Studios acquired the rights to the original film. In November 2024, a "reimagining" of the original film was announced to be produced by Cineverse. The movie was written and directed by Mike P. Nelson, and was released in December 2025. In April 2025, Rohan Campbell was cast as Billy Chapman.

== Recurring cast and characters ==
List indicators

This section includes characters who will appear or have appeared in the franchise.

- An empty grey cell indicates the character was not in the film, or that the character's official presence has not yet been confirmed.
- ^{Y} indicates a younger version of the character.

Characters	Original series					Remake	Second remake
Characters	Silent Night, Deadly Night	Silent Night, Deadly Night Part 2	Silent Night, Deadly Night 3: Better Watch Out!	Silent Night, Deadly Night 4: Initiation	Silent Night, Deadly Night 5: The Toy Maker	Silent Night	Silent Night, Deadly Night
Characters	1984	1987	1989	1990	1991	2012	2025
Ricky Chapman	Alex Burton Max Broadhead^{Y} Melissa Best^{Y}	Eric Freeman Darrel Guilbeau^{Y} Brian Michael Henley^{Y}	Bill Moseley				
Mother Superior	Lilyan Chauvin	Jean Miller					
Billy Chapman	Robert Brian Wilson Danny Wagner^{Y} Jonathan Best^{Y}						Rohan Campbell
Pamela	Toni Nero						Ruby Modine
Ricky Baker				Clint Howard	Clint Howard		
Kim Levitt				Neith Hunter	Neith Hunter		
Lonnie				Conan Yuzna	Conan Yuzna		

== Reception ==
=== Box office performance ===
Only the first two films were released theatrically, and the loose remake was given a limited theatrical release. Silent Night, Deadly Night was acquired for distribution by TriStar Pictures in 1984, and was released theatrically on November 9, 1984. However, the film received harsh criticism from the public, who believed it to be an attack on Christmas. Protests at theaters showing the film occurred throughout the nation. At its East Coast premiere at the Interboro Quad Theater in The Bronx, New York City, over 100 picketers stood outside in protest of the film, singing Christmas carols and holding signs. Though the film was a financial success, TriStar decided to pull advertisements for the film, and scrapped a planned theatrical run on the West Coast.

Film	U.S. release date	Budget	Box office revenue			Reference
Film	U.S. release date	Budget	United States	Foreign	Worldwide	Reference
1. Silent Night, Deadly Night	November 9, 1984	$750,000	$2,491,460		$2,491,460	
2. Silent Night, Deadly Night Part 2	April 10, 1987	$250,000	$154,323		$154,323	
3. Silent Night, Deadly Night 3: Better Watch Out!	November 17, 1989 †					
4. Silent Night, Deadly Night 4: Initiation	November 21, 1990 †					
5. Silent Night, Deadly Night 5: The Toy Maker	November 6, 1991 †					
6. Silent Night	November 30, 2012	$3,750,000	$14,567	$100,065	$114,633	
7. Silent Night, Deadly Night (2025)	December 12, 2025		$1,495,324	$4,091,560	$5,586,884	
Total		$4,750,000	$4,155,674	$4,191,625	$8,347,300	
List indicators: A light grey cell indicates the information is not available for the film; † indicates direct-to-video release

== Music ==
The Death Waltz music label released a double vinyl LP of the original film's soundtrack, featuring the original song from the film, "Santa's Watching". The vinyl LP was limited to 400 copies worldwide.

== Home media ==
=== VHS and laserdisc ===
The original film was released on VHS and laserdisc as were Parts 2–5. They were all released by LIVE Home Video, although the company went by U.S.A. Home Video and IVE for some of the early releases.

=== DVD and Blu-ray ===
In 2002, Anchor Bay Entertainment released a double-feature DVD of Silent Night, Deadly Night, and Silent Night, Deadly Night Part 2 on a double-sided disc. This release featured an extended cut of the original film, with inserts of footage that had been excised from the original theatrical cut of the film. In 2012, it was reissued by Anchor Bay as two separate discs.

On December 1, 2009, Parts 3–5 were released on DVD in North America for the first time in a three-disc set by Lionsgate, who had acquired the licensing rights from LIVE Video after its dissolution. The three films were presented in their 1.33:1 full frame aspect ratio.

Silent Night, Deadly Night (1984) made its Blu-ray premiere through Anchor Bay Entertainment on September 16, 2014. In September 2017, it was announced that Scream Factory would be releasing a collector's edition Blu-ray of the film, featuring new bonus material. Additionally, a limited 2,000-unit run will feature a complementary Billy action figure, as well as a poster, due for release December 5, 2017.

Silent Night (2012) was released on Blu-ray and DVD on December 4, 2012, during the film's limited theatrical and VOD release. Anchor Bay also released a double feature of Silent Night, Deadly Night (1984) and Silent Night (2012) on Blu-ray on May 12, 2015.

On December 5, 2017, Scream Factory released Silent Night, Deadly Night (1984) on Blu-ray in a two-disc collector's edition featuring new bonus material and a 4K remaster from the original film negative.

== Merchandise ==
In December 2014, the merchandise company Fright-Rags released a gift pack based on the original Silent Night, Deadly Night. Items included a stocking, a Christmas ornament, a T-shirt, a Christmas jumper, and a gift box.

An action figure of Billy was released by the brand Retrobrand in December 2013. On December 5, 2017, Scream Factory released a limited edition action figure of Billy holding his double-bit axe, which was sold exclusively through their website as an accompaniment to their new Blu-ray release of the original film. This action figure, which was also paired with a poster, was limited to 2,000 units.

== Works cited ==
- Muir, John Kenneth (2012). Horror Films of the 1980s. Vol. 1. McFarland. ISBN 978-0-786-47298-7.
- Rockoff, Adam (2011). Going to Pieces: The Rise and Fall of the Slasher Film (1978-1986). McFarland. ISBN 978-0-78646-932-1.
