= Richard Einhorn =

American composer of contemporary classical music

Richard Einhorn (born 1952) is an American composer of contemporary classical music.

Einhorn graduated summa cum laude and Phi Beta Kappa from Columbia University in 1975, and studied composition and electronic music with Jack Beeson, Vladimir Ussachevsky, and Mario Davidovsky.

His best-known work, Voices of Light (1994), is an oratorio scored for soloists, chorus, orchestra, and a bell. It was inspired by Carl Theodor Dreyer's silent film The Passion of Joan of Arc (1928), and it has been performed while the film is screened. He has also composed many horror and thriller film scores, including Shock Waves (1977), Don't Go in the House (1979), Eyes of a Stranger (1981), The Prowler (1981), Dead of Winter (1987), Blood Rage (1987), Sister, Sister (1987), and Dark Tower (1989). He also contributed to the soundtrack of Liberty! The American Revolution (1997).

In his mid-fifties, Einhorn experienced significant hearing loss. In a 2011 New York Times article, he discussed his use of hearing loops to enjoy concerts with his hearing aid.

== Musical works ==
=== Concert works ===
- The Origin "is a multimedia oratorio in celebration of the life and work of Charles Darwin". Libretto compiled from Darwin's writings by Einhorn and the American poet Catherine Barnett
- Voices of Light oratorio
- Maxwell's Demon ##1-4, for electric violin (1988–1990); later adapted for the 1994 Ulysses Dove ballet Red Angels
- A Carnival of Miracles for four voices
- The Fourth Manner of Loving for chorus and orchestra
- My Many Colored Days by Dr. Seuss for symphony orchestra and narrator

=== Film scores ===
- Shock Waves (1977, dir. Ken Wiederhorn)
- Don't Go in the House (1979, dir. Joseph Ellison)
- Eyes of a Stranger (1981, dir. Ken Wiederhorn)
- The Prowler (1981, dir. Joseph Zito)
- Blood Rage (1983, dir. John Grissmer)
- Dead of Winter (1987, dir. Arthur Penn)
- Sister, Sister (1987, dir. Bill Condon)
- Necessary Parties (1988, dir. Gwen Arner)
- Dark Tower (1989, dir. Freddie Francis & Ken Wiederhorn)
- Closet Land (1991, dir. Radha Bharadwaj) – with Philip Glass
- Darrow (1991, dir. John David Coles)
- A House in the Hills (1993, dir. Ken Wiederhorn)
- Fire-Eater (1998, dir. Pirjo Honkasalo)
