= Peter Teschner =

American film editor

- Occupation: Film editor
- Years active: 1982–Present

Peter Teschner is an American film editor. He is best known as the editor of comedy films such as Road Trip, Dodgeball: A True Underdog Story, Borat, and Going the Distance. Teschner is a 1980 graduate of Columbia College Chicago and in 2006 he was honored with the school's Alumni of the Year award for his Outstanding Contribution to a Field of Motion Picture Editing.

== Filmography ==
Year	Film	Director	Notes
1986	Dreamaniac	David DeCoteau	
1987	Enemy Territory	Peter Manoogian	
1988	Phantasm II	Don Coscarelli	
1988	Jailbird Rock	Phillip Schuman	
1989	Society	Brian Yuzna	
1989	Deadly Weapon	Michael Miner	
1989	Bride of Re-Animator	Brian Yuzna	
1990	The Dark Side of the Moon	D.J. Webster	
1990	Silent Night, Deadly Night 4: Initiation	Brian Yuzna	
1990	Puppet Master II	David W. Allen	
1991	Only the Lonely	Chris Columbus	
1992	Only You	Betty Thomas	
1992	Mastergate	Michael Engler	Television film
1993	All Tied Up	John Mark Robinson	
1993	A House in the Hills	Ken Wiederhorn	
1994	The Little Rascals	Penelope Spheeris	
1994	Tollbooth	Salomé Breziner	
1995	The Brady Bunch Movie	Betty Thomas	
1996	The Late Shift	Betty Thomas	Television film
1997	Private Parts	Betty Thomas	
1998	Dr. Dolittle	Betty Thomas	
1999	The Muse	Albert Brooks	
2000	28 Days	Betty Thomas	
2000	Road Trip	Todd Phillips	
2000	Charlie's Angels	McG	
2001	Josie and the Pussycats	Harry Elfont; Deborah Kaplan	
2001	Scary Movie 2	Keenen Ivory Wayans	
2002	I Spy	Betty Thomas	
2003	Legally Blonde 2: Red, White & Blonde	Charles Herman-Wurmfeld	
2004	Dodgeball: A True Underdog Story	Rawson Marshall Thurber	Uncredited
2005	The Wendell Baker Story	Andrew Wilson; Luke Wilson	
2005	Kicking & Screaming	Jesse Dylan	
2006	Borat: Cultural Learnings of America for Make Benefit Glorious Nation of Kazakhstan	Larry Charles	
2008	Definitely, Maybe	Adam Brooks	
2008	Semi-Pro	Kent Alterman	
2009	Land of the Lost	Brad Silberling	
2009	The Marc Pease Experience	Todd Louiso	
2010	Going the Distance	Nanette Burstein	
2011	Horrible Bosses	Seth Gordon	
2013	Identity Thief	Seth Gordon	
2014	St. Vincent	Theodore Melfi	
2015	Unfinished Business	Ken Scott	
2016	Hidden Figures	Theodore Melfi	
2019	Ode to Joy	Jason Winer	
2021	The Starling	Theodore Melfi	
2022	Marry Me	Kat Coiro	
2024	The Idea of You	Michael Showalter	
2025	The Life List	Adam Brooks	

Editorial department

Year	Film	Director	Notes
1986	The Falling	Deran Sarafian	Additional editor
1996	Bio-Dome	Jason Bloom	Additional editor
2000	Road Trip	Todd Phillips	Film editor
2003	Bad Santa	Terry Zwigoff	Additional editor
2017	The Layover	William H. Macy	Additional editing
2019	Brittany Runs a Marathon	Paul Downs Colaizzo	Additional editor

Production manager

Year	Film	Director	Notes
1986	The Falling	Deran Sarafian	Post-production supervisor
1990	Silent Night, Deadly Night 4: Initiation	Brian Yuzna	Post-production supervisor

Producer

Year	Film	Director	Notes
1990	Silent Night, Deadly Night 4: Initiation	Brian Yuzna	Associate producer
