= Silent Night, Deadly Night 4: Initiation =

1990 film by Brian Yuzna

- Promotional release poster
- Directed by: Brian Yuzna
- Screenplay by: Woody Keith
- Story by: Brian Yuzna; Arthur H. Gorson; S.J. Smith
- Produced by: Richard N. Gladstein
- Starring: Maud Adams; Tommy Hinkley; Allyce Beasley; Clint Howard; Neith Hunter
- Cinematography: Philip Holahan
- Edited by: Peter Teschner
- Music by: Richard Band
- Production company: Silent Films
- Distributed by: LIVE Entertainment
- Release date: November 21, 1990
- Running time: 86 minutes
- Country: United States
- Language: English

Silent Night, Deadly Night 4: Initiation (Note: The film's title is stylized onscreen as Initiation: Silent Night, Deadly Night 4.) is a 1990 American supernatural horror film directed by Brian Yuzna, written by Yuzna, Woody Keith, and Arthur Gorson, and starring Maud Adams, Tommy Hinkley, Allyce Beasley, Clint Howard, and Neith Hunter. It focuses on a Los Angeles newspaper reporter who, while investigating the unexplained death of a woman, becomes entangled with a coven of Lilith-worshipping witches who are preparing her for a ritual on Christmas Eve. The fourth film in the Silent Night, Deadly Night film series, it bears no resemblance to prior installments, as it drops the storyline of the Billy Chapman and Ricky Caldwell characters entirely (despite featuring a killer named Ricky).

The film was developed from a screenplay by Keith, which was reshaped by Yuzna after he was hired to direct the film. Yuzna incorporated additional elements such as the coven's focus on Lilith, as well as many of the insect creatures and visual references to Franz Kafka's The Metamorphosis. Principal photography occurred in Los Angeles in the spring of 1990, with the elaborate special effects crafted by Screaming Mad George.

Silent Night, Deadly Night 4: Initiation was released directly-to-video in the United States by LIVE Entertainment on November 21, 1990. In the United Kingdom, it was released under the alternative title Bugs. It is followed by Silent Night, Deadly Night 5: The Toy Maker (1991).

== Plot ==
Kim Levitt is an aspiring journalist working for the Los Angeles Eye newspaper as a classified ads editor. Her boss, Eli, seems to give all of the men in her office the breaks, including her boyfriend Hank. When a woman is discovered dead on the sidewalk, half-burned into ashes in an apparent case of the spontaneous human combustion, Kim decides to pursue the story on her own without Eli's approval. While investigating, she crosses paths with Fima, a used bookstore proprietor whose shop is in the building the woman jumped from. As a gift, Fima offers Kim a book on feminism and the occult.

Kim has dinner with Hank at his family's house, where Hank's father makes snide remarks about Kim being Jewish. Later at her apartment, Kim begins reading the book Fima gave to her, and finds a chapter on "The Fire of Lilith" depicting a woman engulfed in flames. The next day, Kim arrives at a picnic Fima invited her to, where she meets Katherine Harrison, a self-described old crone, and the young Jane Yanana. They tell her about Lilith, Adam's first wife and the "spirit of all that crawls."

At the office, Eli, instead of being angry about Kim missing work, lets her officially have the spontaneous combustion story. That afternoon, Kim decides to visit Fima's apartment to ask her more questions. Fima serves her a cup of tea, which makes Kim nauseated. Fima tells Kim of her daughter Lilith. Fima offers her a date and demands that Kim eat it. She does, even though it looks like a roach in her hand. Soon after, Kim loses consciousness.

She wakes up surrounded by Jane, Fima, Katherine, and Li. They perform a ritual on Kim: Ricky and Fima slice open a live rat over her, and insert a giant larva into Kim's vagina. It emerges from her mouth as a full-grown, giant, multi-segmented roach; she vomits the creature out. Ricky slices the creature in half and drips its innards onto Kim's face. Kim wakes up later fully dressed, still in Fima's apartment. She rushes home, terrified, and finds Hank, who is able to calm her. Ricky then enters the apartment and stabs Hank to death. Kim manages to answer her ringing phone during the fight and screams for her co-worker Janice to help her. Ricky captures Kim and binds her. Janice arrives, but doesn't help Kim. Instead, she admonishes Ricky for the mess and tells him to take Kim straight to Fima.

Ricky locks Kim in the meat locker at a meat shop next-door to Fima's bookstore where she loses consciousness again. When she awakens, she is surrounded by the entire cult. Ricky, wearing a phallic mask, rapes Kim. She reawakens alone in the meat locker; her fingers bind themselves together in a knot. She then experiences incredible pain as her legs bind together into an insect-like tail before losing consciousness. She awakens in the meat locker as Jo opens the door. He frees her legs from a brittle cocoon-like substance and covers her as best as he can. Jo tells her that she has been initiated and that she should leave.

Kim brings a policeman, Detective Burt, to her apartment. There, everything is spotless and there is no trace of Hank's body, leading Kim to question her sanity. At the newspaper's Christmas party, Kim confronts Eli about Hank's whereabouts, and he claims that Hank is away on an assignment. Janice is there, and welcomes her "to the family." Furious and confused, Kim storms out of the office. On the sidewalk, she notices Ricky following her and ducks into a motel room. Her feet begin to get painfully hot. She jumps into the shower, but they still burst into tiny flames. Ricky enters the room and, in pain, Kim agrees to kidnap Hank's teenaged brother Lonnie to complete the initiation.

On Christmas Eve, Kim lures Lonnie out of his house, and Ricky murders Hank's parents by strangling them with Christmas lights, then setting the house on fire. On the building roof, Kim is asked to stab Lonnie; instead, she stabs Fima. In anger, Fima pulls the knife from her stomach and stabs Ricky who tried to block her from stabbing Kim. A giant larva feeds on Ricky, as Kim's legs begin to get hot. Kim's hands knot themselves together once again, then they start to burst into flame. Kim then stabs her fused hands into Fima's wound. This transfers the curse of Lilith to Fima, and Fima dives off the roof just as her daughter had.

== Cast ==
- Neith Hunter as Kim Levitt
- Maud Adams as Fima
- Tommy Hinkley as Hank
- Reggie Bannister as Eli
- Allyce Beasley as Janice
- Clint Howard as Ricky Baker
- Hugh Fink as Jeff
- Richard N. Gladstein as Woody
- Glen Chin as Jo
- Jeanne Bates as Katherine
- Laurel Lockhart as Ann
- Ben Slack as Gus
- Conan Yuzna as Lonnie
- Marjean Holden as Jane
- Ilsa Setzoil as Li
- David Wells as Detective Burt

== Production ==
=== Development ===
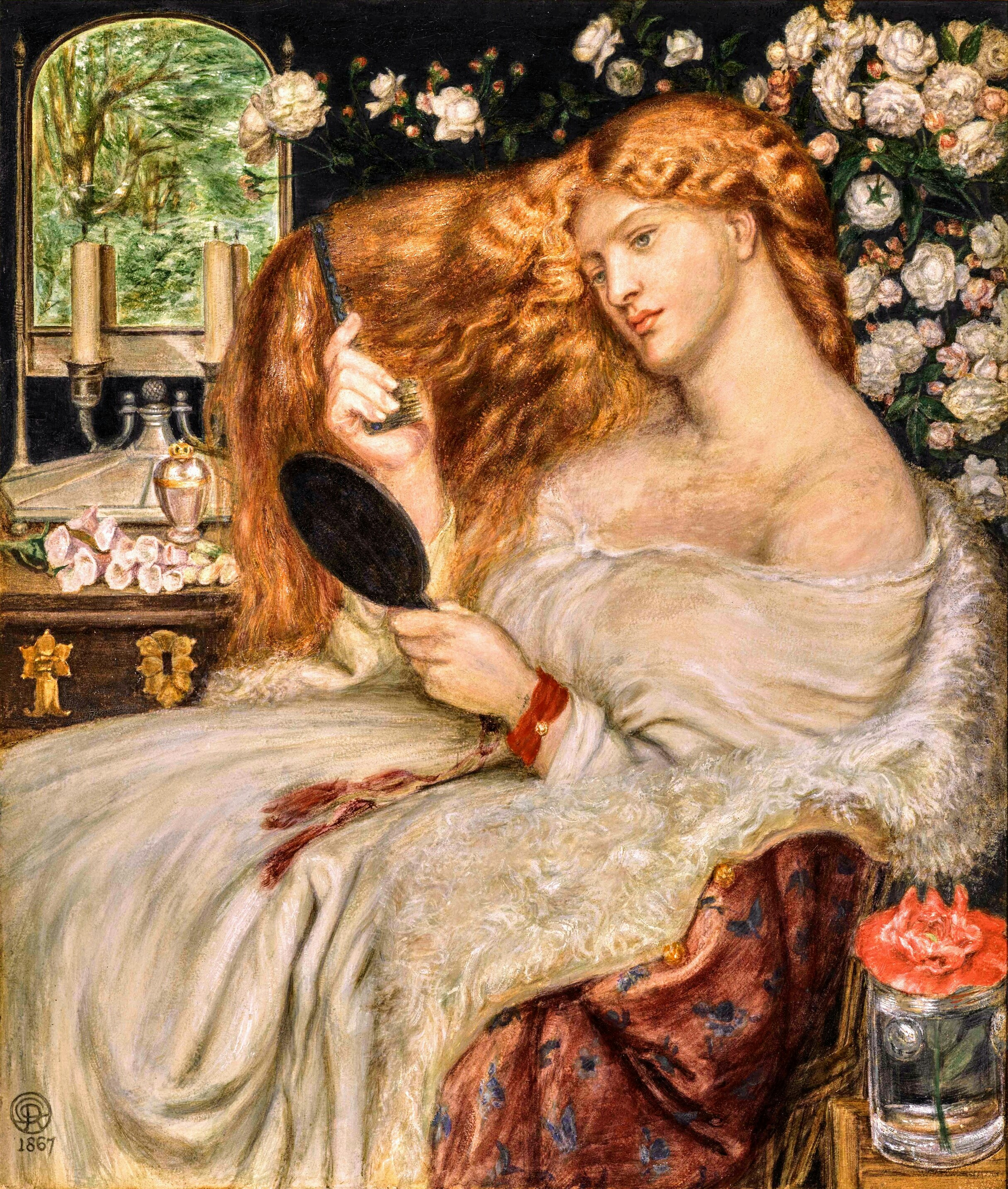
Lady Lilith by Dante Gabriel Rossetti, a portrait of the figure worshipped by the coven in the film

Director Brian Yuzna was approached to direct the fourth movie in the Silent Night, Deadly Night film series in 1989 by LIVE Entertainment, who had previously acquired distribution rights to his second directorial feature, Bride of Re-Animator (1990). Screenwriter Woody Keith, with whom Yuzna had collaborated in the past, had already devised a screenplay centered around a journalist who becomes entrenched in a coven of witches during Christmastime. Yuzna agreed to direct the project, and reworked the screenplay with Keith, introducing the subplot which has the coven devoted to the Biblical figure of Lilith, the first wife of Adam and a demon who was banished from the Garden of Eden, and who later became a figure of women's liberation in the feminist movement of the late-20th century.

Yuzna sought to present the protagonist of Kim as an analog of the Lilith figure, as her character is largely controlled by the men in her life, and she finds independence after encountering the coven; however, her eventual initiation into the coven proves to be nefarious and oppressive in and of itself, and merely another situation "from which she needs to free herself as well."

Stylistically and narratively, the film departs significantly from the Christmas-themed slasher elements of the previous three films, which focused on serial killer Bill Chapman, who went on a murder rampage while dressed in a Santa Claus costume. Yuzna stated that, at the time, he was "not interested" in highlighting the Christmas elements of the previous films, though he later regretted it and "tried to atone for it" by producing the series' following sequel, Silent Night, Deadly Night 5: The Toy Maker (1991). He explained the film's lack of focus on the Christmas holiday as being due to the pre-existing screenplay that had been conceived without his involvement, commenting: "To a certain degree, I just didn't know how to pull all these different elements together."

=== Casting ===
LIVE Entertainment pushed for the casting of Maud Adams as the coven leader, Fima, based on her identifiability for her portrayal of two Bond girls in The Man with the Golden Gun (1974) and Octopussy (1983). Clint Howard was cast as the coven's henchman Ricky, while model Neith Hunter auditioned for the lead role of Kim. Hunter had previously had minor appearances in the films Born in East L.A. (1987), Near Dark (1987), and Less than Zero (also 1987), and Silent Night, Deadly Night 4: Initiation marked her first major leading role.

=== Filming ===
Silent Night, Deadly Night 4: Initiation was shot in Los Angeles in the spring of 1990 over approximately 18 days, with principal photography completing on April 15, 1990. The sequences that occur at Hank's parents' home were filmed in an empty house in the escrow process in West Covina. Yuzna intentionally incorporated visual elements throughout of simulacra, optical illusions in which images or shapes of objects can be representative of something else depending upon the viewer's perspective; among these are images of a water stain on a ceiling resembling a face, as well as twigs from a tree branch resembling a face. These images were intended to give the film a "surreal" appearance and the sense of a "bending of reality" as the lead character's story arc progresses.

Due to a camera malfunction discovered in the dailies after principal photography had wrapped, several key sequences had to be reshot, including the film's finale that occurs on the rooftop of a building. Because the production's leasing of the building had expired, filming of this sequence took place on a soundstage with an artificial constructed rooftop.

=== Special effects ===
The film's special effects, which prominently feature oversized mutated beetles and worm-like creatures, were designed by effects artist Screaming Mad George.

Some of the film's bug effects, primarily the depiction of the oversized cockroach, were inspired by Franz Kafka's The Metamorphosis.

== Release ==
=== Home media ===
The film was released directly to video on November 21, 1990. It subsequently screened on Cinemax on December 31, 1990.

In December 2009, it was released on DVD for the first time as part of a triple-feature with Better Watch Out! and The Toy Maker by Lions Gate Entertainment.

On December 13, 2022, Silent Night, Deadly Night 4: Initiation was released in a Blu-ray box set with Silent Night, Dead Night 3: Better Watch Out! and Silent Night, Deadly Night 5: The Toy Maker through Lionsgate's Vestron Video Collector's Series.

== Reception ==
=== Critical response ===
Jeffrey Jonsson of The Daily Utah Chronicle referred to the film as "quite putrid" and criticized it for its disconnection from the series' previous films, adding that it was not worth seeking out "unless you have a thing for big, slimey devil-worms".

In a contemporary review, Variety described the film as "impressive, disturbing entertainment" and that "Thanks to the imaginative effects of Screaming Mad George...[the effects are] hard to watch but just what modern horror fans crave". The review noted that Neith Hunter "makes a very strong impression here in an uninhibited performance".

Online magazine Flickering Myth called the film an "anti-Christmas" movie and likened it to Halloween III: Season of the Witch (1982) because of its lack of relation to the former films in the series. Its special effects and use of bugs also drew comparisons to The Fly (1986).

== Sequel ==
A sequel titled Silent Night, Deadly Night 5: The Toy Maker, was released in 1991.

== Sources ==
- DuPée, Matthew C. (2022). A Scary Little Christmas: A History of Yuletide Horror Films, 1972-2020. Jefferson, North Carolina: McFarland. ISBN 978-1-476-64540-7.
- Prouty, Howard H., ed. (1994). Variety Television Reviews 1923-1992. Garland Publishing Inc. ISBN 0-8240-3796-0.
- Towlson, Jon (2014). Subversive Horror Cinema: Countercultural Messages of Films from Frankenstein to the Present. Jefferson, North Carolina: McFarland & Company. ISBN 978-0-78647-469-1.
- Yuzna, Brian; Felsher, Michael (2022). Silent Night, Deadly Night 4: Initiation (Blu-ray audio commentary). Vestron Video.
