= Richard N. Gladstein =

American film producer

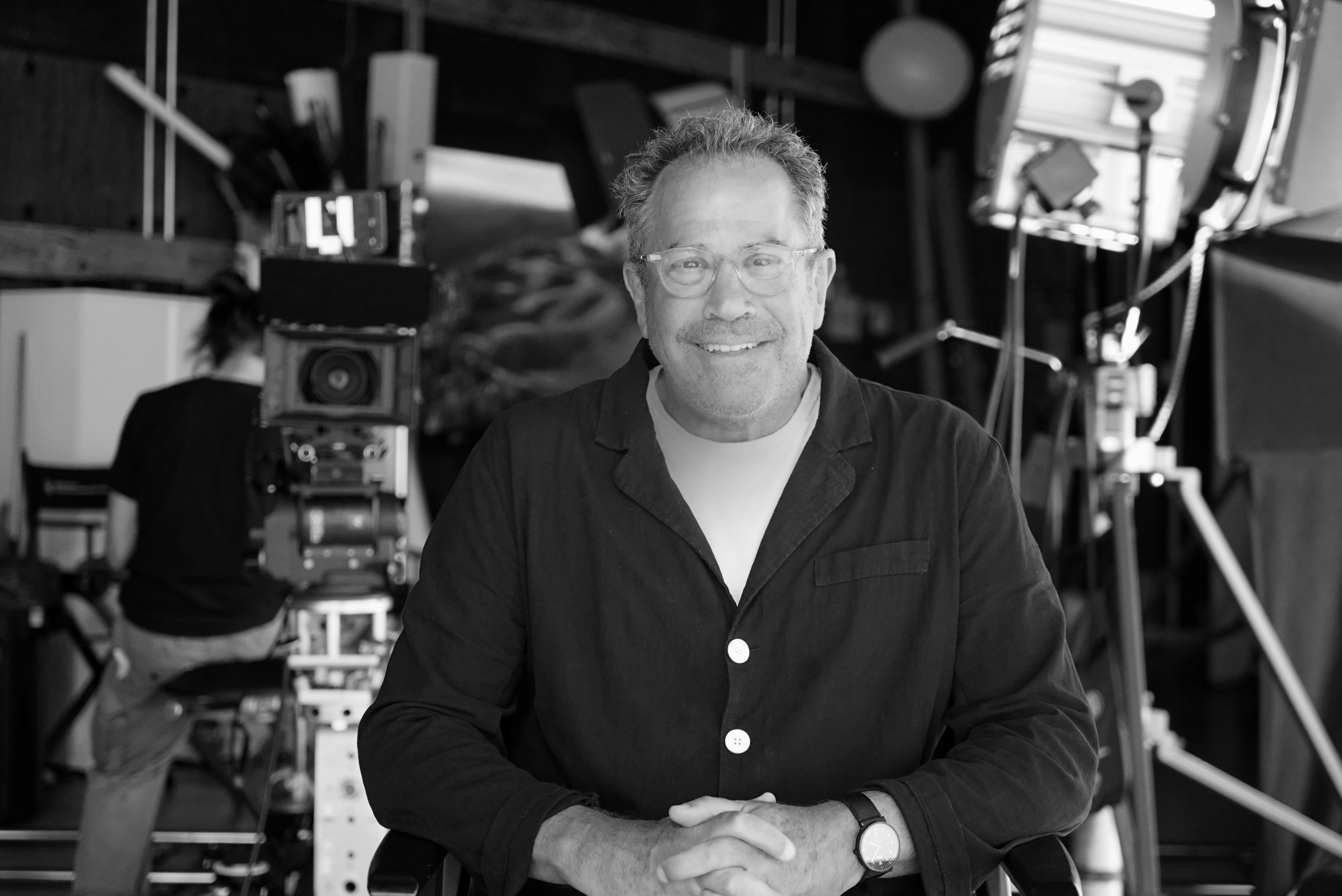
- Richard N. Gladstein in 2024
- Born: New York City, New York, U.S.
- Occupation: Film producer
- Children: 2

Richard N. Gladstein is a two-time Academy Award nominated film producer. His production company is FilmColony. He served as the Dean of the American Film Institute Conservatory and Executive Director of the Feirstein Graduate School of Cinema at Brooklyn College.

== Biography ==
Gladstein received his bachelor's degree in film from Boston University's College of Communication. From 1993 through 1995, he served as executive vice president of production for Miramax Films after which he founded his own production company, FilmColony. His films include The Hateful Eight, Finding Neverland, The Bourne Identity, Pulp Fiction, She's All That, Reservoir Dogs, Hurlyburly, and The Cider House Rules among others. He received Academy Award nominations for both Finding Neverland (2004) and The Cider House Rules (2000).

== Personal life ==
He founded The Bloom's Syndrome Foundation which is dedicated toward medical research on Bloom's Syndrome, an Ashkenazi Jewish genetic disease with which his son was diagnosed in 2004.

== Filmography ==
He was a producer in all films unless otherwise noted.

=== Film ===
Year	Film	Credit	Notes
1989	Silent Night, Deadly Night 3: Better Watch Out!	Executive producer	Direct-to-video
1990	Silent Night, Deadly Night 4: Initiation		Direct-to-video
1991	Lonely Hearts	Executive producer	
1991	Silent Night, Deadly Night 5: The Toy Maker		Direct-to-video
1992	Reservoir Dogs	Executive producer	
1992	Only You	Executive producer	
1992	Dark Horse	Executive producer	
1993	A House in the Hills	Executive producer	
1993	The Young Americans	Executive producer	
1994	Pulp Fiction	Co-executive producer	
1995	The Crossing Guard	Executive producer	
1995	The Journey of August King	Executive producer	
1997	Jackie Brown	Executive producer	
1998	54		
1998	Hurlyburly		
1999	She's All That		
1999	The Cider House Rules		
2002	The Bourne Identity		
2003	Levity		
2003	Duplex	Executive producer	
2004	Finding Neverland		
2006	Journey to the End of the Night		
2007	The Nanny Diaries		
2007	Mr. Magorium's Wonder Emporium		Nominated for a BAFTA Award for Best British Film
2008	Killshot		
2009	Paper Man		
2012	The Time Being		
2013	Expecting	Executive producer	
2015	The Hateful Eight		
2017	Last Call		

As an actor

Year	Film	Role	Notes
1989	Silent Night, Deadly Night 3: Better Watch Out!	Detective	Direct-to-video
1990	Silent Night, Deadly Night 4: Initiation	Woody	Direct-to-video
1991	Silent Night, Deadly Night 5: The Toy Maker	Driver Dad	Direct-to-video

As writer

Year	Film	Notes
1990	Silent Night, Deadly Night 4: Initiation	Direct-to-video
2012	The Time Being	

Thanks

Year	Film	Role	Notes
1991	Drop Dead Fred	Thanks	
1993	Frauds	The producers would like to thank	
1999	From Dusk Till Dawn 3: The Hangman's Daughter	Special thanks	Direct-to-video

=== Television ===
Year	Title	Credit	Notes
1993	Beyond the Law	Executive producer	Television film
1998	Since You've Been Gone		Television film

== Trivia ==
In a 1994 interview with Charlie Rose, Quentin Tarantino states that he owes his career to Gladstein.

[Gladstein] was the guy at the company (...) that, like, said: "I'm gonna take a chance on this kid", you know. I really owe my career to him.
