= Kim Levitt =

- Silent Night, Deadly Night character
- Neith Hunter as Kim Levitt in Silent Night, Deadly Night 4: Initiation
- Created by: Brian Yuzna; Arthur Gorson; S.J. Smith
- Portrayed by: Neith Hunter

In-universe information
- Gender: Female
- Occupation: Editor, journalist
- Family: Hank (boyfriend)
- Nationality: American

Kim Levitt is a fictional character in the Silent Night, Deadly Night film series. Created by Brian Yuzna, Arthur Gorson, and S.J. Smith, she is an editor for the fictional classified ads paper the L.A. Eye. She is first introduced in the fourth installment in the series, Silent Night, Deadly Night 4: Initiation (1990), as the protagonist of the film who finds herself enmeshed with a cult of witches while investigating the mysterious spontaneous combustion death of a woman.

She is later featured in Silent Night, Deadly Night 5: The Toy Maker in a supporting role as a friend of the protagonist's mother, Sarah Quinn.

== Appearances ==
Kim first appears in Silent Night, Deadly Night 4: Initiation, working in Los Angeles, California as an editor and aspiring journalist for the L.A. Eye. When she hears of a potential spontaneous combustion death of a woman who leapt from a building rooftop, she begins her own investigative work in spite of her boss Eli's demands. She meets Fima, a book store proprietor in the building where the victim leapt from; Fima gives her a book as a gift, which tells of feminine occultism and worship of Lilith. Meanwhile, Kim begins to notice her apartment has become infested with cockroaches.

After spending Christmas Eve with her boyfriend Hank's antisemitic family, Kim returns home and continues to read the book; she inexplicably becomes violently ill and blacks out, missing an entire day of work. She later attends a picnic of Fima's, where she meets a series of women who are part of an apparent cult. While at Fima's apartment, Kim is drugged and awakens to Fima, the women, and a male transient, Ricky, performing a ritual on her: They paint her body, and insert a giant larvae-like creature inside her vagina, which she then vomits out of her mouth. The larva is cut in half, and its entrails are poured over her head. She awakens in Fima's apartment, fully dressed, and returns home, terrified.

At her apartment, she is comforted by Hank, but Ricky breaks into the apartment and kills Hank with a butcher knife. Kim's co-worker, Janice, arrives at the apartment, and is revealed to be a cult member herself. Ricky takes Kim to a local Chinese meat market next-door to Fima's bookstore, and locks her in the meat cooler there. Inside, Kim experiences bizarre hallucinations and witnesses her hands contorting together, and her legs twisting into a spiral. She loses consciousness again, and awakens to Ricky raping her as the entire cult watches. After the ordeal, Kim returns home and calls a police detective to her apartment, but they find no trace of Hank's body.

When confronted by Ricky, Kim agrees to acquiesce to the cult's wishes, which entail an initiation ritual in which a human sacrifice must take place; they ask her to kidnap Hank's younger brother, Lonnie, to be sacrificed. Kim and Ricky arrive at Hank's parents' house, where Ricky kills Hank's mother and strangles his father to death with Christmas lights before setting the house on fire. They bring the teenaged Lonnie to the rooftop above Fima's store, where the cult has gathered, but instead of stabbing Lonnie, Kim attacks Fima, stabbing the knife into her stomach. Kim's hands again begin to contort and fuse together, and she uses them to impale Fima's wound in her stomach, killing her; Fima then lights on fire, and leaps from the building's rooftop to her death. The cult flees, and Kim and Lonnie escape to safety.

In Silent Night, Deadly Night 5: The Toy Maker, Kim appears as the friend of Sarah, the child protagonist's mother. Kim visits Sarah at her home, bringing Lonnie with her, who she has now adopted. Lonnie is hospitalized after using a pair of roller skates given to him as a gift that contain rockets in them, causing him to lose control.

== Reception ==
Contemporary critics have read the character of Kim as comparable to that of the titular character in Rosemary's Baby (1968). Treated unequally in her workplace by her male co-workers (particularly her chauvinist boss, Eli), she has been read as a feminist character; yet she triumphs over evil by refusing to commit the sacrifice of a male (Lonnie) as an initiation into the witches' cult.
