= Voices of Light =

1994 musical composition by Richard Einhorn

Voices of Light is a 1994 musical composition by Richard Einhorn. It was inspired by the silent film The Passion of Joan of Arc (1928), directed by Carl Theodor Dreyer; live performances of the composition have accompanied screenings of the film. The libretto is based on excerpts from a variety of ancient writings, most of it from medieval female mystics. The text incorporates accusations from Joan of Arc's actual contemporary accusers. The language of this work is a mix of Latin and Middle French.

It is scored for a small orchestra, chorus, and soloists.

== Background ==
In the 1980s, Richard Einhorn was developing a large piece on a religious subject when a friend suggested Joan of Arc as the subject. While sifting through the archives of the Museum of Modern Art, he found a still from the movie The Passion of Joan of Arc. After watching the film, he set to work on the entire piece.

In preparation, Einhorn visited her hometown of Domrémy-la-Pucelle in France. According to a 2017 interview with the Criterion channel, Richard Einhorn visited the church where she prayed which is still standing, located near her home. He took along a recorder and recorded the sound of the church bells. These bells are relevant to her story as Joan said the bells triggered the voices from the angels. The bells that can be heard in the original recording are these very bells from her church the way they would have sounded to her.

The piece uses a multi-layered approach intended to resemble the polyphonic music of Joan's own time. The first layer is the slowed down Gregorian chant. A one minute chant now becomes fifteen minutes. There are multiple texts then sung over the slowed down chant. This creates the polyphony.

The piece premiered in February 1994 as live accompaniment to the Dreyer film at the Academy of Music in Northampton, Massachusetts, performed by the Arcadia Players and the Da Camera Singers under the direction of Margaret Irwin-Brandon.

== Release ==
An album was released in 1995 which featured the Netherlands Radio Philharmonic Orchestra and the Netherlands Radio Choir, the former conducted by Steven Mercurio, the vocals of Anonymous 4, Susan Narucki, Corrie Pronk, Frank Hameleers and Henk van Heijnsbergen. It totals 14 tracks and contains a 28-page booklet further detailing the background and history of the pieces.

When the Criterion Collection released the film on DVD, they included as an audio option a specially edited performance - using the 1995 recording - of the oratorio as a soundtrack accompanying the film.
