= The Origin (Einhorn) =

The Origin is an opera/oratorio composed by Richard Einhorn to a libretto by Richard Einhorn and Catherine Barnett based on the writings of Charles Darwin. The oratorio takes its title from Darwin's 1859 On the Origin of Species. The work was commissioned by the Artswego program and the Music Department of State University of New York at Oswego for the worldwide Darwin Bicentennial. The Origin had its world premiere on 6 February 2009 at the university's Waterman Theatre.

== Premiere performance ==
The premiere performance of The Origin was conducted by Julie Pretzat and featured soprano Jacqueline Horner from the a cappella quartet, Anonymous 4; tenor Todd Graber; bass Eric Johnson; the women's vocal ensemble, Kitka; the SUNY Oswego College Choir; Oswego College-Community Orchestra; and the Oswego Festival Chorus. Of the over 200 performers, about 80 were students at SUNY Oswego. The projected video images which served as a backdrop to the performance were by filmmaker Bill Morrison.
