= Aubrey Bradimore =

Fictional character

- Silent Night, Deadly Night character
- Jaime King as Aubrey Bradimore in Silent Night
- Created by: Jayson Rothwell
- Portrayed by: Jaime King

In-universe information
- Gender: Female
- Occupation: Police officer
- Children: Ricky Bradimore
- Nationality: American

Aubrey Bradimore is a fictional character in the Silent Night, Deadly Night franchise. Created by Jayson Rothwell, she is a police officer in a small Midwestern town who finds herself hunting a killer dressed in a Santa Claus suit on Christmas Eve. Portrayed by Jaime King, the character is first introduced in Silent Night (2012), a loose remake of the original Silent Night, Deadly Night (1984).

== Appearances ==
Aubrey first appears in Silent Night. After a series of murders have occurred in the days leading up to Christmas, Aubrey, a police officer in the fictional small town of Cryer, Wisconsin, is assigned to track the killer with the help of Sheriff Cooper. Aubrey suffers from emotional issues over the death of her father, Hank, a former police officer.

On Christmas Eve, Aubrey is called into work when her co-worker, Deputy Jordan, doesn't arrive at the police station for his shift. Aubrey goes to his house to check in on him, and finds both he and his girlfriend murdered. At the town's annual Santa Claus costume contest, Aubrey searches furiously for the killer, who is also dressed as Santa. Aubrey is able to corner the killer at the police station, and defeats him with a flamethrower.

It is discovered that the killer, Ronald Jones, Jr., survived the flamethrower attack and was the son of a criminal who was shot to death by Hank and Jr. decided to punish naughty people and be a killer Santa too and to get revenge on Hank for killing his father.

== Reception ==
The Hollywood Reporter praised the character, calling her "plucky", while Jason Adams of JoBlo.com wrote that the character was "likable as the heroine despite being saddled with the straight and serious role".

Other responses were less laudatory; in a review on Den of Geek, David Crow wrote: "King tries her hardest to keep the movie afloat. She believably portrays a woman haunted by a past mistake that she wants to make amends for. However, her talent is wasted in a movie that only uses her as a bridge between set pieces".
