= Silent Night, Deadly Night 5: The Toy Maker =

1991 film by Martin Kitrosser

- Promotional release poster
- Directed by: Martin Kitrosser
- Written by: Martin Kitrosser; Brian Yuzna
- Produced by: Richard N. Gladstein; Brian Yuzna
- Starring: William Thorne; Jane Higginson; Tracy Fraim; Brian Bremer; Mickey Rooney
- Cinematography: James Mathers
- Edited by: Norman Buckley
- Music by: Matthew Morse
- Distributed by: Still Silent Films
- Release date: November 7, 1991
- Running time: 87 minutes
- Country: United States
- Language: English

Silent Night, Deadly Night 5: The Toy Maker (also known simply as The Toy Maker) is a 1991 American science fiction horror film directed by Martin Kitrosser and stars Mickey Rooney, who had previously condemned the original film. It is the fifth film in the Silent Night, Deadly Night film series. Additionally, Neith Hunter, Clint Howard and Conan Yuzna, who played Kim Levitt, Ricky Baker and Lonnie in the previous film, make cameo appearances.

== Plot ==
Late one night in December, a young boy named Derek Quinn finds a Christmas present addressed to him on the porch. His father Tom opens the gift and finds a musical orb shaped like Santa Claus; he activates it, causing it to strangle him with retractable cords. As Tom struggles, he slips and falls onto a fireplace poker, his impaled body being found by his wife Sarah a few moments later.

Two weeks later, Sarah takes Derek, who has been mute since his father's death, to a toy store owned by the elderly Joe Petto, a World War II veteran, and his odd son Pino, not realizing Noah Adams, a recently discharged fellow soldier, has followed them. After Derek rejects all the toys shown to him, Derek and his mother leave, prompting Joe to angrily yell at Pino, blaming him for the store's recent failures. While running from his father, Pino bumps into Noah, who buys some toys before leaving. At his home, Noah begins taking apart the toys to inspect their mechanics when he is confronted by his landlord Harold. Late paying rent, Noah gives Harold a Larry the Larvae toy in exchange for a one-day extension. While driving home, Harold is killed when Larry the Larvae crawls into his mouth and bursts out his eye.

The next day, Derek finds another gift on his porch before his mother takes him to a mall Santa (portrayed by Noah, who had taken his friend's shift) Meanwhile, Pino sneaks into their house, but when Sarah and Derek get home early (due to Noah's odd behavior), Pino flees. Sarah confronts Joe about Pino's intrusion, and later decides to let Derek open the present dropped off earlier, but Derek refuses.

Sarah is visited by her friend Kim, and Derek sneaks outside and throws the present in a garbage while they talk. However, Kim's adopted son Lonnie opens the gift and finds roller skates in it. While using the skates, Lonnie is hit by a car and left hospitalized when rockets hidden within the skates cause him to lose control. In a drunken rage, Joe begins beating Pino, accidentally killing him by knocking him down some stairs.

Noah argues with Sarah at a parking garage and is revealed to be Sarah's old boyfriend and Derek's biological father, and the two reconcile. At Sarah’s house, Derek’s babysitter Meridith and her boyfriend Buck have sex when Joe has a horde of toys attack them. Sarah and Noah arrive and find a bloody Meridith, who tells them Buck is dead and that Joe has abducted Derek, taking him to the toy store. Noah tells Sarah about Joe's past, saying he was arrested years earlier for booby-trapping toys he gave to children after his pregnant wife died in a car crash.

Sarah and Noah rush to the toy store. Joe attacks Noah with a remote control plane and an acid-squirting water pistol, knocking him out. Hearing the noise, Sarah goes downstairs, finds the toys and Joe reveals he is actually Pino, a robot. Pino explains to Sarah that Joe created him to replace his dead son and was continually broken and rebuilt by Joe in his drunken rages. Pino sexually assaults Sarah who stabs him in the head with a screwdriver. Pino says he wants to kill Derek and replace him. Noah arrives and the couple destroy Pino.

As Sarah, Derek, and Noah exit, the eyes of one of Joe's partially assembled robots spark ominously.

== Cast ==
- William Thorne as Derek Quinn
- Jane Higginson as Sarah Quinn
- Tracy Fraim as Noah Adams
- Brian Bremer as Pino Petto / Joe Petto
- Mickey Rooney as Joe Petto
- Neith Hunter as Kim Levitt
- Conan Yuzna as Lonnie
- Gerry Black as Harold
- Clint Howard as Ricky Baker
- Van Quattro as Tom Quinn
- Thornton Simmons as Other Santa
- Catherine Schreiber as Mother
- Zoe Yuzna as Brandy
- Jennifer Pusheck as Elf
- Billy Oscar as Dad
- Cathy Yuzna as Stroller #1
- Gary Schmoeller as Stroller #2
- Amy L. Taylor as Merideth
- Eric Welch as Buck
- Richard N. Gladstein as Driver Dad
- Jan Linder as Nurse

== Release ==
=== Home media ===
The film was released on VHS by Live Home Video in November 1991.

The film was released on DVD December 1, 2009 by Lionsgate in a box set with Silent Night, Deadly Night 3: Better Watch Out! and Silent Night, Deadly Night 4: Initiation.

On December 13, 2022, Silent Night, Deadly Night 5: The Toy Maker was released in a Blu-ray box set with Silent Night, Dead Night 3: Better Watch Out! and Silent Night, Deadly Night 4: Initiation through Lionsgate's Vestron Video Collector's Series.

== Reception ==
=== Critical response ===
JoBlo.com and Flickering Myth both gave the film favorable reviews, with Flickering Myth stating that while the film was not great, "The acting is of a level you’d expect, the story has some good twists and turns and it has an ending that will stay with you for a few days after the credits roll. To be honest, it’s worth watching just to see the ending". Bloody Disgusting also praised The Toy Maker, commenting that the film's bizarre scenes made it "one of the most fun horror sequels of all time, and the film is quite frankly the embodiment of everything that’s great about the fusion of horror and the most joyful holiday of them all".

In contrast, Tim Brayton of Antagony & Ecstasy wrote: "Junky direct-to-video pap, and only the fact that it does, for a brief spell, involve a murderous Santa Claus gives it any sort of leg up over the other films in its series".

== See also ==
- Killer Toys
