= The Time Being =

- Theatrical release poster
- Directed by: Nenad Cicin-Sain
- Written by: Nenad Cicin-Sain; Richard N. Gladstein
- Produced by: Richard N. Gladstein
- Starring: Wes Bentley; Frank Langella; Ahna O'Reilly; Sarah Paulson; Corey Stoll; Gina Gallego
- Cinematography: Mihai Mălaimare Jr.
- Edited by: Haines Hall; Evan Schiff
- Music by: Jan A. P. Kaczmarek
- Production company: FilmColony
- Distributed by: Tribeca Film
- Release dates: September 11, 2012 (TIFF); July 23, 2013 (United States)
- Running time: 87 minutes
- Country: United States
- Language: English

The Time Being is a 2012 American mystery film directed by Nenad Cicin-Sain, written by Nenad Cicin-Sain and Richard N. Gladstein, and starring Wes Bentley, Frank Langella, Ahna O'Reilly, Sarah Paulson, Corey Stoll and Gina Gallego. It was released on July 23, 2013, by Tribeca Film.

== Cast ==
- Wes Bentley as Daniel
- Frank Langella as Warner Dax
- Ahna O'Reilly as Olivia
- Sarah Paulson as Sarah
- Corey Stoll as Eric
- Gina Gallego as Anjelica
- Jeremy Allen White as Gus
- Mila Brener as Winona
- Aiden Lovekamp as Marco
- Ivan Shaw as Officer
- Sandra Seacat as Annette
- Megan Kuhlmann as Nurse
- Thurn Hoffman as Henry

== Release ==
The film premiered at the 2012 Toronto International Film Festival on September 11, 2012. The film was released on July 23, 2013, by Tribeca Film.
