= Return of the Living Dead Part II =

1988 film by Ken Wiederhorn

- Theatrical release poster
- Directed by: Ken Wiederhorn
- Written by: Ken Wiederhorn
- Produced by: Tom Fox
- Starring: James Karen; Thom Mathews; Dana Ashbrook; Marsha Dietlein Bennett; Phil Bruns; Michael Kenworthy
- Cinematography: Robert Elswit
- Edited by: Charles Bornstein
- Music by: J. Peter Robinson
- Distributed by: Lorimar Motion Pictures
- Release date: January 15, 1988
- Running time: 89 minutes
- Country: United States
- Language: English
- Budget: $6 million
- Box office: $9.2 million

Return of the Living Dead Part II is a 1988 American comedy horror film written and directed by Ken Wiederhorn, and starring Michael Kenworthy, Marsha Dietlein, Dana Ashbrook, Thom Mathews, James Karen, and Phil Bruns. It is the first of four sequels to The Return of the Living Dead.

Return of the Living Dead Part II was released by Lorimar Motion Pictures on January 15, 1988, and was a minor box office success, making over $9 million at the box office in the United States against its $6.2 million budget.

== Plot ==
Set some time after the events at the UNEEDA Warehouse in Louisville, KY, a U.S. military truck is transporting barrels of Trioxin, when one breaks loose and falls into a river without the driver noticing. The next morning, pre-teen bullies Johnny and Billy Crowley take a reluctant Jesse Wilson to a cemetery mausoleum for an initiation into their club. Frightened, Jesse flees into a nearby storm drain, where the three stumble across the rogue barrel. Upon opening it, they find a corpse inside and run away screaming as the toxic gas contained within begins to leak out. When Jesse proposes calling the Army from a phone number listed on the barrel, the bullies trap and leave him in the derelict mausoleum.

Billy and Johnny return to the barrel and open it, releasing the Trioxin gas that begins to permeate the whole cemetery. Grave robbers Ed Mathews and Joey Hazel, along with Joey's girlfriend Brenda Herzog, arrive at the cemetery in a van. While Brenda stays behind in the van, Ed and Joey open the mausoleum to loot the tombs within, allowing Jesse to run home. Meanwhile, acid rainfall causes the Trioxin to begin seeping into the ground and reanimating the corpses.

At home, Jesse is ordered to do his homework by his older sister, Lucy. However, Jesse sneaks out when a cable repairman, Tom Essex, arrives at the house. Jesse goes to Billy's house, where Billy has fallen ill. Suffering from the effects of Trioxin, Billy warns Jesse not to tell anyone what they found. Jesse returns to the sewer to examine the barrel. Upon seeing a tar-covered zombie, Jesse flees to the cemetery, where the newly resurrected bodies begin to dig their way out of the ground. In the mausoleum, Ed and Joey witness a corpse come to life. Joey strikes its head with a crowbar, and they flee the building. They run into a hysterical Brenda as a mob of zombies grows.

Jesse gets home and tries to tell Lucy about the zombie uprising, but she dismisses him and locks him in his room. He starts a fire to set off the smoke alarm, which distracts Lucy so he can escape. Jesse calls the Army and gets through to Colonel Horace Glover, but the call gets disconnected. Ed, Joey, and Brenda steal Tom's van but are unable to get through the zombie horde, so they barge into Jesse's house. Joey begins to fall ill from Trioxin exposure. As the zombies close in on the house, the survivors attempt to find a getaway car. They manage to break into a doctor's house, where they convince him to let them use his car, and they drive to a hospital emergency room that appears to be deserted.

At Billy's house, Billy's father is attacked and eaten by zombies. Fully turned, Billy proceeds to attack his mother. Elsewhere, Tom, Lucy, and Jesse drive through the town—which has apparently been abandoned—to Lucy and Jesse's grandfather's house, where they arm themselves with guns. They return to the hospital where Ed and Joey are experiencing symptoms of rigor mortis. Jesse is attacked by a zombie that both he and Tom shot multiple times. The group, including Joey and Ed, leave in the car and come across National Guardsmen. A fully zombified Ed attacks and kills one of the soldiers, causing his squadmates to flee. Brenda drives away with Joey, leaving Ed behind. Brenda is attacked by a zombified Joey and willfully lets him cannibalize her.

Fleeing in a stolen ambulance, the survivors come to a roadblock, and the National Guard opens fire on them, thinking they are zombies. Realizing that the whole town has been evacuated, Tom drives them to a meat packing plant. They take a truck and distribute brains to the zombies to lure them to a power plant, intending to electrocute them all. Billy opens the gate, but zombies corner them in the truck. The only one to slip out, Jesse activates the plant's power, electrocuting all the zombies. Billy tries to kill Jesse, but Jesse pushes him into a transformer, killing him. Glover and his men arrive to contain the scene and lead the others away.

== Cast ==
- James Karen as Ed Mathews
- Thom Mathews as Joey Hazel
- Marsha Dietlein as Lucy Wilson
- Dana Ashbrook as Tom Essex
- Michael Kenworthy as Jesse Wilson
- Phil Bruns as Doc Mandel
- Suzanne Snyder as Brenda Herzog
- Thor Van Lingen as Billy Crowley
- Jason Hogan as Johnny
- Mitch Pileggi as Sarge
- Jonathan Terry as Colonel Glover
- Sally Smythe as Mildred Crowley
- Don Maxwell as George Crowley
- Forrest J Ackerman as Harvey Kramer
- Allan Trautman as Tarman
- Douglas Benson as High-Pitched Voice Zombie

== Production ==
Following the success of The Return of the Living Dead, producer Tom Fox opted to personally bankroll the sequel believing it to be a safe investment having been inspired by the successful sequelization of other works such as the Friday the 13th film series. Fox hired Ken Wiederhorn to serve as writer and director on the film to make up for Wiederhorn losing the opportunity to direct the Fox produced Dark Tower after a combination of delays in securing financing and personal issues forced Wiederhorn to leave. Fox had initially wanted the sequel to be played as a straightforward horror film, but after Wiederhorn voiced a desire to lean deeper into the humorous elements of the previous Fox allowed the new direction. Fox had stated his intent with the film was to make a long lasting horror series much like Friday the 13th.

Actors James Karen and Thom Mathews, who appeared in The Return of the Living Dead as medical supply warehouse employees Frank and Freddy, respectively, appear again in Return of the Living Dead Part II, although they play different characters than in the first film. Like in the previous film, their characters gradually devolve into zombies after being exposed to toxic gas; during the production of Part II, Mathews remarked to Fangoria that, "This time I get to eat the girl's brains". Matthews recalled in 2016, "I went back because The Return of the Living Dead was such a huge hit in Japan that when they were trying to get financing for Part II, the Japanese requested that Jimmy Karen and I came back in whatever form, almost as the same characters, in Part II. That's the only reason why we came back, because we were requested from the Japanese, because they weren't going to give them the money for the film. It was a huge success in Japan, Part I."

== Soundtrack ==
Released on Island Records in 1988.

1. Space Hopper" by Julian Cope
2. "High Priest of Love" by Zodiac Mindwarp and the Love Reaction
3. "I'm the Man (Def Uncensored version)" by Anthrax
4. "Big Band B-Boy" by Mantronix
5. "Monster Mash" by the Big O (lead vocal by Christian Gossett)
6. "Alone in the Night" by Leatherwolf
7. "A.D.I./Horror of It All" by Anthrax
8. "Flesh to Flesh" by Joe Lamont
9. "The Dead Return" by J. Peter Robinson
- The soundtrack was released in Japan with the additional songs "Looking For Clues" and "Bad Case of Loving You (Doctor, Doctor)" by Robert Palmer.

== Reception ==
On Rotten Tomatoes, the film holds a 13% rating from 31 reviews. On Metacritic it has a rating of 45 based on 6 critic reviews indicating "mixed or average reviews".

== Home media ==
Return of the Living Dead Part II was released on DVD in 2004, containing a heavily altered soundtrack.

Actress Marsha Dietlein was asked in an August 2012 interview if the film would receive a newer and perhaps "special" DVD release, as was recently done for the first installment in the franchise. "I wish they would do a retrospective, but I haven't heard anything about it," she said.

The film received a Blu-ray release in 2018 by Shout! Factory (under license from Warner Bros.). It contains a new 2K scan of the interpositive, plus a host of new special features that were not on the DVD. Along with that, it also restores the original theatrical soundtrack that was omitted on the DVD release.
