= Shock Waves (film) =

1977 horror movie directed by Ken Wiederhorn

- Directed by: Ken Wiederhorn
- Screenplay by: John Harrison; Ken Wiederhorn
- Produced by: Reuben Trane
- Starring: Peter Cushing; Brooke Adams; Fred Buch; Jack Davidson; Luke Halpin; D.J. Sidney; Don Stout; John Carradine
- Cinematography: Reuben Trane
- Edited by: Norman Gay
- Music by: Richard Einhorn
- Production companies: Lawrence Friedricks Enterprises; Zopix Company
- Distributed by: Joseph Brenner Associates
- Release date: 21 September 1977 (Los Angeles)
- Running time: 86 minutes
- Country: United States
- Language: English
- Budget: $200,000

Shock Waves is a 1977 American horror film written and directed by Ken Wiederhorn. The film is about a group of tourists who encounter aquatic Nazi zombies when they become shipwrecked. It stars Peter Cushing as a former SS commander, Brooke Adams as a tourist, and John Carradine as the captain of the tourists' boat.

== Plot ==
A group of tourists are on a small recreational boat. After trouble with the engine, the navigation system goes haywire when they encounter an unusual orange haze. They start sensing that something is wrong. Tourist Norman becomes particularly abrasive. At night, a hulking cargo ship appears and sideswipes their boat. The boat's captain sends up a flare, which lights up the sight of a huge, rotting vessel wrecked nearby.

The next morning, everyone wakes to find the Captain missing. Realizing that the boat is taking on water, everyone evacuates in the lifeboat and makes for a nearby island. They see the huge wreck in the light of day; she appears to have been there for decades, stranded on the island's reef. The group finds the Captain's corpse, apparently drowned while he was trying to check the underside of the boat for damage. They explore the island and discover a rundown hotel. At first they think it is deserted, but eventually discover a reclusive old man living there.

The man seems alarmed by their story, saying that there is no shipwreck on the island. He seems to recognize the name they say was the one they saw on the ship and goes down to the beach to investigate. Under the water, zombie-like men gather, walking from the wreck along the ocean floor to the island. As Dobbs, the boat's cook, gathers items to help prepare food, the zombies corner him in the water; before being killed, Dobbs falls in a cluster of sea urchins and is mangled. Tourist Rose discovers his body while swimming. As they pull the corpse to shore, the boat's first mate Keith finds a piece of torn uniform bearing the insignia of the Nazi SS in his hand.

Inside the hotel, their reluctant host says that he was a Nazi commander in charge of the "Death Corps", a group of zombies designed to be super-soldiers able to thrive in any environment, with his group specialized for aquatic operations. The creatures were intended to be a powerful weapon for the Nazis, but proved too difficult to control, with incidents involving them attacking their own soldiers. When Germany lost the war, he sank their ship and went into exile on the island. With the ship having raised herself from the ocean floor to the reef, he says that the zombies have returned and that they are doomed. The Commander goes down to the beach again and sees zombies off in the distance. He tries to order them to stop, to no avail. He tries to chase them, but they end up drowning him.

The others locate a boat that the Commander mentioned and pilot it out through the streams to the open water. They lose control of the boat, and it sails away from them, empty. A zombie drowns Norman in a stream, and another chases Rose back to the hotel, where she kills it by pulling off its goggles. Tourists Chuck and Beverly, and Keith return to the hotel and barricade themselves in the refrigerator unit. The close quarters and stress cause the survivors to begin infighting, and Chuck accidentally fires a flare gun, blinding Beverly. Keith and Rose escape to an old furnace room and hide inside two metal grates, while Beverly hides in a closet. The zombies drown Chuck in a swimming pool outside.

The next morning, Keith and Rose discover Beverly dead, drowned in a fish tank. Now on their own, they try to escape in a sightseeing rowboat with a glass bottom. The zombies attack, and although Keith defeats one by pulling off its goggles, a second one grabs him and drowns him just as the dinghy breaches the reef and drifts free. Rose sees Keith's corpse pressed up against the glass bottom of the boat and screams.

Two fishermen eventually find Rose. They pull her onto their own boat.

Later, in a hospital bed, Rose seemingly writes in a journal. She begins to repeat herself over and over, and it is revealed that she is writing nonsense in her journal, clearly having gone insane.

== Cast ==
- Peter Cushing as SS Commander
- John Carradine as Captain Ben Morris
- Brooke Adams as Rose
- Fred Buch as Chuck
- Jack Davidson as Norman
- Luke Halpin as Keith
- D. J. Sidney as Beverly
- Don Stout as Dobbs

== Production ==
Prior to making Shock Waves, producer Reuben Trane and director Ken Wiederhorn were students at Columbia University in New York City where they won the 1973 Academy Award for Best Dramatic Student Film. Their next work was filming Shock Waves as their first commercial feature film. Principal photography on the film began in July 1975, shooting in 16mm, which was later blown up to 35mm.

An issue of Cinemagic magazine shows and details the film being shot under the title Death Corps in Miami and West Palm Beach, Florida, in 1975 with a budget of $150,000. The swamp scenes in the film were shot near Miami's Crandon Park. It was later noted in the Los Angeles Times in 1978, that the filmmakers raised $200,000 to complete the film.

According to a 2013 interview, Wiederhorn and Trane made Shock Waves because the investors had one requirement: they wanted a horror movie, because, according to Wiederhorn, "they heard that horror movies have a better chance of making their money back than any other genre". Wiederhorn and Trane then "started spitballing ideas. What’s scary? Since we were going to be filming in Florida, we thought: water can be scary. Then I came across this book called The Morning of the Magicians, which lays out a theory that the Third Reich was heavily into magic, so we thought: Nazi's [sic] always work! So my first movie became a horror movie because the people who put up the money wanted a horror movie."

== Release ==
Shock Waves was shown in Los Angeles on 21 September 1977. The film was released in the United Kingdom as Almost Human.

== Home media ==
In the 1980s, Shock Waves was released on VHS by Prism Entertainment, and later by Starmaker. Burbank Video (distributed by Video Treasures) also released the film on VHS in 1991.

A special edition DVD of the film was issued by Blue Underground in 2003. The DVD was sourced from a print in Wiederhorn's personal collection, as the original negative was believed to be lost.

Blue Underground released the movie on Blu-ray, and held some theatrical showings of the feature as well, in November 2014.

In addition to standalone releases, the film was included in the three-DVD box set Superstars of Horror: Volume 1: Peter Cushing (Umbrella Entertainment, 2005).

== Reception ==
From contemporary reviews, Tom Milne of the Monthly Film Bulletin commented that the zombie Nazis looked "agreeably sinister when they first emerge from the bottom of the sea with dripping hair, hideously scarred faces and uniform dark glasses", but the film's "inadequate budget is all too evident [...] both script and direction are also much too ready to settle for simple repetitions: a sizeable chunk of the footage is devoted to assorted characters stumbling through swampy shallows out of which, naturally, zombies emerge with sinister intent."

From retrospective reviews, Mike Long of DVD Talk rated the film 3 out of 5 stars, writing, "Horror fans looking for a zombie gorefest will be quite disappointed by Shock Waves, but those who want a subtle and unique experience may enjoy this quirky low-budget film." Oktay Ege Kozak, also writing at DVD Talk, rated it 1 out of 5 stars, declaring, "Shock Waves is a cheap, uninteresting, and entirely too forgettable genre effort from the 70s, a decade that otherwise revitalized horror cinema."

Patrick Bromley of DVD Verdict commented, "More concerned with atmosphere than with shocks, it avoids a number of what would become the cliches of the genre; the flip side of that coin is that it delivers little of what we want from a zombie film." Patrick Naugle, also writing at DVD Verdict, said the movie is repetitious and boring.

Writing in Horror Movies of the 1970s, critic John Kenneth Muir stated that despite Shock Waves being a "low budget exploitation film with a ludicrous B-movie premise", Wiederhorn nevertheless makes it work. Peter Dendle, who wrote The Zombie Movie Encyclopedia, said, "Shock Waves offers an undeniably creative and innovative approach to the screen presentation of the zombie, at the height of the post-Night decade in which such innovation was most lacking."
