= Vestron Video =

Revived American home video company

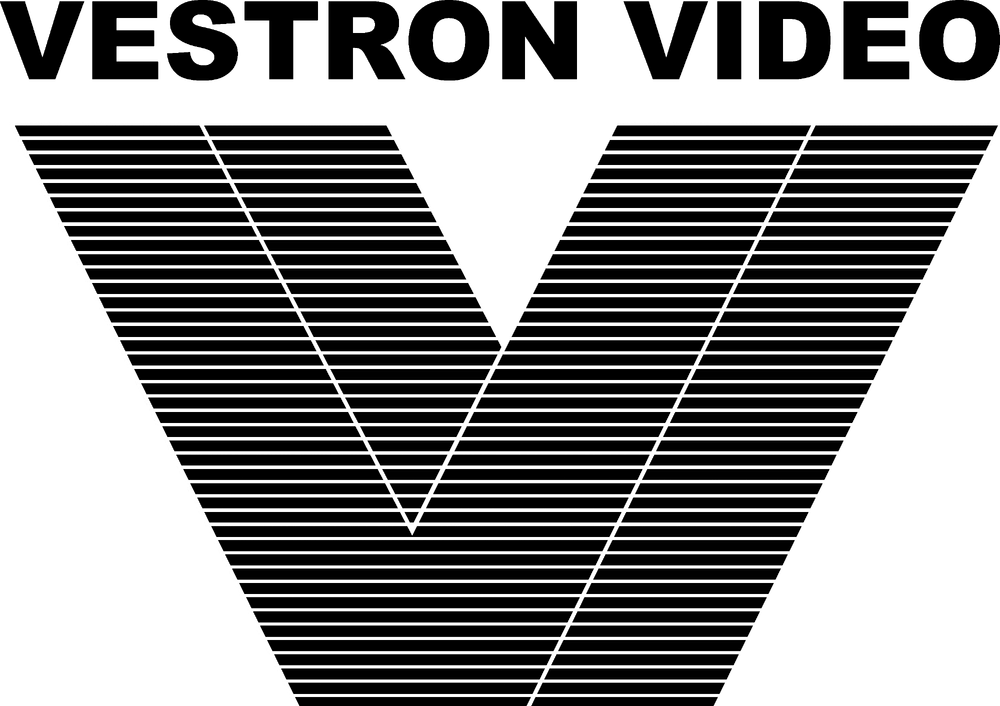
- Logo used as of 2016, similar to the original Vestron Video's 1982–86 logo.
- Type: Private
- Industry: Home video
- Founded: 1981; 45 years ago (Original); 2016; 10 years ago (Revival)
- Founder: Austin Owen Furst Jr.
- Defunct: 1993; 33 years ago (Original)
- Fate: Parent company filed for Chapter 11 bankruptcy, assets acquired by LIVE Entertainment
- Headquarters: Stamford, Connecticut
- Key people: Austin Owen Furst Jr.
- Parent: Vestron, Inc. (1981–1991); LIVE Entertainment (1991–1993); Lionsgate Home Entertainment (2016–present)

Vestron Video is the main subsidiary of Vestron, Inc., a home video company based in Stamford, Connecticut, that was active from 1981 to 1993, and is considered to have been a pioneer in the home video market.

The name is now used for a collector-oriented home entertainment label of Lionsgate Studios.

== History ==
Vestron was founded in 1981 by Austin Owen Furst Jr. (born 1943), an executive at HBO, who was hired to dismantle the assets of Time-Life Films. Furst bought the video rights of the film library, which also included several productions for HBO (then-owned by Time-Life) as well as films HBO had invested seed money in, for himself and decided to form a home entertainment company with these assets. Furst's daughter suggested the moniker "Vestron," a portmanteau combining the name of Roman goddess Vesta and "Tron", which means "instrument" in Greek.

The company held on to its Time-Life Video library, and was also responsible for releases on videocassette and CED Videodisc (CED) of mostly B movies and films from the Cannon Films' library. The most notable titles Vestron released in its early days were Monster Squad and An American Werewolf in London. In later years, the company began to shift towards mainstream films, including films released through their Vestron Pictures subsidiary, most notably Dirty Dancing. Vestron was the first company to release National Geographic and PBS' Nova videos in the late 1980s, mostly distributed by Image Entertainment, and was the first to market with a pro wrestling video, Pro Wrestling Illustrated Presents Lords of the Ring. They also released a 3-volume series called How to Beat Home Video Games, which contains strategies for video games of the time.

They also handled exclusive US distribution, marketing and sales of VidAmerica releases beginning in 1983. Starting in 1985, they handed these duties to their genre sub-label, Lightning Video. In 1987, VidAmerica split away from Vestron and launched its own distribution business.

Vestron went public on the New York Stock Exchange in 1985 with what was, at the time, a large market cap initial public offering (IPO) of $440 million, which was oversubscribed. The company enjoyed success for several years, at one point exceeding 10% of the US video movie market. At its high point sales approximated $350 million annually, and the company sold video movies in over 30 countries either directly or through sub-licensing agreements. This was a rights business, built by people who saw the value in video (VCR) rights to films before the major studios did. Eventually they recognized the market potential and film products became increasingly harder for Vestron to acquire. Also, independent producers increased the price of what was available.

=== Individual licensing agreements ===
In the Australian market, Vestron Video International initially had a contract with leading firm Video Classics to handle video distribution of its titles. It switched affiliation to Communications and Entertainment Limited in 1984, and begin affiliating with ex-Video Classics member Filmways Australasian Distributors (later Filmpac Holdings) in 1985, before shutting its Australian unit down.

In 1983, Vestron signed an agreement to license several of the films from Sherwood Productions for U.S. and Canadian video distribution. Also that year, Vestron signed a deal to pick up several feature films from Artists Releasing Corporation, namely Vigilante and The House on Sorority Row. In 1984, Vestron Video and Empire Pictures entered into a five-title agreement in which Vestron would handle worldwide distribution of five of the motion pictures produced by Empire.

On June 11, 1985, Vestron Video signed an agreement with New Century Entertainment and financer SLM Inc., in which SLM's titles would be distributed on video by Vestron and theatrically by MGM/UA Entertainment Co. On February 11, 1986, Vestron Video and ABC Video Enterprises set up a joint venture ABC/Vestron, for the home video releases of the Capital Cities/ABC television archives. All home video releases from the pact were compilation releases, and not entire programs originally aired by the network.

On June 18, 1986, the company signed an agreement with Zupnik Enterprises to release five titles on videocassette; the company's predecessor, Zupnik/Curtis Enterprises, once had an agreement with Thorn EMI/HBO Video to distribute films. On June 25, 1986, the company also signed an agreement with film producer and distributor Hemdale Film Corporation, in which Vestron would obtain home video rights to their film library for the North American region, such as Platoon. This was an extension of the previous licensing agreement that saw the company release videocassettes of films such as Hoosiers and At Close Range.

In 1986, Vestron was rumored to buy independent film distributor Producers Sales Organization, but the deal collapsed, and PSO was shut down outright, forced into bankruptcy, and subsequently renamed Producers Distribution International, then Interaccess Film Distribution, which, on October 8, 1986, became a studio-controlled foreign sales firm, reflecting the company's commitment to provide an international network of distributors with access to quality, independently produced product.

The company soon dropped its PDO tag, and announced output deals with Zupnik Enterprises, Taft-Barish Productions, and a picture-by-picture agreement with RKO Pictures. Films from these agreements would not all flow into Interaccess that easily; the staff decided that the rights to those films would revert to the film's producers, and the company would be free to renegotiate the output deals or producers in order to take their business elsewhere. The deal represented the first three titles delivered by PSO after the agreement was signed, such as The Princess Bride, and two RKO productions Hamburger Hill and Hot Pursuit, and a remake of the 1956 film And God Created Woman.

On October 15, 1986, Vestron Video International signed independent deals with Italian video distributor Domovideo and Korean video distributor Oasis Video Productions. These deals covered 35 titles originating from the Vestron catalog, including upcoming theatrical features.

In March 1987, Vestron Video and Granada Television, the UK ITV franchisee holder, signed an agreement to release titles from its back catalog in an exclusive licensing deal for the burgeoning UK sell-through market. This deal included serials The Jewel in the Crown and Brideshead Revisited, together with special compilations from Granada's own ITV franchisee programme Coronation Street. The company thus had the world's largest recorded video catalog of the time with a single license covering 26 titles plus 12 further titles.

On June 3, 1987, the Vestron Video-Hemdale Film Corporation lawsuit was challenged by a rival home video distributor Nelson Entertainment. Nelson filed the countersuit because it also held video rights to the 12 Hemdale pictures under almost identical terms as the arrangement Vestron attempted to enforce, adding High Tide in that deal by extension. In July 1987, Vestron Inc. exercised an option to purchase a Cincinnati-area video store chain called The Video Store, which consisted of 10 stores, with owner Jack Messer giving the company another 14 during the July–October period. That year, in August 1987, Vestron promoted Michael Karaffa to sales vice president and Adam Platnick to business affairs vice president, while the company also saw more layoffs, including those of former executives, namely Raymond Bernstein and Gordon Bossin, who both had layoffs in May.

=== Later years ===
On October 1, 1986, Vestron Video revamped their internal structure on non-theatricals, promoting the head of the Children's Video Library label, C.J. Kettler, to film acquisition vice president, and shifting the existing operations of Children's Video Library to supervisor Michael Wiese, who subsequently ran a new non-theatrical programming unit as vice president of the studio. Kettler would manage the Vestron team of buyers and manage contracts, and head the feature film acquisition effort. On November 26, 1986, Vestron rejected a takeover bid from the magazine publisher National Lampoon, which the company tried to purchase earlier that year.

The company started to make its own films (Dirty Dancing, Earth Girls Are Easy, Blue Steel), but when the market's preferences matured, and shifted from watching almost any film to just watching "A" titles, which was the majors' specialty, Vestron was already committed to about 20 "B" to low-"A" projects. In 1986, Vestron launched syndicated television distribution unit Vestron Television to syndicate Vestron films to local TV stations.

In 1987, the television unit signed an outsourcing agreement with All American Television to handle syndication of the company's features. That year, Vestron Television International was formed, managed by executives from Interaccess Film Distribution, and Gregory Cascante, president of Interaccess, was named president of Vestron Television International.

In 1987, Vestron Inc. formed a new single unit, the Vestron International Group, with Jon Peisinger as president of the new division, encompassing Interaccess Film Distribution, Vestron Video International, Vestron Pictures International and Locus Video Group. The announcement came after Gregory Cascante has resigned as president of Interaccess Film Distribution, and the operation would have more centralizing Vestron offices in those regions. In late November 1987, Vestron Video revamped their distribution network to get rid of 9 out of 23 distributors and enrolled the 14 in a new "Vestron Advantage" program designed to gave the distributors more incentives and a means to market to sell Vestron tapes more efficiently.

The company had its first top-selling title in 1988 with the hit release of the home video version of the hit Vestron Pictures film Dirty Dancing, a top title retailing for the then-industry-standard price of $89.98, marking the company's first big film to handle sponsorship in excess of Vestron's home video standards. In 1988, it attempted to enter the primetime television market with a television series version of Dirty Dancing for CBS, but the series was cancelled after one season.

The company's financing fell through and it eventually filed for Chapter 11 bankruptcy in 1990. In a 2021 interview, Furst explained that Vestron's bank, Security Pacific National Bank, pulled their line of credit to Vestron as Security Pacific was seeking to sell itself to Bank of America; Furst sued Bank of America and settled out of court for $100 million. On January 11, 1991, Vestron was bought out by Los Angeles-based LIVE Entertainment, a rival home video and music company, for $27.3 million. LIVE acquired Vestron's extensive (3,000 plus) film library; Vestron executive Kevin Kasha was hired by LIVE to relaunch the label and titles continued to be released under the Vestron name until 1993 under LIVE distribution. The International branches were split up and sold off after the bankruptcy during 1991, the UK branch in particular had been sold a year before to Welsh ITV franchise holder HTV, which renamed it to First Independent Films. Vestron also sold off its TV holdings, including 160 films, TV specials and series to the Paris-based Pandora Group in 1990 and decided to invest their money.

Vestron's international divisions themselves were the second largest after Warner Home Video. Vestron had many direct theatrical, video and TV distribution offices around the world in major markets, and owned a video manufacturing plant in the Netherlands to supply European markets. Today, most of Vestron Video's holdings are owned by Lions Gate Entertainment, which acquired LIVE's successor company, Artisan Entertainment, in 2003.

== Subsidiaries ==
Vestron, Inc.'s subsidiaries included:

- Vestron Video (1981–1993)
- Vestron Pictures (1986–1993)
- Vestron Pictures International (1986–1987)
- Vestron Music Video (1980s)
- Vestron International Group (1986–1991): Overseas distribution unit, formerly entitled Interaccess Film Distribution and Producers Distribution Organization. Many of its staff were hired from Producers Sales Organization after its bankruptcy.
  - Vestron Pictures Japan (1987–1990); later ASCII Vestron, Ascii Film and Ascii Visual Entertainment; Japanese subsidiary; now Enterbrain.
- Vestron Television (1986–1990): Former syndicated television unit, whose most notable production was a television series based on Dirty Dancing.
- Vestron Video International (1982–1991)
- Children's Video Library (1983–1987): Children's/family video sub-label.
- High Ridge Productions (1980s): Produced the 1985 documentary The Beach Boys: An American Band.
- Lightning Video (1985–1990): genre sub-label.
- Lightning Pictures (1987–1989)
- Lightning Video International (1985–1990)

== Vestron Video Collector's Series ==
On August 1, 2016, Lionsgate Home Entertainment announced its revival of the Vestron Video brand as a Blu-ray and DVD reissue label for Vestron and other Lionsgate-owned horror films, similar to boutique labels like Scream Factory and Blue Underground. This line, dubbed the Vestron Video Collector's Series, is branded with an updated version of the first Vestron Video logo from 1982 to 1986 and began with Blu-ray releases of the cult films Chopping Mall (an outside theatrical release) and Blood Diner (released by Lightning Pictures) on September 27, 2016.

=== Releases ===
#	Title	Home Video Release	Theatrical Release	Original Distributor	Format(s)	Notes
01	Chopping Mall	September 27, 2016	March 21, 1986	Concorde Pictures	Blu-ray	
02	Blood Diner	September 27, 2016	July 10, 1987	Lightning Pictures	Blu-ray	
03	Waxwork	October 18, 2016	June 17, 1988	Vestron Pictures	Blu-ray	Double Feature
03	Waxwork II: Lost in Time	October 18, 2016	June 16, 1992	Electric Pictures	Blu-ray	Double Feature
04	Return of the Living Dead 3	November 22, 2016	October 29, 1993	Trimark Pictures	Blu-ray	
05	C.H.U.D. II: Bud the C.H.U.D.	November 22, 2016	September 27, 1989	Vestron Pictures	Blu-ray	
06	The Lair of the White Worm	January 31, 2017	September 14, 1988	Vestron Pictures	Blu-ray	
07	Parents	January 31, 2017	January 27, 1989	Vestron Pictures	Blu-ray	
08	The Gate	February 28, 2017	May 15, 1987	New Century Vista Film Company; Vista Organization	Blu-ray	
09	Wishmaster	March 28, 2017	September 19, 1997	LIVE Entertainment	Blu-ray	4-Film Set
09	Wishmaster 2: Evil Never Dies	March 28, 2017	August 17, 1999	Artisan Entertainment	Blu-ray	4-Film Set
09	Wishmaster 3: Beyond the Gates of Hell	March 28, 2017	October 23, 2001	Artisan Entertainment	Blu-ray	4-Film Set
09	Wishmaster: The Prophecy Fulfilled	March 28, 2017	October 22, 2002	Artisan Entertainment	Blu-ray	4-Film Set
10	The Unholy	June 27, 2017	April 22, 1988	Vestron Pictures	Blu-ray	
11	Warlock	July 25, 2017	January 11, 1991	Trimark Pictures; New World Pictures	Blu-ray	3-Film Set
11	Warlock: The Armageddon	July 25, 2017	September 24, 1993	Trimark Pictures; Tapestry Films	Blu-ray	3-Film Set
11	Warlock III: The End of Innocence	July 25, 2017	October 12, 1999	Trimark Pictures	Blu-ray	3-Film Set
12	Slaughter High	October 31, 2017	November 14, 1986	Vestron Pictures	Blu-ray	
13	Gothic	January 30, 2018	April 10, 1987	Vestron Pictures	Blu-ray	
14	Class of 1999	January 30, 2018	May 11, 1990	Lightning Pictures	Blu-ray	
15	Beyond Re-Animator	July 24, 2018	April 4, 2003	Lions Gate Entertainment	Blu-ray	
16	Dagon	July 24, 2018	October 31, 2001	Lions Gate Entertainment	Blu-ray	
17	Maximum Overdrive	October 23, 2018	July 25, 1986	De Laurentiis Entertainment Group	Blu-ray	Licenced from Studio Canal
18	Shivers	September 15, 2020	October 10, 1975	Cinepix	Blu-ray	
19	Little Monsters	September 15, 2020	August 25, 1989	Vestron Pictures	Blu-ray	
20	The Wraith	July 20, 2021	November 21, 1986	New Century Vista Film Company	Blu-ray	
21	Sundown: The Vampire in Retreat	August 17, 2021	October 23, 1991	Vestron Pictures	Blu-ray	
22	Dementia 13	September 21, 2021	September 25, 1963	American International Pictures	Blu-ray	
23	Steel Dawn	October 26, 2021	November 6, 1987	Vestron Pictures	Blu-ray	
24	Candyman: Day of the Dead	January 18, 2022	July 9, 1999	Artisan Entertainment	Blu-ray	
25	Dream a Little Dream	March 15, 2022	March 3, 1989	Vestron Pictures	Blu-ray	
26	Extreme Prejudice	May 17, 2022	April 24, 1987	Carolco Pictures	Blu-ray	
27	Earth Girls Are Easy	November 8, 2022	May 12, 1989	Vestron Pictures	Blu-ray	
28	Silent Night, Deadly Night 3: Better Watch Out!	December 13, 2022	November 17, 1989	International Video Entertainment	Blu-ray	3-Film Set
28	Silent Night, Deadly Night 4: Initiation	December 13, 2022	November 21, 1990	LIVE Entertainment	Blu-ray	3-Film Set
28	Silent Night, Deadly Night 5: The Toy Maker	December 13, 2022	November 7, 1991	LIVE Entertainment	Blu-ray	3-Film Set
29	The Dentist	January 24, 2023	October 18, 1996	Trimark Pictures	Blu-ray	Double Feature
29	The Dentist 2	January 24, 2023	December 18, 1998	Trimark Pictures	Blu-ray	Double Feature
30	My Best Friend Is a Vampire	July 25, 2023	May 6, 1988	Kings Road Entertainment	Blu-ray	
31	Blue Steel	November 14, 2023	March 16, 1990	Lightning Pictures	Blu-ray	
32	May	May 13, 2025	February 7, 2003	Lionsgate	Blu-ray	
33	All of Me	June 17, 2025	September 21, 1984	Kings Road Entertainment	Blu-ray	
34	Ghoulies Go to College	July 15, 2025	September 18, 1991	Vestron Pictures	Blu-ray	
35	Hider in the House	October 14, 2025	August 22, 1991	Vestron Pictures	Blu-ray	
36	Mystery Team	January 13, 2026	July 28, 2009	Roadside Attractions	Blu-ray	
37	The Substitute	March 17, 2026	April 19, 1996	LIVE Entertainment	4K Ultra HD Blu-ray	
38	The Stoned Age	April 20, 2026	February 11, 1994	Trimark Pictures	Blu-ray	
39	Ginger Snaps	May 19, 2026	August 1, 2000	TVA Films	4K Ultra HD Blu-ray	
40	The Arrival	June 16, 2026	May 31, 1996	LIVE Entertainment	4K Ultra HD Blu-ray	
41	Kickboxer 2	September 15, 2026	June 13, 1991	Trimark Pictures	Blu-ray	
