= Eyes of a Stranger (1981 film) =

1981 American slasher film by Ken Wiederhorn

- Theatrical release poster
- Directed by: Ken Wiederhorn
- Written by: Ron Kurz (credited to Mark Jackson)
- Produced by: Ronald Zerra
- Starring: Lauren Tewes; Jennifer Jason Leigh; John DiSanti; Peter DuPre
- Cinematography: Mini Rojas
- Edited by: Rick Shaine
- Music by: Richard Einhorn
- Production company: Georgetown Productions Inc.
- Distributed by: Warner Bros. Pictures
- Release dates: February 11, 1981 (Japan); March 27, 1981 (United States)
- Running time: 85 minutes
- Country: United States
- Language: English
- Box office: $1.1 million

Eyes of a Stranger is a 1981 American slasher film directed by Ken Wiederhorn, and starring Lauren Tewes and Jennifer Jason Leigh. The plot concerns a newscaster in Miami who suspects that her neighbor may be a local rapist and serial killer. It features makeup effects by Tom Savini.

== Plot ==
Jane, a newscaster in Miami, reports on the latest victim of a serial killer and rapist. She lives with and cares for her teenage sister, Tracy, who is blind and deaf-mute owing to a conversion disorder she suffered after being kidnapped and raped as a young girl, something Jane remains tormented by due to her leaving Tracy alone shortly before it occurred. In her newscast, she frequently goes off-script to make impassioned pleas for the killer to be caught, and for other women in the city to exercise caution. That night, Debbie, a waitress at a local bar, receives threatening phone calls at her home. She reports the calls to the police, who agree to send an investigator over the following morning. Her boyfriend, Jeff, arrives, startling her. Shortly afterwards, the killer, a man named Stanley Herbert, sneaks inside and decapitates Jeff before raping and strangling Debbie to death.

While parking in the garage of her apartment complex, Jane observes Stanley returning in his own car and disposing of a blood-stained shirt and belt. Later that night, Jane consults the building management, claiming she accidentally hit Stanley's car and compelling them to give her his name; she learns he lives in the apartment tower directly across from her own. Suspecting Stanley of being the killer, Jane confides in her attorney boyfriend, David, about what she saw; however, David informs her the evidence is merely circumstantial. Later that night, Annette, a local secretary, receives threatening calls from Stanley while alone in her office building. She calls one of her friends in a panic to warn her before leaving the office, but is then murdered by Stanley, who had been waiting for her inside her car. Stanley disposes of Annette's body in a gravel pit, but is noticed by a couple parked in a nearby car; he kills both of them before leaving.

After Stanley has returned home, Jane observes the wheels of his car are covered in mud. The next morning, when Jane learns of the three corpses found in the gravel pit, she rushes to the garage again and discovers Stanley's car has been washed. Jane subsequently interviews the friend Annette had called shortly before her death as part of a special news report she is doing about the killings; she tells Jane that Annette had mentioned hearing strange music playing in the background of the harassing calls she had received.

Determined to find evidence implicating Stanley, Jane steals the keys to his apartment from a maintenance cabinet. Entering, she finds mud-covered shoes in Stanley's closet and a cuckoo clock on the wall, which she suspects of being the source of the music Annette had heard. However, Stanley returns home while she is still in his apartment; she takes one of his shoes and escapes by climbing out his balcony to the apartment below. Jane gives the shoe to David, who begrudgingly agrees to have it tested. After buying a revolver and bullets on her way home and hiding them in her dresser, she calls Stanley in his apartment and taunts him, calling him a "phone freak" and telling him to turn himself in. Unnerved, Stanley leaves his apartment and heads to a strip club, then follows one of the dancers to her home and murders her.

The next day, during her special report, Jane describes the culprit as a "phone freak"; Stanley, who is watching the broadcast, realizes she is the one who had called him. He watches Jane's apartment from his own, observing Tracy on the balcony. That night, Jane decides to sneak into Stanley's apartment again while he is seemingly away, leaving Tracy alone. David leaves a message on Jane's home phone telling her the mud on Stanley's shoe matches the mud found at the site of the previous murders, but as only Tracy is in the apartment, the message goes unheard. Entering Stanley's apartment, Jane discovers the cuckoo clock contains a music box whose melody matches the one Annette's friend had described. Unknown to her, however, Stanley has infiltrated her own apartment as well. After killing Tracy's service dog, he toys with her by moving objects out of her field of touch, and she quickly realizes something is wrong. When he starts to assault Tracy, she fights back, throwing a pot of coffee in his face and hiding in a closet. He finds her and tries to assault her again, but the relived trauma of the experience causes Tracy's sight and hearing to start returning, and she fends him off. Meanwhile, Jane sees Stanley in the window of her apartment and rushes back in horror.

Tracy, after finding Jane's revolver, manages to shoot Stanley in the abdomen. Tracy drops the gun in the hallway, assuming Stanley is dead, then enters the bathroom and stares at her teenage self in the mirror for the first time. However, Stanley attacks her again, trying to strangle her, but Jane returns just in time and shoots him through the head, finally killing him. Tracy calls Jane's name when she sees her, and Jane realizes that Tracy has fully regained her senses; the two tearfully embrace as Stanley's body lies in the bathtub, covered in glass and blood.

== Cast ==
- Lauren Tewes as Jane Harris
- Jennifer Jason Leigh as Tracy Harris
- John DiSanti as Stanley Herbert
- Peter DuPre as David
- Gwen Lewis as Debbie Ormsley
- Kitty Lunn as Annette
- Timothy Hawkins as Jeff
- Ted Richert as Roger England
- Toni Crabtree as Mona
- Bob Small as Dr. Bob
- Stella Rivera as Dancer
- Dan Fitzgerald as Bartender
- José Bahamande as Jimmy
- Luke Halpin as Tape Editor
- Rhonda Flynn as Woman in Car

== Release ==
Eyes of a Stranger was released in 180 theaters in the United States by Warner Bros. Pictures on March 27, 1981, earning $546,724 during its opening weekend. It eventually grossed an estimated $1.1 million.

=== Censorship ===
The film was originally cut for an R-rating, removing many instances of violence including a decapitation from the film, leaving only the final head shot uncut. As a result, many of Tom Savini's gore effects were cut out or edited.

=== Critical reception ===
Janet Maslin of The New York Times called it "a cheap, sleazy horror movie," but praised Jennifer Jason Leigh as "the only thing worth seeing." AllMovie wrote, "this tired, unimaginative slasher-thriller plays like a sleazy TV movie-of-the-week punctuated with gory murder scenes". Gene Siskel and Roger Ebert gave the film "No" votes on their TV show Sneak Previews, but both critics said the film was unusually well-made and technically sound for a slasher film, with Siskel referencing the director's past work on PBS shows and suggesting Wiederhorn probably had better material for future films.

=== Home media ===
An uncut version of the film was released on DVD as part of Warner's "Twisted Terror Collection" with an R-rating on the packaging. On May 18, 2021, Scream Factory released the film on Blu-ray.
