= Gina Gallego =

American actress

- Born: Georgina Maria Gallego; Los Angeles, California, U.S.
- Occupation: Actress
- Years active: 1978–present
- Spouse: Joel Bailey

Georgina Maria Gallego is an American actress with a career spanning over 100 film and television credits. She has appeared in daytime soap operas, primetime television and feature films. She was regular cast member on the soap operas Rituals (1984-1985), Santa Barbara (1985-1989) and Generations (1990). She made recurring appearances on primetime series such as Flamingo Road, Reasonable Doubts, Shooter and Crazy Ex-Girlfriend.

== Life and career ==
Gallego was born in Los Angeles, California. She is of Mexican descent. She made her big screen debut appearing in the 1979 drama film, The Champ. She later made guest appearances on television series such as CHiPs, How the West Was Won, Young Maverick, Trapper John, M.D. and Sanford. In 1981, she was cast as Alicia Sanchez (who marries Skipper Wheldon, a series’ lead, during the show's second season) in the NBC primetime soap opera, Flamingo Road appearing in 15 episodes to its final episode in 1982. During her Flamingo Road time, she met her future husband, actor Joel Bailey who played the role of Tony Prado.

After Flamingo Road, Gallego co-starred in the NBC two-part miniseries Bare Essence in 1982, and guest-starred on Hill Street Blues, Remington Steele, T. J. Hooker, Fantasy Island and Airwolf. In 1984 she was cast as Diandra Santiago Gallagher on the daytime soap opera, Rituals, the series lasted one season and was canceled in 1985. In 1985 she joined the cast of NBC soap opera, Santa Barbara playing the role of Santana Andrade. She left the series in 1989 and later joined the cast of another NBC soap Generations for short run. During the 1980s, Gallego also appeared in feature films Underground Aces (1981), Deadly Force (1983), Lust in the Dust (1985), The Men's Club (1986) and My Demon Lover (1987). In 1990 she starred alongside Stephanie Zimbalist in the made-for-television movie Personals, and the same year appeared in Rainbow Drive. In 1991 she was regular cast member on the short-lived ABC late-night comedy series, Studio 59 Into the Night and had a recurring role in the police drama series, Reasonable Doubts. Gallego played a character named Gina in the season 3 episode of Seinfeld titled "The Suicide" in 1992. Her character shares a on-screen kiss with Jerry Seinfeld. From 1993 to 1998 she had a recurring role on the CBS daytime soap opera, The Bold and the Beautiful playing Dr. Gina Santana. Her primetime television appearances during the 1990s include Beverly Hills, 90210, Murder One, ER and NYPD Blue, as well made-for-television movies Keeper of the City (1991), Judgment Day: The John List Story (1993) and Naomi & Wynonna: Love Can Build a Bridge (1995).

In 2000, Gallego appeared as attorney Sanchez in the legal drama film, Erin Brockovich directed by Steven Soderbergh. She later appeared in films Minority Report (2002), Mr. Deeds (2002), Anger Management (2003), Winged Creatures (2008), Beverly Hills Chihuahua (2008), Life Blood (2009), Duress (2009) and The Time Being (2012). She guest-starred on The Twilight Zone, Grey's Anatomy, Shameless, The Middle, Grimm, NCIS, Station 19 and Bosch. In 2010, Gallego joined the cast of Days of Our Lives as recurring character, Warden Jane Smith. She appeared on soap from October 5, 2010 to February 1, 2011. From 2015 to 2019 she played Mrs. Hernandez in the CW comedy-drama series, Crazy Ex-Girlfriend, and in 2018 played the recurring character Estella in 8 episodes of the USA Network drama series, Shooter.
