= Jonathan Terry =

American actor

Jonathan Terry is a television and film actor. He is best known for his role as Starker in Halloween III: Season of the Witch. He also played Colonel Glover in The Return of the Living Dead and Return of the Living Dead Part II.

== Filmography ==
Year	Title	Role	Ref.
1978	Corvette Summer	Van Nuys Policeman	
1981	Cutter's Way	Police Captain	
1981	...All the Marbles	Akron Doctor	
1982	Halloween III: Season of the Witch	Starker	
1983	Deal of the Century	Gaylord	
1984	Against All Odds	Ryskind	
1985	The Return of the Living Dead	Colonel Horace Glover	
1988	Return of the Living Dead Part II	Colonel Horace Glover	
2015	Little Paradise	Fred	
