= Silent Night (2012 film) =

2012 film by Steven C. Miller

- Theatrical release poster
- Directed by: Steven C. Miller
- Screenplay by: Jayson Rothwell
- Based on: Silent Night, Deadly Night by Charles E. Sellier, Jr.
- Produced by: Shara Kay; Phyllis Laing; Richard Saperstein; Brian Witten
- Starring: Malcolm McDowell; Jaime King; Donal Logue; Ellen Wong; Brendan Fehr
- Cinematography: Joseph White
- Edited by: Seth Flaum
- Music by: Kevin Riepl
- Production companies: Buffalo Gal Pictures; Media House Capital
- Distributed by: Anchor Bay Films
- Release date: November 30, 2012
- Running time: 94 minutes
- Countries: United States; Canada
- Language: English
- Box office: $130,781

Silent Night is a 2012 slasher film directed by Steven C. Miller and starring Malcolm McDowell, Jaime King, Donal Logue, Ellen Wong, and Brendan Fehr. It is the reboot of Charles E. Sellier, Jr.'s 1984 film Silent Night, Deadly Night and the sixth installment in the Silent Night, Deadly Night film series. It received mixed reviews from critics. It was given a limited theatrical release on November 30, 2012, and was released on DVD and Blu-ray Disc on December 4.

== Plot ==
A mysterious man dresses in a Santa Claus suit, complete with a mask. Once dressed, "Santa" captures and kills Deputy Kevin Jordan in the small town of Cryer, Wisconsin. Jordan is sleeping with the married Alana Roach and is electrocuted with Christmas lights in his home. The following day, Christmas Eve, Sheriff James Cooper calls Deputy Aubrey Bradimore in on her day off when Jordan does not arrive at work. Aubrey is a new addition to the sheriff's office and is still reeling from the unexpected death of her husband John. She does not think she is a good deputy, as she is trying to live up to her father, a retired sheriff. Aubrey was going to spend the holiday with her parents but instead goes out to check on Jordan, finding his mangled body, and Roach, who has been dismembered, later in the day. Sheriff Cooper decides not to tell Mayor Revie until the case is solved.

Meanwhile, the masked Santa killer goes on a murder spree, killing those who have done something he considers 'naughty.' His next victim is a bratty teenage girl who he kills with a cattle prod. He then makes his way to the local motel, murdering Frank and Goldie during a softcore porn shoot. Maria tries to hide in a Christmas tree farm, but the killer chops off one of her legs and shoves her into a woodchipper. Sheriff Cooper calls in Deputy Stanley Giles and goes out to find the killer himself but comes back empty-handed. The killer Santa arrives at the church and kills the perverted Reverend Madeley for stealing donation money. Aubrey starts to suspect drug dealer Stein Karsson as the killer.

Aubrey attempts to interrogate Karsson, but he flees. Aubrey gives chase, and she is nearly killed but is narrowly saved by Sheriff Cooper. Aubrey and Cooper suspect Santa portrayer Jim Epstein as the killer, who now kills Mayor Revie, his daughter Tiffany, and her boyfriend Dennis. During the town's annual Christmas parade, Aubrey searches for the killer but is unable to identify him among a crowd of men dressed in Santa Claus suits, though she arrests Jim when he flees from her. Aubrey goes to Karsson's motel room to arrest him and is forced to kill him when he draws a gun.

Aubrey notices a gift box that contains a piece of coal and recalls that both the station and her father had received the same gift. Aubrey arrives at her parents' home, only to find her father disemboweled and her mother hiding in the closet. Meanwhile, the killer attacks the station, killing Giles with an axe, torching Cooper with a flamethrower, and beating Jim to death with brass knuckles. Aubrey, along with the station secretary Brenda, are cornered inside the police station, where the killer tries to burn down the building with a homemade flamethrower. Aubrey is able to overpower the killer Santa and sets him on fire, leaving the station with Brenda. Unbeknownst to them, the killer manages to survive and escape.

It is revealed that the killer Santa is Ronald Jones, Jr., owner of a local chimney cleaning and repair service. During the manhunt, Aubrey learned from Karsson that Ronald Sr. had crashed his ex-wife's Christmas party many years ago, burning her alive with the homemade flamethrower. Aubrey's father Hank was the deputy that responded to the situation and gunned him down, causing the flamethrower to explode, burning him to death, only to find out that Ronald Jr. was in his father's truck watching the entire time. The tragedy caused Ronald Jr. to go insane and seek revenge, dressing as Santa so he would not get caught during Cryer's Christmas festivities. The film ends with Ronald Jr leaving Cryer in his truck.

== Cast ==
- Malcolm McDowell as Sheriff James Cooper
- Jaime King as Aubrey Bradimore
- Donal Logue as Jim Epstein, Santa
- Ellen Wong as Brenda
- Lisa Marie as Hilary Morwood
- Courtney-Jane White as Tiffany Revie
- Cortney Palm as Maria
- John B. Lowe as Hank Bradimore
- Rick Skene as Ronald Jones Sr. / Ronald Jones Jr.
- Brendan Fehr as Deputy Kevin Jordan
- Andrew Cecon as Deputy Stanley Giles
- Aaron Hughes as Frank Forester
- Kelly Wolfman as Goldie Willis
- Laura Cartlidge as Morwood Girl
- Mike O'Brien as Stein Karsson, Santa
- Kristen Sawatzky as Jane Jones
- Erik J. Berg as Dennis
- Ali Tataryn as Alana Roach
- Curtis Moore as Reverend Madeley
- Adriana O'Neil as Mrs. Bradimore
- Lane Styles as Mindy Lu
- Tom Anniko as Mayor Revie
- Doreen Brownstone as Old Lady in Church

== Production ==
The idea to remake the original film of the Silent Night, Deadly Night series came in 2006. After a screening of the first film, Scott Schneid, who co-created it, suggested the idea of a remake to Ryan Heppe, who worked at David Foster Productions as a development executive. Heppe convinced Foster to announce that there would be a remake.

Screenwriter Jayson Rothwell had not watched the original Silent Night, Deadly Night, so instead he was asked to write based on his own ideas of what a Christmas-themed horror movie was. Rothwell chose to base the film on the Covina Massacre — on Christmas Eve in 2008, Bruce Jeffrey Pardo opened fire at a Christmas party at his ex-wife’s house and burned the house down, killing multiple people, including himself. He wore a Santa outfit during the attack.

== Release ==
Distributed by Anchor Bay, the film was released in theaters for a limited run in select U.S. cities on November 30, 2012, showing in 11 theaters. It grossed $14,567 in the United States. Internationally, the film grossed $116,214, making for a worldwide gross of $130,781. It was released on DVD and Blu-ray on December 4.

== Reception ==
Rotten Tomatoes gives the film an approval rating of 62%, based on 13 reviews, with a rating average of 5.60/10. Metacritic, which assigns a weighted average score based on reviews from mainstream critics, awarded the film an average score of 53 out of 100 based on 4 reviews, indicating "mixed or average reviews".

The Los Angeles Times wrote that "The movie's intended audience will likely be satisfied by its parade of gory mayhem, cheap thrills and groan-worthy dark humor. Everyone else: You're on your own" while The Hollywood Reporter called the film a "cinematic lump of coal" and a "formulaic effort". Variety felt that the film was "a singularly glum and dumb enterprise" and concluded "apart from some modestly inventive carnage and an undeniably humorous hambone turn by Malcolm McDowell, there's really nothing here to make genre fans dash through the snow".

Bloody Disgusting gave a score of three and a half out of five, writing "While Silent Night does not add anything new to the subgenre, it delivers the ho ho horror with its spectacular kills and tongue-in-cheek humor. This is a fun film that is bound to spread some holiday cheer in the hearts of slasher fans" and Fearnet stated "this straightforward and scrappy little remake is somehow more entertaining than half of what passes for "wide release" horror movies these days. Toss in some fine cinematography, some cool musical touches, and just enough "in jokes" to keep the hardcore horror fans happy, Silent Night certainly isn't great, but it is consistently fun, and that's more than enough—especially for a horror remake". Christopher Safranski of Dread Central stated Silent Night “is one case that I think breaks the standard rule” of originals being superior to remakes because “What makes the remake work is its ability to balance horror and comedy very well”.

== Music ==
=== Soundtrack ===
Silent Night (Original Motion Picture Soundtrack)

Soundtrack album by Kevin Riepl
- Released: November 25, 2012
- Length: 62:08
- Label: Pale Blue Records
- Producer: Kevin Riepl

Silent Night (Original Motion Picture Soundtrack) is the soundtrack album for the movie, released on November 25, 2012 under the record label Pale Blue Records. The music was composed by Kevin Riepl.

=== Track listing ===
No.	Title	Writer(s)	Length
1.	"Santa Suits Up"	Kevin Riepl	2:02
2.	"Basement Boy"	Kevin Riepl	2:45
3.	"Aubrey"	Kevin Riepl	3:28
4.	"Ungrateful Little"	Kevin Riepl	1:31
5.	"The House"	Kevin Riepl	4:57
6.	"Sherriff Cooper"	Kevin Riepl	1:09
7.	"Run to the Chipper"	Kevin Riepl	3:10
8.	"The Chipper"	Kevin Riepl	2:05
9.	"They See Dead People"	Kevin Riepl	3:34
10.	"The Story"	Kevin Riepl	1:58
11.	"Watching You"	Kevin Riepl	2:03
12.	"Evil Sermon"	Kevin Riepl	3:00
13.	"Mr. Snow"	Kevin Riepl	2:39
14.	"Linking Murders"	Kevin Riepl	2:02
15.	"Rack Mounted"	Kevin Riepl	2:49
16.	"Santa Jim Runs"	Kevin Riepl	1:30
17.	"Karssen’s Kitchen"	Kevin Riepl	3:19
18.	"The Gift"	Kevin Riepl	2:24
19.	"Santa Brawl"	Kevin Riepl	3:40
20.	"Axe Santa"	Kevin Riepl	4:25
21.	"How It Began"	Kevin Riepl	2:08
22.	"Silent Night Suite"	Kevin Riepl	5:30
Total length:			62:08
