= Born in East L.A. (film) =

1987 film by Cheech Marin

- Theatrical release poster by Drew Struzan and Mick McGinty
- Directed by: Cheech Marin
- Screenplay by: Cheech Marin
- Produced by: Peter MacGregor-Scott
- Starring: Cheech Marin; Daniel Stern; Paul Rodriguez; Jan Michael Vincent; Kamala Lopez; Tony Plana
- Cinematography: Alex Phillips Jr.
- Edited by: Don Brochu; Stephen Lovejoy; David Newhouse; Mike Sheridan
- Music by: Lee Holdridge
- Production company: Clear Type
- Distributed by: Universal Pictures
- Release date: August 21, 1987 (United States)
- Running time: 85 minutes
- Country: United States
- Language: English
- Box office: $17 million (US)

Born in East L.A. is a 1987 American satirical comedy film written and directed by Cheech Marin in his feature film directorial debut, who also starred in the film. It co-stars Paul Rodriguez, Daniel Stern, Kamala Lopez, Jan-Michael Vincent, Lupe Ontiveros and Jason Scott Lee in his feature film debut. The film is based on his song of the same name, released as a 1985 single by Cheech & Chong. The film focuses on Rudy Robles, a Mexican-American from East Los Angeles who is mistaken for an undocumented migrant and deported.

Born in East L.A. marked Marin's first solo film, without the involvement of his comedy partner, Tommy Chong, at the insistence of executive Frank Price, who was fired between greenlighting and production due to the failure of Howard the Duck. Born in East L.A. was ultimately a financial success, and bolstered Marin's reputation in the Latino community, winning several awards at the Havana Film Festival.

== Plot ==
Guadalupe Rudolfo "Rudy" Robles is told by his mother to pick up his cousin Javier at a factory in Downtown Los Angeles before she and his sister leave for Fresno. Robles arrives shortly before immigration officials raid the factory, and because he is carrying no identification and cannot confirm he is a U.S. citizen, he is deported to Mexico.

In Tijuana, Rudy becomes friends with Jimmy and Dolores. Unable to contact his mother, Rudy makes repeated attempts to cross the border, all ending in failure. He cannot speak more than very simple Spanglish, though he is fluent in German from having served in West Germany in the United States Army. Jimmy offers to get him back home for a price. Having left home without his wallet, Rudy works for Jimmy as doorman at a strip club, earning extra money selling oranges and teaching five would-be immigrants to walk and talk like East Los Angeles natives.

Rudy falls in love with Dolores and finally raises the money needed to be smuggled across the border. He goes on a date with Dolores and the next day, Rudy bids farewell to Jimmy, receives a last kiss goodbye from Dolores, and climbs into the truck that will take him across the border. After seeing a woman pleading to join her husband on the truck despite lacking the money to pay, Rudy gives the woman his place.

Rudy stands for the last time on the hill of the Mexico–United States border while two immigration officers sit in their truck watching in laughter. As Rudy raises his arms, hundreds of people appear and race towards the border, causing the immigration officers to hide in their truck. Rudy, Dolores, and their friends are able to walk into the United States.

== Cast ==
- Cheech Marin as Rudy Robles
- Paul Rodriguez as Javier
- Daniel Stern as Jimmy
- Kamala Lopez as Dolores
- Jan-Michael Vincent as McCalister
- Lupe Ontiveros as Mrs. Robles
- Alma Martinez as Gloria
- Neith Hunter as Marcie, The Redhead
- Larry Blackmon as Slick Dude
- Tito Larriva as Oscar
- Terrence Evans as Immigration Officer
- Tony Plana as Feo
- Eddie Barth as Lester
- Del Zamora as What’s Happening Boys
- Jason Scott Lee as What’s Happening Boys

Although Tommy Chong did not have a role in the film, he appears in a comedic scene as a portrait of Jesus Christ above an answering machine.

== Production ==
Following the success of Cheech & Chong's 1985 single "Born in East L.A.", a parody of Bruce Springsteen's "Born in the U.S.A." written by Cheech Marin, Frank Price, at the time a development executive at Universal Pictures, called Marin, whom he had known from having previously worked at Columbia Pictures, where Cheech & Chong had made the films Nice Dreams and Things Are Tough All Over. Price suggested that the song would make a good film, but without Tommy Chong's involvement. With the deterioration of Marin's comedy partnership with Chong, Marin signed a contract with Universal to write, direct and star in Born in East L.A.

Production commenced in Tijuana, Mexico, where the crew faced difficulty filming from the Mexican government. Actor Tony Plana (Feo) described Cheech Marin as a collaborative director, saying, "He was open to ideas, and finding the socially relevant insight into what we were doing, as well as finding the comedy." Marin and Plana worked together on developing the character, with Plana stating, "At the time, we had a couple of religious scandals going on, such as Jim Bakker and Jimmy Swaggart — preachers who sinned publicly. We wanted to satirize them a little bit. We turned Feo into a guy who extorts money in the name of Jesus." Plana also improvised much of his dialogue, including "You don’t have to thank me, you just have to pay me."

Also improvised was the scene with Marin standing outside the bar; the people that walked past him, Marin claims, were not extras, and their reactions were real.

During shooting, the film's producer, Peter MacGregor-Scott, was interviewed by a Mexican radio station, where he called for extras to come to the set to appear in the movie, where they would receive American scale pay, lunch and transportation paid for by the production.

== Release ==
Between the greenlighting and production of Born in East L.A., Frank Price was fired by Universal due to the failure of Howard the Duck, which was blamed on Price. As a result of Price's departure from the studio, Universal chose to spend little money publicizing Born in East L.A., as Price was the only executive who supported the project.

Ultimately, according to Marin, the film was the second-highest grossing release in its opening week. The film also increased Marin's popularity among the Latino community. However, the movie dropped by 40% in its second week at the box office. Still, Born in East L.A. proved to be a financial success. During release, Marin traveled to Havana, Cuba to present the film as an official entry at the Havana Film Festival.

According to Marin, he also received praise from Richard Pryor, who Marin says left him a phone message stating, "I went in not expecting much and was blown away. You made a great film. You should be proud."

=== Critical response ===
Kevin Thomas of the Los Angeles Times wrote, "Born in East L.A. is an across-the-board winner" and said that it had "more energy and drive" than La Bamba.

More negative response, however, came from critic Richard Harrington of The Washington Post, who wrote:

The filming is often flat, as is much of the acting. In fact, the short musical video of "Born in East L.A." is far superior to the film.

Caryn James, film critic for The New York Times, wrote:

Born in East L.A. is enormously good-natured—exactly the wrong tone for a comedy that needs all the rambunctious lunacy it can get. Instead, this story of an American mistakenly deported to Mexico as an illegal alien is amiable and plodding, the very last things you'd expect from Cheech, with or without Chong.

=== Accolades ===
- Havana Film Festival: Winner, Best Production Design & Best Screenplay; 1987.
- Havana Film Festival: 3rd Place, Grand Coral Prize, Cheech Marin; 1987.

== Home media and alterations ==
An extended version of the film was produced for television, containing a longer, alternate ending.

The film was released in VHS and DVD format. Shout Factory released it on Blu-ray under their Shout Select banner on March 19, 2019. The Blu-ray edition included new interviews with Cheech Marin, Paul Rodriguez and Kamala Lopez, an audio commentary by Marin, the trailer, the theatrical cut in high definition and the extended television version in standard definition and in 4:3 (1.33:1) aspect ratio, although High Def Digest reported that the television cut was presented in widescreen at 1.85:1.
