= Silent Night, Deadly Night 3: Better Watch Out! =

1989 film by Monte Hellman

- Promotional release poster
- Directed by: Monte Hellman
- Screenplay by: Carlos Laszlo
- Story by: Carlos Laszlo; Monte Hellman; Arthur Gorson
- Produced by: Arthur Gorson
- Starring: Richard Beymer; Bill Moseley; Samantha Scully; Eric Da Re; Laura Harring; Elizabeth Hoffman; Robert Culp
- Cinematography: Josep M. Civit
- Edited by: Monte Hellman; Ed Rothkowitz
- Music by: Steven Soles
- Production company: Quiet Films
- Distributed by: International Video Entertainment
- Release date: November 17, 1989
- Running time: 90 minutes
- Country: United States
- Language: English

Silent Night, Deadly Night 3: Better Watch Out! (stylized onscreen as Silent Night, Deadly Night III: Better Watch Out!) is a 1989 American slasher film written and directed by Monte Hellman. A direct-to-video release, the film is the second sequel to the 1984 film Silent Night, Deadly Night and centers around the Christmas-obsessed killer Ricky Caldwell awakening from a coma and stalking a blind teenager with psychic powers, while she travels to her grandmother's house for the Christmas holiday with her brother and his girlfriend. It was the last to follow the storyline set by the previous two films, with the next two films in Initiation (1990) and The Toy Maker (1991) serving as standalone entries.

== Plot ==
After being shot down by police, the infamous Santa Claus Killer Richard "Ricky" Caldwell is left comatose for six years, with a transparent dome affixed to his head by the doctors in order to repair his damaged skull. Wanting to contact Ricky, the eccentric Dr. Newbury begins using a blind clairvoyant girl named Laura Anderson to try to reach out to him. One Christmas Eve, after a particularly traumatic session with Newbury, Laura begins to regret her participation in his experiment, but Newbury tries to convince her to keep trying, saying that they can talk more after Laura returns home from visiting her grandmother over the holiday. After Laura is picked up from the hospital by her older brother Chris, a drunk hospital employee dressed as Santa Claus wanders into Ricky's room and begins taunting him, rousing Ricky back to consciousness. Killing the Santa impersonator, Ricky escapes from the hospital, taking a letter opener with him after killing a receptionist as well.

Picked up from a session with her psychiatrist, Laura is introduced by her brother to his new girlfriend, a flight attendant named Jerri, whom Laura dislikes. As the trio heads off to Granny's, they overlook Ricky (who can hear Laura thanks to their mental link) following them. Acquiring a truck and some fuel after murdering a motorist and a gas station attendant, Ricky makes it to Granny's first. Believing Ricky is simply an unfortunate vagrant, Granny tries befriending him but is killed when Ricky is provoked at the sight of a Christmas gift she offers him. Lieutenant Connely and Newbury find the two staff members butchered by Ricky at the hospital. They begin trying to track Ricky down, realizing he is drawn towards Laura after surveillance camera footage shows him uttering her name.

Reaching Granny's house, Laura feels something is wrong. Chris ignores her suspicions, who believes Granny may have just gone off for a walk. When Granny fails to show up and the car is found sabotaged, the group become very worried, with Chris and Jerri deciding to go out and look for Granny. Laura senses Ricky staring at her through the window and screams, bringing Chris and Jerri back to the house. After discovering the phone is dead and her picture is missing, Laura realizes it must be Ricky who is after her moments before Ricky punches through the door and begins throttling Jerri. She is saved when Chris stabs Ricky in the arm. Elsewhere, when Connely leaves the car to urinate, Newbury drives off, intending to try to reason with or trap Ricky, not wanting his experiment to go to waste by having Connely kill him.

Armed with an old shotgun, Chris, Laura, and Jerri go out searching for aid, but are ambushed by Ricky, who stabs Chris in the chest. While Laura and Jerri run back to the house, Newbury finds Ricky. At first, Ricky is uninterested in Newbury but is drawn close when Newbury plays a tape of one of his and Laura's sessions. As Ricky reaches out to him, Newbury, believing the tape had some kind of calming effect, grabs Ricky's hand, only to be stabbed in the stomach. Laura and Jerri barricade the door at the house, but Ricky still manages to break in. While looking for a gun, Ricky kills Jerri, and her body is found seconds later by Laura. Ricky approaches, allowing Laura to touch his face. Enraged when Laura flees in terror after feeling his artificial skullcap, Ricky chases after her. In the basement, Laura is encouraged by a vision of Granny, whose body she finds hanging from the ceiling before knocking the light out. Laura is easily knocked aside trying to attack Ricky. As Ricky begins choking her, Laura is saved when Chris appears and shoots Ricky with a shotgun. Unfortunately, the shotgun fires blanks, and the unharmed Ricky snatches it from Chris and uses it to choke him to death. Ricky then moves in to finish off Laura, but she grabs a piece of a broken stick and holds it in front of her at the last second, and Ricky impales himself.

Reaching the house with backup, Connely finds the dying Newbury before discovering Laura cradling her brother's body in the house. Driven away by Connely as Ricky is rushed to the hospital by paramedics, Laura wishes the lieutenant a "Merry Christmas" before having a vision of Ricky in a suit breaking the fourth wall as he states, "... And a Happy New Year".

== Cast ==
- Samantha Scully as Laura Anderson
- Bill Moseley as Ricky Caldwell
- Richard Beymer as Dr. Newbury
- Eric Da Re as Chris Anderson
- Laura Harring (credited as Laura Herring) as Jerri
- Robert Culp as Lieutenant Connely
- Elizabeth Hoffman as Granny Anderson
- Richard C. Adams as Santa
- Melissa Hellman as Dr. Newbury's Assistant
- Isabel Cooley as Hospital Receptionist
- Leonard Mann as Laura's Psychiatrist
- Carlos Palomino as Truck Driver
- Marc Dietrich as Craig
- Jim Ladd as Newscaster
- Richard N. Gladstein as Detective
- Tamela Song as Nurse
- Michael Ameen as Coroner
- Jeremiah Sird as Garbage Dave

Archive footage

- Eric Freeman as Ricky Caldwell
  - Melissa Best as Infant Ricky
- Ron Moriarity as Detective
- Nadya Wynd as Sister Mary
- Jonathan Best as Billy Chapman 5-year-old
- Tara Buckman as Ellie Chapman
- Geoff Hansen as Jim Chapman
- Charles Dierkop as Killer Santa Claus

== Production ==
At a screening at the Alamo Drafthouse in Austin, Texas, in July 2008, Hellman introduced the film, saying he thought it was his best work (though not his best film). His esteem for the work was partly due, he said, to the speed at which the entire project was put together. The original script was thrown out and rewritten in one week, starting in March.

== Release ==
=== Home media ===
International Video Entertainment released the film on VHS, while Image Entertainment released it on laserdisc.

Lions Gate Entertainment released the film along with its sequels, Silent Night, Deadly Night 4: Initiation and Silent Night, Deadly Night 5: The Toy Maker as a three-disc set on December 1, 2009. They are presented in full screen format with no special features included.

Lionsgate re-released the film to DVD on January 4, 2011, in a "4-Film Collection" set along with My Best Friend Is a Vampire, Repossessed and Slaughter High.

On December 13, 2022, Silent Night, Deadly Night 3: Better Watch Out! was released in a Blu-ray box set with Silent Night, Deadly Night 4: Initiation and Silent Night, Deadly Night 5: The Toy Maker through Lionsgate's Vestron Video Collector's Series.

== Reception ==
Silent Night, Deadly Night 3 received mostly negative reviews from critics upon its release. TV Guide awarded the film one out of five stars, writing, "Hellman has a flair for chaotic camera angles and handles the film's cinematic references quite nicely, but the whole thing lacks suspense, is slowly paced, and badly acted." Alan Jones of the Radio Times gave the film a similar rating of one out of five stars. Although Jones noted that it was a slight improvement from its predecessors, he criticized the film's lack of suspense, and inventive murders, calling the whole film "tedious". Fred Beldin from Allmovie wrote that the film, "stretches the original plot line so thin that it snaps, with logical lapses and continuity gaffes galore, but because of so much damage and stupidity, Silent Night, Deadly Night 3: Better Watch Out! emerges as the most entertaining entry in the series."

== Sequel ==
A sequel titled Silent Night, Deadly Night 4: Initiation, was released in 1990.
