= Neith Hunter =

American model and actress (born 1960)

- Born: Neith Andrina Hunter; San Francisco, California, U.S.
- Occupations: Actor, model
- Years active: 1986–1999
- Spouse: Warren Fahy (m. 2009)
- Children: 1

Neith Andrina Hunter is an American former model and actress. She began her modeling career in the 1980s in her home town of San Francisco, California, where she was discovered as a teen by John Casablancas; she was the first graduate of his exclusive model training center. French couturier Hubert de Givenchy offered her an exclusive contract to work for his House of Givenchy in Paris.

She is well known for playing Marcie (better known as "The redheaded woman in the green dress") in the film Born in East L.A. She would later appear in several other films, including Fright Night 2 (1988), Silent Night, Deadly Night 4: Initiation (1990), and Silent Night, Deadly Night 5: The Toy Maker (1991).

== Career ==
In the early-1980s, Hunter established herself as a muse of French-based fashion designer Diane Pernet. Hunter went on to become an international model on runways and in print appearing regularly in publications such as Vogue Italia and Victoria's Secret catalogs. Neith worked with photographers Gian Paolo Barbieri, Albert Watson, Sheila Metzner, Arthur Elgort, Guy Bourdin, Helmut Newton, Mario Testino, Irving Penn, Antonio Guccioni, Matthew Rolston and Steven Meisel. Returning to the states, Neith modeled in New York City for American Vogue and became the signature model for avant-garde designer and fashion journalist, Diane Pernet, and worked extensively with photographer Herb Ritts.

She studied acting with Daniel Mann in the mid-1980s, and relocated to Los Angeles. Working with Ritts, Hunter collaborated on the iconic image, Neith with Tumbleweed, for his book, Pictures, as well as, Neith with Shadows and images for Ritts' book, Men / Women. Neith also appeared in books by photographers Matthew Rolston and Gian Paolo Barbieri for Vogue Italia.

Helmut Newton introduced Neith to master sculptor, Robert Graham. Neith became Graham's muse and the two were a couple, during which time Graham sculpted, sketched and photographed Neith for such installations as the Duke Ellington memorial in Central Park and Study for Column 1, in the Rolfe Courtyard, at UCLA.

Hunter would later appear in films and television as an actress making her film debut in Born in East L.A. (1987). Other films include Less than Zero (1987), Fright Night Part 2 (1988), Silent Night, Deadly Night 4: Initiation (1990), and Silent Night, Deadly Night 5: The Toy Maker (1991).

== Personal life ==
Hunter attended the California Institute of the Arts and graduated with a BFA degree in studio art in 2002. She has one child with songwriter Andrew Scandal and was married to author Warren Fahy in 2009.

== Filmography ==
=== Film ===
Year	Title	Role	Notes
1987	Born in East L.A.	Marcie	
1987	Near Dark	Lady in Car	
1987	Less than Zero	Alana	
1988	Fright Night Part 2	Young Admirer	
1990	Silent Night, Deadly Night 4: Initiation	Kim Levitt	
1991	Inside Out	Angela	Segment "The Diaries"
1991	Silent Night, Deadly Night 5: The Toy Maker	Kim Levitt	
1995	Carnosaur 2	Joanne Galloway	
1995	Gentlemen's Bet	Lauren Bernard	
1996	Red Shoe Diaries 6: How I Met My Husband	Alice	
1999	Liar's Poker	Brooke	

=== Television ===
Year	Title	Role	Notes
1986	Sledge Hammer!	Doll	1 Episode
1987	Miami Vice	Trace	1 Episode
1988	Nightingales	Julie	Television film
1990–1991	One Life to Live	Laura Jean Ellis	
1992–1996	Red Shoe Diaries	Daughter / Alice	2 Episodes
1994	Jonathan Stone: Threat of Innocence	Nora Walsh	Television film
1994–1995	Silk Stalkings	Elise / Gayla Everett	3 Episodes
1995	In the Name of Love: A Texas Tragedy	Elaine Phelps	Television film
