= Only You (1992 film) =

1992 film by Betty Thomas

- Theatrical release poster
- Directed by: Betty Thomas
- Written by: Wayne Allan Rice
- Produced by: Morrie Eisenman; Wayne Allan Rice
- Starring: Andrew McCarthy; Helen Hunt; Kelly Preston
- Cinematography: Bryan England
- Edited by: Peter Teschner
- Music by: Peter Rodgers Melnick
- Production companies: Dayjob Films; Highlight Communications; Pro Filmworks
- Distributed by: Live America
- Release date: May 23, 1992
- Running time: 85 minutes
- Country: United States
- Language: English

Only You is a 1992 comedy film starring Andrew McCarthy, Kelly Preston, and Helen Hunt. It was directed by Betty Thomas in her directorial debut.

== Plot ==
Clifford Godfrey is a doll's house designer who is dumped by his fiancée a few hours before they are to depart for a vacation in Mexico. Clare Enfield, a travel agent, informs Cliff that his tickets are non-refundable. Upset, Cliff goes to a bar where he meets Amanda Hughes, a woman recently dumped by her rich boyfriend Max after he reunited with his estranged wife. She agrees to travel along with Cliff to Mexico.

When Amanda sobers up the following morning, she has no recollection of sleeping with or traveling with Cliff to Mexico. Despite her initial reservations, he convinces Amanda to stay with him for the duration of the getaway. During their vacation, she continually flirts with and then rejects Cliff, manipulating him and having him take her on a shopping spree at the resort as well as an expensive dinner, where she pays little attention to Cliff and flirts with other men.

During dinner at the hotel, Cliff runs into Clare again, who is photographing the restaurant for a travel brochure of the resort, and thanks her for not allowing him a refund. After dinner, Amanda leads Cliff to a Jacuzzi pool where she asks him to strip and wait for her in the water while she goes back to retrieve a missing earring. While he waits, Amanda flirts with various men at the bar. Amanda is a no-show once again after Cliff returns to the hotel room and draws a romantic bubble bath, falling asleep. He now begins to see Amanda for the shallow gold digger she is.

Eventually Cliff and Clare begin a romance, only to have it disturbed by Amanda throughout the vacation.

== Cast ==
- Andrew McCarthy as Clifford Godfrey
- Kelly Preston as Amanda Hughes
- Helen Hunt as Clare Enfield
- Daniel Roebuck as Marty
- Joel Murray as Bert
- Reni Santoni as Reuben the Bartender
- Pepe Serna as Dock Official
- Denny Dillon as Sunray Tours Travel Agent
