= Dark Tower (1987 film) =

1987 film by Freddie Francis

- VHS cover art
- Directed by: Freddie Francis (as Ken Barnett)
- Screenplay by: Robert J. Avrech; Ken Blackwell; Ken Wiederhorn
- Story by: Robert J. Avrech
- Produced by: John R. Bowey; David Witz; Sandy Howard
- Starring: Michael Moriarty; Jenny Agutter; Theodore Bikel; Carol Lynley; Anne Lockhart; Kevin McCarthy
- Cinematography: Gordon Hayman
- Edited by: Tom Merchant
- Music by: Stacy Widelitz
- Production company: Sandy Howard Productions
- Distributed by: Fries Distribution Company (US)
- Release dates: October 29, 1987 (premiere MIFED (Mercato internazionale del film e del documentario)); February 1, 1989 (US)
- Running time: 91 minutes
- Countries: United States; United Kingdom
- Languages: English; Spanish

Dark Tower is a 1987 supernatural horror film directed by Freddie Francis and starring Michael Moriarty, Jenny Agutter, Theodore Bikel, Carol Lynley, Kevin McCarthy and Anne Lockhart. It centers on a high-rise building haunted by a malicious presence.

The film had a troubled production, with Freddie Francis disowning the final cut and crediting under the pseudonym Ken Barnett. This was his final film as director, before he returned to cinematography full-time. It premiered at the MIFED Film Festival in October 1987, and was released direct-to-video in the United States in February 1989.

== Plot ==
After a window washer plunges to his death from a high-rise, several people come to investigate, including security consultant Dennis Randall. He cannot locate a problem, but decides to investigate further when more gruesome deaths take place inside and around the office building. His investigations appear to show a sinister force behind all the deaths, a supernatural entity.

== Cast ==
- Michael Moriarty as Dennis Randall
  - Doug Jones as ghost Dennis Randall (uncredited)
- Jenny Agutter as Carolyn Page
- Carol Lynley as Tilly
- Theodore Bikel as Max Gold
- Kevin McCarthy as Sergie
- Anne Lockhart as Elaine
- Patch Mackenzie as Maria
- Robert Sherman as Williams
- Rick Azulay as Charlie
- Ramiro Oliveros as Joseph
- Jordi Batalla as Mueller
- Juame Ross as Beck
- Monica Fatjo as Rebecca
- Juan Ramon Romani as Philip Page
- Mara Bador as Rebecca's mother

== Production ==
Ken Wiederhorn's script for Dark Tower, from a story by Robert J. Avrech, was made as a film by producer Tom Fox using his production company Greenfox Films in collaboration with Howard International Pictures. Wiederhorn had been intended to direct, but lost the opportunity when financing took longer than expected to come through which coincided with Wiederhorn dealing with personal issues that also forced his withdrawal from the project. However, Fox eventually offered Wiederhorn the opportunity to write and direct Return of the Living Dead Part II. Wiederhorn did retain a contractually-obligated executive producer's credit on the final film.

Several online sources (including IMDb and Turner Classic Movies) claims Wiederhorn was the original director, and was replaced by Freddie Francis mid-shoot. However, Wiederhorn denied this in an interview with Flashback Files, stating that he was never on-set and had never seen the finished film. The film was shot on location in Barcelona. The film features one of the earliest on-screen appearances of actor Doug Jones, who plays the ghostly form of Dennis Randall.

Freddie Francis had become disillusioned with directing as he no longer wished to do cheap horror films and preferred working as a cinematographer on larger projects. Sandy Howard called Francis informing him they had lost Wiederhorn with production scheduled to begin in three weeks and after liking the script agreed to direct the film. After accepting the position, Francis had to deal with various production issues such as original stars Roger Daltrey and Lucy Gutteridge dropping out and a lawsuit by Howard against three film companies that failed to provide financing resulting in Francis needing to cut corners further than expected. According to Francis, the reason Daltrey and Gutteridge departed the project was because Daltrey was not able to give a good performance and Gutteridge was struggling with the material (though Francis said she was better than Daltrey and was possibly being dragged down by him). Howard agreed to let Daltrey and Gutteridge go and Francis hired Michael Moriarty and Jenny Agutter as their replacements.

A number of plot aspects, such as the character of Dennis Randall (Michael Moriarty) suffering from recurring nightmares of being pushed from the top of a tall building and a climax involving Randall and Carolyn Page (Jenny Agutter) on the building's roof that would payoff the plot point, were altered after shooting had completed with the producer adding several new scenes and special effects sequences. The post-production and re-shooting of the effects sequences were supposed to be supervised by Francis but Howard ended up editing the final film without Francis, who was dissatisfied with the effects sequences and the final result.

Due to his unhappiness with the quality of the film, Francis insisted his name be removed from the film with Howard choosing to replace it with the pseudonym Ken Barnett. Francis's dissatisfaction with the experience of making Dark Tower led to him returning to his primary role as a cinematographer. He never directed another feature film despite being offered directing jobs after Dark Tower. Two years after Dark Tower's premiere, he won an Academy Award for Best Cinematography for the film Glory at the 62nd Academy Awards.

== Release ==
Dark Tower premiered on October 29, 1987 at the MFED Film Festival in Italy. It had theatrical runs in Europe throughout 1988. The film was not released theatrically in the United States and instead was released to home video in February 1989.

== Reception ==
TV Guide awarded the film one out of five stars, calling it a "dull, talky, and incoherent haunted-skyscraper suspense thriller."
