= A House in the Hills =

1993 American thriller film

- Directed by: Ken Wiederhorn
- Starring: Michael Madsen; Helen Slater; Jeffrey Tambor
- Music by: Richard Einhorn
- Distributed by: LIVE Entertainment
- Release date: 1993
- Running time: 87 minutes
- Country: United States
- Language: English

A House in the Hills is a 1993 romantic thriller film directed by Ken Wiederhorn. It stars Michael Madsen and Helen Slater.

== Plot ==
Alex is an aspiring actress, working as a waitress to make ends meet while she prepares to audition for a soap opera. To earn some extra money, she agrees to house-sit the home of a wealthy couple for the weekend.

The couple let Alex know that a robbery and murder has recently taken place at the house next door. Although she pretends to be unconcerned, Alex is understandably on edge when a stranger, Mickey, turns up at the house. He is a thief who holds her captive, but has a way about him that attracts Alex as well.

== Cast ==
- Michael Madsen as Mickey
- Helen Slater as Alex Weaver
- Jeffrey Tambor as Willie
- James Laurenson as Ronald Rankin
- Elyssa Davalos as Sondra Rankin
