= Ken Wiederhorn =

American film director

- Born: July 6, 1945 (age 81); United States
- Education: Columbia University
- Occupations: Film director, screenwriter

Ken Wiederhorn (born 1945) is an American former news and documentary editor at CBS and film and television director, known mainly for the horror films Shock Waves and Return of the Living Dead Part II. Other features include Eyes of a Stranger, Meatballs II, and A House in the Hills. He also directed multiple episodes of 21 Jump Street, Dark Justice, and Freddy's Nightmares. Documentaries include Mission In Mississippi, Breaking Vegas, US Marshals; The Real Story, Hunt for Amazing Treasure and Fugitive Task Force.

He and fellow Columbia School of the Arts student, Reuben Trane, won the first Student Academy Award in the Drama category for their thesis film Manhattan Melody.

== Career ==
According to a 2013 interview, Ken Wiederhorn was working as a film editor at CBS, the news and documentary unit. His career ambition was to become a documentary producer. When there happened to be a break in his work schedule, he took an offer from his fellow Columbia School of the Arts student Reuben Trane to direct a feature film down in Florida. Trane had secured financing. The only requirement the investors had, was that they deliver a horror film, because they had heard horror films have a better chance of making their money back. After Wiederhorn had finished making Shock Waves, he went back to work at CBS. When his colleagues at CBS found out that he had directed a horror film, he noticed that they "had a tough time processing that". Wiederhorn said: "If you wanted to be a producer of CBS documentaries in those days, it was almost absolutely necessary to have a degree in journalism, which I didn’t have. I was just working my way up. If they saw me as a horror director, I knew that would not go well for my career."

Wiederhorn quit working at CBS and accepted an offer to direct King Frat, which he called "a terrible Animal House knock off". His next feature was the thriller Eyes of a Stranger, which led to an offer by Brian De Palma to write and direct Body Double, based on De Palma's treatment. Ultimately, De Palma decided to write and direct the film himself. Wiederhorn then accepted an offer to direct a comedy called Call Me Meathead, which featured an alien creature which befriends some children on a summer camp. When the film was finished, the producers sold the film to TriStar, which retitled the movie Meatballs Part II. According to Wiederhorn, the audience "had no idea they were being bamboozled".

His next film was Return of the Living Dead Part II, which, much like Meatballs Part II, started out as an original horror comedy script that Wiederhorn had written about "a kid who has a run-in with a bunch of zombies". He was offered to make the film on the condition they call it Return of the Living Dead Part II. Wiederhorn added Thom Mathews and James Karen to the cast, who also starred in the first Return of the Living Dead, to create "a connection that would otherwise not be there".

Wiederhorn claims he did not direct Dark Tower: " I wrote some of that film, but never even set foot on the set."

Wiederhorn's favorite of his films is A House in the Hills: "In my opinion it’s the only really good movie I’ve made."

== Filmography ==
=== Films ===
| Year | Title | Director | Writer | Producer | Notes |
|---|---|---|---|---|---|
| 1973 | Manhattan Melody | Yes | Yes | No | Short film |
| 1977 | Shock Waves | Yes | Yes | No | Directorial Debut |
| 1979 | King Frat | Yes | No | No | Role: Ambulance Attendant |
| 1981 | Eyes of a Stranger | Yes | No | No | |
| 1984 | Meatballs Part II | Yes | No | No | |
| 1988 | Return of the Living Dead Part II | Yes | Yes | No | |
| 1989 | Dark Tower | No | Yes | Executive | |
| 1993 | A House in the Hills | Yes | Yes | Yes | Role: Anchor |

=== Television ===
| Year | Title | Director | Writer | Producer | Notes |
|---|---|---|---|---|---|
| 1981 | A Single Light | No | No | Yes | Television film |
| 1988-1990 | Freddy's Nightmares | Yes | Story | No | 7 episodes (story for episode "The Art of Death") |
| 1989-1990 | 21 Jump Street | Yes | No | No | 2 episodes |
| 1991-1992 | Dark Justice | Yes | No | No | 6 episodes |
| 1998 | US Marshals, The Real Story | Yes | Yes | Yes | Episode "Inside the L.A. Office", documentary series |
| 2004-2005 | Breaking Vegas | No | No | Yes | Documentary series, 12 episodes + Special |
