= Arthur Gorson =

American film producer

- Born: New York City, U.S.
- Occupations: Film and record producer

Arthur Gorson, also known as Arthur H. Gorson, is an American film producer. He also has experience as a cinematographer, screenwriter, cameraman and record producer. He is currently (2024) active in TV, film and commercial production. As a record producer, he produced over 20 albums for major labels with artists such as Golden Earring, Phil Ochs and Tom Rush. His photographic work with artists such as Bob Marley is widely published. A series of his photos were included in the authorized documentary Marley directed by Kevin Mcdonald (The Last King of Scotland;as well as the 2023 50th Anniversary box-set of "Catch A Fire.".

== Biography ==
Gorson was born and raised in New York City. He was a student activist. American protest singer Philip Ochs noticed his organizational skills and invited him to be his manager. The Arthur H. Gorson Management Company began to represent Ochs and singers David Blue, Tom Rush, Jim & Jean, and Eric Andersen. He produced concerts at Carnegie Hall and (with Murray the K) was the first to present The Who and Cream in concert. He packaged his folk performers together and sent them on tours where they played at venues around the country. He expanded into record production, producing Blue's debut album and Rush's The Circle Game.

Gorson went on to head production companies based in New York; working in the areas of film production, soundtrack & post-production supervision, and concert production. He then relocated to Los Angeles where he assumed the position of feature producer for Dreamstreet, Inc., with offices at Universal and Paramount, and working with directors such as Tony Scott, Taylor Hackford and Andrei Konchalovsky. Gorson has multiple feature film credits as producer. These include Cronos, directed by Guillermo del Toro and shot by Academy Award winner Guillermo Navarro. Cronos won many awards including the Cannes Film Festival Grand Prix of Critic's Week and 9 Ariel del Oro awards (Mexico's Academy Awards). Better Watch Out!, directed by Monte Hellman and starring Robert Culp and Richard Beymer, was produced by Gorson from a story by Hellman, Gorson and Carlos Lazlo; it was distributed by Carolco/LIVE Entertainment with cable rights through HBO. He was a producer of the historical epic Cabeza de Vaca, directed by Nicolas Echevarria and made for American Playhouse Theatrical Films (US), IMCINE (Mexico) and Producciones Iguana (Mexico); the film had its world premiere in competition at the Berlin Film Festival. He is credited as executive producer (for US post-production) on Timur Bekmambetov's groundbreaking 2005 film Night Watch. That film broke all box office records in Russia. He had a long-running creative relationship with the late Jamaican filmmaker Perry Henzell (The Harder They Come) and is credited as executive producer on Henzell's 2019 released film No Place Like Home. His recent documentary The Roots of Reggae (produced with Wayne Jobson) had its U.S. premiere at the Palm Beach Film Festival. A Filmmaker's Odyssey had its international film festival premiere at the Santa Barbara Film Festival.

In the world of short-form work, Gorson's commercial credits include Seaworld Parks and Entertainment (6 years of campaigns for various parks), Century 21, Athos, California Lottery, LG Phones, Health Care, Mazda Automobiles, Frito-Lay, Gillette, Bank Imperial, Cutty Sark, Gatorade, Woolrich, Super Bock Beer, Veet, The Palms Hotel, Universal Orlando, Mortal Kombat, Mars Bars, and Tommy Hilfiger. He has produced over 50 top music videos for artists such as the Dave Matthews Band, Lisa Marie Presley, Evanescence, Marilyn Manson, Stevie Nicks, Ozzy Osbourne, Tommy Lee, Dr. Dre, Iron Maiden, Slayer, Everlast, Damian Marley, Daughtry, Shooter Jennings, Velvet Revolver, and Cypress Hill. He has recently produced a series of long-form interactive concert DVDs including Iron Maiden at Rock in Rio, Megadeth's Rude Awakening, Wu Tang Clan's 36 Chambers, and Ernest Ranglin's Order of Distinction. In these areas he has worked with directors such as Dean Karr, Zack Snyder, Patricia Riggen, Timur Bekmambetov, and Alejandro Toledo.

He supervised The Harder They Come: Collector's Edition for Shout!Factory, which was released on August 23, 2019. The three disc set includes five hours of original material (produced and directed by Arthur Gorson and David Garonzik. Filmed in Jamaica)the original material includes: five featuettes, and interviews with Ridley Scott and the original filmmakers. (It was chosen by the Los Angeles Times as "Best of 2019).

As of 2024, videos he produced with Dean Karr have received over 700 million combined views on YouTube. His work has received international recognition, including: Cannes Film Festival, Critics Week - Gold; Silver Telly Award; Saturn Film Award: Ariel del Oro; MuchMusic Award (Canada) for “Video of the Year”; VMA/MTV Awards; Billboard Awards; MVPA Awards; MTV Europe; Kodak Award. He is the recipient of multiple RIAA gold and platinum awards, as well as a British Video Association Award for "Rock in Rio" long-form DVD.

Gorson is currently Executive Producer at Wild Indigo, LLC.

== Music ==
- American Troubadour (producer)
- The Circle Game (producer)
- "When in Rome" music video (producer)
- Phil Ochs in Concert (concert producer)
- "Crash Into Me" music video (producer)
- "Sweet Dreams" music video (producer)
- "Rock in Rio" concert dvd (producer)
- "Wu Tang Clan" concert dvd (producer)
- "Harder They Come" music video (producer)
- "Stay" music video (producer)
- "Infinite Love" music video - short (producer - Jamaica)
- "See What Unfolds Steve Aoki" concert (producer)
- "It was Written" music video (producer)
- "Gravedigger" music video (producer)
- "Beautiful" music video (producer)

== Film ==
- Initiation: Silent Night, Deadly Night 4 (screenwriter)
- Silent Night, Deadly Night 3: Better Watch Out! (producer)
- Cronos (producer)
- Cabeza De Vaca (consulting producer)
- Night Watch (executive producer)
- No Place Like Home (producer)
- Roots of Reggae (producer)
- A Filmmaler's Odyssey (co-director, producer, writer)
