= Faust (surname) =

Faust is a surname of German origin, borne by the following people:

== Academics ==
- Albert Bernhardt Faust (1870–1951), scholar of German-American studies
- Aleksandra Faust, Serbian-American computer scientist, AI researcher, and technology executive
- Avraham Faust, Israeli archaeologist and professor at Bar-Ilan University
- Beatrice Faust (1939–2019), Australian author and women's activist
- David Faust (born 1955), author and president of Cincinnati Christian University
- Drew Gilpin Faust (born 1947), historian and president of Harvard University
- Johann Georg Faust (1480–1541), itinerant alchemist, astrologer and magician of the German Renaissance
- Johannes Faust (1832–1903), German entomologist
- Jurgen Faust (born 1955), German design academic

== Writers and artists ==
- Alban Faust (born 1960), luthier and player of traditional Swedish music
- Berthold Faust (born 1935), German nature artist
- Chad Faust (born 1980), Canadian actor, singer, film producer, film director, and screenwriter
- Chris Faust (born 1955), American landscape photographer
- Christa Faust (born 1969), American author
- Dinah Faust (1926–2023), German-born French actress and singer
- Frederick Schiller Faust (1892–1944), American author better known as Max Brand
- Georg Faust (born 1956), German cellist
- Gretchen Faust (born 1961), American contemporary artist, performer, art historian, and yoga instructor
- Irvin Faust (1924–2012), American author and educator
- Isabelle Faust (born 1972), German violinist
- Joe Clifford Faust (born 1957), American author
- Lauren Faust (born 1974), American animator who created My Little Pony: Friendship Is Magic
- Lotta Faust (1880–1910), American actress, dancer, and singer
- Lucy Faust (born 1986), American actress
- Luke Faust (born 1936), American folk musician
- Maria Faust (born 1979), Estonian jazz saxophonist
- Marina Faust (born 1950), Austrian artist
- Nancy Faust (born 1947), American organist
- Siegmar Faust (born 1944), German writer and human rights activist

== Athletes ==
- Andre Faust (born 1969), Canadian ice hockey player
- Brian Faust (born 1999), American track and field athlete
- Charlie Faust (1880–1915), American baseball pitcher
- Christopher Faust (born 1968), German hockey coach and trainer
- Dick Faust (1903–1955), American football player
- George Faust (1917–1993), American football player
- Gerry Faust (1935–2024), American football player and coach
- Hartmut Faust (born 1965), German sprint canoer
- Joe Faust (athlete) (born 1942), American high jumper
- Lisa Faust (born 1966), Canadian field hockey player
- Nick Faust (born 1993), American basketball player
- Rodrigo Faust (born 1995), Argentine footballer
- Rowley Faust (1899–1959), Australian rules footballer
- Wolfram Faust (born 1964), German sprint canoer

== Other people ==
- Alex Faust (born 1989), American television sportscaster
- Alfred Faust (1883–1961), German advertising executive, journalist and politician
- Charles L. Faust (1879–1928), American politician from Missouri
- Herbert Faust (1927–2023), German politician
- Jack Faust (attorney) (born 1932), American attorney and television broadcaster
- James E. Faust (1920–2007), American leader of The Church of Jesus Christ of Latter-day Saints
- Jean Satterthwaite Faust (born 1930), American women's rights activist
- Joe Faust (politician) (born 1940), American politician
- Leland Faust (born 1946), American financial advisor
- Martin Faust (disambiguation), various people
- Mimi Faust (born 1972), American reality television personality
- Tim Faust (born 1959), American politician
- William Faust (1929–1995), American politician from Michigan
