= Sylbert =

Sylbert is a surname. Notable people with the surname include:

- Anthea Sylbert (1939–2024), American costume designer
- Paul Sylbert (1928–2016), American production designer, art director and set designer
- Richard Sylbert (1928–2002), American production designer and art director
