= Sandra Giles =

American actress (1932–2016)

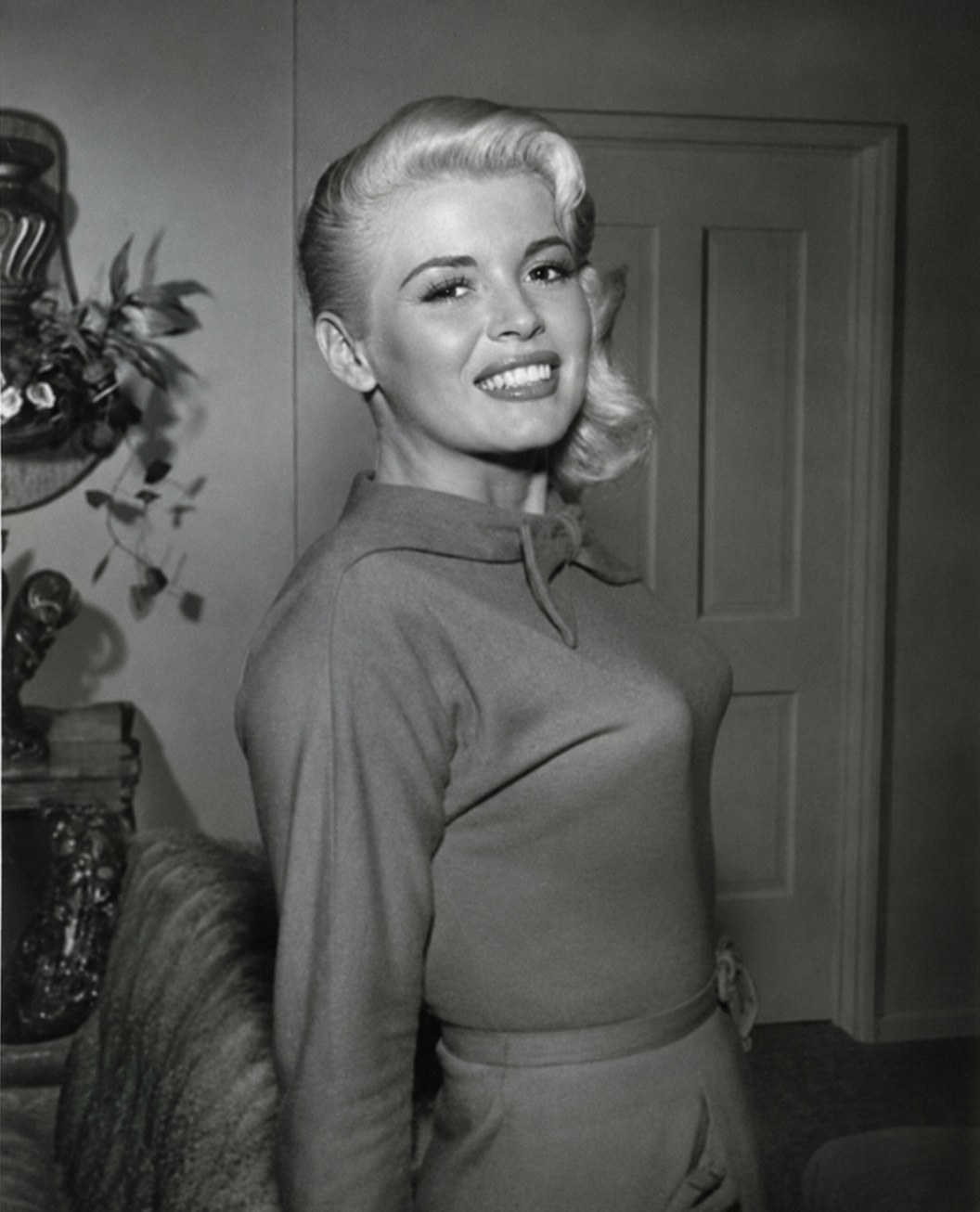
- Giles in The People's Choice, 1957
- Born: Lelia Bernice Giles; July 24, 1932; Hooker, Oklahoma, U.S.
- Died: December 25, 2016 (aged 84); Los Angeles, California, U.S.
- Occupation: Actress
- Children: 1

Sandra Giles, born Lelia Bernice Giles, (July 24, 1932 – December 25, 2016) was an American actress and model. She was best known for her film debut role in Daddy-O in 1958.

== Biography ==
Giles was raised in Hooker, Oklahoma, but moved to Los Angeles with her mother, who had recently divorced. (Other sources say that she came from San Antonio, Texas, or that she was "born in Oklahoma and brought up in San Antonio, Tex.") Later described by The Hollywood Reporter and other critics as a "blond bombshell", Giles was discovered by a press agent while working at Canter's delicatessen, which began her career as an actress and model. She later studied dramatics at Los Angeles City College.

Giles made her film debut in 1958's Daddy-O, starring alongside Dick Contino. In the film, her character, Jana Ryan, beat Contino's character in a drag race. She went on to appear in three more films in 1958 alone – The Matchmaker, A Lust to Kill, and Lost, Lonely and Vicious, in which she showed herself quite the dancer. Also in 1958, Giles made a memorable arrival at the film premiere of Teacher's Pet, starring Clark Gable and Doris Day, by arriving in a furry pink Cadillac convertible. Although she did not appear in the film, her appearance at its premiere brought her career considerable publicity, including a two–page article and spread in Life Magazine, titled "The Blond From Hooker – How to Become a Movie Star", in which she was photographed in a bubble bath.

Her other film roles included Black Spurs in 1965, Flareup in 1969, and Black Gunn in 1972, as well as appearing in one-off episodes of television series ranging from Columbo to The Odd Couple.

== Avco Embassy & The Steagle ==
In his 1974 book about making the movie The Steagle, Final Cut: The Making and Breaking of a Picture, writer-director Paul Sylbert wrote that he was pressured by Avco Embassy into casting Giles (whom he gave the pseudonym "Sally Wyles") in a major supporting role, even though she was totally inadequate for the part, lacking acting talent. Sylbert wrote that the production of the picture was made contingent on her being cast in the part, as it turned out she was the mistress of a top executive at Avco, the conglomerate that acquired Joseph E. Levine's Embassy Pictures in 1967.

Facing cancellation of The Steagle, he did cast her, with no intention of using her. Sylbert rescheduled the shooting of Giles' scenes to the latter part of the picture, then used another actress in the part. In his book, he writes that the film being taken away from him during the editing/preview process and being brutally recut was partially due to the producers' anger over him double-crossing them over Giles.

== Personal life ==
She dated tennis player Bobby Riggs during the 1970s and appeared with him in a guest spot on The Odd Couple.

She was close friends with fellow actresses Vikki Dougan, Pat Sheehan, Juli Reding, Sondra Scott, and Cathy Crosby.

She was married two times and had a daughter, singer Sandra Piller.

== Death ==
Giles died in Los Angeles from complications of bullous pemphigoid, an autoimmune disease affecting the skin, on December 25, 2016, at the age of 84.

== Filmography ==
=== Films ===
- 1958: Lost, Lonely and Vicious as Darlene
- 1958: Daddy-O as Jana Ryan
- 1958: The Matchmaker as Older Beauty
- 1959: A Lust to Kill as Belle
- 1963: It Happened at the World's Fair as Lily (uncredited cameo)
- 1965: Black Spurs as Sadie's girl
- 1967: Border Lust
- 1969: Flareup as Nikki
- 1972: Black Gunn as Prostitute
- 1973: The Mad Bomber as Checkout Girl

=== Television ===
- 1973: The Odd Couple
- 1978: Are You in the House Alone? as Hostess
- 1979: Crisis in Mid-Air as Darlene
- 1981: Crazy Times as Esther
- 1990: Columbo: Murder in Malibu as Sixth Woman
