= Thomas Stanford (film editor) =

American film editor

- Born: Thomas Gerard Stanford; November 18, 1924; Düsseldorf, Germany
- Died: December 23, 2017 (aged 93); Santa Fe, New Mexico, U.S.
- Occupation: Film editor
- Years active: 1955–1988

Thomas Gerald Stanford (1924 – 2017) was an American film and television editor with about sixteen feature film credits. He won the Academy Award for Best Film Editing at the 34th Academy Awards for the film West Side Story (1961), which was only his second credit as an editor. Long afterwards, West Side Story was listed as the 38th best-edited film of all time in a 2012 survey of members of the Motion Picture Editors Guild. The film's editing is also featured in Louis Giannetti's textbook Understanding Movies.

Stanford's first credit as an editor was for Suddenly, Last Summer (1959), which was a major production by the independent producer Sam Spiegel. Excepting a 1955 film version of the opera Don Giovanni, any earlier work as an assistant editor wasn't credited. This was typical in the 1950s. Stanford edited three films with director Sydney Pollack, including Pollack's first feature The Slender Thread (1965). Stanford's work on Pollack's feature Jeremiah Johnson (1972) drew the attention of critic Gene Siskel, who wrote "Oddly enough, it is the violent scenes, the ones that don't work within the story, in which Pollack excels. Jeremiah's battle with a pack of wolves, and, later, a pack of Crow Indians, are stunning examples of direction and editing." In the 1960s, Stanford edited two films directed by Mark Rydell, including his debut The Fox (1967). Stanford's last film before his retirement was Split Decisions (1988).

He attended Malvern College from 1939-1942.

Stanford died at the age of 93 in 2017.

== Filmography ==
This filmography is based on the listing at the Internet Movie Database.

Editor
| Year | Film | Director | Notes |
|---|---|---|---|
| 1959 | Suddenly, Last Summer | Joseph L. Mankiewicz | |
| 1961 | West Side Story | Robert Wise; Jerome Robbins | |
| 1963 | In the Cool of the Day | Robert Stevens | |
| 1964 | Emil and the Detectives | Peter Tewksbury | |
| 1965 | The Truth About Spring | Richard Thorpe | |
| 1965 | The Slender Thread | Sydney Pollack | First collaboration with Sydney Pollack |
| 1967 | Don't Make Waves | Alexander Mackendrick | |
| 1967 | The Fox | Mark Rydell | First collaboration with Mark Rydell |
| 1968 | Hell in the Pacific | John Boorman | |
| 1969 | The Reivers | Mark Rydell | Second collaboration with Mark Rydell |
| 1971 | The Steagle | Paul Sylbert | |
| 1972 | Jeremiah Johnson | Sydney Pollack | Second collaboration with Sydney Pollack |
| 1974 | The Yakuza | Sydney Pollack | Third collaboration with Sydney Pollack |
| 1979 | The Onion Field | Harold Becker | Uncredited |
| 1981 | The Legend of the Lone Ranger | William A. Fraker | |
| 1988 | Born to Race | James Fargo | |
| 1988 | Split Decisions | David Drury | |

Editorial department
| Year | Film | Director | Role |
|---|---|---|---|
| 1986 | Saving Grace | Robert M. Young | Additional editor |

Documentaries

Editor
| Year | Film | Director |
|---|---|---|
| 1980 | Pacific High | Michael Ahnemann |

Editorial department
| Year | Film | Director | Role |
|---|---|---|---|
| 1966 | The Crazy World of Laurel and Hardy | —N/a | Supervising editor |

TV documentaries

Editor
| Year | Film | Director |
|---|---|---|
| 1974 | The Yanks Are Coming | Ed Spiegel |

TV movies

Editor
| Year | Film | Director |
|---|---|---|
| 1977 | Mad Bull | Walter Doniger; Len Steckler |
| 1978 | Sergeant Matlovich vs. the U.S. Air Force | Paul Leaf |
| 1979 | Before and After | Kim Friedman |

Editorial department
| Year | Film | Director | Role |
|---|---|---|---|
| 1955 | Mozart's Don Giovanni | Paul Czinner | Assistant editor |

TV series

Editor
| Year | Title | Notes |
|---|---|---|
| 1960 | Route 66 | 1 episode |
| 1966 | Burke's Law | 2 episodes |
| 1966 | Walt Disney's Wonderful World of Color | 2 episodes |
| 1972−73 | Hec Ramsey | 2 episodes |
