= Steagle =

Steagle or Steagles may refer to:

- The Steagle, a 1971 American film
- Steagles, a former National Football League team
- Steagle Colbeagle the Eagle, a mascot of the Ontario Hockey League team the Saginaw Spirit; named for Stephen Colbert
