= If You Believe (film) =

1999 television film directed by Alan Metzger

- Written by: Anthea Sylbert; Richard Romanus
- Directed by: Alan Metzger
- Starring: Ally Walker; Hayden Panettiere; Tom Amandes
- Theme music composer: Stanley Clarke
- Country of origin: United States
- Original language: English

Production
- Producers: Paula Weinstein; Anthea Sylbert; Richard Romanus
- Running time: 2 hours (with commercials)

Original release
- Network: Lifetime Television
- Release: December 5, 1999

If You Believe is a 1999 American television film aired on Lifetime Television. It stars Ally Walker, Hayden Panettiere, and Tom Amandes. In the film, a Scrooge-like woman is visited by her "inner child," who helps her rediscover a zest for life. The film is a Spring Creek Production in association with Hearst Entertainment.

== Synopsis ==
Once-successful book editor Susan Stone who would choose to go to work on Thanksgiving weekend, suddenly gets a visit from her inner child in the form of a seven-year-old girl, Suzie, whom only she can see and hear. The inner child who does not want to go away until Susan is happy, keeps commenting on the merits of a potential love interest and teaches her how to playfully dance in her living room.

== Cast ==
- Ally Walker as Susan Stone
- Hayden Panettiere as Young Susan "Suzie" Stone and Alice Stone, Susan's niece
- Tom Amandes as Thom Weller
- Meredith McGeachie as Robin
- Andrew Tarbet as Bob Stone
- Jonathan Welsh as Dylan Lewis

== Nominations ==
- 2000 – Hayden Panettiere nominated for Young Artist Award in category of Best Performance in a TV Movie or Pilot for Young Actress Age Ten or Under
- 2001 – Anthea Sylbert and Richard Romanus nominated for WGA Award for Original Long Form

== See also ==
- List of Christmas films
- List of programs broadcast by Lifetime
