= Lilyan Chauvin =

French-American actress (1925–2008)

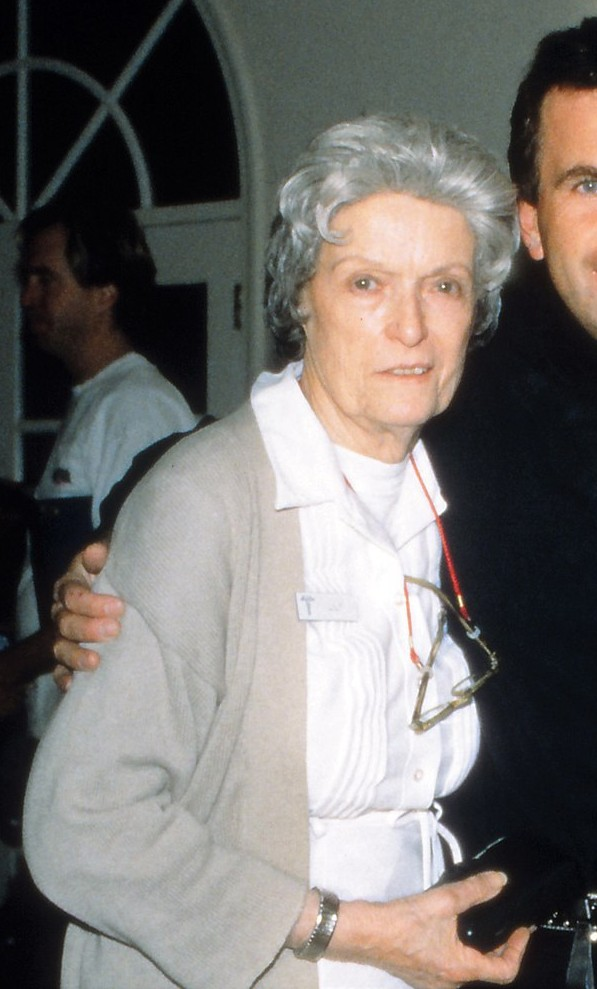
- Chauvin in 2004
- Born: Lilyan Zemoz; 6 August 1925; Paris, France
- Died: 26 June 2008 (aged 82); Los Angeles, California, U.S.
- Occupations: Actress; producer; director
- Years active: 1950–2007
- Spouse(s): Bernard J. Chauvin (m. 1946; div. 1953)

Lilyan Chauvin (/ˈlɪliɑːn ʃoʊˈvɑːn/; née Zemoz; 6 August 1925 – 26 June 2008) was a French-American actress, television host, director, writer, and acting teacher. A native of Paris, Chauvin began her career performing on French radio and onstage in England. She relocated to the United States in 1952 to pursue an acting career, and was initially cast in minor television parts before making her film debut in 1957.

Chauvin's career in American films spanned over 60 years, and largely consisted of supporting roles. Some of her credits include The Other Side of Midnight (1977), Private Benjamin (1980), the slasher film Silent Night, Deadly Night (1984), Predator 2 (1990), and Steven Spielberg's Catch Me If You Can (2002). She also had a prolific career in television, and guest-starred in such television series as The X-Files, Murder, She Wrote, Star Trek: Deep Space Nine, Friends, Magnum, P.I., Alias, Malcolm in the Middle, Baa Baa Black Sheep. The Man from U.N.C.L.E., McCloud, Perry Mason, and Ugly Betty.

In her later life, Chauvin taught acting and directing at the University of California, Los Angeles and the University of Southern California. She also served as the Vice President of Women in Film council. She died in Los Angeles in 2008 of complications resulting from congestive heart failure and breast cancer, the latter of which she battled for four decades.

== Early life ==
Chauvin was born in Paris, Île-de-France, France, to a French mother, Emilia Speltiens, and an Italian father, Pantion Pierre Zemoz. (Note: An article published in The Times of Hammond, Indiana, on June 3, 1963, says of Chauvin, "Her father, Pierre, although French-born, had become an American citizen.")

Chauvin began her career working in broadcasting in France. While under contract to a French radio station she had her heart set on becoming a lawyer; however her earnings soon exceeded that of her parents' and she gave serious consideration to making show business her way of life. She studied in Paris at the School of Cinema, and at the Jean-Louis Barrault School, also in Paris.

== Career ==
=== Early career and stage ===
Chauvin moved to New York City in 1952 and became a naturalized American citizen. She studied with Uta Hagen and at the Actors Studio in New York. Chauvin also attended the Berlitz school of Languages and took in American movies every day to improve her English. Already proficient in Spanish, German, Italian, and Russian, she soon became one of the school's top teachers and they sent her out to coach actors in the accents they needed for various roles.

Chauvin's European stage and Actors Equity theatre credits include Macbeth, Medea, Silk Stockings, Camille, and Three for Today. She began landing roles in New York television productions including TV's prestigious Studio One. Soon after she traveled to Los Angeles and found work in film and television.

=== Transition to film ===
Chauvin made her film acting debut in Letter from Cairo (1953), an episode of the long-running series Studio One. The following year she guest-starred in Crusader. Chauvin made her first motion picture appearance in Lost, Lonely and Vicious (1958) and later starred in Walk Like a Dragon (1960) and Bloodlust! (1961). She also appeared in the Elvis Presley films King Creole (1958) and Tickle Me (1965) and the Barbra Streisand film Funny Lady (1975). Other film credits include Yours, Mine and Ours (1968), The Mephisto Waltz (1971), The Other Side of Midnight (1977), Beyond Reason (1977), Private Benjamin (1980), Silent Night, Deadly Night (1984, as the sadistic Mother Superior), Born in East L.A. (1987), Bad Influence (1990), Predator 2 (1990), Angel Town (1990), Universal Soldier (1992), The Warlord: Battle for the Galaxy (1998), Five Aces (1999), The Man Who Wasn't There (2001) and Catch Me If You Can (2002).

Chauvin was a series regular on Days of Our Lives, Mission Impossible, General Hospital and Falcon Crest. Other television credits include “Jim Bowie’’ Adventures of Superman, Combat!, Baa Baa Black Sheep, Friends, ER, Star Trek: Deep Space Nine, Tyson, Malcolm in the Middle, Alias, CSI, Ugly Betty, The X-Files, and Murder She Wrote.

=== Directing ===
In the industry, Chauvin's talents are respected equally as a director and actress. Her DGA directing credits include The Young and the Restless, But She Can Type, Celebration 75 and Windows of Heaven. Chauvin directed productions of Last Summer at Bluefish Cove, Effigies, Seacliffe California, In My Minds Eye, The Happy Time and The Deepest Hunger.

== Other ventures ==
=== Teaching ===
In her later life, Chauvin became a prominent acting and directing coach in Los Angeles, teaching at the University of California, Los Angeles and the University of Southern California. Many of her techniques have become instrumental teaching tools within the industry and have provided inspiration to many other successful educators. As an author and educator she taught internationally at seminars as a keynote speaker, lecturer and adviser.

As the creator and show runner she co-produced and hosted the television series Hollywood Structured, a comprehensive guide to show business careers, Chauvin explored new facets of the industry each week through interviews with top professionals. The 64 episodes covered acting, directing, make up, documentary filmmaking, producing, music, comedy, cinematography, stunt coordinating, modeling, publicity, writing, dancing, sports announcing, production design, entertainment law, agency, casting, union, special effects and more.

Chauvin wrote Hollywood Scams & Survival Tactics, in which she shared many of her own experiences and survival tactics.

She taught acting, multi-cam cinematography and directing for over 10 years at USC and taught acting/directing at UCLA for two years. Some of Chauvin's acting students were Raquel Welch, Suzanne Somers, Margie Haber, Carly Schroeder, Kin and Wil Shriner, Jennifer Runyon, Kevin Nealon and Rex Steven Sikes. She was a technical advisor and dialogue coach at MGM and worked as a dialogue supervisor/drama coach at Warner Brothers. For many years she ran the Women in Film Director's Workshop which drew large numbers of people from the various aspects of filmmaking.

=== Still photography ===
Chauvin's work with stationary images included taking a photograph of author William Faulkner that was published in The Atlantic Monthly magazine and was to be used on dust jackets of Faulkner books.

== Accolades ==
Twice nominated for Emmy Awards (for The Young and the Restless and Baa Baa Black Sheep), Chauvin won the 1991 Angel Award for Hollywood Structured, which was co-produced by Chauvin, Julie Johnson and Irene Lamothe. Chauvin appeared weekly as the host on this cable program with, among others, Jacqueline Bisset, Linda Gray, Morey Amsterdam, Danny Glover, Henry Mancini, Anne Francis, Carmen Zapata and others.

== Affiliations ==
Chauvin was on the Women's Steering Committee of the Directors Guild of America and had over 35 credits as a DGA Director since 1979. She was a member of Screen Actors Guild, the Writers Guild of America, the American Federation of Television and Radio Artist and Equity. Committed to furthering women's causes, especially in the industry, Chauvin was a 39-year member of Women in Film. She served on the organization's Board five times, twice as the Board's vice president.

== Personal life ==
Chauvin was married to Bernard Chauvin, whom she divorced in Florida in 1953. She retained his surname for the remainder of her career. In the 1960s, Chauvin was diagnosed with breast cancer, which she would battle intermittently for the following four decades.

=== Death ===
Chauvin died at her Studio City, Los Angeles home on 26 June 2008, aged 82. Her death was attributed to complications from breast cancer and congestive heart disease.

== Filmography ==
=== Film ===
Year	Title	Role	Notes
1957	Ten Thousand Bedrooms	Reporter	Uncredited
1957	Silk Stockings	Sonia	Uncredited
1957	Tip on a Dead Jockey	Dolores	Uncredited
1957	Les Girls	A Dancer	Uncredited
1958	King Creole	Catherine	Uncredited
1958	The Perfect Furlough	French Nurse	
1958	Lost, Lonely and Vicious	Tanya Pernaud	
1959	The Man Who Understood Women		Uncredited
1959	The Wreck of the Mary Deare	Nun	Uncredited
1960	Walk Like a Dragon	Mme. Lili Raide	
1960	North to Alaska	Jenny Lamont	Uncredited
1961	Bloodlust!	Sandra Balleau	
1961	Back Street	Paris Airport Employee	
1962	The Four Horsemen of the Apocalypse	French Prisoner	Uncredited
1962	Two Weeks in Another Town	Bar Girl	Uncredited
1965	Tickle Me	Ronnie	
1968	Yours, Mine and Ours	French Actress On TV Screen	
1971	The Mephisto Waltz	Woman Writer	
1971	Machismo: 40 Graves for 40 Guns	Kate	
1975	Funny Lady	Mademoiselle	
1975	Medical Story	Mrs. Goodman	Television film
1976	Victory at Entebbe	French Nun	Television film
1977	The Other Side of Midnight	Mrs. Page	
1978	Ziegfeld: The Man and His Women	Louise	Television film
1978	Child of Glass	Madame Dumaine	Television film
1979	Portrait of a Stripper	Yvette	Television film
1980	Private Benjamin	Mrs. Trémont	
1982	The Junkman	French Reporter	
1984	Silent Night, Deadly Night	Mother Superior	
1985	Beyond Reason	Nurse Johnson	
1987	Born in East L.A.	German Woman	
1987	Right to Die	Raylen	Television film
1989	Listen to Me	French Professor	
1989	Death Doll	Madame Zerba	Voice
1990	Angel Town	French Teacher	
1990	Bad Influence	Art Gallery Patron	
1990	Predator 2	Dr. Irene Edwards	
1991	For the Very First Time	Sister Eugenia	
1991	True Identity	Police Station Woman	
1992	Stormy Weather	Mrs. Comden	Television film
1992	Universal Soldier	Mrs. John Devreux	
1992	Round Trip to Heaven	Chaperone	
1993	No Place to Hide	Mother Superior	
1994	Pumpkinhead II: Blood Wings	Miss Ossie	
1994	The Discoverers	French Astronomer	Short film
1994	Attack of the 5 Ft. 2 Women	Coach	Television film
1995	Tyson	Camille Ewald	Television film
1996	The Rockford Files: Punishment and Crime	Alyona Koblets	Television film
1998	The Warlord: Battle for the Galaxy	Mashwah	Television film
1999	Five Aces	Grandmother Kalliope	
2000	Missing Pieces	Old Woman	Television film
2000	Stanley's Gig	Grace	
2000	Skeleton Woman	Bone Gatherer	
2001	The Man Who Wasn't There	Medium	
2002	Duty Dating	Dr. Hartley	
2002	Catch Me If You Can	Mrs. Lavalier	
2004	Illusion Infinity	Nurse	
2004	Calling Hedy Lamarr	Herself	Documentary film
2006	Going to Pieces: The Rise and Fall of the Slasher Film	Herself	Documentary film
2007	The Kopper Kettle	Old Woman	Short film
2007	The Brass Teapot	Old Woman	Short film
2011	The Passing	Rebecca Naibert	Released posthumously, (final film role)

=== Television ===
Year	Title	Role	Notes
1950	Kraft Theatre	Villager	Episode: "Kelly"
1953	The Goldbergs	Mignon	Episode: "Simon's Maid and Butler"
1953	Studio One in Hollywood		Episode: "Letter from Cairo"
1956	Crusader	Hedda Danzig	Episode: "Rookie Cop"
1956	The Adventures of Jim Bowie	Liane Trudeau	Episode: "The Swordsman"
1957	The Man Called X		Episode: "Passport"
1957	Adventures of Superman	Anna Constantine	Episode: "Peril in Paris"
1957	The Court of Last Resort	Margarite Velez	Episode: "The George Zaccho Case"
1958	The Walter Winchell File	Minna	Episode: "Flight to Freedom: File #36"
1958	The Californians	Suzy	Episode: "The Man from Paris"
1958	Alfred Hitchcock Presents	Sybil Delamont	Season 3 Episode 22: "The Return of the Hero"
1958	Panic!		Episode: "Fingerprints"
1958	Harbor Command	Anna Meyerling	Episode: "Sanctuary"
1958	Maverick	Sydney Sue "Frenchy" Shipley	Episode: "High Card Hangs"
1958	Pursuit		Episode: "Ticket to Tangier"
1959	Dragnet		Episode: "The Big Thirteen"
1959	One Step Beyond	Francesca	Episode: "The Return of Mitchell Campion"
1959	Walt Disney's Wonderful World of Color	Fanny Durbach	Episode: "The Peter Tchaikovsky Story"
1960	Richard Diamond, Private Detective	Clara	Episode: "The Mouse"
1960	The Law and Mr. Jones	Francoise	Episode: "The Long Echo"
1961	Thriller	Mrs. Barrister	Episode: "Man in the Cage"
1961	Klondike		Episode: "Sitka Madonna"
1961	The Case of the Dangerous Robin	Woman	Episode: "Amsterdam Lapidary"
1962	King of Diamonds	Renee Dubois	Episode: "Backlash"
1962	Adventures in Paradise	Foridita	Episode: "The Baby Sitters"
1962	G.E. True	Mrs. Trouchout	Episode: "The Wrong Nickel"
1964	Combat!	Fauvette	Episode: "The Short Day of Private Putnam"
1964	The Rogues	Paris Announcer	Episode: "The Personal Touch"
1965	Bob Hope Presents the Chrysler Theatre	Sister	Episode: "The Fliers"
1965	The Man from U.N.C.L.E.	Madame Claudile	Episode: "The Hong Kong Shilling Affair"
1965	Perry Mason	Frau Zimmer	Episode: "The Case of the Fugitive Fraulein"
1966	Daniel Boone	Madame Simon	Episode: "When a King is the Pawn"
1967	Mission: Impossible	Mrs. Beruch	Episode: "Sweet Charity"
1969	The Outcasts	Silent Woman	Episode: "How Tall is Blood?"
1970	McCloud	Housekeeper	Episode: "Our Man in Paris"
1970	Matt Lincoln	Michele Barton	Episode: "Angie"
1970	To Rome with Love	Mademoiselle Roget	Episode: "Fly Away Home"
1971	McMillan & Wife	Madame Jarnac	Episode: "Once Upon a Dead Man"
1972	The F.B.I.		Episode: "The Hunters"
1973	Mannix	Johanna	Episode: "Out of the Night"
1973	The Magician	Anna	Episode: "The Vanishing Lady"
1973	The Bob Newhart Show	Olga	Episode: "The Fit, Fat, and Forty One"
1977	Black Sheep Squadron	Sister Dominique	Episode: "Poor Little Lambs"
1977	Man from Atlantis	French Scientist	Episode: "Pilot"
1977	Police Story	June Spenard	Episode: "Ice Time"
1978	Flying High	Miss Simmons	Episode: "Flying High"
1979	Visions	Greta	Episode: "Ladies in Waiting"
1979	Fantasy Island	Selena	Episode: "Nobody's There"/"The Dancer"
1981	Lou Grant	Magda	Episode: "The Search"
1982	Darkroom	Madame LeClerc	Episode: "Guillotine"
1982	Magnum, P.I.	Maria, The Sicilian Cook	2 episodes
1982	Hart to Hart	Maid	Episode: "The Hart of the Matter"
1982	Diff'rent Strokes	Zenashkaya Rokova	Episode: "On Your Toes"
1982	One Day at a Time	Nurse	Episode: "Last Time I Saw Paris"
1983	The Facts of Life	Marie	Episode: "Guess Who's Coming to Dinner?"
1983	Ryan's Four		Episode: "Pilot"
1984	Masquerade	Woman In Post Office	Episode: "The Defector"
1983–1984	Falcon Crest	Sister Jeanette	3 episodes
1987	Nutcracker: Money, Madness & Murder		Miniseries
1989–1991	Hollywood Structured	Herself / Host	64 episodes
1990	The Young and the Restless	Lil	4 episodes
1992	Baywatch	Dr. Lester	Episode: "Shark's Cove"
1993	Café Americain	Madame Dussolier	5 episodes
1994	Murder, She Wrote	Dispatcher	Episode: "Amsterdam Kill"
1995	Earth 2	Katrina	Episode: "The Greatest Love Story Never Told"
1996	The X-Files	Golda	Episode: "The Calusari"
1996	The Pretender	Mrs. Nikkos, The Greek Lady	Episode: "Pilot"
1997	Star Trek: Deep Space Nine	Vedek Yassim	Episode: "Rocks and Shoals"
1997	Saved by the Bell: The New Class	Old Woman	Episode: "Foreign Affairs"
1998	Maggie	Stancho's Wife	Episode: "Cats"
1998	USA High	Farm Lady	Episode: "Excess's Ex"
1999	Friends	Grandma Tribbiani	Episode: "The One Where Ross Can't Flirt"
2000	Shasta McNasty	Sister Mary	Episode: "Leo is a Pain in My Ass"
2000	Frasier	Mama	Episode: "The Three Faces of Frasier"
2001	The Beast	Anna	Episode: "The Damage Done"
2002	Alias	Signora Ventutti	Episode: "The Prophecy"
2003	ER	Nurse Edna	Episode: "Dear Abby"
2005	Malcolm in the Middle	Marica	Episode: "Ida's Dance"
2006	CSI: Crime Scene Investigation	Mrs. Aloyna Ivanovna	Episode: "Loco Motives"
2007	Ugly Betty	Isabella	Episode: "A Tree Grows in Guadalajara"

=== Video games ===
Year	Title	Role	Notes
1995	Phantasmagoria	Ethel	
2002	Soldier of Fortune II: Double Helix	Additional Voices	Voice
