= Protocol (film) =

1984 film by Herbert Ross

- Theatrical release poster
- Directed by: Herbert Ross
- Screenplay by: Buck Henry
- Story by: Charles Shyer; Nancy Meyers; Harvey Miller
- Produced by: Anthea Sylbert
- Starring: Goldie Hawn; Chris Sarandon; Richard Romanus
- Cinematography: William A. Fraker
- Edited by: Paul Hirsch
- Music by: Basil Poledouris
- Color process: Technicolor
- Distributed by: Warner Bros. Pictures
- Release date: December 21, 1984
- Running time: 96 minutes
- Country: United States
- Language: English
- Budget: $12 million
- Box office: $26.2 million (US/Canada)

Protocol is a 1984 American comedy film starring Goldie Hawn and Chris Sarandon, written by Buck Henry, and directed by Herbert Ross. Hawn plays a Washington, D.C. cocktail waitress who prevents the assassination of a visiting Arab emir and winds up a national heroine.

== Plot ==
Sunny Ann Davis is a seemingly ditzy blonde who works as a cocktail waitress in Washington, D.C. She rents a small room in the home of a gay couple, has a lousy love life and drives a rust bucket of a car that she cannot afford to repair.

The car breaks down, blocking the route of a diplomatic convoy that is traveling to the White House. Unsympathetic to Sunny's predicament, the Diplomatic Security Service treats the incident as a possible security threat and moves into full security mode, guns drawn. Sunny is naive to the seriousness of her situation, concerned only that she will now be late for work.

At the Safari Club where Sunny works, her night is getting worse. Her date cancels, and she is forced to wear an emu suit because all the other costumes are now taken by waitresses who arrived on time. She hates the costume because it invites unwanted sexual propositions. Even though she is "so broke," she refuses an offer from a patron requesting special "favors" in return for cash, as well as a loan from her waitress friend, Ella.

On her way home, Sunny is curious about the media attention surrounding a gala dinner, so she stops to watch the dignitaries as they leave the event. A man of Middle Eastern descent rudely pushes past her. Sunny feels something hard in his coat pocket. She asks if he has a gun. To her horror, he does. A shot is fired, but Sunny prevents him from aiming at his target by biting his arm. In the ensuing commotion, both Sunny and the gunman are forced to the ground, and another shot is fired. Sunny cries out, realizing she has been shot.

Through news media reports, we learn that Sunny has been taken to the hospital and is being lauded as a heroine. She has prevented the assassination of a visiting Emir, who had been in Washington to further relations between the US and his "small, but strategic Middle Eastern country", El Othar. Doctors remove a bullet from Sunny's left buttock. While recovering, she finds herself thrust into public adoration, receiving mail from celebrities and countless marriage proposals.

Michael Ransome, a Middle Eastern desk chief from the State Department, pays a visit to help Sunny navigate her first press conference since the shooting. Sunny answers each question about her life with humor and charm, revealing herself to be hugely likeable, intelligent and patriotic. She also reveals that she has never voted, preferring to consider herself simply an American, rather than adhering to any particular political label.

Back at the White House, politicians Crowe and Hilley are watching the conference. They joke that if Sunny is to be believed, she could run for office because of her appeal to so many large groups of voters, including working women, small town folk, senior citizens, gays, the "law-and-order bunch," baseball fans, bar flies and animal lovers. They contact the President of the United States (who is napping) and arrange for him to call Sunny at the hospital.

The Emir whose life Sunny saved was being wooed by the US, which wants to establish a military base in his country because of its ideal geographic location in the Middle East. He decides that he will allow the US to build its base in his country, on the provision that they will enable him to claim Sunny as another wife. Without the President's knowledge, the State Department decides to trade Sunny for the base without her knowledge.

The Vice President of the United States offers her a job within the Protocol Department of the Government. She has to look up what "protocol" means in a dictionary, but when she realizes he is offering her a well-paying job, she accepts.

Sunny approaches her new job with nervous excitement, she attends formal dinners and meets dignitaries from foreign countries. At one dinner, she is introduced to Nawaf Al Kabeer, who thanks Sunny on behalf of the Emir and presents her with a car as a thank-you gift from the Emir. She returns it, having researched that as a government employee, she is prohibited from accepting gifts. But this act infuriates both the Emir and the State Department.

Sunny is unaware that in the Emir's country, the local population is aware that Sunny is to be a new Queen, and anger is growing. Sunny is told that the Emir wants to meet her personally, and that she is to "show him a good time." She views this invitation as an opportunity to assist her former boss, Lou, by hosting a party at his struggling Safari Club, where she used to work. Lou has not closed the bar to his regular patrons, and Sunny has invited friends of her own. The party gets out of control, the Police make arrests, and the media film all of this.

Ambassador St. John sees this as a perfect opportunity to finally make the trade. She tells Sunny to go with the Emir to "represent her country" and make amends. Sunny arrives in the Emir's country to find a mural of herself in wedding attire. She realizes it's a set-up, that she was traded so the US could build its base.

The Emir confirms this. Unable to produce sons, he needs a new wife. Before an angry Sunny can respond, a violent coup d'état takes place in the Emir's country of Ohtar, and the two are forced to flee.

Back in the US, the government denies any knowledge of the trade, and the public is now questioning whether Sunny was aware of the plan all along. She must also face a Congressional inquiry to find out the truth. Ransome quits his job in disgust at what was done to Sunny.

At the inquiry, Sunny cuts the proceedings short by accepting blame, having taken on an important job without fully understanding the country's political affairs. But she reminds everyone that leaders have a responsibility toward the people. She warns the political powers in the room that, from now on, she will watch all of them "like a hawk."

Two years later, Sunny has married Ransome and they have a baby. She is also running for Congress in her hometown of Diamond Junction, Oregon, and receives a call telling her that she has won.

== Cast ==
- Goldie Hawn as Sunny Ann Davis
- Chris Sarandon as Michael Ransome
- Richard Romanus as Emir
- Andre Gregory as Nawaf Al Kabeer
- Gail Strickland as Ambassador St John
- Cliff DeYoung as John J. Hilley
- Keith Szarabajka as Crowe
- Ed Begley Jr. as Pat Hassler
- James Staley as Vice President Merck
- Kenneth Mars as Lou
- Jean Smart as Ella
- Maria O'Brien as Donna
- Joel Brooks as Ben
- Grainger Hines as Jerry
- Kenneth McMillan as Senator Morris
- Richard Hamilton as Mr. Davis
- Mary Carver as Mrs. Davis
- Kathleen York as Charmaine
- Tom Spratley as Grandpa
- Archie Hahn as T.V. Commentator
- George D. Wallace as T.V. Commentator
- Lyman Ward as Senator Kenworthy
- Daphne Maxwell Reid as Helene
- Roger Til as Belgium Ambassador
- Al Leong as Cook
- Amanda Bearse as Soap Opera Actress
- John Ratzenberger as Security Guard

== Reception ==
Roger Ebert gave the film 2.5 stars out of 4 and wrote, "The character that Goldie Hawn creates in this movie is so refreshing and so interesting that they should have made the extra effort to write an intelligent screenplay about her." Gene Siskel of the Chicago Tribune awarded 2 stars out of 4 and wrote that it played like a "bad sequel" to Hawn's earlier hit, Private Benjamin. Siskel suggested that "it might have been intended as some emotional Frank Capra film with Hawn in the Jimmy Stewart role. But Stewart never would have stood for all the grade-Z slapstick material here, including a truly pathetic, protracted barroom brawl scene in which an Arab stereotype (André Gregory in a humiliating role) is turned on by sado-masochism." Vincent Canby of The New York Times wrote, "Though everything in 'Protocol' has been most carefully contrived, it has been contrived by talented people, particularly by Mr. Henry." Variety stated, "Moving far away from the disaster of 'Swing Shift' and back toward the smash success of 'Private Benjamin,' Hawn is once again properly bubbly (and brainy), but one big problem here is an oh-so-obvious effort to reinvent the formula that boosted 'Benjamin' to new heights." Paul Attanasio of The Washington Post called it "the kind of corny screwball comedy you thought nobody made anymore. By the end, its ersatz political moralism is almost too much to take; but buoyed by Buck Henry's often hilarious script, a wiggy performance by Goldie Hawn as a not-so-dumb blond, and director Herbert Ross's sure comic touch, 'Protocol' is pleasant piffle for a Sunday afternoon." Michael Wilmington of the Los Angeles Times wrote that "Goldie Hawn is likable—even if this movie (which might actually be subtitled 'Private Benjamin' Goes to Washington') is not." Kim Newman of The Monthly Film Bulletin wrote that the movie's most obvious influence was the 1950 film Born Yesterday, "but without displaying any understanding of why it worked so well. Its most explicit borrowing is from what now seems to be Born Yesterday's most embarrassing scene—the dumb blond being converted to committed patriotism by reading the original Constitution and touring Washington's state monuments."

On the review aggregator website Rotten Tomatoes, 33% of 9 critics' reviews are positive, with an average rating of 4.6/10. On Metacritic, it has a score of 55% based on reviews from 7 critics, indicating "mixed or average reviews".

=== Box office ===
The film grossed $3,427,840 in its first 5 days, starting December 21, 1984, and playing at 893 theaters in the United States and Canada. It eventually grossed $26,186,631 in the two nations.
