= Flareup (film) =

1969 film by James Neilson

- Theatrical release poster
- Directed by: James Neilson
- Written by: Mark Rodgers
- Produced by: Leon Fromkess
- Starring: Raquel Welch; James Stacy; Luke Askew; Don Chastain; Ron Rifkin; Jean Byron
- Cinematography: Andrew J. McIntyre
- Edited by: Aaron Stell
- Music by: Les Baxter
- Production company: GMF
- Distributed by: Metro-Goldwyn-Mayer
- Release date: November 10, 1969
- Running time: 100 minutes
- Country: United States
- Language: English

Flareup is a 1969 American thriller film directed by James Neilson and written by Mark Rodgers. The film stars Raquel Welch, James Stacy, Luke Askew, Don Chastain, Ron Rifkin and Jean Byron. The film was released on November 10, 1969, by Metro-Goldwyn-Mayer.

== Plot ==
Michele is a Las Vegas go-go dancer whose interference in her best friend's faltering marriage is seen by the girl's ex-husband as the cause of the couple's recent divorce. Obsessed, he shoots his former wife in public but manages to get away; Michele fears he'll be coming after her next. She gets some help from the police, but fears for her safety when the maniac continually eludes capture. Driving from Vegas to Los Angeles, Michele finds work at a club called The Losers, where she's picked up by the friendly valet. She doesn't tell him there's a lunatic after her, but he knows something's wrong. Meanwhile, the killer has just shot an elderly man and stolen his car, and is on his way to L.A. to find Michele.

== Cast ==
- Raquel Welch as Michele
- James Stacy as Joe Brodnek
- Luke Askew as Alan Moris
- Don Chastain as Lieutenant Manion
- Ron Rifkin as sailor
- Jean Byron as Jerri Benton
- Pat Delaney as Iris
- Sandra Giles as Nikki
- Kay Peters as Lee
- Joe Billings as Lloyd Seibert
- Carol-Jean Thompson as Jackie
- Mary Wilcox as Tora
- Carl Byrd as Sergeant Newcomb
- Steve Conte as Lieutenant Franklin
- Tom Fadden as Mr. Willows
- Michael Rougas as Dr. Connors
- David Moses as technician
- Will J. White as Sergeant Stafford
- Douglas Rowe as gas station attendant
- Gordon Jump as security guard
- Ike Williams as policeman

== Production ==
The film was based on an original screenplay. It was the first film by the GMF Pictures Corporation, a Getty company that was run by J. Paul Getty's son Ronald.

Filming began in March 1969 and finished in June.

In the film, Welch dances to the hit song "Suzie Q" by Creedence Clearwater Revival.

In the press-kit for the film,. Welch is interviewed saying she fit the filming schedule for Flareup into the seven week-break she suddenly had on Myra Breckinridge after producers halted production on that film for a complete rewrite. The press-kit also says Welch was thrown by a horse during filming of the beach sequence but was unharmed.

== Reception ==
The Monthly Film Bulletin wrote: "Though fairly slight in impact and achievement, Flareup is an interesting example of how the mainstream American cinema is now being influenced by visiting English directors. Here James Neilson (who has up to now mainly made Disney films) and his scriptwriter borrow quite unashamedly from Bullitt and Point Blank in order to turn what might otherwise have been a reasonably light-hearted thriller into yet another essay on violence in contemporary America. Actually, in this instance, the serious tone makes the film that much more worthwhile, and the quite unmotivated and irrational violence of the killer is genuinely disturbing. But it is all too easy for this kind of thing to develop into a sort of sensational sado-masochism, and it does here when, for a climax, Raquel Welch throws petrol over her would-be assassin and sets him on fire. The juxtaposition of this sequence with a semi-conventional romantic ending is clear enough indication of the film's limitations, and also of the difficulties involved in incorporating new ideas into an old."

Variety wrote: "Direction by Jameas [sic] Neilson link [sic] a number of action moments with expert suspense-building and climax is a shocker, when Miss Welch, one of the hunted girls, throws gasoline on her nemesis and sets him afire. Development of the hunt by Luke Askew, as the cracked killer, is skillfully woven and enables star to add dramatic ability to her past image as a sexpot."

== See also ==
- List of American films of 1969
