= Irvin Faust =

American novelist (1924–2012)

Irvin Faust (June 11, 1924 – July 24, 2012) was an American author and educator.

== Early life and career ==
Faust was born to a Jewish family in Brooklyn, New York, the son of Morris and Pauline (née Henschel) Faust.

He served in the Army infantry during World War II in both the Pacific and European theaters and helped liberate Nazi concentration camps.

Attending school on the G.I. Bill, Faust earned a degree at City College and taught in New York City public schools. In the early 1950s Faust studied acting at the Neighborhood Playhouse. He later earned two master's degrees and a Ph.D. from Teacher's College of Columbia University. For many years he was the Director of Guidance at Garden City High School (New York), Garden City, NY.

Faust's doctoral thesis was published in 1963 under the title Entering Angel’s World: A Student-Centered Casebook. That success prompted him to take a creative writing course, and he soon sold his first short story, “Into the Green Night".

== Writing ==
Between 1956 and 2008 Faust wrote seven novels, two books of short stories and a number of uncollected short stories for various publications. He described his writing as dealing "with the displacement and disorganization of Americans in urban life; with their attempt to find adjustments in the glossy attractions of the mass media-movies, radio, TV, advertising, etc.–and in the image-radiating seductions of our institutions.. Very often this “adjustment” is to the “normal” perception a derangement, but perfectly satisfying to my subjects."

His first major publication, Roar Lion Roar and Other Stories (1965), reviewed excellent reviews. Stanley Kauffmann described the opening the book “like clicking on a switch: at once we hear the electric hum of talent.” In The New York Times Book Review, Webster Schott said most of the stories “rise from Manhattan, isle of illusions, and all deal with the consequences of placing faith in fantasies.”

Willy Remembers (1971) tells the story of an elderly Spanish-American War veteran suffering from memory issues. In an introduction to the paperback edition of the book in 1983, Elmore Leonard wrote, “There is more sustained energy in the telling of what he remembered than in any novel I’ve ever read.”

The Steagle (1966) told of a professor who slips into a fantasy world during the Cuban missile crisis and travels the country seeking amorous adventures. It was made into a film of the same name in 1971. The film adaptation was directed by Paul Sylbert and starred Richard Benjamin, Chill Wills and Cloris Leachman.

His ill health reduced his writing in his later years, but he published a short story in 2008.

== Personal life ==
Faust met Jean Satterthwaite at a Christmas party in New York City. They married on August 29, 1959 and remained married until Faust's death in 2012.

== Death ==
Faust died from pneumonia following a series of strokes.

== Selected bibliography ==
=== Novels ===
- The Steagle (Random House, 1966)
- The File on Stanley Patton Buchta (Random House, 1970)
- Willy Remembers (Arbor House, 1971)
- Foreign Devils (Arbor House, 1973)
- A Star in the Family (Doubleday, 1975)
- Newsreel (Harcourt Brace Jovanovich, 1980)
- Jim Dandy (Carroll & Graf, 1994)

=== Short fiction ===
- Roar Lion, Roar and Other Stories (Random House, 1965)
- The Year of the Hot Jock and Other Stories (Dutton, 1985)

=== Other ===
- Entering Angel's World: A Student-Centered Casebook (Columbia University, 1963)

=== Stories ===
Title	Publication	Collected in
"Into the Green Night"	The Carleton Miscellany (Winter 1961)	Roar Lion, Roar
"Jake Bluffstein and Adolph Hitler"	The Carleton Miscellany (Spring 1962)	Roar Lion, Roar
"The World's Fastest Human"	The Transatlantic Review 14 (Autumn 1963)	Roar Lion, Roar
"Roar Lion Roar"	San Francisco Review Annual 1 (1963)	Roar Lion, Roar
"Philco Baby"	The Paris Review 31 (Winter-Spring 1964)	Roar Lion, Roar
"Googs in Lambarene"	The Carleton Miscellany 5.2 (Spring 1964)	Roar Lion, Roar
"The Dalai Lama of Harlem"	The Sewanee Review 72.2 (Spring 1964)	The Year of the Hot Jock
"Wobbilobby Mobbays"	The Transatlantic Review 17 (Autumn 1964)	from The Steagle
"The Madras Rumble"	The Saturday Evening Post (November 14, 1964)	Roar Lion, Roar
"Miss Dorothy Thompson's American Eaglet"	Roar Lion, Roar and Other Stories (1964)	Roar Lion, Roar
"Justice for Ladejinsky"	Roar Lion, Roar and Other Stories (1964)	Roar Lion, Roar
"The Duke Imlach Story"	Roar Lion, Roar and Other Stories (1964)	Roar Lion, Roar
"Operation Buena Vista"	The Paris Review 35 (Fall 1965)	The Year of the Hot Jock
"The Double Snapper"	Esquire (December 1965)	The Year of the Hot Jock
"Simon Girty Go Ape"	The Transatlantic Review 21 (Summer 1966)	The Year of the Hot Jock
"Gary Dis-Donc"	The Northwest Review (Summer 1967)	The Year of the Hot Jock
"Welcome to the Fort"	New York (March 30, 1970)	from The File on Stanley Patton Buchta
"Melanine and the Purple People Eaters"	The Atlantic (December 1981)	The Year of the Hot Jock
"The Year of the Hot Jock"	Confrontation (Spring 1985)	The Year of the Hot Jock
"Bunny Berigan in the Elephants' Graveyard"	Action/Image (Spring 1985)	The Year of the Hot Jock
"Bar Bar Bar"	The Year of the Hot Jock and Other Stories (1985)	The Year of the Hot Jock
"Action at Vicksburg"	New Black Mask Quarterly 5 (Summer 1986)	
"The Empire State Is Number Three?"	Confrontation (Spring-Summer 1990)	
"Artie and Benny"	Michigan Quarterly Review 28.2 (Spring 1989)	
"The Blue Seats"	Confrontation (Spring-Summer 1990)	
"Bootsie Wants Harvard"	Four Quarters (Fall 1991)	
"Let Me Off Uptown"	Fiction 10.1/2 (1991)	
"Enemy Propaganda"	Confrontation (Spring-Summer 1992)	
"The Combat Zone"	Descant 33.1 (1993)	
"Black Auxiliaries"	The Literary Review (Summer 1994)	
"Paradise"	Confrontation (Spring-Summer 1996)	
"Starring Nohj Anyew"	The Literary Review 44.3 (Spring 2001)	
"B-17"	The Literary Review 46.3 (Spring 2003)	
"Anna May Wong Was Chinese?"	Confrontation 88/89 (Fall 2004-Winter 2005)	
"Scott Fitzgerald Has Left the Garden of Allah"	The Literary Review 51.2 (Winter 2008)	
