= Going to Pieces: The Rise and Fall of the Slasher Film =

- Directed by: Jeff McQueen
- Written by: J. Albert Bell; Rachel Belofsky; Michael Derek Bohusz
- Produced by: Rachel Belofsky; Rudy Scalese
- Starring: Lilyan Chauvin; Wes Craven; Sean S. Cunningham; Harry Manfredini
- Narrated by: Ed Green
- Music by: Harry Manfredini
- Production companies: Starz Entertainment; THINKFilm
- Release dates: 13 October 2006 (USA); 14 August 2010 (Australia)
- Running time: 88 minutes
- Country: USA
- Language: English

Going to Pieces: The Rise and Fall of the Slasher Film is a 2006 documentary film about slasher films. It makes reference to many popular horror and thriller films as well.

== Synopsis ==
The film is a historical and critical look at slasher films, which includes dozens of clips, beginning with Halloween, Friday the 13th, and Prom Night. The films' directors, writers, producers, and special effects creators comment on the films' making and success. During the Ronald Reagan years, the films get gorier, budgets get smaller, and their appeal diminishes. Then, A Nightmare on Elm Street revives the genre. Jumping to the late 1990s, when Scream brings humor and TV stars into the mix. Although some criticize the genre as misogynistic, most of the talking heads celebrate the films: as long as there are teenagers, there will be slasher films.

== Movie references ==
- Alone in the Dark (1982)
- April Fool's Day (1986)
- Black Christmas (1974)
- Bay of Blood/Twitch of the Death Nerve (1971)
- The Boogeyman (1980)
- Christmas Evil (1980)
- Don't Answer the Phone (1980)
- Don't Open Till Christmas (1984)
- Freddy Vs. Jason (2003)
- Friday the 13th (1980)
- Friday the 13th Part II (1981)
- Friday the 13th Part III (1982)
- Friday the 13th: The Final Chapter (1984)
- Graduation Day (1981)
- Halloween (1978)
- Halloween II (1981)
- Happy Birthday to Me (1981)
- He Knows You're Alone (1980)
- Hostel (2005)
- House of 1000 Corpses (2003)
- I Know What You Did Last Summer (1997)
- Intruder (1989)
- Just Before Dawn (1981)
- The Last House on the Left (1972)
- Maniac (1980)
- Mother's Day (1980)
- My Bloody Valentine (1981)
- New Year's Evil (1980)
- A Nightmare on Elm Street (1984)
- Peeping Tom (1960)
- Pieces (1982)
- Prom Night (1980)
- The Prowler (1981)
- Psycho (1960)
- Saturday the 14th (1981)
- Saw (2004)
- Scream (1996)
- Silent Night, Deadly Night (1984)
- Sleepaway Camp (1983)
- Suspiria (1977)
- Terror Train (1980)
- The Burning (1981)
- The Devil's Rejects (2005)
- The Hills Have Eyes (1977)
- The House on Sorority Row (1983)
- The Slumber Party Massacre (1982)
- The Texas Chain Saw Massacre (1974)
- Urban Legend (1998)
- When A Stranger Calls (2006)
- Wolf Creek (2005)

== Interviews ==
- Christa Campbell
- John Carpenter
- Lilyan Chauvin
- Wes Craven
- Sean S. Cunningham
- John Dunning
- Amy Holden Jones
- Jeff Katz
- Paul Lynch
- Harry Manfredini
- Armand Mastroianni
- Gregory Nicotero
- Robert Oppenheimer
- Betsy Palmer
- Felissa Rose
- Tom Savini
- Robert Shaye
- Joseph Stefano
- Natasha Talonz
- Anthony Timpone
- Fred Walton
- Stan Winston
- Joseph Zito
- Rob Zombie

== Production ==
The documentary film based on Adam Rockoff's book Going to Pieces: The Rise and Fall of the Slasher Film, 1978-1986, which was released 2002 over the McFarland & Company.

== See also ==
- Slice and Dice: The Slasher Film Forever
