= The German Element in the United States =

Book by Albert Bernhardt Faust

The German Element in the United States, With Special Reference to Its Political, Moral, Social and Educational Influence, by Albert Bernhardt Faust is a two-volume work published in 1909. It discusses the experience, influence and accomplishments of people of German heritage residing in the United States from the times of the early European settlements through the 19th century.

== Origins of the book ==
Although Faust, a professor of German at Cornell University, felt the time was hardly ripe for such a work, he also felt there were dangers of being overcautious; merely hoarding the materials he had been collecting without making intelligent use of them destroyed an opportunity and left a responsibility undischarged as he saw it. So when Catherine Seipp of Chicago offered prizes for monographs on the subject, Faust responded and received the first prize.

== Basic statistics ==
Attention is given to population statistics in the book. Faust clearly proceeded with the intention of understating the total proportion of persons of German heritage in the United States at the time of the 1900 census, and his estimate falls short of some previous reckonings, giving 18,000,000 as against 20,000,000 of English descent, 13,000,000 of Irish descent and 14,000,000 of other stocks. The fact that these statistics were prepared under the supervision of Walter F. Willcox of Cornell gives them some credibility.

== Influence of the German element ==
The work is not limited to such statistics. Faust's chief object, as the book's subtitle emphasizes, was to estimate the influence of people of German heritage upon the whole body politic of the United States. This goal prompted a twofold solution: first, a chronological history of people of German heritage in the United States; and second, a categorical discussion, looking at the influence in political, moral, social and educational fields. The first volume contains the chronological history, and the second volume studies contributions of people of German heritage by field of endeavor. Both volumes are supplemented by population statistics.

The history as outlined includes individuals and communities. Examples of individuals include Conrad Weiser, Christian Frederick Post, Nicholas Herkimer, Christoph Ludwig, John Adam Treutlen, Leonard Helm, Joseph Bowman, Friedrich Münch, Charles Follen, Adolph Sutro, John Sutter, John Röbling, Peter Mühlenberg, Baron von Steuben, Baron de Kalb, Franz Lieber and Carl Schurz. In addition, Faust collected a good deal of material on early German settlements in Pennsylvania, Virginia, and elsewhere.

== Presentation strategy ==
In the first volume, the chronological history, Faust largely builds up a negative argument in favor of the early German settlers in the United States, "their value being manifest mainly when measured by the standard of assimilation". In the second volume, the categorical history, he sets out to show what he feels is a positive influence of people of German heritage upon life in the United States and upon the American stereotype.

In the large, Faust's method in the second volume was to sum up instances in order to establish principles. For example, in the chapter on industrial development, illustrations are furnished purporting to prove that in all branches requiring technical training German influence was predominant. Under the head of politics, the independent voting behavior of people of German heritage receives illustration. In the area of agriculture, the principle is maintained that the German farmer not only applied his skill and industry, but whenever necessary adapted himself to new conditions, using and inventing agricultural machinery, or becoming a rice grower in the South and big farmer in the West.

== Inconsistencies ==
Faust admits to inconsistencies in places. For example, in treating the early history of New York, that is New Netherland, he clearly distinguished Peter Minuit, the German purchaser and first Governor of Manhattan, and a later tenant of that office, Jacob Leisler, from the Dutch settlers, and says little about the Dutch governors. Yet when he came to reckoning the number of persons of German descent in the United States in the early 20th century, he included the Dutch in a lump as Low Germans.

Citing what he saw as their racial seclusion, he did not take German Jews into account as a body, but still he singled out for mention not a few Jews of German heritage in the United States who seemed to him to represent what he saw as the German spirit. He thought omitting a mention of such people in his book would be like omitting a mention of Heinrich Heine in a recording of German literature. And it seems likely more are included since large numbers of United States residents appear in the book merely because they bear names of German origin.

== Excerpts ==
=== German emigration in the 18th century ===
It was not until the 18th century that the westward tide of German emigration really began. Its rapid increase during the first decades of those years was largely due to the fact that the conditions of life in the United States were becoming more favorable, but still more largely to the military and religious oppressions increasingly inflicted upon the subjects of the German states.

Most of the immigrants during the 18th century came from southern Germany. Such a large proportion of them came from the Palatinate that "Palatine" became the general title of German immigrants in England and the United States. In the Palatinate, indeed, conditions were especially intolerable. For many years the country was ravaged by wars and persecutions. But Germany as a whole was in a bad way. It was "broken up into hundreds of practically independent principalities, whose rulers generally imitated the example of Louis XIV.” In short, the conditions which brought about the French Revolution were as prevalent in Germany as in France. There was every incentive to escape from Germany.

It was not long before strong inducements to emigration were offered in the New World. Flattering accounts of the conditions of life in the colonies were published throughout Germany. Immigration agents did a good business for themselves. The system of "redemptioners" — immigrants who virtually sold themselves into slavery for a term of years to pay their passage to the colonies – was brutal in the extreme. These victims were packed on shipboard precisely as African slaves were then and later.

A very large proportion of the immigrants died on the passage. A German pastor writes in 1773 of a shipload of 1,500 German emigrants only 400 of whom lived to see the new land. The sale of "redemptioners" continued to be legal until 1820. It certainly resulted in the importation of a very much larger number of Germans than would otherwise have settled in the colonies during that period.

The Palatinate had become a region so little habitable that a sort of mania for exile seized upon thousands of its inhabitants. In 1709 some 13,000 of them swarmed into London. They were treated very kindly by the Londoners, but something had to be done with them, and a large part of them were sent out into the colonies. According to tradition, a Native American chief who was visiting in London saw and pitied the exiles and offered Queen Anne a tract of land for some of them on the Schoharie Creek, in New York State. Some 3,000 of the Palatines sailed for New York, a fourth of whom died of ship fever. They were not accepted as equals by the colonists in New York, and their way was difficult, but eventually many of them found their way to the Schoharie.

=== Did you know? ===
A German visited the North Atlantic coast with Leif Ericson. A German invented the name America. A German bought the island of Manhattan, and was the first Governor of New Netherland. A German (Jacob Leisler, later Governor of New York) was the first to call a Congress of the colonies and the first to represent the people against the aristocrats. A Palatine printer, John Peter Zenger, fought the first battle in America for the liberty of the press.

=== American Revolution ===
At the outbreak of the American Revolution, about a third of the population of Pennsylvania were of German heritage. Their part in the war was not small. George Washington's body guard was made up almost wholly of people of German heritage, and he had a high regard for these troops who served throughout the war.

Faust also asserts "Time ought to be allowed to heal the wound that Hessian bayonets once inflicted. The Hessians were the victims of the tyranny of their rulers, who sold the lives and services of their subjects to the highest bidder". The prince of Hesse-Cassel made £2,959,800 in this way in eight years. England probably spent three times that sum altogether on German mercenaries.
