= Anthea Sylbert =

American costume designer (1939–2024)

- Publicity photo of Anthea Sylbert
- Born: Anthea Giannakouros; October 6, 1939; New York City, United States
- Died: June 18, 2024 (aged 84); Skiathos, Greece
- Occupation: Costume designer
- Years active: 1967–1999
- Spouses: Paul Sylbert (m. 1965; div. 1984) Richard Romanus (m. 1985; died 2023)

Anthea Sylbert (née Giannakouros; October 6, 1939 – June 18, 2024) was an American film producer and costume designer, who was active during the "modern era" of American film. She was nominated twice for Academy Awards for Best Costume Design, first at the 47th Academy Awards for Chinatown (1974), and then at the 50th Academy Awards for her work on Julia (1977). In addition, she had more than ten credits as producer or executive producer, including for such works as CrissCross (1991) and the television film Truman (1995), the latter of which earned Sylbert an Emmy. At the 7th Annual Costume Designers Guild Awards in 2005, Sylbert was an honoree, receiving the Lacoste Career Achievement award for film.

== Early life and education ==
Anthea Giannakouros was born in Brooklyn, New York, on October 6, 1939, to parents Nick and Georgia Giannakouros and lived in what has been described as a "close-knit Greek family". She had one brother, Thomas. Keenly interested in artistic activities as a child, she is reported to have learned to sew from a grandmother. She studied art at Barnard College. Later in life, she moved to the Greek island of Skiathos with her husband, actor Richard Romanus, where they resided until their passing. Sylbert was recognized with the Costume Designers Guild’s Lacoste Career Achievement Award in 2005.

== Career ==
Following her long period of costume design work, Sylbert took on executive production management roles at the vice president level, first at Warner Brothers, then at United Artists, where she was known, in particular, for her skills at conflict resolution when filmmakers were at odds with the studios. After this period, she began a deep partnership with Goldie Hawn, beginning with the film Private Benjamin (1980). Ultimately, the two of them created the Hawn/Sylvebert Movie Company, which produced a number of films, including Protocol (1984) and Something to Talk About (1995).

=== Work on Chinatown ===
Sylbert worked with Chinatown (1974) from its early days after her brother-in-law Richard Sylbert introduced and recommended her to director Roman Polanski. Sylbert was affectionately known in that close-working, small group of accomplished filmmakers as Ant for her penchant for "stringently straight" dark skirts and black turtlenecks. Sylbert was known to be "utterly unafraid to speak truth, no matter how ugly, to anyone, no matter how powerful". Her work was described as breaking with the past in its aim at being "not for beauty or for chic” but rather "to amplify character". Sylbert was nominated for the 1975 Academy Award for Best Costume Design for her work on the film.

=== Work on Julia ===
Sylbert was nominated for the 1978 Academy Award for Best Costume Design for her work on the film Julia (1977).

== Personal life ==
In 1965, Sylbert married Paul Sylbert, a production designer, art director and set designer. The couple divorced in 1984.

In August 1985, Sylbert married the actor and writer Richard Romanus. In 2000, Sylbert and Romanus moved to the Greek island of Skiathos, and were made honorary citizens in 2021. Sylbert died in Skiathos on June 18, 2024, at the age of 84.

== Filmography ==
The following is Anthea Sylbert's list of credits, primarily as reported by the British Film Institute.

=== Producing ===
- 1999, If You Believe
- 1998, Giving up the Ghost (teleplay)
- 1997, Hope
- 1995, Truman
- 1995, Something to Talk About
- 1991, Deceived
- 1991, Crisscross
- 1990, My Blue Heaven
- 1987, Overboard
- 1986, Wildcats
- 1984, Protocol

=== Costumes and costume design ===
- 1978, F.I.S.T.
- 1977, Julia
- 1976, The Last Tycoon
- 1976, King Kong
- 1975, Shampoo
- 1974, Chinatown
- 1974, The Fortune
- 1972, Bad Company
- 1971, The Cowboys
- 1971, Carnal Knowledge
- 1969, The Illustrated Man
- 1968, Rosemary's Baby

=== Other credits ===
- 2008, Roman Polanski: Wanted and Desired, on-screen participant
- 1999, If You Believe, writer, with Richard Romanus
- 1976, Mikey and Nicky, visual consultant

== Awards and recognition ==
In addition to the 1975 and 1978 Academy Award nominations for best costume design, Sylbert won an Emmy for her production of Truman (1995). In 1999, Sylbert and Richard Romanus were nominated for Best Original Screenplay by the Writers Guild of America for the Christmas film If You Believe. Sylbert was an honoree at the 7th Annual Costume Designers Guild Awards (in 2005), where she received the Lacoste Career Achievement award for film.

== Additional reading ==
- Rubin, Natasha (2018). "Sylbert, Anthea (1939-)". In Bauer, Laura L. S. (ed.). Hollywood Heroines: The Most Influential Women in Film History. Santa Barbara, CA: ABC-CLIO. pp. 88–90. ISBN 9781440836497.
- Jorgensen, Jay & Scoggins, Donald L. (2015). Creating the Illusion: A Fashionable History of Hollywood Costume Designers. Philadelphia, PA: Running Press. pp. 318–321. ISBN 9780762458073.
- Wasson, Sam (2020). The Big Goodbye: Chinatown and the Last Years of Hollywood. New York, NY: Flatiron Books. ISBN 9781250301833.
- Gregory, Mollie (2003). Women Who Run the Show: How a Brilliant and Creative New Generation of Women Stormed Hollywood. New York, NY: Macmillan. pp. 69, 159–166, 400. ISBN 9780312316341.
