= Richard Romanus =

American actor (1943–2023)

- Publicity photo of Richard Romanus
- Born: Richard Joseph Romanos; February 8, 1943; Barre, Vermont, U.S.
- Died: December 23, 2023 (aged 80); Volos, Greece
- Occupations: Actor, writer, screenwriter, songwriter
- Spouses: Tina Bohlmann (m. 1967; div. 1980); Anthea Sylbert (m. 1985)
- Children: 1
- Relatives: Robert Romanus (brother)
- Awards: Best Original Screenplay in Longform Television by the Writers Guild of America (nominated)

Richard Romanus (born Richard Joseph Romanos; February 8, 1943 – December 23, 2023) was an American actor. He appeared in Martin Scorsese's Mean Streets and provided voices for Ralph Bakshi's animated films Wizards and Hey Good Lookin'. He played Richard La Penna, Jennifer Melfi's ex-husband, later husband again, in four episodes of The Sopranos from 1999 to 2002. In 1999, he co-wrote the Christmas film If You Believe along with his wife Anthea Sylbert, which was nominated by the Writers Guild of America TV Award for Original Long Form.

== Personal life ==
Romanus was born in Barre, Vermont, the son of Eileen (née Maloof) and Dr. Raymond Romanos, a dentist. He was of Lebanese descent. Romanus grew up Catholic. He lived in West Hartford, Connecticut, and in 1964 graduated from Xavier University with a bachelor's in philosophy, before studying acting with Lee Strasberg at the Actors Studio in New York. His younger brother Robert Romanus is also an actor. They both appeared in the MacGyver episode "The Prodigal" in 1985. On May 20, 1967, he married Tina Bohlmann; they had a son before divorcing in 1980.

Romanus was married to Oscar-nominated costume designer Anthea Sylbert from August 1985 until his death. In 2004, they moved to the Greek island of Skiathos, after which he focused on writing. In 2011, he published his memoirs, Act III (Aiora Press, Athens, and Armida Publications, Nicosia), and first novel, Chrysalis (Armida Publications). In 2012, Act III was short-listed for the International Rubery Book Award.

Romanus died in Volos, Greece, on December 23, 2023, at the age of 80.

== Filmography ==
This is a list of films that have featured Richard Romanus.

=== Films ===
Year	Title	Role	Notes
1968	The Ghastly Ones	Don	
1973	Mean Streets	Michael	
1974	The Gravy Train	Carlo	
1975	Russian Roulette	Ragulia	
1976	Tracks	Porter	
1977	Wizards	Weehawk	
1980	Sitting Ducks	Joe 'Moose Joe' Mastaki	
1981	Heavy Metal	Harry Canyon	
1982	Pandemonium	Jarrett	
1982	Hey Good Lookin'	Vinnie	
1983	Strangers Kiss	Frank Silva	
1984	Protocol	The Emir	
1986	Murphy's Law	Frank Vincenzo	
1988	The Couch Trip	Harvey Michaels	
1991	Oscar	Vendetti	
1993	Point of No Return	Fahd Bahktiar	
1994	Cops & Robbersons	Fred Lutz	
2001	Nailed	Uncle Robert	
2003	The Young Black Stallion	Ben Ishak	

=== Television (partial) ===
Year	Title	Role	Notes
1970	Mission: Impossible	Guard	Episode: "Giatano"
1970–1971	The Mod Squad	Paco Montoya/Aurelio	2 episodes
1974	Rhoda	Luis Alvarez	Episode: "9-E is Available"
1974	Kojak	Detective Sam Calucci	Episode: "The Betrayal"
1977	Night Terror	The Killer	TV movie
1977	Charlie's Angels	Roy David	Episode: "The Big Tap-Out"
1977	Starsky & Hutch	'Sonny' Watson	Episode: "Huggy Bear and the Turkey"
1978	Rockford Files	Sean Innes	Episode: "Three Day Affair with a Thirty Day Escrow"
1978	Hawaii Five-O	Johnny Noah	Episode: "Small Potatoes"
1979	Gold of the Amazon Women	Luis Escobar	TV movie
1980	Tenspeed and Brown Shoe	Tommy Tedesco	Pilot episode
1980	Hart to Hart	Marty Benton	Episode: "This Lady is Murder"
1981-1982	Strike Force	Lieutenant Charlie Gunzer	
1981	Fantasy Island	Robert Luria	Segment: "The Perfect Husband"
1981	Foul Play	Captain Jakoby/Captain Vito Lombardi	
1982	Matt Houston	Prince Fahad Ibn Hasim	Episode: "The Kidnapping"
1983	Hardcastle and McCormick	Freddie Kane	Episode: "The Boxer"
1983-1987	Cagney & Lacey	Hassan bin Moqtadi/Det. Sal Caprio	2 episodes
1983-1986	The A-Team	Tommy Tedesco/Jackie Martell	2 episodes
1984	Hunter	Nathan "Nate" Demarest	Episode: "High Bleacher Man"
1984	Second Sight: A Love Story	Dr. Ross Harkin	TV movie
1985	Tales from the Darkside	Frank Bigalow	Episode: "Bigalow's Last Smoke"
1985	Fame	Joe Garver	Episode: "Tomorrow's Children"
1985-1986	MacGyver	James Crowe/Joey Bennett	2 episodes
1986	Hill Street Blues	Captain Bob Ajanian	2 episodes
1989	Midnight Caller	Maurice Maxwell	Episode: "Trash Radio"
1989	Mission Impossible	Arthur Six	Episode: "The Fixer"
1991	Jake and the Fatman	Harry Rendel	Episode: "Street of Dreams"
1992	Reasonable Doubts	Donovan Black	Episode: "Silence"
1993	Johnny Bago	Vinnie	4 episodes
1994	Chicago Hope	Anthony Travelli	Episode: "With the Greatest of Ease"
1995	Northern Exposure	Lowell Grippo	Episode: "Little Italy"
1995	Charlie Grace	Rudy Novak	Episode: "One Simple Little Favour"
1996	Diagnosis: Murder	Dr. Ed Quiller	Episode: "Misdiagnosis Murder"
1996	NYPD Blue	Carmine Del Marco	Episode: "A Tushful of Dollars"
1999	If You Believe	Walter	TV movie
1999-2002	The Sopranos	Richard La Penna	4 episodes

== Bibliography ==
- Act III, 2011 (Aiora Press, Athens, and Armida Publications, Nicosia)
- Chrysalis, 2011 (Armida Publications, Nicosia)

== Awards and nominations ==
- 1999 – Best Original Screenplay in Long Form Television - Writers Guild of America (nominated)
- 2012 – Short-listed for the International Rubery Book Award for Act III
