= Sharmagne Leland-St. John =

American poet (born 1946)

- Born: May 23, 1946 (age 80); United States
- Spouse: Richard Sylbert
- Children: Daisy Alexandra Sylbert-Torres
- Parents: Jerry St. John (father); Rose Anne "Baby Rose" Gahan (mother)
- Relatives: Oscar Gahan (grandfather)

Sharmagne Leland-St. John (born May 23, 1946) is a Native American poet, actress, and production designer. She was a 2007 Pushcart Prize for Poetry nominee. Her children include Daisy Alexandra Sylbert Torres.

== Early life ==
Sharmagne Leland-St. John was born on May 23, 1946. Her maternal grandfather was a Canadian violinist. Her father, Jerome St, John, was an animal trapper in the jungles of Tegucigalpa, Honduras. When Leland-St. John was three years old, her father left the family, and placed Leland-St. John and her older sister in a Catholic convent. During her childhood, she collected exotic animals to supply zoos and private estates. She also had a pheasant farm and quail ranch in Mexico City. She eventually settled in Tarzana, California.

== Career ==
In the mid-1960s, Leland-St. John met and began dating Peter Yarrow from the folk singing group Peter, Paul and Mary. Through the group's road manager, she was introduced to guitarist Peter Walker, with whom she began performing in concert and writing song lyrics. Under the name Peter and the Countess, they performed in venues such as The Fillmore East and West, The Psychedelic Super Market in Boston, The Ark in San Francisco, and The Ash Grove in Los Angeles. In addition to Peter and the Countess, Leland-St. John and Walker formed the band Orient Express, which included Bruce Langhorne and Lowell George. They also performed the music behind Timothy Leary's slide shows, "Celebrations".

In the late 1960s, while working for songwriter Jimmy Webb, Leland-St. John began writing poetry and song lyrics. She collaborated with Yarrow and Walker, as well as several other well-known composers, including Darby Slick, Jefferson Airplane, Hedge Capers, Hedge and Donna and Wes Farrell. At age 19, she co-wrote two episodes of the TV series "The Beverly Hillbillies." Leland-St. John was close friends with actress Sharon Tate and director Roman Polanski. She claims to have lived with Jay Sebring on Easton Dr.

In the 1970s, Leland-St. John acted in TV commercials and appeared in features and on TV. She later returned to writing and published seven books of poetry and prose. With Sylvia Townsend, she co-wrote the memoir her husband, Richard Sylbert, had begun but left unfinished at the time of his death, titled Designing Movies: Portrait of a Hollywood Artist (2006). She has also overseen the publication of the online journal Quill and Parchment for the past 22 years.

In 2001, Leland-St. John designed her first film, Tricks. She co-directed and co-produced the short film Being with Eddie in 2003. Her short film screenplay, Butterfly Catcher, was filmed by the Native American Film and TV Alliance (NAFATA) in 2004.

== Personal life ==
Leland-St. John is the widow of Richard Sylbert. They had two children: a boy, Nikolai, who lived for only a few hours, whom she wrote a poem about, titled "Tiny Warrior", and a daughter, Daisy Alexandra. She now splits time between Pasadena, California, her private fly-fishing lodge in Washington, an adobe in Taos, New Mexico, and a villetta in Florence, Italy.

== Bibliography ==
- Unsung Songs (2003) ISBN 978-0-9764244-0-6 Quill and Parchment Press
- Silver Tears and Time (2006) ISBN 978-0-9764244-1-3 Quill and Parchment Press
- Contingencies (2008) ISBN 978-0-9764244-2-0 Quill and Parchment Press USA/WynterBlue Publishing Inc Canada
- Designing Movies: Portrait of a Hollywood Artist (2006) – Greenwood/Praeger ISBN 978-0-275-98690-2
- La Kalima (2010) ISBN 978-0-9764244-3-7 Quill and Parchment Press USA/WynterBlue Publishing Inc., Canada
- Empty Shoes: Poems on the Hungry and the Homeless ~ Editor Patrick T. Randolph ISBN 978-1-4495-1779-3 Popcorn Press (Oct. 2009)
- Many Mountains Moving – ISBN 978-1-886976-23-8
- Literary House Review ~ (Fall 2008)
- Emerging Urban Poets (June 2008)
- The League of Labouring Poets ISSN 1937-6499 (Best of Issue Award)
- Villanelles (March 2012); edited by Annie Finch and Marie-Elizabeth Mali; ISBN 978-0-307-95786-3; Everyman's Library/Random House UK
- Cradle Songs (April 2012) Editor: ISBN 978-0-9764244-5-1. Quill and Parchment Press
- Taj Mahal Review, edited by Dr. Santosh Kumar ISSN 0972-6004 Publisher: Cyberwit.net Webpage: tajmahalreview.com
- "Charles Manson: The Final Words" (2017)
- "Beverly Hills: 100 Years, 100 Stories" (2017)
- A Raga for George Harrison (October 2020) ISBN 978-93-88125-90-1 Taj Mahal Press/Cyberwit.net
- IMAGES: A Collection of Ekphrastic Poetry ISBN 978-93-88319-55-3 Publisher: Cyberwit.net
- The Trip: A richly Illustrated children's book ISBN 978-93-90202-97-3 Publisher: Cyberwit.net
