= Black Spurs =

1965 film by R. G. Springsteen

- Theatrical release poster
- Directed by: R. G. Springsteen
- Screenplay by: Steve Fisher
- Produced by: A. C. Lyles
- Starring: Rory Calhoun; Linda Darnell; Terry Moore; Scott Brady; Lon Chaney Jr. Richard Arlen; Bruce Cabot
- Cinematography: Ralph Woolsey
- Edited by: Archie Marshek
- Music by: Jimmie Haskell
- Production company: A.C. Lyles Productions
- Distributed by: Paramount Pictures
- Release date: June 1, 1965
- Running time: 81 minutes
- Country: United States
- Language: English

Black Spurs is a 1965 American Western film directed by R.G. Springsteen and written by Steve Fisher. The film stars: Rory Calhoun, Linda Darnell (in her final film role), Terry Moore, Scott Brady, Lon Chaney Jr., James Best, Richard Arlen, Bruce Cabot and scenes with James Brown and DeForest Kelley. The film was released on June 25, 1965, by Paramount Pictures.

== Plot ==
Santee (Rory Calhoun) becomes a bounty hunter to earn enough money to marry Anna (Terry Moore), the woman he loves. But, when he returns home to Kile, Kansas, he learns she has married Ralph Elkins (James Best), a sheriff, and left town.

Santee schemes with land baron Gus Kile (Lon Chaney Jr.) to ruin the town of Lark's reputation, so that the railroad scheduled to be built in Lark will, instead, be built in Kile. Santee arranges for a brothel madam, Sadie (Linda Darnell), and her girls to come to Lark. Reverend Tanner (Scott Brady) and other townspeople are appalled. Unknown until he arrives, Lark is Anna's new hometown and that her husband is the town's sheriff.

Things get out of hand in Lark; and when sheriff Elkins is tarred and feathered, and Pastor Tanner's right arm is broken for ringing the church bell relentlessly, Santee changes sides. He learns from Anna that her young son, Chad, is actually his son, who has been adopted by Ralph Elkins. Santee, with help of sheriff Elkins and Pastor Tanner, cleans up the community. After cleaning up Lark, but before riding out of town, Santee offers to financially help with Chad's welfare. Anna says no, that's not necessary, but Santee can send gifts to the boy as his Uncle Santee. Santee will keep his secret from the young lad. Santee thinks he may became a sheriff in some town that he believes needs him. He leaves Anna, Ralph and Chad with his best wishes.

== Cast ==
- Rory Calhoun as Santee
- Linda Darnell as Sadie (Her final film role; her death was on April 10, 1965, due to a house fire in Glenview, Illinois.)
- Terry Moore as Anna Elkins
- Scott Brady as Reverend Tanner
- Lon Chaney Jr. as Gus Kile
- Richard Arlen as Pete Muchin
- Bruce Cabot as Bill Henderson
- Patricia Owens as Clare Grubbs
- James Best as Sheriff Ralph Elkins
- Jerome Courtland as Sam Grubbs
- DeForest Kelley as Sheriff Dal Nemo
- Joseph Hoover as Swifty
- James Brown as Sheriff
- Robert Carricart as El Pescadore
- Barbara Wilkin as Mrs. Rourke
- Jeanne Baird as Mrs. Greta Nemo
- Sandra Giles as Sadie's Girl - 1st
- Sally Nichols as Sadie's Girl - 2nd
- Rusty Allen as Sadie's Girl - 3rd
- Joseph Forte as Banker
- Guy Wilkerson as Henry
- Lorraine Bendix as Henry's Wife, Mabel
- Read Morgan as Blacksmith
- Patricia King as Kyle Townslady
- Chuck Roberson as Prisoner Norton
- Howard Joslin as Prisoner Cobb
- Max Power as Doctor
- William Bickmore as Chad Elkins
- Manuel Padilla Jr. as Manuel Reese

== See also ==
- List of American films of 1965
