= Lost, Lonely and Vicious =

1958 film

- Directed by: Frank Myers
- Written by: Norman Graham (writer)
- Produced by: Charles M. Casinelli (producer)
- Starring: See below
- Cinematography: Ted Saizis; Vincent Saizis
- Edited by: Howard G. Epstein; Herbert R. Hoffman
- Music by: Gil Baumgart; Fredrick David
- Distributed by: Howco
- Release date: 1958
- Running time: 73 minutes
- Country: United States
- Language: English

Lost, Lonely and Vicious is a 1958 American film directed by Frank Myers.

== Cast ==
- Ken Clayton as Johnnie Dennis
- Barbara Wilson as Helen Preacher
- Lilyan Chauvin as Tanya Pernaud
- Richard Gilden as Walt
- Carol Nugent as Pinkie
- Sandra Giles as Darlene
- William Quimby as Pig
- Allen Fife as Buddy
- Frank Stallworth as Mr. Preacher
- Clint Quigley as Reporter
- Jim Reppert
