= Slice and Dice: The Slasher Film Forever =

2012 documentary film by Calum Waddell

Slice and Dice: The Slasher Film Forever is a 2012 documentary feature directed and produced by Calum Waddell and edited and produced by Naomi Holwill. The two had previously set up their High Rising Productions company to make documentary supplements for the DVD market. The film had its world premiere at the Sitges Film Festival in October, 2012.

== Overview ==
A celebration of slasher cinema - from Psycho to the present day, with a focus on highlighting many of the genre's forgotten cult classics, deconstructing how to survive a slice and dice movie and meditating upon why it is almost always a final girl and rarely a final guy. Among the films many interviewees are Corey Feldman, Mick Garris, Tobe Hooper, Tom Holland, Eduardo Sánchez, Patrick Lussier, Norman J. Warren, Felissa Rose, Scott Spiegel, Fred Olen Ray, Jeffrey Reddick, John Carl Buechler, Emily Booth, Adam Green, Marysia Kay, J.S. Cardone.

== Release ==
Slice and Dice: The Slasher Film Forever was only released in the UK, possibly because the clips used to highlight the documentary are from the catalogue of 88 Films.

== See also ==
- Going to Pieces: The Rise and Fall of the Slasher Film
