= A Lust to Kill =

1958 film

- Theatrical release poster
- Directed by: Oliver Drake
- Screenplay by: Tom Hubbard, Samuel Roeca
- Story by: Tom Hubbard, Samuel Roeca
- Produced by: Patrick Betz, A.R. Milton
- Starring: Jim Davis, Don Megowan, Allison Hayes
- Cinematography: Glen MacWilliams
- Edited by: Everett Dodd
- Music by: George Brand
- Production company: Production Associates
- Distributed by: Barjul International Pictures
- Release date: August 1, 1958
- Running time: 69 minutes
- Country: United States
- Language: English

A Lust to Kill is a 1958 American Western film directed by Walter Grauman and starring Jim Davis, Don Megowan, and Allison Hayes. The film is also known as Lust to Kill, A Time to Kill, and Border Lust.

== Plot ==
Cowboy Cheney Holland (Don Megowan) and his brother Luke rob of a load of rifles but later are abandoned by the rest of their gang. The pursuing lawmen, including their former friend Marshal Matt Gordon (Jim Davis), chase the brothers, eventually killing Luke and apprehending Cheney. With his girlfriend Sherri (Allison Hayes) on his side, Cheney Holland escapes and seeks to avenge his younger brother. While Holland chases his previous gang of criminals led by Isaac Stansil (Gerald Milton), Holland is himself pursued by the stubborn Marshal Gordon. Holland eventually catches up with Stancil, killing him. Meanwhile, Gordon apprehends Sherry and uses her to lure Holland; the two meet in a dramatic showdown, and Holland is killed.

== Cast ==
- Jim Davis as Matt Gordon
- Don Megowan as Cheney Holland
- Allison Hayes as Sherry
- Gerald Milton as Isaac Stancil
- Tom Hubbard as Kane Guthrie
- Claire Carleton as Minny
- John Holland as McKenzie
- Rickie Sorensen as Jeff
- James Maloney as Stockton
- Robert Williams as Glover
- Fred Sherman as Baxter
- Tony Turner as Laurie
- Sandra Giles as Belle
