= Leland Faust =

American financial advisor

Leland H. Faust
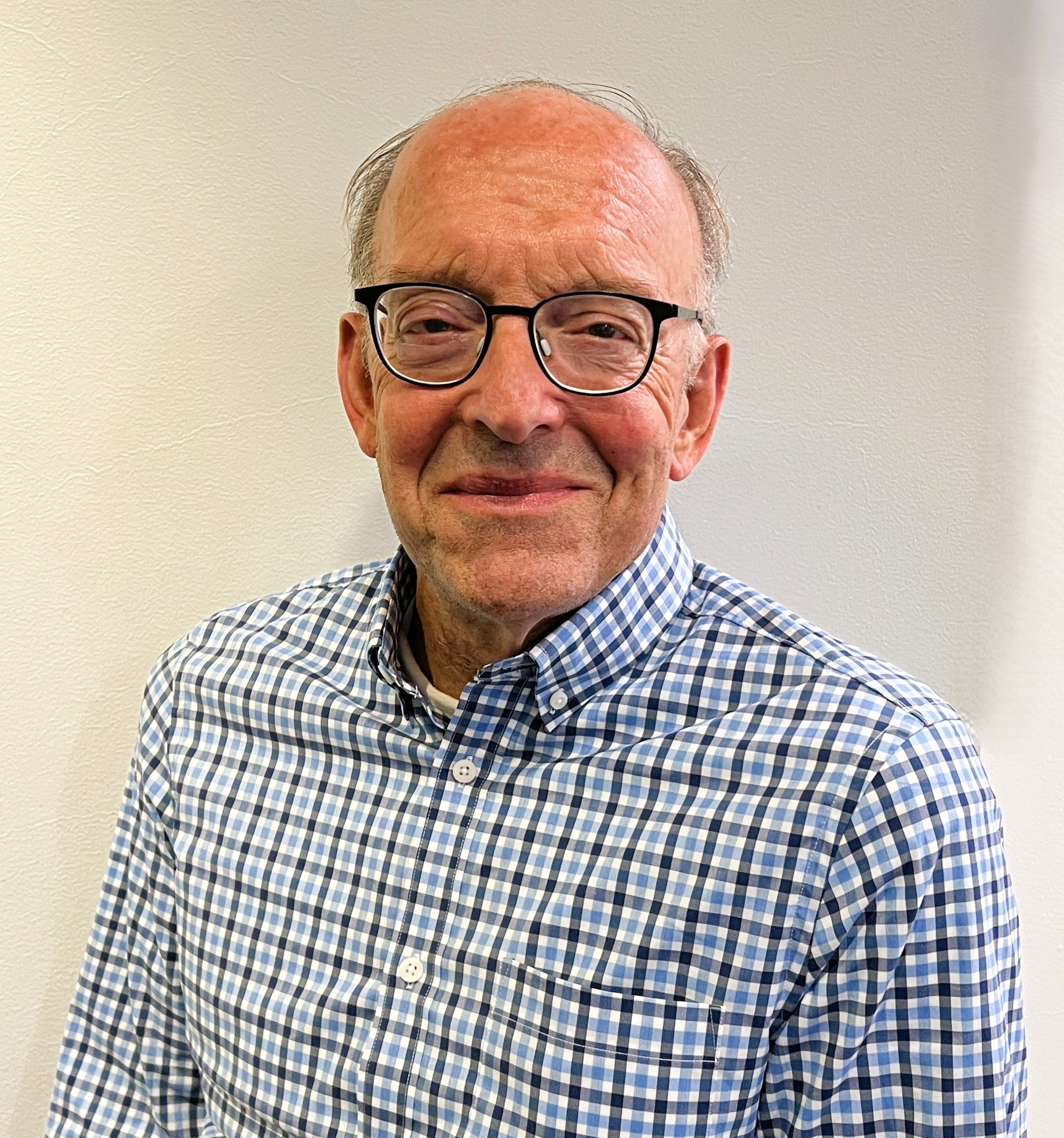
- Education: Cal Berkeley, Harvard Law School
- Occupations: Financial advisor, author
- Known for: Career Sports International Capital Management (CSI), Alfred J. Hitchcock Testamentary Trust

Notes
- Voice of Leland Faust

Leland H. Faust is a financial advisor and author. His company, Career Sports International Capital Management (CSI) (currently called CSI Capital Management) advises athletes on contracts, taxes, investments and choosing an agent. By 2001 CSI handled over 200 pro athletes. In 2001, 2007, 2009 and 2010, Barron's named Faust to their list of top 100 investment managers. Southwest Airlines in 2003 called him one of the most "influential people in today's world of professional sports".

== Early life and education ==
Faust was born in 1946. He was a water polo player and swimmer at the University of California, Berkeley. He graduated from Harvard Law School. In 2001, Faust still held the record for the Golden Gate Swim race.

== Career ==
Beginning as a tax attorney, he advised wealthy clients about tax shelters and over time developed an interest in investments and the securities industry. In the early 1970s when he was starting his career as a tax attorney, he had thought that his love of sports would remain separate from his world in finance, but then he started reading about professional athletes making poor financial decisions.

Faust, himself a former collegiate water polo player at Cal Berkeley, started Career Sports International Capital Management (CSI) in San Francisco in 1978 with partner Don Hill. They had heard stories about investment advisors swindling their clients and decided help was needed. Their first sports clients were "members of baseball's San Francisco Giants".

He knew that professional athletes are unique investors and require special handling as they can be preyed upon. Large amounts of money at an early age without a financial education plus their trusting nature, "a tendency fostered ... by the team nature of their competition", can make athletes prone to scams. He said that athletes are risk-takers and competitive which can influence their investments. Faust advocates for more conservative investing, making decisions based on where they are currently in their career, recognizing that they have an "abbreviated arc". In 1986 when Technical Equities (TE) went bankrupt, it liquidated the investments of 70 sports figures. According to Faust, "One reason athletes fall prey to bad deals is that many of them make a lot of money in a relatively short time. They tend to be young and inexperienced in money matters and have marquee value as well as money to offer." When Faust visited with Harry Stern from Technical Equities at the request of his client basketball player Phil Smith who had $140,000 invested in TE, Faust said that Stern gave a "silky-smooth sales pitch" but he felt it was too "canned" with more "style than substance". Faust became alarmed when "TE accounts could not clearly explain a bewildering series of transactions between several interests in a real estate deal", and as a result, Faust advised Smith to quickly remove his money from TE.

Athletes need to plan for strikes and lockdowns as well. Making major lifestyle changes and purchasing a new home might need to be deferred in order to set money aside. During labor disputes, owners may suspend checks while arbitrators argue over specifics, and months can pass with no income. Some of the professional athletes CSI represented are basketball players Kevin Garnett, Tim Duncan, Rik Smits and Nick Van Exel, Footballer Joey Galloway and baseball player Paul O'Neill. When there are work stoppages the "public almost always sides with management" according to Faust, "because they see the athletes as overpaid players, not underpaid workers". The top 100 of any career are going to make a lot of money and the public may not realize that a professional athlete may only play for four years, and if one season they can't play because of a dispute, then that player has lost a quarter of their career income. A benefit of working with sports superstars according to Faust is that "[T]he sports business is almost recession-proof".

Endorsements of products and services can be lucrative to pro athletes during and after their peak years, and even unknowns who win medals at the Olympics become household names and earn money quickly. Advertisers know that being aligned with an Olympian is potentially good for their products, because "even without saying anything it means excellence". According to Faust, these athletes need to learn that they have peak years for earning from their name, and that "a diversified portfolio works best". Keeping debt low and not counting on endorsements is important, because being contacted by advertisers can be hit or miss, and it can take months before money comes in.

In 1997, CSI started the CSI Equity Fund, opening it up to public investors. It was listed on the Schwab Mutual Fund OneSource program without transaction fees. Morningstar in 2001 gave CSI a five-star rating. Faust stated that they have a "long-term approach and a low turnover", noting that staying diversified within various sectors is a "part of the strength of the fund". By 2001, CSI had over 200 professional athletes as clients. Faust was named by The Sporting News as "one of the 100 most powerful people in sports". In 2001 Barron's named Faust in their top 100 investment managers. And again in 2007, 2009, and 2010. The New York Times profiled Faust and the CSI Equity Fund in their Money & Business column in 2002.

In 2003 Southwest Airlines interviewed Faust about the most common financial mistakes made by athletes. Faust replied that pressure is put on them to have the biggest home, the most expensive cars and to over extend themselves. Discussions with team members encourage risky financial behaviors. Then there is family pressure to take care of parents, siblings, cousins and friends, but better to "protect themselves first and accumulate[ing] their own significant wealth, they can [then] protect their family". The financial magazine, Barron's, in 2009 listed Faust and CSI as number 29 on their list of top 100 financial managers and stated they had more than $962 million in assets.

== Hitchcock Trust ==
In the late 1940s director Alfred Hitchcock retained the tax firm then known as the Law Offices of Samuel Taylor which had been recommended by director David O. Selznick. In the 1940s "federal tax laws ate up to 90 percent of all earnings above $200,000 a year". Hitchcock was looking for a legitimate tax shelter to protect his money. Faust became Taylor's partner in 1975 after working as an associate for four years. Faust and partner Steven Kravitz manage the Alfred J. Hitchcock Testamentary Trust which oversees all commercial use of Hitchcock's image, name, likeness, voice and silhouette. In a 1955 interview with The Recorder Faust noted some of the criteria used to decide who will receive permission for such uses. In particular, he said that "the use [must be] dignified and profitable". Patricia Hitchcock O'Connell, the daughter of the director, works together with Taylor and Faust to make this determination.

== Selected publications ==
- Faust, Leland (2016). A Capitalist's Lament: How Wall Street Is Fleecing You and Ruining America. Skyhorse. ISBN 978-1510713628.

== Professional organizations and associations ==
- Alfred J. Hitchcock Testamentary Trust
- Center for Inquiry - Board of Directors

== Personal life ==
Into his 50s Faust competed regularly in triathlons. In 2001 Barron's reported that Faust has made the "annual swim from Alcatraz to San Francisco" for the last thirty years.
