= Albert Bernhardt Faust =

American scholar of German studies

Albert Bernhardt Faust (April 20, 1870 in Baltimore – February 8, 1951) was an American scholar of German studies.

== Biography ==
After attending the German Zions School in Baltimore, he entered Johns Hopkins University, where he graduated in 1889 and took the degree of Ph.D. in 1892. He studied and traveled abroad at German universities from 1892 to 1894. He was instructor in German at Johns Hopkins, 1894–96, associate professor of German at Wesleyan University, Connecticut, 1896–1903. From 1903 to 1904 he was assistant professor of German at the University of Wisconsin and in 1904–10 at Cornell University, becoming full professor in the latter year. He retired from Cornell in 1938.

Under his guidance, the German department at Cornell became one of the major centers for German-American studies in the United States. He was a member of the Modern Language Association of America, the German Goethe Society, the Steuben Society and the American Dialect Society. He published a two volume work titled The German Element in the United States in 1909 which covered the German immigrant experience and impact on resulting American culture.

== Works ==
- Charles Sealsfield (Carl Postl), Der Dichter beider Hemisphären ("Charles Sealsfield, the poet of both hemispheres," 1897) An expanded version of his Cornell dissertation.
- The Problematic Hero in German Fiction (1901)
- Development of Goethe's Ethical and Religious Views (1902)
- Defense and Interpretation of Book IX of Wolfram's Parzival (1903)
- Friedrich Spielhagen (1905)
- The German Element in the United States (1909; Ger. trans. 1911) This was his major achievement, for which he was awarded the Conrad Seipp Memorial Prize by the University of Chicago and the Loubat prize by the Royal Prussian Academy of Sciences.
- Guide to the Materials for American History in Swiss and Austrian Archives (1915)
- A List of Swiss Emigrants to the American Colonies (1920, 1925)
- The Bank War [a play] (1944)

He edited:

- Zschokke's Tales (1895)
- Heine's Prose (1909)
- Christoph Martin Wieland, Oberon as translated by John Quincy Adams (1940)
