= Martin Faust =

Martin Faust may refer to:

- Martin Faust (actor) (1886–1943), American actor
- Martin Faust (1901–1923), German bank clerk, one of the list of Nazis killed in the Beer Hall Putsch
- Martin Faust (Texas politician) (1887–1972), state senator, District 21, President pro tempore of the Texas Senate, 36th Legislature
