= Rowley Faust =

Australian rules footballer

Personal information
- Full name: Roland Faust
- Born: 21 February 1899; Kensington, Victoria
- Died: 24 June 1959 (aged 60); Parkville, Victoria
- Original team: Brunswick
- Height: 176 cm (5 ft 9 in)
- Weight: 71 kg (157 lb)

Playing career^{1}
Years	Club	Games (Goals)
1923	Carlton	13 (0)
- ^{1} Playing statistics correct to the end of 1923.

Rowley Faust (21 February 1899 – 24 June 1959) was an Australian rules footballer who played with Carlton in the Victorian Football League (VFL).
