= Christopher Faust =

German hockey coach and trainer

Christopher Faust (born 4 December 1968 in Frankfurt/Main, known as Chris Faust) is a German hockey coach and trainer. He was able to achieve various national and internal successes with several teams.

After graduating from secondary school, he underwent a commercial education to become a professional of trade and commerce (IHK). In addition, he is a state-licensed trainer of the German Olympic Sports Confederation (DOSB as well as sports and association manager (IHK). Before taking up the coaching job, he has worked with Nestlé Deutschland for 10 years. In 2015 he began working as a speaker. Together with author Sabine Hahn, he has published the first volume of the children book series "Die Hockey-Kids" (ISBN 978-3-94-0877-28-4) in the Casimir Verlag. At times Chris Faust was part of the field hockey podcast “Schusskreis” of the Deutsche Hockey Zeitung. Since November 2023, he has been a permanent member of the leading German field hockey podcast “Viertelpause”, which is produced by the Berlin-based media agency Upchoice. Every week, he discusses the most exciting topics in the world of field hockey with his fellow presenters and journalists Sören Wolke and Tim Schäflein.

== Sporting career ==
=== As a player ===
Starting in 1972, he picked up his first hockey stick at the age of 4, first playing for Eintracht Frankfurt, then from 1978 on he played for SC SAFO Frankfurt (Frankfurter Sportclub Sachsenhausen Forsthausstraße). He was a member of the Hesse youth state team and participated in many Southern German and German championships. When he was 17, he moved back to Eintracht Frankfurt and played regional league and Bundesliga for the club. After two cruciate ligaments and several knee surgeries, he decided to take up the role of the player and coach in the fourth and fifth division as well as a youth team at SKG Frankfurt.

In 1995, he moved back to Eintracht Frankfurt again and he played one more season in the 2nd Bundesliga and the regional league. In addition, he also worked as assistant coach for the women's and men's team.

=== As a coach (club level) ===
From 1998 until October 2001, he was the head coach at Höchster THC and achieved several promotions into the fourth division and regional league. At the same time, he acquired his C-, B- and A-training licenses at the Bundesleistungszentrum (BLZ) in Cologne. Furthermore, he was the youth selector for the Hesse youth state teams from 1998 until 2004.

From November 2001 until May 2002, he was the playing coach at TGS Vorwärts Frankfurt and from July 2002 until March 2004, he was the head coach at Limburger HC for the 1st and 2nd men's Bundesliga teams as well as for several youth teams.

From 2002 until 2004, he was assistant coach of the U16 male youth national team and became European champion with that team during this spell. In that time, he participated at several training courses of the German Hockey Association (DHB) as a guest student and assistant coach and worked with the U16, U18, U21 and men's squad.

From 2003 until 2009, he was athletic manager at MTV Kronberg and from July 2004 until the unfortunate withdrawal due to financial reasons in October 2004, he was head coach of the regional league team of SAFO Frankfurt. Subsequently, from November 2004 until June 2006, he was head coach at SC Frankfurt 1880 for the women's team in the 1st and 2nd Bundesliga and for youth teams. From August 2006 until January 2008, he was head coach at Limburger HC for the men's team in the regional league as well as in the 2nd Bundesliga.

From 2007 until 2010, he completed his education course to become a state-licensed trainer at the DOSB in Cologne. During the 208/2009 season, he worked as head coach for Wiesbadener THC and had a graduand job at SV Wehen Wiesbaden in the 2nd football Bundesliga in the area of game analysis/game evaluation. His spell at Hanauer THC as head coach for the 1st women's and men's team needed to end in April 2009 for health reasons. From October 2009 until February 2011, he was athletic manager and association manager at HC Bad Homburg. From August 2011 until February 2012 he was the U14 girls’ team and 2nd women's team coach as well as the assistant coach of the 1st women's team.

Since March 2012, he has been working as a full-time youth trainer at SAFO Frankfurt.

=== As a coach (international level) ===
At the Indoor Hockey World Cup 2007 in Vienna, He reached the 6th place as special coach of the Australian women's hockey team. From August 2010 until 2011, he was national coach of the Swiss U16 male team. From December 2010, he was head coach of the Czech women's team and achieved the 6th place at the Indoor Hockey World Cup in Poznan/Poland in 2011.

From April 2012 until August 2015, he was head coach and sporting director at the Czech Hockey Federation and achieved the bronze medal at the Indoor Hockey World Cup 2015 as well as the promotion from the B to the A pool for European championships in field hockey.

Since September 2015, he is the high performance head coach of the Schweizer Landhockey Verband and is also involved with trainer education in order to install a long-term and sustainable high performance concept. With Chris as head coach, the men's national team avoided relegation to the B pool at the European Indoor Hockey Championships in 2016. The Swiss women's national team gained promotion to the A pool in January 2016 with him as head coach.

== Honours as a trainer ==
woman's hockey

- 2004 Promotion to the first Indoor Bundesliga, SC Frankfurt 1880 women
- 2007 6th place Indoor Hockey World Cup in Vienna as special coach of the Australian women's team
- 2010 6th place Indoor Euro Championships in Poland
- 2011 6th place Indoor-World Cup, Poznan
- 2011 German Field Hockey champion, U14 girls Mannheimer HC
- 2012 2nd place U21 women's Field Hockey-Euro Championships, B-Pool, Russia, Promotion to the A-Pool
- 2012 5th place Indoor-Euro Championships, Leipzig
- 2012 Hockey World League Round 1, Prague
- 2012 2nd place U21 women's Field Hockey-Euro Championships, B-Pool, Russia, Promotion to the A-Pool
- 2013 qualified for the second round in Valencia
- 2013 2nd place U21 women's Indoor-Euro Championships
- 2013 2nd place Field Hockey-Euro Championships, C-Pool, Athens, Promotion to the B-Pool
- 2014 5th place Indoor-Euro Championships, A-Pool, Prague, direct qualification for the World Cup in 2015
- 2014 7th place Field Hockey U21 Euro Championships, A-Pool, Belgium,
- 2014 3rd place Hockey World League, A-Teams and qualification for the second round
- 2015 3rd place Indoor-World Cup
- 2015 Field Hockey Euro-Championships, B-Pool, Promotion to the A-Pool
- 2016 2nd place Indoor-Euro Championships, B-Pool, Cambrai, Promotion to the A-Pool

men's hockey

- 2000 - 2005 various fourth division premierships
- 2003 Promotion to the Indoor Bundesliga, Limburger HC men
- 2012 5th place Olympic Games Qualifier, Japan
- 2012 3rd place Hockey World League, Round 1, Prague
- 2013 8th place, Field Hockey-Euro Championships, A-Pool, Boom/Belgium
- 2014 2nd place Hockey World League, Round 1, Czech Republic
- 2014 6th place Indoor-Euro Championships, A-Pool, Vienna, direct qualification for the World Cup 2015
- 2015 1st place U21 Indoor-Euro Championships, promotion to the A-Pool
- 2015 9th place, Indoor-World Cup
- 2016 Indoor-Euro Championships, A-Pool, Prague, Euro-Championships and World Cup qualification
