= The Steagle =

1971 film by Paul Sylbert

- Directed by: Paul Sylbert
- Written by: Irvin Faust (novel); Paul Sylbert (screenplay)
- Produced by: Jim Di Gangi
- Starring: Richard Benjamin; Chill Wills; Cloris Leachman
- Cinematography: Burnett Guffey
- Edited by: Thomas Stanford
- Music by: Fred Myrow
- Distributed by: AVCO Embassy Pictures
- Release date: September 15, 1971 (New York)
- Running time: 87 minutes
- Country: United States
- Language: English

The Steagle is a 1971 American comedy film based on the novel of the same name by Irvin Faust. The film was directed by Paul Sylbert and starred Richard Benjamin. The film concerns the personality change which overcomes the protagonist during the Cuban Missile Crisis (1962), and the film's title implicitly references the transient nature of the Steagles NFL team, existing for only the 1943 season during a national crisis.

Paul Sylbert wrote a 1974 book, Final Cut, about his mostly unhappy experiences making the film.

== Plot ==
During the Cuban Missile Crisis, a professor decides to live out all of his dreams, travelling across the country and taking on a different persona in each city.

== Cast ==
- Richard Benjamin as Harold Weiss, B.A., M.A., Ph.D.
- Chill Wills as Tall-Guy McCoy
- Cloris Leachman as Rita Weiss
- Jean Allison as Florence Maguire
- Suzanne Charney as Marcy (as Suzanne Charny)
- George Mann as Dean Briggs
- Ivor Francis as Reverend
- Susan Tyrrell as Louise
- Jack Bernardi as Marty Panesh
- Susan Kussman as Joan
- Peter Hobbs as Dr. Payne
- Joseph Bernard as Max Levine
- Frank Christi as Mr. Forbes
- Diane Ladd as Mrs. Forbes
- Harold Reynolds as Dr. Plymile
- Warren Munson as Man on train
- Lew Palter as Older Man
- Minta Durfee as Old Lady (uncredited)

== Production ==
In his book about making the movie, Final Cut: The Making and Breaking of a Picture, writer-director Paul Sylbert wrote that he was pressured by Avco Embassy into casting bit part actress Sandra Giles [whom he gave the pseudonym "Sally Wyles"] in a major supporting role, even though she was totally inadequate for the part, lacking acting talent. Sylbert wrote that the production of the picture was made contingent on her being cast in the part, as it turned out she was the mistress of a top executive at Avco, the conglomerate that acquired Joseph E. Levine's Embassy Pictures in 1967.

Facing cancellation of The Steagle, he did cast her, with no intention of using her. Sylbert rescheduled the shooting of Giles' scenes to the latter part of the picture, then used another actress in the part. In his book, he writes that the picture being taken away from him during the editing/preview process and being brutally recut was partially due to the producers' anger over him double-crossing them over Giles.

== See also ==
- List of American films of 1971
