= Chris Faust =

American landscape photographer

Christopher C. Faust (born 1955 in Fort Riley, Kansas) is a landscape photographer in St. Paul, Minnesota. He holds a degree in biology from St. Cloud State University and an MS in educational media from St. Cloud State University.

He is best known for his panoramic photographs of landscapes. From 1990 to 1996 he created a series of black-and-white images of new suburban development, especially in Minnesota, USA. Many of these depict new structures and spaces not yet fully formed, and not yet inhabited by people. A frequent theme in these and other series is the intersection of human beings with nature, and places where the two interact in visually provocative ways.

An example is "The Edge, Eden Prairie, MN" which is in the collection of the Walker Art Center. This photograph appears to be a split, double image, but is actually a single scene, depicting where a suburban development near Minneapolis, Minnesota runs up against prairie vegetation. The imported, landscaped vegetation, especially the central tree, conifers, and lawn grass balance the smaller native tree and prairie grass of the other half, as the condominiums loom from a corner.

Other of his series include outdoor industrial scenes typical of the northern Midwest, like grain elevators and railcars, rural landscapes from Minnesota and Appalachia, and color photographs of natural scenes.

Faust's work is exhibited regularly in galleries around Minnesota. His work appears in a number of institutions and is held by the permanent collections of the Walker Art Center, Minneapolis Institute of Arts, Weisman Art Museum, and San Francisco Museum of Modern Art.

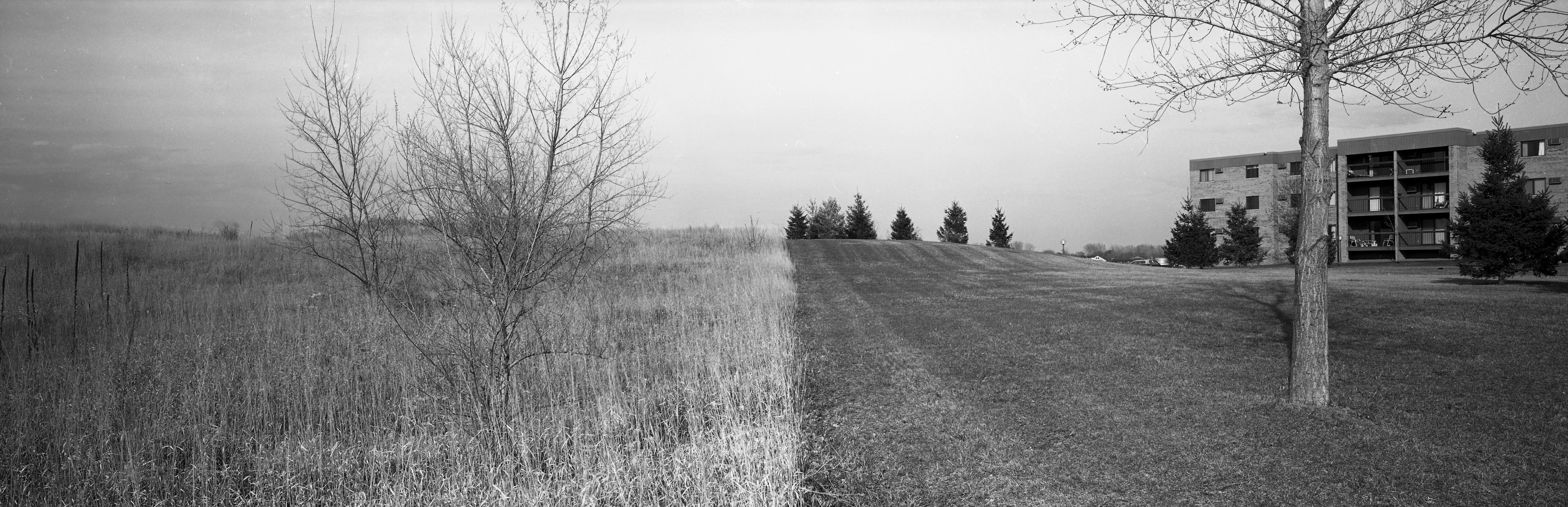

Twenty of Faust's photographs, many of them from his Suburban Documentation Project, illustrate the 1997 book Placing Nature: Culture and Landscape Ecology, edited by landscape architect Joan Iverson Nassauer, and including essays by novelist Jane Smiley and philosopher Marcia Muelder Eaton. Faust has been honored with McKnight Foundation Fellowships in 1989, 1992, and 1997. Faust is now a media teacher at Gordon Parks High School, St.Paul MN..

Faust takes a majority of his photographs using a specially designed Fuji G617.

== Awards ==
- 2016 Knight Arts Challenge Grant for work on Transforming Central
- 2014 Minnesota State Arts Board, Artist Initiative Grant
- 2014 Graham Foundation
- 2000 Graham Foundation
- 1997 McKnight Foundation Fellowship for Photography
- 1996 Graham Foundation
- 1995 Minnesota Humanities Commission
- 1995 Bush Fellowship
- 1994 Minnesota State Arts Board Fellowship
- 1993 American Society of Landscape Architects, National Honor Award in Communications.
- 1992 McKnight Foundation Fellowship for Photography
- 1989 McKnight Foundation Fellowship for Photography
