= Siegmar Faust =

German writer and human rights activist

Siegmar Faust (born 12 December 1944 in Dohna, Germany) is a German writer and human rights activist. He was a political prisoner in the GDR, and from 1996 to 1999, he was the State Commissioner for Stasi documents in Saxony.

== Early life and education ==
Faust was the son of a technical illustrator, Ingeborg Kayenberg, and Iosif Konstantinou, a Cypriot POW. His father was a British soldier in the Anti-Hitler Coalition. Faust took his surname from his stepfather, who died of complications relating to asbestosis in 1977. Faust's mother committed suicide in 1996.

Faust grew up in Heidenau, near Dresden, and in 1964 graduated from the High School at the Children's and Youth Sports School in Dresden. He then began studying art education and history at the University of Leipzig, but in 1966, after organizing a reading of uncensored poetry, some of which was reportedly "anti-Party," he was charged with "lack of discipline and political unreliability" and put on probation. He was forced to spend a year working in a rayon factory.

In 1967 he was permitted to resume studying at the Johannes R. Becher Literature Institute at the University of Leipzig, but was expelled in 1968 on grounds of "subversive incitement" after writing a poem that mentioned the popular uprising of 17 June 1953. (In 1993, after the fall of Communism, the university acknowledged that his expulsions had been politically motivated.)

== Early career in East Germany ==
Faust went on to become a writer, although he earned his living mostly as a laborer, and, later, as a transport worker.

He became a member of a circle of artists that included Wolfgang Hilbig, Gert Neumann, and Andreas Reimann. Unable to publish in East Germany, he circulated his writings privately. Beginning in 1968, the Stasi monitored his movements and had him followed. In 1971, he was detained in Leipzig on charges of "subversive incitement" for seeking to publish his works in the Federal Republic. He was amnestied without trial, however.

In 1973, he officially applied to emigrate and signed a petition charging the East German government with denying its citizens human rights in violation of UN agreements. He was again arrested for "subversive incitement" and sentenced by the District Court of Dresden to four and a half years in prison.

== Imprisonment ==
During the 1970s, he spent a total of 33 months in prison. He spent over 400 days in a so-called "tiger cage," a damp, cold basement cell. While in one prison he established the SED – Central Organ New Germany, which issued the handwritten newspaper Poor Germany, which was passed from hand to hand. But Faust was more than 400 days in a double-barred, damp and cold basement cell ("tiger cage") caught kept. Fellow inmates smuggled ink cartridges and butter into his cell. He spent over two years in solitary confinement before being released early in March 1976 as a result of protests in East Germany and abroad. In September 1976 he was permitted to leave the country for West Germany.

== West Germany ==
From 1976 to 1989, Faust worked as a freelance writer and screenwriter, as a lecturer, and as chief editor of the magazines DDR Today and Christians over There.

== United Germany ==
From 1996 to 1999, he served as the Saxon State Commissioner for the Stasi Files in Saxony. From 2003 to 2006, he studied philosophy, political science, and theology at Würzburg. Since the former prison at Cottbus was converted into a museum, he has worked there as a curator and witness.

== Works ==
- Die Lehr- und Wunderjahre des Faustus Simplicissimus (1979)
- In welchem Lande lebt Mephisto? (1980)
- Ich will hier raus (1983)
- Ein jegliches hat sein Leid (1984)
- Menschenhandel in der Gegenwart (1986)
- Der Freischwimmer (1987)
- Der Provokateur (1999)

== Movie screenplays and documentaries ==
- Freiheit, die ich meine. Über Christen und Marxisten in der DDR (1979)
- Sehnsucht nach einer Orgel (1983)
- Auch dies ist mein Land (1986)
- Wir dachten, der Krieg ist vorbei (1996)
- Gegen das Vergessen. Zeit-Zeugen im DDR-Museum Pforzheim. 10 Porträts, Pforzheim (2006)

== Memberships, personal life, and other activities ==
Since the late 1980s, Faust has been a member of the International Society for Human Rights (ISHR), of which he is now a trustee. From 1987 to 1990 he was Editor-in-Chief of GDR Today, a magazine published by the ISHR, and Associate Editor of the Brüsewitz Centre's magazine Christians over There.

He is Chairman of the Association of Political Persecution of Communism (VPVDK) and of the Association Against Forgetting. He is a board member of the Cottbus Human Rights Centre. In 2013 he was curator of the exhibition Plaid Cloud - Political Persecution 1933-1989. He is a member of the Presidium of the Free German Authors Association.

Faust has five sons and a daughter, and currently lives in Berlin.
