= Berthold Faust =

Sea eagle, detail (1978)

Berthold Faust is a German artist (b. 1935, Hofheim am Taunus), noted especially for his realistic and detailed drawings of nature and animals. To achieve accuracy in the tiniest detail, he uses specimens prepared by museums, photographs, and even microscopes. Formative in his career was the private training he received from Ludwig Meidner, who was associated with the Hofheimer Künstlerkreis, a group of artists associated with Hofheim.

== Career ==
Berthold Faust originally trained as a printer and typographer. For a number of years after completing his studies and practical training, he worked in three different ad agencies in Frankfurt, first for four years as a layout assistant, then for seven years as art director, and finally for two years as a creative director. All this time he studied painting privately, with Josef Faust, Oswald Fach, Wilhelm Görlich, and Ludwig Meidner. Dissatisfied with the world of advertising and the lack of personal involvement in his work, he sought solace in nature and in 1974 he became a full-time independent illustrator.

While at first he was noted for his illustrations of the historic city of Hofheim, he quickly turned to the natural world and especially birds; the 1970s proved a good time, given the resurgence of interest in nature in Germany. Faust's 1977 publication Rettet die Vögel ("Save the birds") was a German bestseller. Since then he has illustrated many books aimed at the education about and preservation of nature. Faust's work has been exhibited many times, and in 1995 his exhibition Natur in Portraits—Bilder von Berthold Faust traveled Germany. He is considered one of the most important illustrators of nature in Germany whose illustrations are frequently used (and whose opinions sought) in newspaper stories about threatened species.

== Selected bibliography ==
Boxkampf der Hasen (1980)

- Rettet die Vögel (Gütersoh: Horst Stern, 1977)
- Rettet die Wildtiere (Stuttgart: Rudolf Schreiber, 1980)
- Rettet die Frösche (Stuttgart: Rudolf Schreiber, 1983)
- Naturschutz in der Gemeinde. Praktischer Ratgeber für Jedermann, with Claus-Peter Hutter and others (Stuttgart, 1985)
- Wunderland am Wegesrand, with Claus-Peter Hutter (Stuttgart: Thienemann, 1988)
- Schützt die Reptilien Claus-Peter Hutter (Stuttgart/Vienna, 1994)
- Wo Tiere und Pflanzen leben: Unsere Lebensräume entdecken, with Ulrich Schmid (Stuttgart, 2006)

== Selected exhibitions ==
The Bird, in honor of Charlie Parker (1989)

- Bonn, Museum Koenig, 1981
- Middelhagen, Natur in Portraits—Bilder von Berthold Faust, 1995
- Berchtesgaden, Natur in Portraits—Bilder von Berthold Faust, 1995
- Hofheim, Stadtmuseum, Sehenswerte Natur, 1996
