= Jean Satterthwaite Faust =

Jean Satterthwaite Faust is an American women's rights activist.

== Early life ==
Faust was born March 19, 1930, in Tarboro, North Carolina. She was the eighth of nine children born to Hattie Lee Bradley Satterthwaite and George Dewey Satterthwaite, tenant farmers. According to Faust, "Our family was saved from poverty by the Roosevelt New Deal, specifically the Resettlement Act, which leased abandoned farms on long-term mortgages to families who needed a boost."

After trying several locations in the resettlement program, the family settled into a farm on Blue Sky Road near Halifax, North Carolina.

Faust described her childhood on the farm:

The whole family worked very hard. Children who could not do farm work took care of smaller children and helped around the house, brought water, etc. On Blue Sky Road, we had a cooperative system of working on crops like tobacco that were very labor intensive. One day we would work at one farm, another day we would go to a neighbor. The whole area was like a big family; all the boys were like brothers to me. Farm work was extremely boring and repetitive, but the worst part was that we had to miss weeks of school in the fall to help with the harvesting. We grew corn and peanuts; the peanuts required a lot of handwork.

Faust attended school in Halifax and Weldon, North Carolina. Like many farm children in the area, she was taken out of school each fall to help with the harvest.

In high school, Faust participated in Girls State at the University of North Carolina at Greensboro. She was the top-ranked student in her junior year and, following local tradition, was the grand marshal of graduation her senior year.

Due to a lack of funds, Faust did not consider attending college until a teacher gave her $200 collected anonymously from local citizens to fund her further education. She attended and graduated from the University of North Carolina at Greensboro, majoring in English and drama with a minor in education. After graduation, she worked as an English and drama teacher in Kannapolis, North Carolina.

In October 1953, Faust moved to New York. She worked in retail, eventually becoming a buyer at Elizabeth Arden. In 1962, she retired from retail for health reasons. While out of the labor market, she assisted her husband, Irvin Faust, with his manuscripts.

== Political work ==
In the early 1960s, Faust joined a Reform Club on the Upper West Side. She was soon frustrated by the division of labor.

As she explained:

All the work of the club, especially mailings, was done by the women while the men stood around talking. Presidents were always men; secretaries were women. I watched these unreformed practices for about a year and then started talking to the women. I set up a committee on women's rights. We elected a woman as president and I was elected treasurer (having refused to run for secretary). Some of the men were furious about my activities, some were amused, a few were understanding, even sympathetic. A few women were active supporters, but many were reluctant, afraid of the men's disapproval.

Around 1963, Faust became an aide to Congressman William Fitts Ryan on environmental issues, a new political area at the time. In 1966, she was asked to form the first local chapter of NOW. As she explained:

As organizing president I prepared the Chapter Kit, held Chapter meetings; answered mail, sent mailings all without benefit of office space, equipment, supplies or secretary. Any available area of our small apartment was office; our phone was NOW's phone. Equipment and supplies were cadged where members worked; only stationery, stamps and paper were purchased. We had no expense account. Later, as we gained membership, there was limited reimbursement. My husband suffered many inconveniences because of my work with NOW and paid for it, both in money and inconveniences. He also paid for my trips to meetings and conventions...I handled mailings on NOW proposals for New York State Constitutional Convention (up to 10 pages, 200 packets no copying equipment, no Xerox machine) to all delegates about six times. I made appearances at hearings, did mailings to women's groups asking support for proposals. (In those early days, little support was forthcoming from women's groups; their causes were peace, anti-nuclear efforts and social issues such as care of children and poverty; they did not comprehend that there were women's issues.)

Faust was president of the New York chapter of NOW from 1966 to 1967. She was continuously involved in their leadership through 1970, holding a range of roles. She was chair of the EEOC commission from to 1967 to 1970, National Legislative co-chair from 1968 to 1970, and national board of directors from 1968 to 1969.

Much of Faust's work focused on gender discrimination in hiring. She worked on the successful campaign to end gendered job postings in newspapers. In 1967, she helped organize an action for Pauline Dziob, a stewardess for Moore-McCormack Lines who had been denied job as yeoman (clerk-typist) due to her gender, despite having done the job during a male co-worker's absence. In 1968, Faust was alerted by Sonia Pressman from the EEOC that the Senate Finance Committee had included an amendment onto a soil conservation bill that would allow large companies to treat men and women differently in retirement policies, forcing women to retire earlier with fewer benefits. She rallied support to object to this attack on the rights of working women.

Due to her previous job at Elizabeth Arden, Faust was called on by Betty Friedan before a 1969 press conference to cover a black eye given to her by her abusive husband. Due to Faust's make-up skills, the bruise was undetectable in photos from the press conference.

In 1970, Faust resigned from Congressman Ryan's office and her position running the NYC chapter of NOW due to poor health after contracting tuberculosis.

From 1982-2009, Faust volunteered with the New York City Ballet and the School of American Ballet.

== Personal life ==
Born: March 19,1930 Tarboro, NC

Died: July 8, 2026 Chesterfield, VA

Faust married author Irvin Faust on August 29, 1959. They remained married until his death.

== Organizations ==
National Organization for Women activities:

- 1966-67 First President of the first chapter of National Organization for Women; NOW - New York
- Vice President NOW
- Chair of the Committee on the EEOC
- 12/1968 - 03/1970: National NOW legislative Co-Chair
- 1968-69 National NOW, board of directors
