= Richard Sylbert =

American production designer and art director (1928–2002)

- Publicity Photo of Richard Sylbert
- Born: April 16, 1928; Brooklyn, New York
- Died: March 23, 2002 (aged 73); Los Angeles, California
- Occupations: Production designer; art director; producer
- Spouses: Carol Godshalk (m. 1951–1967) Susanna Moore (m. 1973–1978) Sharmagne Leland-St. John (m. 1991)
- Children: 5
- Relatives: Paul Sylbert (twin brother)
- Writing career
- Years active: 1953–2002

Richard Sylbert (April 16, 1928 – March 23, 2002) was an American production designer and art director, primarily for feature films.

== Early life ==
Sylbert was born in Brooklyn, New York, to Samuel and Lily (Lazell) Sylbert, and was the twin brother of Oscar-winning production designer Paul Sylbert. Richard fought in the Korean War and attended the Tyler School of Art at Temple University in Elkins Park, Pennsylvania. His grandfather, Ribac, was a journalist in his native Romania before immigrating to the United States.

== Career ==
Sylbert began his career in the early days of television, designing productions of Hamlet (1953) and Richard II (1954) for the Hallmark Hall of Fame. His first film credit was Patterns (1956), a big screen adaptation of an Emmy Award-winning teleplay by Rod Serling. He went on to design Baby Doll, A Face in the Crowd, The Fugitive Kind, Murder, Inc., Splendor in the Grass, Walk on the Wild Side, Long Day's Journey into Night, The Manchurian Candidate, The Pawnbroker, Lilith, Who's Afraid of Virginia Woolf?, The Graduate, Rosemary's Baby, Catch-22, Carnal Knowledge, Chinatown, Shampoo, Reds, Frances, The Cotton Club, Tequila Sunrise, Dick Tracy, The Bonfire of the Vanities, Carlito's Way, Mulholland Falls, My Best Friend's Wedding, and Trapped. He worked multiple times with directors Roman Polanski, Elia Kazan, Mike Nichols, and Warren Beatty.

Robert Evans named Sylbert his successor when he relinquished his position as production chief at Paramount Pictures in 1975. Sylbert oversaw The Bad News Bears, Nashville, and Days of Heaven before being replaced in 1978.

Sylbert was nominated for the Academy Award for Best Art Direction six times and won twice, for Who's Afraid of Virginia Woolf? and Dick Tracy. He won the BAFTA Award for Best Production Design for Dick Tracy. He was nominated for an Emmy for his production design of the set for the long-running television sitcom Cheers. In 2000, Sylbert was honored with the Art Directors Guild Lifetime Achievement Award. In 2002, Sylbert was to receive the Hollywood Film Festival's Life Achievement Award. His widow gave the committee permission to name the award after him in perpetuity and that year it was given to Harold Michelson, his longtime art director and colleague.

Sylbert died of cancer at the age of 73 at the Motion Picture & Television Country House and Hospital in Woodland Hills, California. At the time of his death, Sylbert was married to Native American poet Sharmagne Leland-St. John, mother of one of his daughters, Daisy Alexandra Sylbert-Torres, a costume designer and Echo Park boutique owner. He had three sons, Douglas, Jon and Mark, with his first wife, Carol Godshalk, and another daughter, Lulu, with writer Susanna Moore. Lulu acted as a child, playing Paul Le Mat's half-alien daughter in Strange Invaders.

== Film and television credits ==
Year	Title	Credit type	Notes
1953	Hamlet	Production designer	Hallmark Hall of Fame telefeature
1954	King Richard II	Production designer	Hallmark Hall of Fame telefeature
1956	Baby Doll	Art director	
1960	Murder, Inc.	Production designer	
1961	Splendor in the Grass	Production designer	
1961	The Young Doctors	Production designer	
1961	The Connection	Production designer	
1962	The Manchurian Candidate	Production designer	
1962	Long Day's Journey Into Night	Production designer	
1962	Walk on the Wild Side	Production designer	
1963	All the Way Home	Production designer	
1963	East Side/West Side	Production designer	1963–1964 TV series
1964	Lilith	Production designer	
1964	The Pawnbroker	Production designer	
1965	How to Murder Your Wife	Production designer	
1966	Grand Prix	Production designer	
1966	Who's Afraid of Virginia Woolf?	Production designer	Academy Award for Best Art Direction (Black-and-White) shared with George James Hopkins
1967	The Graduate	Production designer	
1968	Rosemary's Baby	Production designer	
1969	The April Fools	Production designer	
1970	Catch-22	Production designer	
1971	Carnal Knowledge	Production designer	
1972	Fat City	Production designer	
1973	The Day of the Dolphin	Production designer	
1974	Chinatown	Production designer	Academy Award nominee
1975	The Fortune	Production designer	
1975	Last Hours Before Morning	Production designer	TV movie
1975	Shampoo	Production designer	Academy Award nominee
1976	Partners	Production designer	Canadian feature. He was also credited for the 1982 film of same title.
1979	Players	Production designer	
1981	Reds	Production designer	Academy Award nominee for Art Direction-Set Decoration; co-nominee Michael Seirton
1982	Partners	Production designer	
1982	Frances	Production designer	
1982	Cheers	Production designer	1982–1993 TV series
1983	Breathless	Production designer	
1984	The Cotton Club	Production designer	Academy Award nominee
1986	Under the Cherry Moon	Production designer	
1987	"Heartbeat" (video)	Production designer	
1988	Tequila Sunrise	Production designer	
1988	Shoot to Kill	Production designer	
1990	Dick Tracy	Production designer	Academy Award for Best Art Direction shared with set decorator Rick Simpson
1990	The Bonfire of the Vanities	Production designer	
1991	Mobsters	Production designer	
1993	Carlito's Way	Production designer	
1993	Ruby Cairo	Production designer	
1996	Blood and Wine	Production designer	
1996	Mulholland Falls	Production designer	
1997	My Best Friend's Wedding	Production designer	
1997	Red Corner	Production designer	
2002	Unconditional Love	Production designer	
2002	Trapped	Production designer	

== Bibliography ==
- LoBrutto, Vincent (2002). The Filmmaker's Guide to Production Design. New York: Allworth Press. ISBN 978-1-58115-224-1.
- Sylbert, Richard; Townsend, Sylvia; Leland-St. John-Sylbert, Sharmagne (2006). Designing Movies: Portrait of a Hollywood Artist. Westport, CT: Praeger. ISBN 978-0-275-98690-2.
- Whitlock, Cathy (2010). Designs on Film: A Century of Hollywood Art Direction. New York: Harper Collins. ISBN 978-0-06-088122-1.
