= Paul Sylbert =

American screenwriter (1928–2016)

- Publicity Photo of Paul Sylbert
- Born: April 16, 1928; Brooklyn, New York, U.S.
- Died: November 19, 2016 (aged 88); Jenkintown, Pennsylvania, U.S.
- Occupation(s): Production designer, art director, set designer
- Years active: 1951–2008
- Spouses: Anthea Sylbert (divorced); Jeannette D'Ambrosio Sylbert (his death)
- Relatives: Richard Sylbert (twin brother)

Paul Sylbert (April 16, 1928 – November 19, 2016) was an American Academy Award-winning production designer, art director, and set designer who directed on occasion.

Born in Brooklyn, New York, the son of a dressmaker, Sylbert grew up in the borough's Flatbush neighborhood and graduated from Erasmus Hall High School in 1946. He fought in the Korean War and attended the Tyler School of Art at Temple University in Elkins Park, Pennsylvania with his identical twin brother Richard. Early in their careers, they collaborated on Baby Doll and A Face in the Crowd. Sylbert also attended the Hans Hoffman School of Art and The Actors Studio. He is a veteran of the United States Army and served in Korea. Sylbert was a member of the faculty at the Film and Media Arts department of Temple University in Philadelphia, Pennsylvania, where he taught courses in film studies. He also taught a course called Film: The Creative Process at Temple University in the Spring of 2014.

Sylbert died on November 19, 2016, at the age of 88.

== Filmography ==
=== Television (as designer) ===
- The Big Story (1951)
- The Home Show (1954)
- The Ira Hayes Story
- John Brown (1960)
- Songs for Sale
- Molly Goldberg
- Ford Theater
- Danger
- Suspense
- Studio One

=== Feature films (as designer) ===
- Roogie's Bump (1954)
- Baby Doll (1956)
- The Wrong Man (1956)
- A Face in the Crowd (1957)
- Country Music Holiday (1958)
- The Teenage Millionaire (1961)
- Without Each Other (1962)
- The Tiger Makes Out (1967)
- The Riot (1969)
- Bad Company (1972)
- The Drowning Pool (1975)
- One Flew Over the Cuckoo's Nest (1975)
- Mikey and Nicky (1976)
- Heaven Can Wait (1978)
- Hardcore (1979)
- Kramer vs. Kramer (1979)
- Resurrection (1980)
- Wolfen (1981)
- Blow Out (1981)
- Without a Trace (1983)
- Gorky Park (1983)
- Firstborn (1984)
- The Journey of Natty Gann (1985)
- Ishtar (1987)
- Nadine (1987)
- The Pick-up Artist (1987)
- Biloxi Blues (1988)
- Fresh Horses (1988)
- Career Opportunities (1989)
- Rush (1991)
- The Prince of Tides (1991)
- Sliver (1992)
- Milk Money (1994)
- Free Willy 2 (1995)
- The Grass Harp (1995)
- Rosewood (1997)
- Conspiracy Theory (1997)
- To End All Wars (2001)

=== Stage (as designer) ===
- Susannah (1957)
- Tale for a Deaf Ear (1958)
- Street Scene (1958)
- The Crucible (1959)
- Carmina Buranna (1960)
- Oedipus Rex (1960)
- Festival of Two Worlds, Spoletto, Italy: The Angel of Fire (1959), Lulu (1974)
- The Agon of Gross - Off-Broadway (1952)
- The Making of Moo - Off-Broadway (1956)
- The Four Poster - Theatron Kentrikon, Athens, Greece (1957)
- Two For The Seesaw- Theatron Kentrikon, Athens, Greece (1958)
- The Miracle Worker - Theatron Dionysus, Athens, Greece (1961)
- Night of the Iguana - Coconut Grove Playhouse (1961)
- The Duchess of Malfi - The Mark Taper Forum (1974)

=== Stage direction ===
- Oedipus Rex, New York City Opera Company (1960)
- The Four Poster - Theatron Kentrikon, Athens, Greece (1957)
- Two for the Seesaw - Theatron Kentrikon, Athens, Greece (1958)
- The Miracle Worker - Theatron Dionysus, Athens, Greece (1961)

=== Television direction ===
- The Defenders (1963)
- The Nurses (1963)
- Mr. Broadway (1964)
- The Reporter (1964)

=== Commercial direction ===
- Over 50 spots including Clairol, Dash, Burma Shave, Belvedere Cigarettes, Belmont Park, etc.
- TV Graphics and Group Productions (1965–1968)

=== Industrial direction ===
- General Electric (1966)
- New York Telephone Co. (1967)

=== Feature film direction ===
- Instant Love - Herbert Richards Productions, Rio de Janeiro, Brazil (1963)
- The Steagle - Avco-Embassy Pictures, Inc. (1971)

=== Writer - film ===
- The Steagle - Avco-Embassy Pictures, Inc. (1971)
- Nighthawks - Universal Studios (1981)

=== Writer - books ===
- Final Cut - The making and breaking of a film, Seasbury Press/Continuum Books (1974)
- 100 Ways to Beat the Blues (contributor), Tanya Tucker, Simon & Schuster (2003)
- Cows: A rumination (contributor), Carl Hileman, Emmis Books (2004)

== Awards ==
- Academy Award - Heaven Can Wait (1978)
- Academy Award Nominee - The Prince of Tides (1992)
- Lifetime Achievement Award - Art Directors Guild (2009)
