= Night of the Living Dead (film series) =

Zombie horror film series created by George A. Romero

- Directed by: George A. Romero (1–6); The Paz Brothers (7)
- Screenplay by: George A. Romero (1–6); John A. Russo (1); Paolo Zelati (7); Joe Knetter (7); Robert L. Lucas (7)
- Produced by: Russell W. Streiner (1); Karl Hardman (1); Richard P. Rubinstein (2–3); Peter Grunwald (4–5); Mark Canton (4); Bernie Goldman (4); Sam Englebardt (5); Art Spigel (5); Ara Katz (5); Paula Devonshire (6); John Baldecchi (7); Sarah Donnelly (7); Suzanne Desrocher-Romero (7); Bob Yari (7); Shaun Sanghani (7); Ho-Sung Pak (7); George Furla (7)
- Distributed by: Continental Distributing (1); United Film Distribution Company (2–3); Universal Pictures (4); The Weinstein Company (5); Magnet Releasing (6); Magenta Light Studios (7)
- Countries: United States (1–7); Italy (2); Canada (6); South Korea (7)
- Language: English

Night of the Living Dead is a zombie horror media franchise created by George A. Romero beginning with the 1968 film Night of the Living Dead, directed by Romero and cowritten with John A. Russo. The franchise predominantly centers on different groups of people attempting to survive during the outbreak and evolution of a zombie apocalypse. The latest installment of the series, Survival of the Dead, was released in 2009, with a sequel, Twilight of the Dead, in post-production. This would be the first film in the series not directed by George Romero, who died on July 16, 2017, although he wrote the story.

== Background ==
After Night of the Living Dead's initial success, the two creators split over disagreements regarding where the series should head, and since the film was in the public domain, each was able to do what they wished with subsequent projects. Romero went on to direct five additional Dead films, while Russo branched into literary territory, writing Return of the Living Dead, later loosely adapted into a film of the same name that started its own franchise, and Escape of the Living Dead.

Labeled "Trilogy of the Dead" until Land of the Dead, each film is laden with social commentary on topics ranging from racism to consumerism. The films are not produced as direct follow-ups of one another; each is a standalone film without direct continuity in global events. Their only common thread is the epidemic of the living dead.

Each entry shows the world in a worsened state compared with the previous film, with an ever-increasing number of zombies, and the living perpetually endangered. Because each film is independent of its predecessor, it is wholly set within the era during which it was filmed; Land of the Dead is replete with 2005 technology like game consoles, flat-screen televisions and cell phones, for instance. The fifth film does not continue the timeline, instead showing events at the beginning of a zombie outbreak, similar to the first film. The films portray how different people react to the same phenomenon, ranging from citizens to police to army officials, and back to citizens again.

Romero does not consider any of his Dead films sequels since none of the major characters or story continue from one film to the next. The two exceptions are Tom Savini's Blades character who becomes a zombie in Dawn of the Dead and who is seen again years later in Land of the Dead; the other is the military officer (Alan van Sprang) who robs the main characters in Diary of the Dead and goes on to become a protagonist in Survival of the Dead.

=== Box Office and Financial Success ===
Produced on a meager budget of approximately $114,000, *Night of the Living Dead* became one of the most profitable independent films in cinema history. Despite its limited resources, the film resonated powerfully with audiences, grossing over $30 million worldwide (equivalent to over $250 million in 2024 when adjusted for inflation). This remarkable return represented an earning of over 263 times its original production budget, cementing its status as a commercial phenomenon.

=== Social Commentary and Cultural Legacy ===
Beyond its financial success, the film is widely celebrated for its subtextual social commentary. Released in 1968 during a period of intense social unrest, the film's casting of a Black actor (Duane Jones) in the lead role, combined with its bleak depiction of government incompetence and institutional failure, led critics to view it as a reflection of the Vietnam War era and racial tensions in America. Furthermore, by redefining the "zombie" from a creature of Haitian voodoo into a flesh-eating ghoul, the film laid the foundational blueprint for the entire modern zombie horror genre, heavily influencing subsequent pop culture, video games, and cinema.

== Films ==
Night of the Living Dead story chronology
Original continuity
- Night of the Living Dead (1968)
- Dawn of the Dead (1978)
- Day of the Dead (1985)
- Land of the Dead (2005)
- Twilight of the Dead (2027)
Reboot continuity
- Diary of the Dead (2007)
- Survival of the Dead (2009)

=== Main films ===
==== Night of the Living Dead (1968) ====
The plot of the film follows Ben (Duane Jones), Barbara Cole (Judith O'Dea), and five others, who are trapped in a rural farmhouse in Pennsylvania and attempt to survive the night while the house is being attacked by mysteriously reanimated corpses, known as ghouls or zombies.

==== Dawn of the Dead (1978) ====
Following the scenario set up in Night of the Living Dead, the United States (and possibly the entire world) has been devastated by a phenomenon which reanimates recently deceased human beings as flesh-eating zombies. Despite efforts by the US Government and local civil authorities to control the situation, society has effectively collapsed and the remaining survivors seek refuge. Protagonists Roger (Scott Reiniger) and Peter (Ken Foree), two former SWAT members, join with Stephen (David Emge) and Francine (Gaylen Ross), a helicopter pilot and his girlfriend planning on leaving the city, and take refuge in an enclosed shopping mall.

==== Day of the Dead (1985) ====
In the far future, zombies have overrun the world, and an underground army missile bunker near the Everglades holds part of a military-supported scientific team assigned to study the zombie phenomenon in the hopes of finding a way of stopping or reversing the process. Dwindling supplies, loss of communication with other survivor enclaves, and an apparent lack of progress in the experiments have already caused loss of cohesion among the scientists and soldiers. Dr. Logan (Richard Liberty), the lead scientist on the project, has been secretly using the recently deceased soldiers in his experiments, trying to prove his theory that the zombies can eventually be domesticated.

==== Land of the Dead (2005) ====
Many of the living have fled to Pittsburgh, Pennsylvania, where a feudal-like government has taken hold. Paul Kaufman (Dennis Hopper) rules the city with overwhelming firepower. "Big Daddy" (Eugene Clark), an unusually intelligent zombie, directs his fellow zombies to use firearms against the human defenses, and later leads the zombies in an assault on the human city, with the result that the electric fence that kept the zombies out now keeps the humans trapped inside.

==== Twilight of the Dead (2027) ====
Following the release of Diary of the Dead (2007) and Survival of the Dead (2009), Twilight of the Dead was conceived by George A. Romero as the concluding installment to his Living Dead zombie film series. Romero did not regard Diary and Survival as part of the overarching narrative from Night of the Living Dead (1968), Dawn of the Dead (1978), Day of the Dead (1985) and Land of the Dead (2005), and saw the fate of the zombies following Land of the Dead as an unresolved narrative element. Romero co-wrote a film treatment for the film with screenwriter Paolo Zelati, which was to be set on a tropical island in a decimated world where life has all but disappeared, and follow the last humans on Earth who are caught between factions of the undead, but Romero died from lung cancer in 2017.

In 2021, Romero's widow Suzanne Romero revived the project and oversaw the completion of the screenplay, with screenwriters Joe Knetter and Robert L. Lucas joining Zelati to finish the script, which would follow a woman and child who are the last human survivors as they search for safety on a once idyllic island now overtaken by nature and the undead. The writers watched archive videos of George A. Romero coming up with the original treatment as reference when creating the script. Suzanne Romero remained closely involved throughout the development process to ensure the film aligned with her late husband's vision, and sought to maintain the social commentary elements his previous Living Dead films were known for. Suzanne told The Hollywood Reporter, "This is the film he wanted to make. And while someone else will carry the torch as the director, it is very much a George A. Romero film."

The Machinist (2004) director Brad Anderson joined the project as director in 2023, describing Romero's original films as a major influence on his work and expressing a desire for Twilight of the Dead to continue the series' blend of horror with social commentary and humanistic themes. Twilight of the Dead is produced by Suzanne Romero, John Baldecchi, Sarah Donnelly, Paolo Zelati, and Stephanie Caleb of Ardvella Entertainment. Executive producers include Dominic Ianno, Alex Dundas, Jason Resnick, Chris Roe, and Luis Riefkohl.

In November 2024, Betty Gabriel and Milla Jovovich were announced to have been cast in the lead roles. Meanwhile, frequent Romero collaborators Greg Nicotero and his KNB EFX Group, who began their careers with Romero's Day of the Dead (1985), were announced to lead the prosthetic makeup effects. By the end of 2023, the script was completed, and the George A. Romero estate partnered with Los Angeles based financier-producer Roundtable Entertainment, with a planned late 2023 start date in Puerto Rico; however, production was delayed by the 2023 SAG-AFTRA strike. Production was set to begin filming in Puerto Rico on March 6, 2025, and wrap in April. Fortitude International launched sales for Twilight of the Dead at the American Film Market, partnering with Roundtable Entertainment to secure distribution for the film worldwide. In October 2025, Nicotero stated the film was securing additional financing, and that the film would depict a continued evolution of the zombies. In May 2026, Kate Beckinsale replaced Jovovich, while The Paz Brothers were tapped to direct replacing Anderson. In October 2026, filming officially wrapped.

=== Reboot films ===
==== Diary of the Dead (2007) ====
During the initial outbreak of a zombie pandemic, Diary of the Dead follows a band of film students making a horror movie who decide to record the events in documentary-style as they are chased down by zombies.

==== Survival of the Dead (2009) ====
Taking place shortly after the events of Diary of the Dead, the film follows the actions of former Colonel and current Sergeant "Nicotine" Crockett (Alan van Sprang). After a failed raid, Crockett deserts his post with fellow soldiers Kenny (Eric Woolfe), Francisco (Stefano Colacitti), and Tomboy (Athena Karkanis). The group encounters an island run by two families who are feuding over whether zombies should be kept alive or killed.

=== Other films ===
==== Road of the Dead (TBD) ====
The story focuses on zombie prisoners that race cars in a modern-day Coliseum for the entertainment of wealthy humans. Matt Birman was set to direct the film from a script he co-wrote with George Romero. It is one of Romero's four unproduced screenplays that Birman hopes to produce. As of August 2026, it remains in development hell.

== Official spin-offs ==
- Night of the Living Dead, the 1990 remake of the 1968 film, penned by Romero and directed by Dawn of the Dead and Day of the Dead effects artist Tom Savini.
- Dawn of the Dead, the 2004 remake of the 1978 film.
- Toe Tags Featuring George Romero (DC Comics), the 2004 comic book series by Romero about college workers investigating the cause of the zombie pandemic, adapted from one of his unused screenplays.
- Empire of the Dead (Marvel Comics), the 2013 comic book series written by Romero featuring the living dead and vampires in New York City.
- Road of the Dead: Highway to Hell (IDW Publishing), the 2019 comic book prequel to the film Road of the Dead, written by Jonathan Maberry. The film has still not been produced as of this date.
- The Living Dead (Tor Books), the 2020 epic novel co-written by Romero and finished posthumously by Daniel Kraus, spanning 15 years of the zombie outbreak. Kraus used various notes and manuscripts from Romero to finish the project, adding that "The movies came out in a completely random order as far as timeline. If you ignore the decade shifts, as he did...the timeline is, and I have this memorized now: Night of the Living Dead, Diary of the Dead, Survival of the Dead, Dawn of the Dead, Land of the Dead, and Day of the Dead. He'd only gone five years into the future. There's a lot of untrod ground that is not handled cinematically"; "When the book goes fifteen years into the future, the humans are down to a tiny little nub of survivors — the zombies start dying out, rotting and returning to the earth. It's grim, but a hopeful chance to rebuild society in a better way."
- The Rise (Heavy Metal), the prequel comic to Night of the Living Dead written by Romero's son G. Cameron Romero, depicting the origin story of the zombie outbreak. The project was originally intended to be a film, which started as an Indiegogo funding campaign in 2014 for Night of the Living Dead: Origins and later renamed Rise of the Living Dead. It is set at the height of the Cold War era, depicting a military scientist searching for a way to sustain human life in the event of a nuclear holocaust. Romero eventually scrapped the project and converted it into a comic book titled The Rise, to avoid potential studio interference and trademarking disputes. Chapters are published individually in issues of Heavy Metal magazine, and later collected into a single graphic novel. The first chapter was published in Heavy Metal #302 on November 20, 2020.

== Cast and crew ==
=== Cast ===
List indicators:

- A dark grey cell indicates that the character was not in the film or that the character's presence in the film has yet to be announced.
- A ^{Y} indicates a role as a younger version of the character.
- An ^{O} indicates a role as an older version of the character.
- A ^{U} indicates an uncredited role.
- A ^{C} indicates a cameo role.
- A ^{V} indicates a voice-only role.
- An ^{A} indicates an appearance through archival footage or stills.

Character	Films						
Character	Night of the Living Dead (1968)	Dawn of the Dead (1978)	Day of the Dead (1985)	Land of the Dead (2005)	Diary of the Dead (2007)	Survival of the Dead (2009)	Twilight of the Dead (2027)
Living Newscaster Undead Newscaster	Charles Craig				Charles Craig^{VC}		
Blades The Machete Zombie Assistant Head Biker Mechanic Zombie Shot Through Glass Zombie Hit By Truck		Tom Savini		Tom Savini			
Brubaker Sarge "Nicotine" Crockett				Alan van Sprang	Alan van Sprang	Alan van Sprang	
Photo Booth Zombies Newsreader				Simon Pegg	Simon Pegg^{VC}		
Photo Booth Zombies Newsreader				Edgar Wright	Simon Pegg^{VC}		
Tony Ravello					Shawn Roberts	Shawn Roberts^{A}	
Jason Creed					Joshua Close	Joshua Close^{A}	
Debra Moynihan					Michelle Morgan	Michelle Morgan^{A}	
Andrew Maxwell					Scott Wentworth	Scott Wentworth^{A}	
Tracy Thurman					Amy LaLonde	Amy LaLonde^{A}	

=== Crew ===
Crew	Film						
Crew	Night of the Living Dead (1968)	Dawn of the Dead (1978)	Day of the Dead (1985)	Land of the Dead (2005)	Diary of the Dead (2007)	Survival of the Dead (2009)	Twilight of the Dead (2027)
Director(s)	George A. Romero	George A. Romero	George A. Romero	George A. Romero	George A. Romero	George A. Romero	Doron Paz; Yoav Paz
Producer(s)	Russell W. Streiner; Karl Hardman	Richard P. Rubinstein	Richard P. Rubinstein	Mark Canton; Bernie Goldman; Peter Grunwald	Peter Grunwald; Art Spigel; Sam Englebardt; Ara Katz	Paula Devonshire	Suzanne Romero; Robert L. Lucas
Screenwriter(s)	John A. Russo; George A. Romero	George A. Romero	George A. Romero	George A. Romero	George A. Romero	George A. Romero	George A. Romero; Paolo Zelati; Joe Knetter
Composer(s)	None (Stock music)	The Goblins; Dario Argento	John Harrison	Reinhold Heil; Johnny Klimek	Norman Orenstein	Robert Carli	TBA
Cinematography	George A. Romero	Michael Gornick	Michael Gornick	Mirosław Baszak	Adam Swica	Adam Swica	TBA
Editor	George A. Romero	George A. Romero	Pasquale Buba	Michael Doherty	Michael Doherty	Michael Doherty	TBA
Production Companies	Image Ten	Laurel Group	Laurel Entertainment	Atmosphere Entertainment MM; Romero-Grunwald Productions	Artfire Films; Romero-Grunwald Productions	Artfire Films; Romero-Grunwald Productions; Devonshire Productions	Little Engine Productions; SSS Entertainment; Aanaxion
Distributor	Continental Releasing	United Film Distribution Company (US); Titanus (Italy)	United Film Distribution Company	Universal Pictures	The Weinstein Company	Magnet Releasing (US); Entertainment One Films (Canada)	Magenta Light Studios (US)

== Reception ==
=== Critical and public response ===
Film	Rotten Tomatoes	Metacritic	BFCA
Night of the Living Dead	95% (84 reviews)	—N/a	—N/a
Dawn of the Dead	92% (59 reviews)	—N/a	—N/a
Day of the Dead	61% (103 reviews)	—N/a	—N/a
Land of the Dead	75% (179 reviews)	71 (30 reviews)	63
Diary of the Dead	61% (131 reviews)	66 (29 reviews)	70
Survival of the Dead	29% (92 reviews)	43 (22 reviews)	61

=== Accolades ===
Awards
Motion Picture	Organization/Guild	Ceremony	Category	Name	Result
Night of the Living Dead	National Film Preservation Board (1999)	National Film Registry			Won
Dawn of the Dead
Dawn of the Dead	Academy of Science Fiction, Fantasy & Horror Films	7th Saturn Awards	Best Make-Up	Tom Savini	Nominated
Dawn of the Dead	Academy of Science Fiction, Fantasy & Horror Films	31st Saturn Awards	Best DVD Classic Film Release	Ultimate Edition	Won
Dawn of the Dead	International Press Academy	9th Annual Satellite Awards	Best Overall DVD	Anchor Bay	Nominated
Day of the Dead
Day of the Dead	Academy of Science Fiction, Fantasy & Horror Films	14th Saturn Awards	Best Make-Up	Tom Savini	Won
Day of the Dead	Sitges Film Festival (18 ed. 1985)	Maria	Best Actress	Lori Cardille	Won
Land of the Dead
Land of the Dead	Academy of Science Fiction, Fantasy & Horror Films	32nd Saturn Awards	Best Horror Film		Nominated
Land of the Dead	Academy of Science Fiction, Fantasy & Horror Films	32nd Saturn Awards	Best Make-Up	Howard Berger, Gregory Nicotero	Nominated
Land of the Dead	Directors Guild of Canada (2006)	DGC Craft Award	Outstanding Achievement In Picture Editing - Feature Film	Michael Doherty	Nominated
Land of the Dead	Directors Guild of Canada (2006)	DGC Craft Award	Outstanding Achievement In Production Design - Feature Film	Arvinder Grewal	Nominated
Land of the Dead	Directors Guild of Canada (2006)	DGC Craft Award	Outstanding Achievement In Sound Editing - Feature Film	Kevin Banks, Nelson Ferreira, Lee de Lang, Craig Henighan, Jill Purdy, Nathan Robitaille	Nominated
Land of the Dead	Empire Awards	11th Empire Awards	Best Horror		Nominated
Land of the Dead	Teen Choice Awards (2005)	Teen Choice Awards	Choice Summer Movie		Nominated
Diary of the Dead	Gérardmer Film Festival (2008)		Critics Award	George A. Romero	Won
Survival of the Dead	Venice Film Festival	66th Venice International Film Festival	Golden Lion	George A. Romero	Nominated

== See also ==
- Living Dead
- Zombie
