= John A. Russo =

American writer

John Russo
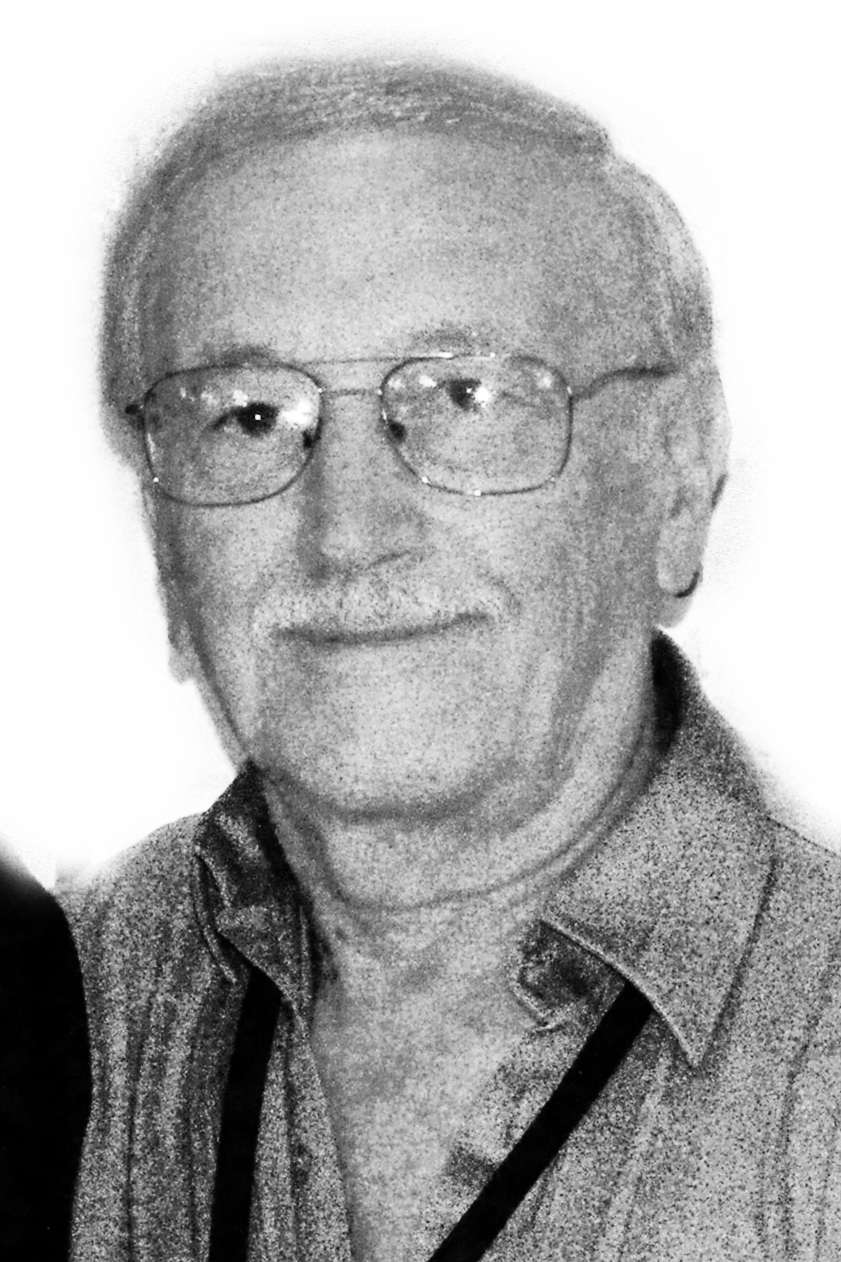
- Russo in 2012
- Born: September 2, 1939 (age 87); Clairton, Pennsylvania, U.S.
- Education: West Virginia University
- Occupations: Novelist, screenwriter, film director, actor
- Years active: 1968–present

John A. Russo (born September 2, 1939), sometimes credited as Jack Russo or John Russo, is an American novelist, screenwriter and film director. He is best known as the co-screenwriter of Night of the Living Dead (1968) alongside its director, George A. Romero. Russo would subsequently go on to become an author of horror fiction novels.

== Career ==
Russo was born and grew up in Clairton, Pennsylvania and lives in Glassport, Pennsylvania.

Russo attended West Virginia University while his friend Rudy Ricci attended Carnegie Mellon University in Pittsburgh. Ricci met George A. Romero at Carnegie Mellon and introduced Russo to Romero on Russo's Christmas vacation. After college, Russo was drafted into the army and served a two-year stint. Meanwhile, Romero with Russell Streiner formed The Latent Image to produce commercial films with the aim of eventually making a full-length feature film. When Russo got out of the army, he joined his friends in The Latent Image and soon plans were made for a feature film. Russo crafted a rough idea about a young man stumbling upon a host of ghouls feeding off human corpses. Romero loved the idea and a few days later he presented Russo with forty pages of a story based on the idea. The film ultimately became Night of the Living Dead which led to Romero's Dead series and the Living Dead series, with the latter based on a story by Russo.

Russo went on to author many novels and, like his friend Romero, began making films of his own. The Booby Hatch is a sex comedy released in 1976. Midnight is an adaptation of Russo's novel of the same name and released in 1982. His novel The Majorettes was adapted by Russo himself and directed by Bill Hinzman who played the Cemetery Zombie in Night of the Living Dead. Russo's next film was Heartstopper which features "name" actors Michael J. Pollard and Moon Unit Zappa. Russo considers it his favorite of the films he has directed.

Russo is also the founder and one of the co-mentors (along with Russell Streiner) of the John Russo Movie Making Program at DuBois Business College in DuBois, Pennsylvania.

== Filmography ==
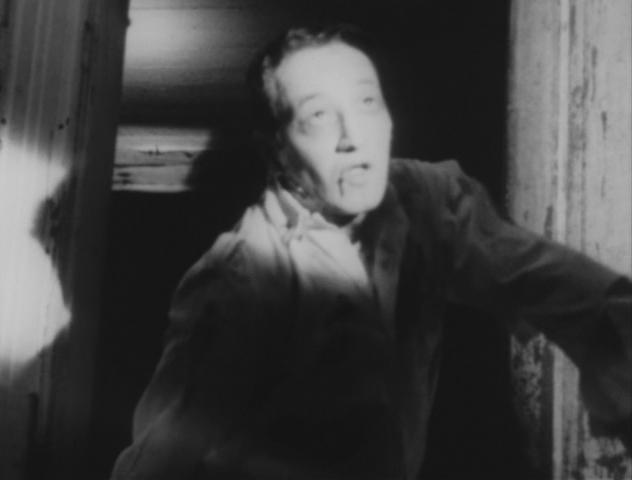
Russo playing a ghoul in Night of the Living Dead

Year	Film	Director	Writer	Producer	Notes
1968	Night of the Living Dead	No	Yes	No	Co-written with George A. Romero
1971	There's Always Vanilla aka The Affair	No	No	Yes	
1976	The Booby Hatch aka Dirty Book Store and The Liberation of Cherry Janowski	Yes	Yes	Yes	
1982	Midnight aka Backwoods Massacre	Yes	Yes	No	Also novel
1985	The Return of the Living Dead	No	Story	No	
1986	The Majorettes aka One by One	No	Yes	Yes	Also novel
1990	Night of the Living Dead	No	No	Yes	
1991	Voodoo Dawn aka Strange Turf (USA)	No	Yes	No	Also novel
1992	Scream Queens Swimsuit Sensations	Yes	No	No	
1993	Midnight 2 aka Midnight 2: Sex, Death and Videotape (USA: video title)	Yes	Yes	No	
1993	Heartstopper aka Dark Craving (USA: video title)	Yes	Yes	No	
1996	Scream Queens' Naked Christmas aka 'Tis the Season	Yes	Yes	No	
1996	Santa Claws aka 'Tis the Season	Yes	Yes	Yes	
1999	Night of the Living Dead: 30th Anniversary Edition	Yes	Yes	Co-Executive	Director, writer, and co-editor for new scenes
2001	Children of the Living Dead	No	No	Executive	
2002	Saloonatics	Yes	Yes	No	
2016	My Uncle John Is a Zombie	Yes	Yes	No	
2024	The Night They Came Home	No	Yes	Yes	
2026	Midnight 3	No	No	Yes	

=== As an actor ===
- My Uncle John is a Zombie (2016) as Uncle John
- House of Frankenstein 1997 (1997) (miniseries) as Honor Guard
- Santa Claws (1996) (as John Russo) as Detective
  - a.k.a. 'Tis the Season
- The Inheritor (1990) as Unknown role
- The Majorettes (1986) (as John Russo) as Dr. Gibson the Coroner
  - a.k.a. One by One
- There's Always Vanilla (1971) (uncredited) as Music producer
  - a.k.a. The Affair
- Night of the Living Dead (1968) (uncredited) as Washington military reporter/Ghoul in house

=== Documentary appearances ===
- More Brains! A Return to the Living Dead (2011) as Himself
- One for the Fire: The Legacy of Night of the Living Dead (2008) as Himself (also served as associate producer)
- UnConventional (2004) as Himself
- The Dead Walk: Remaking a Classic (1999) (V) as Himself

Note: this is a "making-of" special featured on the DVD edition of the 1990 remake of Night of the Living Dead.

- A-Z of Horror (1997) (mini) TV Series as Himself
  - a.k.a. Clive Barker's A-Z of Horror (UK: complete title)
- Night of the Living Dead: 25th Anniversary Documentary (1993) (V) as Himself

Note: this is a 25th Anniversary special featured on a video release of the original Night of the Living Dead film.

- Horror F/X (1989) (V) as Himself

Note: Russo interviews frequent collaborator and fellow Pittsburgh horror movie maker, Tom Savini, in this low-budget shot-on-video documentary.

- Drive-In Madness! (1987) as Himself
  - a.k.a. Screen Scaries (USA: video title)

== Bibliography ==
- Night of the Living Dead (1974) [Warner paperback Library] ISBN 0-446-76410-8
- Return of the Living Dead (1977) [Dale] ISBN 1-55197-508-4
- The Majorettes (1979) [Pocket Books] ISBN 0-671-82315-9
- Midnight (1980) [Pocket books] ISBN 0-67183-432-0
- Limb to Limb (1981) [Pocket Books] ISBN 0-671-41690-1
- Bloodsisters (1982) [Pocket Books] ISBN 0-671-41692-8
- Black Cat (1982) [Pocket Books] ISBN 0-671-41691-X
- The Awakening (1983) [Pocket Books] ISBN 0-671-45259-2
- Day Care (1985) [Pocket Books] ISBN 0-671-45261-4
- Return of the Living Dead (1985) -Novelization Version- [Arrow Books] ISBN 0-09-942610-2
- Inhuman [1986] [Pocket Books] ISBN 0-671-45262-2
- Voodoo Dawn (1987) [Imagine]
- Living Things (1988) [Popular Library] ISBN 0-445-20666-7
- The Complete Night of the Living Dead Film Book (1989) [Random House]
- Making Movies (1989) [Dell] ISBN 0-440-50046-X
- Scare Tactics (1992) [Dell] ISBN 0-440-50355-8
- How to Make Your Own Feature Movie for $10,000 or Less (1995) [Zinn P.G.] ISBN 0-935016-10-4
- Hell's Creation (1995) (Ravenmor) ISBN 1-55197-060-0
- The Sanity Ward (1995) (Ravenmor) ISBN 1-55197-532-7
- Undead (2010) (Kensington) ISBN 0-75825-873-9 (Omnibus of Night of the Living Dead and Return of the Living Dead)
- The Big Book of Bizarro (2011) (Burning Bulb Publishing) ISBN 0-615-50203-2 (Contains the short story Channel 666)
- The Hungry Dead (2013) (Kensington) ISBN 0-75828-499-3 (Contains the novel Escape of the Living Dead and the 1980 novel Midnight)
- Dealey Plaza (2014) (Burning Bulb Publishing) ISBN 0-615-96708-6
- Epidemic of the Living Dead (2018) (Kensington) ISBN 978-1-4967-1666-8
- Spawn of the Living Dead (2019) (CreateSpace Independent Publishing Platform) ISBN 978-1-5142-7849-9
- The Darkest Web (2022) (Wolfpack Publishing LLC) ISBN 9781639779314
- The Night They Came Home (2022) (Wolfpack Publishing LLC) ISBN 9781639779338
- The Unearthly (2022) (Wolfpack Publishing LLC)
- Weep No More (2022) (Wolfpack Publishing LLC)
- The Killing Truth (2022) (Wolfpack Publishing LLC)
- The Price of Admission (2022) (Wolfpack Publishing LLC)

=== Comics ===
With Avatar Press he is writing a number of comic books:

- Escape of the Living Dead
- George A. Romero's Night of the Living Dead
- Plague of the Living Dead
