= The Booby Hatch =

American comedy film

- Directed by: Rudy Ricci; John A. Russo
- Screenplay by: John A. Russo
- Based on: The Booby Hatch by John A. Russo
- Produced by: John A. Russo; Russell Streiner
- Starring: Sharon Joy Miller; Rudy Ricci; Doug Sortino; David Emge
- Release date: 1976
- Running time: 86 minutes
- Country: United States
- Language: English

The Booby Hatch (a.k.a. The Liberation Of Cherry Jankowski) is a 1976 American sex comedy film written and co-directed by John A. Russo. The film's co-directors both worked on Night of the Living Dead and the film features a cameo by David Emge who appeared in Dawn of the Dead.

== Cast ==
- Sharon Joy Miller as Cherry Jankowski
- Rudy Ricci as Marcello Fettucini
- Doug Sortino as Herman Longfellow
- N. Detroit as Theophilus Suck
- David Emge as Angelo Fettucini
- Ed Steinfeld as Papa Fettucini
- Virginia Heller as Mama Fettucini
- John Upson as Dr. Von Lipschitz
- Dana Christian as Eileen Lipschitz
- Herb Elliotte as Mr. Stag
- Mike Waterkotte as Vernon Biggs
- Allan Harris as Dr. Stuttgart
- Glenda Rozzo as Miss Peabody
- Norma Beardsley as Thelma
- Andrew Banas as Fred
- Diane Pugh as Angela
- George Kosana as Police Chief
- Nick Kazalas as Detective
- Don Gouanucci as Patrolman
- Bill Fleming as Joyful Narrator
- Raymond Laine as Reporter (uncredited)
- John A. Russo as Bearded Doctor / Various Characters (uncredited)
- Russell Streiner as Doctor / Masked Rapist (uncredited)

== Release ==
The film was released on DVD by Synapse Films in 2009.

== Reception ==
Slant Magazine gave the film one and a half stars and criticized the "ineptitude" of the filmmaking.
