= George Kosana =

American actor (1935–2016)

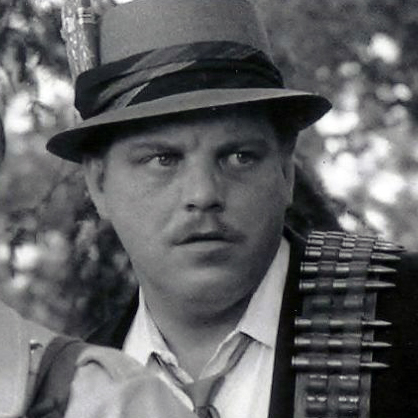
- Kosana as Sheriff McClelland in Night of the Living Dead (1968)
- Born: December 22, 1935
- Died: December 30, 2016 (aged 81); Clairton, Pennsylvania, U.S.
- Occupations: Cinematographer; actor; investor
- Years active: 1967–2016

George Kosana (December 22, 1935 – December 30, 2016) was an American actor, best known for his role of Sheriff McClelland in George A. Romero's Night of the Living Dead.

== Career ==
Kosana had been a member of Image Ten films, whereupon he worked on the crew and was one of the original ten investors in the 1968 classic. Kosana worked on other Image Ten films to include 'The Booby Hatch' and 'There's Always Vanilla', and had often made appearances at horror conventions. Concomitant with his film roles, Kosana worked in a steel mill in Clairton, Pennsylvania, an occupation which led to numerous heath issues. His last film, My Uncle John is a Zombie, wrapped shortly before his death. In this final film as well as Living Dead, Kosana reprised and lampooned his role as Sheriff McClelland in Night.

== Death ==
Kosana was found dead on December 30, 2016, at his home in Clairton, Pennsylvania. His death followed years of battling various illnesses, including emphysema/COPD and macular degeneration.

== Filmography ==
| Year | Title | Role | Notes |
|---|---|---|---|
| 1968 | Night of the Living Dead | Sheriff McClelland | |
| 1971 | There's Always Vanilla | Abortionist Thug #2 | |
| 1976 | The Booby Hatch | Police Chief | |
| 2009 | Incest Death Squad | George | |
| 2012 | Living Dead | Sheriff McClelland | (archive footage) |
| 2012 | Celluloid Bloodbath: More Prevues from Hell | Himself | |
| 2014 | Psychotic State | Himself | |
| 2017 | My Uncle John is a Zombie! | Sheriff McClelland | (final film role) |
