= Hellmaster =

- VHS cover
- Directed by: Douglas Schulze
- Written by: Douglas Schulze
- Produced by: David J. Dalton; Kurt Eli Mayry; Douglas Schulze
- Starring: John Saxon; David Emge; Amy Raasch; Edward Stevens
- Cinematography: Michael Goi
- Edited by: Sean Hoessli
- Distributed by: Dolphin Productions
- Release date: December 16, 1992
- Running time: 92 minutes
- Country: United States
- Language: English

Hellmaster (also known as Soulstealer and Them) is a 1992 American horror film written and directed by Douglas Schulze, and starring John Saxon. The plot follows a psychotic college professor who uses unsuspecting students as laboratory rats, injecting them with a drug that mutates them into brutal killers.

The film has been observed to be largely influenced by the Nightmare on Elm Street series – which also featured Saxon – as well as other popular horror titles such as Hellraiser.

== Plot ==
Part of a secret government eugenics project, crazed biochemistry professor Jones committed terrible crimes on his college campus in the late 1960s before one of his colleagues burned the college to put a deadly end to his spree. Jones is presumed dead, but a series of murders twenty years later raises questions of whether he has somehow managed to return. In actuality, Jones's drug experiments have turned him into a superhuman. Having teleported himself to safety during the fire, he has been living underground continuing his experiments. With an injection, he is able to turn people into mutants who will follow his will. With the help of his zombie-like army, Jones plans to access his stores of his "Nietzsche Drug" in the catacombs beneath the campus. Standing against him are three people: a psychic, a reporter and a woman who has already survived one supernatural attack. The psychic determines that she herself must take the Nietzsche Drug so she can face the mad professor and his mutant slaves.

== Cast ==
- John Saxon as Professor Jones
- David Emge as Robert
- Jeff Rector as Jesse Jameson
- Amy Raasch as Shelly O'Deane
- Edward Stevens as Drake Destry
- Sean Sweeney as Joel Johnson
- Melissa Zafarana as Tracy
- Jim Riethmiller as Harrold (credited as Jim Reithmiller)
- Robert Dole as Professor Damon
- Todd Tesen as Adam O'Deane
- Eric Kingston as Bobby Jones
- Neil Savedes as Joey Jones
- Suzanne Labatt as Moon Jones
- Ron Asheton as Mama Jones
- Janet Linck as Andrea
- James Croteau as Paul
- Steven E. Williams as Harvey (credited as Steve Williams)
- Becky Traynor as Beth
- Rebecca Jachman as Pam
- Anne Marie Reilly as Tiffany
- Valentina Agius as Chris (credited as Tina Ashley Agius)
- Sarah Barkoff as Little Girl

== Development ==
Hellmaster took director Douglas Schulze five years to complete.

== Home media ==
The film's initial home video release VHS was distributed through AIP in 1992.

The film was released on DVD on September 19, 2006 and includes audio commentary from director Schulze and one of the producers, along with a conceptual art gallery, and a behind-the-scenes gallery.

== Reception ==
Joe Bob Briggs reviewed Hellmaster, giving it 2 and a half stars, joking that the director "forgot to hire actors". CineMagazine rated the film 1 star. In a review at Blu-ray.com, Brian Orndorf said the film "has a lot of problems, but it's engaging as horror eye candy, giving fans plenty of blood and strange sights to hold their attention as Schulze fights to explore a lukewarm plot."
