= David Emge =

American actor (1946–2024)

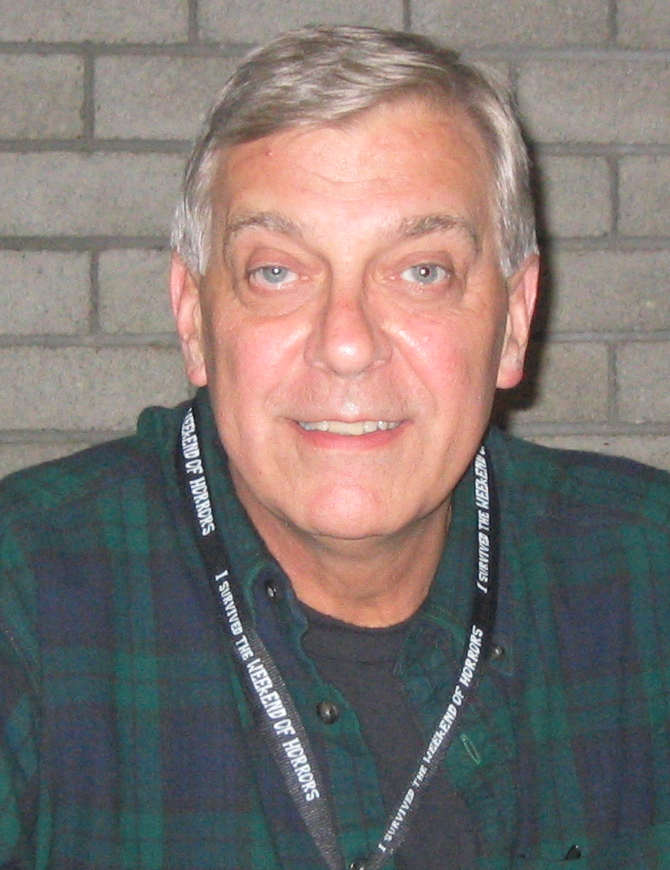
- Emge in 2006
- Born: David Michael Emge; September 9, 1946; Evansville, Indiana, U.S.
- Died: January 20, 2024 (aged 77); Evansville, Indiana, U.S.
- Occupation: Actor
- Years active: 1975–2007
- Notable work: Dawn of the Dead (1978)

David Michael Emge (September 9, 1946 – January 20, 2024) was an American actor. He was best known for playing Stephen "Flyboy" Andrews in George A. Romero's horror film Dawn of the Dead (1978).

== Life and career ==
David Michael Emge was born in Evansville, Indiana, on September 9, 1946. One of his classmates and acting partners while in college was Ron Glass, who later became famous as a starring member of the situation comedy Barney Miller. While working as a chef in a New York City restaurant, Emge met George A. Romero, who cast him in the role for which he would be most remembered, as Stephen in Romero's zombie epic, Dawn of the Dead (1978). Even until 2007, Emge still participated in occasional acting and film conventions. He died in Evansville on January 20, 2024, at the age of 77.

== Filmography ==
Year	Title	Role	Notes
1975	The Booby Hatch	Angelo Fettucini	
1978	Dawn of the Dead	Stephen "Flyboy" Andrews	
1990	Basket Case 2	"Half Moon"	
1992	Hellmaster	Robert	
