= Land of the Dead =

2005 post-apocalyptic horror film by George A. Romero

- Theatrical release poster
- Directed by: George A. Romero
- Written by: George A. Romero
- Produced by: Mark Canton; Bernie Goldmann; Peter Grunwald
- Starring: Simon Baker; Dennis Hopper; Asia Argento; Robert Joy; John Leguizamo
- Cinematography: Mirosław Baszak
- Edited by: Michael Doherty
- Music by: Reinhold Heil; Johnny Klimek
- Production companies: Atmosphere Entertainment MM; Romero-Grunwald Productions; Wild Bunch, S.A.; Rangerkim
- Distributed by: Wild Bunch (France, Benelux and French-speaking Switzerland); Universal Pictures (International)
- Release dates: June 18, 2005 (CineVegas); June 24, 2005 (US/CAN); August 10, 2005 (France)
- Running time: 97 minutes
- Countries: Canada; France; United States
- Language: English
- Budget: $15 million
- Box office: $47.1 million

Land of the Dead (also known as George A. Romero's Land of the Dead) is a 2005 post-apocalyptic horror film written and directed by George A. Romero; the fourth film in Romero's Living Dead series, a sequel to Day of the Dead (1985), followed by Diary of the Dead and Survival of the Dead in 2007 and 2009, respectively. A direct sequel to the film, Twilight of the Dead, will ignore the former two films and set to be released in 2027.

It was released in 2005, with a budget of $15–19 million, the highest in Romero's Dead series, and grossed $46 million.

The story of Land of the Dead deals with a zombie assault on Pittsburgh, Pennsylvania, where a feudal-like government exists. The survivors in the film have fled to the Golden Triangle area of downtown Pittsburgh, protected on two sides by rivers and on the third by an electric barricade termed "the Throat". Released in North America on June 24, 2005, Land of the Dead received mostly positive reviews from film critics.

== Plot ==
Years after the zombie apocalypse, the scattered remnants of human civilization have established a chain of protected city-states across North America. One such sanctuary is located in downtown Pittsburgh, ruled by a feudal-like government. Bordered on two sides by rivers and barricaded on the third with an electrified fence guarded by a militia, the city has become a relatively secure haven. Outside the city's barriers are barren countryside and dilapidated suburban towns long deserted by humans but overrun with numerous zombies. The rich and powerful live in a luxury high-rise called "Fiddler's Green", while the rest of the population subsists in squalor. All forms of commerce within this protected zone are controlled by Paul Kaufman, the city's ruthless plutocratic ruler who owns Dead Reckoning, an armored personnel vehicle that can easily travel through zombie-infested areas.

Riley Denbo, Dead Reckoning's designer and commander, and his crew pilot the vehicle into the no-man's-land to scavenge for necessary food and medical supplies for the citizens as well as luxury items to use as a means of barter within Kaufman's oppressive oligarchic regime. On one mission, they notice many zombies exhibiting intelligent behavior, especially former gas station attendant "Big Daddy". During the mission, rookie Mike is bitten by a zombie while trying to grab scattered cigarettes. Soon afterwards, Riley and Charlie Houk arrived. Realising that Mike has been bitten, Cholo DeMora initially intend to end his life but Riley shoots the undead instead. With no choice, Mike commits suicide, rather than being turned.

After the mission, Riley retires from commanding Dead Reckoning. Weary of a marginal existence in a post-apocalyptic city, he plans to depart for Canada once repairs on his car are finished. Back in the city, he discovers his car missing and he visits a pimp named Chihuahua, whose men were supposed to be fixing it. At Chihuahua's joint, he sees a prostitute named Slack being forced into a cage with some zombies to entertain guests. Riley and his best friend Charlie rescue Slack; after Charlie kills Chihuahua in the ensuing chaos, the trio are arrested. Slack reveals that Kaufman ordered her execution for assisting a resistance leader named Mulligan.

Meanwhile, Cholo is denied an apartment in Fiddler's Green despite assisting Kaufman in eradicating his political enemies. Cholo commandeers the vehicle and threatens to destroy Fiddler's Green unless Kaufman pays him a $5,000,000 ransom. Kaufman approaches Riley and tasks him, Charlie and Slack, with retrieving the vehicle.

After catching up with Dead Reckoning, Riley approaches the vehicle alone. Realizing Riley is working for Kaufman, Cholo holds both him and Charlie at gunpoint. As Cholo prepares to fire Dead Reckoning's missiles at Fiddler's Green, Riley deactivates the weapons systems remotely. Kaufman's stooge Motown opens fire and nearly kills both Riley and Cholo, but is bitten by a zombie and killed by Slack. Riley asks Cholo to come with him, but Cholo opts to confront Kaufman at Fiddler's Green. While en route, Cholo is bitten by a zombie, while Riley returns to Fiddler's Green in Dead Reckoning.

Big Daddy leads a legion of zombies across the river where they breach the perimeter fence, overpower the border guards, and invade the city. Kaufman flees but encounters a zombified Cholo in the parking garage, where Big Daddy kills both of them with an exploding propane tank. Riley's group manages to escape, where they use missiles to mercy-kill people being devoured by the zombies. Mulligan appears, revealing he rescued most of the poor people; he and Riley bid each other farewell before parting with their groups. Witnessing Big Daddy and the zombies leaving the city, sparing the surviving humans, Riley similarly decides to spare them, realizing that they also seek sanctuary. After lighting the remaining fireworks, Riley's group embarks for Canada on Dead Reckoning.

== Cast ==
- Simon Baker as Riley Denbo
- John Leguizamo as Cholo DeMora
- Dennis Hopper as Paul Kaufman
- Asia Argento as Slack
- Robert Joy as Charlie Houk
- Eugene Clark as Big Daddy
- Joanne Boland as Pretty Boy
- Tony Nappo as Foxy
- Jennifer Baxter as Number 9
- Boyd Banks as Butcher
- Jasmin Geljo as Tambourine Man
- Maxwell McCabe-Lokos as Mouse
- Tony Munch as Anchor
- Shawn Roberts as Mike
- Pedro Miguel Arce as Pillsbury
- Sasha Roiz as Manolete
- Krista Bridges as Monica Motown
- Bruce McFee as Mulligan
- Phil Fondacaro as Chihuahua
- Alan van Sprang as Brubaker
- Earl Pastko as Roach
- Peter Outerbridge as Styles
- Gene Mack as Knipp
- Devon Bostick as Brian
- Simon Pegg as Photo Booth Zombies #1
- Edgar Wright as Photo Booth Zombies #2
- Tom Savini as Blades The Machete Zombie
- Gregory Nicotero as Bridgekeeper Zombie

== Production ==
=== Development ===
After a decade of disinterest towards the zombie genre through the 1990s, zombies had begun to rise in popularity again in the 2000s after box-office hits like 28 Days Later (2002) and Shaun of the Dead (2004). This inspired George A. Romero to make his long-awaited fourth installment of the zombie series since its most recent installment, Day of the Dead, released in 1985. Romero had negotiated with 20th Century Fox, who wanted the film to be titled Night of the Living Dead. He refused, wanting to use the title Dead Reckoning, and the studio then wanted to title it Night of the Living Dead: Dead Reckoning. When Romero questioned the notion to have Night of the Living Dead in the title, it turned out that Fox sought to own the rights to the franchise, and he decided not to do business with them. Romero was offered a budget of $15 million-19 million after negotiating with Universal Pictures, making the film his highest-budgeted film in the series. He used this as a chance to draw upon on some elements he was not able to use on Day of the Dead, due to budget constraints.

=== Casting ===
Despite having a bigger budget with him this time than most of his films, Romero still wanted to cast lesser-known actors for the lead roles like Simon Baker and Robert Joy with exceptions being actors like Dennis Hopper and John Leguizamo, the former of which Romero cast after being impressed by most of his films. Romero cast Asia Argento for the role of Slack after working with her father, Dario Argento, on some of his films like Dawn of the Dead (1978) and Two Evil Eyes (1990). He also cast his longtime makeup artist friend, Tom Savini and Shaun of the Dead star Simon Pegg and director Edgar Wright for zombie roles, with Savini reprising his biker character, Blades, from Dawn of the Dead, now as a zombie and with Pegg and Wright appearing as Photo Booth Zombies.

=== Filming ===
Filming took place in Toronto and Hamilton, Ontario, Canada between October and December 2004.

== Release ==
The film received positive reviews upon release. It was released one year and three months after the release of the remake Dawn of the Dead. The film grossed over $40 million and is second behind Dawn of the Dead with the highest-grossing revenue (unadjusted for inflation) in the Living Dead series (not including the remakes), the two lowest being Night of the Living Dead (1968) and Diary of the Dead (2007). The film opened the MTV Saturday Horror block on February 27, 2010.

=== Ratings ===
Land of the Dead is the first film in the series to receive an MPAA rating for its theatrical release. Romero had said for years that he would film two versions: an R rated cut for theatrical release and first DVD, and an unrated cut for the second DVD release. Both DVDs were released in the U.S. on October 18, 2005. Rumors suggested that Romero shot alternate, less explicit, gore scenes for the theatrical release, but this is not entirely accurate. The more extreme instances of gore (e.g. a woman having her navel piercing graphically torn out by a zombie) were obscured by foreground elements filmed on bluescreen, so that these overlaid elements could be easily removed for the unrated DVD. Other ways to obscure blood to get an R-rating were achieved by simply trimming the grislier shots by a few seconds, by digitally repainting blood so that it is more black than red, or by digitally painting the blood out altogether.

British Columbia, Manitoba and Ontario gave both the theatrical version and DVD version a rating of 18A, though it was only given a 13+ rating in Quebec.

In the UK, the BBFC gave both the theatrical version and the unrated version a 15 certificate for strong language, violence, horror and gore. Every UK release bar the UMD version were rated 18 overall due to a bonus feature (a highlights reel of the goriest moments called Scenes of Carnage).

In Germany, both the theatrical and unrated versions were rated 18 anyway. As such, only the unrated version was widely available in Germany.

The film was banned in Ukraine.

== Reception ==
The film earned a 75% approval rating at the review aggregator website Rotten Tomatoes based on 179 reviews and an average rating of 6.70/10. The site's consensus says, "George A. Romero's latest entry in his much-vaunted Dead series is not as fresh as his genre-inventing original, Night of the Living Dead. But Land of the Dead does deliver on the gore and zombies-feasting-on-flesh action." On Metacritic, which assesses film with a score out of 100, the film holds a rating of 71 based on 30 reviews, indicating "generally favorable" reviews.

Roger Ebert gave the film three stars out of four for what he considered its skillful and creative allusions, something that he argued was pervasive among Romero's previous three installments, which contained numerous satirical metaphors to American life. Ebert noted this installment's distinction between the rich and poor, those that live in Fiddler's Green and those that live in the slums. John Lutz, in Zombies of the World, Unite: Class Struggle and Alienation in Land of the Dead, drew comparisons between the fireworks which were set off to distract the zombies in Land of the Dead to the US military 'shock and awe' displays seen in its military actions. Jeffrey Westhoff of Northwest Herald gave the film a rating of 3.5 stars out of four, saying, "The most shocking thing about Land of the Dead is not the vivid dismemberments but how boldly Romero holds a macabre mirror up to post-9/11 America." Michael Wilmington of Chicago Tribune awarded the film four stars, writing, "It's another hard-edged, funny, playfully perverse and violent exercise in movie fear and loathing, with an increasingly dark take on a world spinning out of control. By now, Romero has become a classicist who uses character and dialogue as much as stomach-turning special effects to achieve his shivers." The New York Sun declared it "the American movie of the year".

Several filmmakers, including John Landis, Eli Roth, Clive Barker, and Guillermo del Toro, paid tribute to Romero in a Land of the Dead special. Guillermo del Toro said: "Finally someone was smart enough to realize that it was about time, and gave George the tools. It should be a cause of celebration amongst all of us that Michelangelo has started another ceiling. It's really a momentous occasion..."

== Video game ==
A prequel, Land of the Dead: Road to Fiddler's Green, was released later that year.
