= Russell Streiner =

American film producer and actor (born 1940)

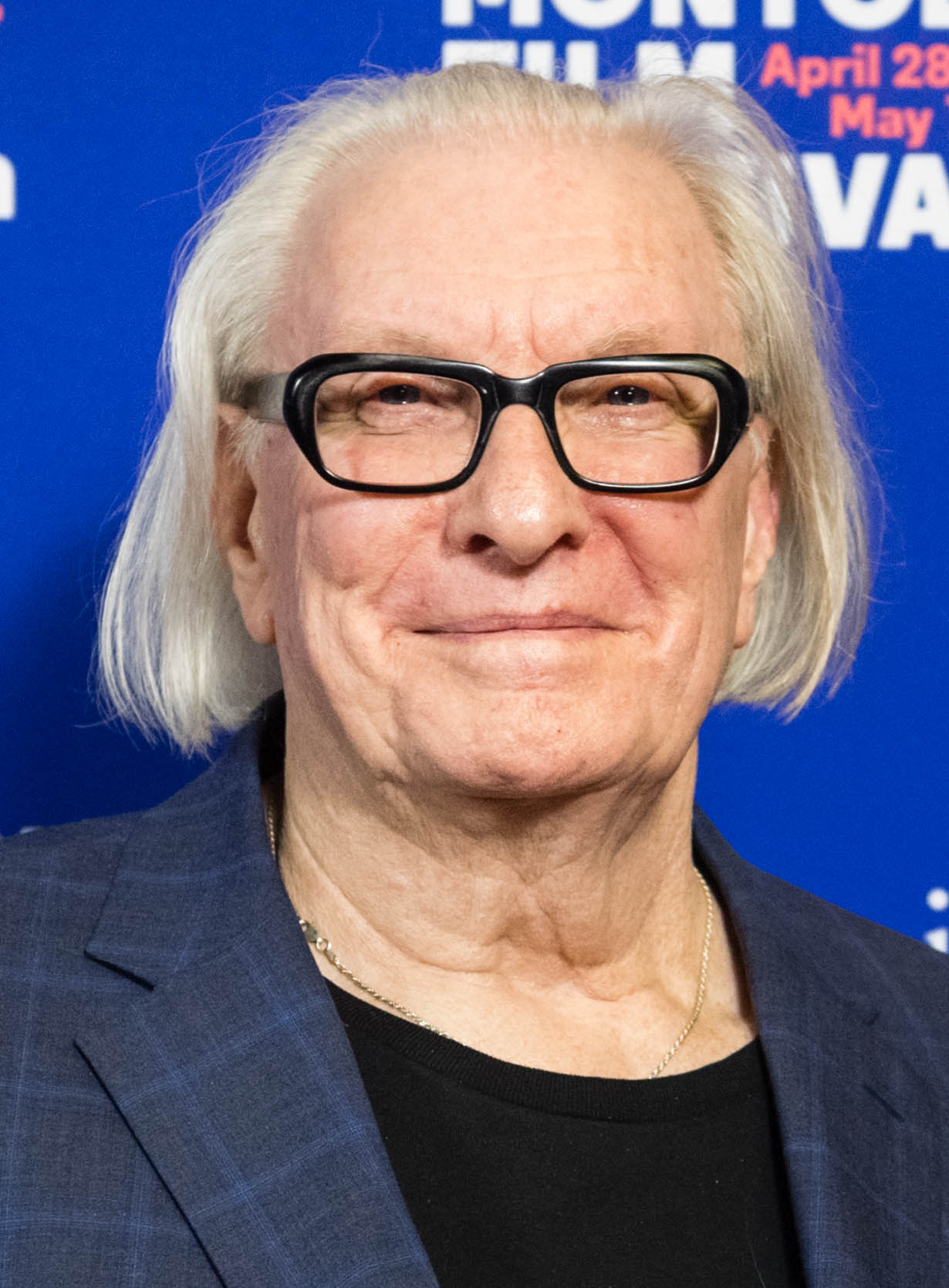
- Streiner in 2017
- Born: February 6, 1940 (age 86); Pittsburgh, Pennsylvania, U.S.
- Occupations: Actor; film producer
- Years active: 1968–present

Russell William Streiner (born February 6, 1940) is an American film producer and actor. He is the older brother of actor/producer Gary Streiner.

== Career ==
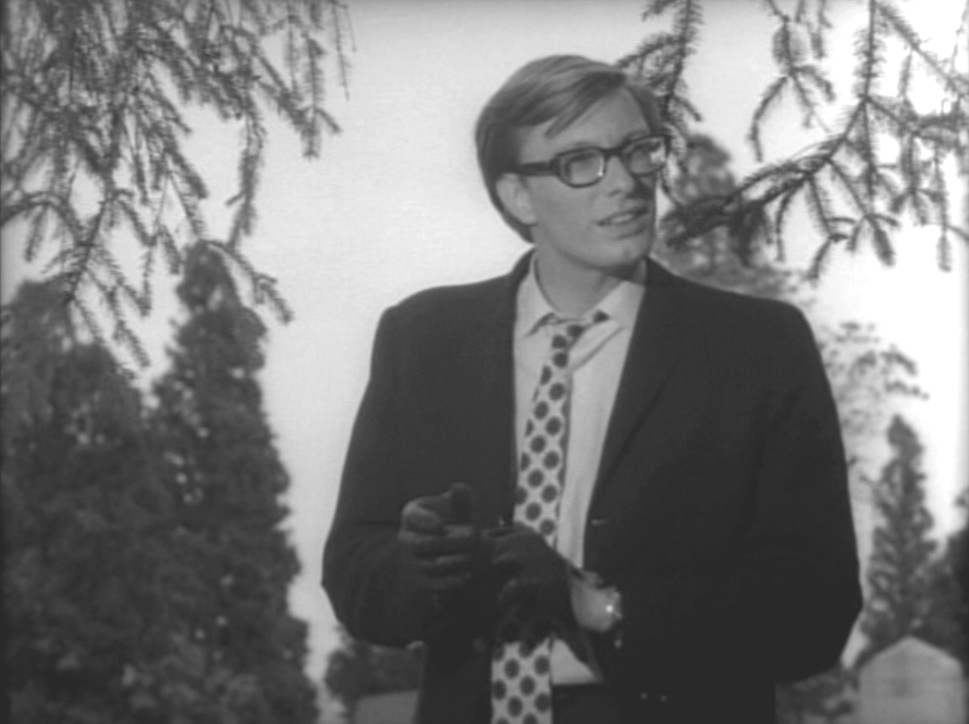
Streiner in Night of the Living Dead (1968)

Streiner is perhaps best known for his role as Johnny in Night of the Living Dead (1968). He was also one of the producers of the film. Streiner has also produced There's Always Vanilla (1971), The Booby Hatch (1976), and the remake of Night of the Living Dead (1990), in which he also has a cameo appearance as Sheriff McClelland. He worked in the advertising field for several years while continuing film, television, commercial, and corporate production work. Russell has been actively involved in bringing film and television productions to western Pennsylvania throughout his career, and currently serves as chairman on the board of directors of the Pittsburgh Film Office (formerly known as the Pittsburgh Film & Television Office). He also founded the Pittsburgh Film Office. Until 2014 Russ Streiner was also one of the co-mentors along with John A. Russo of the John Russo Movie Making Program at DuBois Business College in DuBois, Pennsylvania.

He also makes occasional appearances and signs autographs at horror conventions. Russell was married to Jackie Faust and actress Judith Ridley. Judith Ridley is an American actress best known for her appearances in Night of the Living Dead (1968) and There's Always Vanilla (1971). He is currently married to Ramona Streiner, an aspiring author and filmmaker. He continues to make his home in Pittsburgh and has two daughters, one son, one granddaughter, and one grandson.

== Filmography ==
=== As producer ===
- Night of the Living Dead (1968)
- There's Always Vanilla (1971)
- The Booby Hatch (1976)
- Night of the Living Dead (1990) (Executive Producer)
- One for the Fire: Night of the Living Dead 40th Anniversary Documentary (2008) (Associate Producer)

=== As actor ===
- Night of the Living Dead (1968) Johnny
- There's Always Vanilla (1971) TV Beer Commercial Director
- The Majorettes (1986) The Preacher
- Night of the Living Dead (1990) Sheriff McClelland
- My Uncle John Is A Zombie! (2016) Reverend Hotchkiss

=== As writer ===
- The Return of the Living Dead (1985) (Story)

=== Appearing as himself ===
- Drive-In Madness! (1987)
- Night of the Living Dead: 25th Anniversary Documentary (1993)
- The Dead Walk: Remaking a Classic (1999)
- UnConventional (2004)
- "Fear Files"
  - Episode: "Zombies" (2006)
- One for the Fire: Night of the Living Dead 40th Anniversary Documentary (2008)
