= The Majorettes =

- Directed by: Bill Hinzman
- Screenplay by: John A. Russo
- Based on: The Majorettes by John A. Russo
- Produced by: John A. Russo
- Starring: Kevin Kindlin; Terrie Godfrey; Denise Nickerson; Mark V. Jevicky; Thomas E. Desrocher
- Cinematography: Paul McCullough
- Edited by: S. William Hinzman; Paul McCullough
- Music by: Paul McCullough
- Production company: Major Films
- Distributed by: Manson International
- Release date: August 17, 1987 (U.S.)
- Running time: 93 minutes
- Country: United States
- Language: English
- Budget: $85,000

The Majorettes (released in the United Kingdom as One by One) is a 1986 American slasher film directed by S. William Hinzman, written and produced by John A. Russo, which he adapted from his own novel. Its plot follows a string of serial killings centered on the majorette squad of a small-town high school.

== Plot ==
A camouflage-clad serial killer has begun mysteriously killing the members of the school's majorette squad under the guise of "saving their souls" before they reach adulthood. Local Sheriff Braden and a federal agent investigate the killings. Pregnant teenager Nicole Hendricks is among the first victims, who is attacked and murdered alongside Tommy Harvack, a male acquaintance. Her body is found lying on the shore of a creek. Meanwhile, detective Roland Martell is carrying on an affair with teenaged Marie Morgan, a friend of Nicole.

Meanwhile, Vicky McAllister lives with her rich but invalid grandmother and her grandmother's housekeeper, Helga Schuler. Unknown to Vicky, Helga and her son Harry (a pervert who spies on Vicky and her fellow majorette friends in the shower and takes nude photos of them) poisoned her grandmother (rendering her paralyzed, mute, and utterly helpless) and murdered Vicky's parents years earlier. Helga has rewritten the grandmother's will to inherit everything if Vicky and her grandmother die, but a small catch can foil the entire plot: Due to an irrevocable clause in the original will that had to be left intact in the forged revised will, if Vicky dies before her 18th birthday, the grandmother's fortune will go to the state without an adult heir left alive to inherit.

After another majorette, Barbara, is found murdered in her swimming pool, Roland suspects that there is a significance to the fact that the victims are being found in water—he surmises it has a symbolic significance, akin to a baptismal purification ritual. Helga ultimately finds out the identity of the killer, Sheriff Braden, when Harry discovers him killing another victim, Judy, in the shower. She managed to remove his hood from his head prior to dying. The housekeeper and her son ambush Braden at his house, discovering he is a religious fanatic that is murdering the majorette squad before they turn 18 so that they will stay pure and not become sinful adults who have pre-marital sex or do drugs. They instruct the sheriff that he is to kill Vicky for the pair, but only after she turns 18 so they can steal the entire family fortune.

A local biker gang kidnaps Vicky and Jeff with the intent to rape and kill the former. In the midst of a violent outburst led by gang member Bart, she's shot and killed, as is Harry. Grief-stricken, her boyfriend, Jeff, accrues a large number of weapons and enacts a siege against the bikers' headquarters to avenge Vicky's death. Meanwhile, Braden secretly barges into Helga's home, hangs her, stages the scene as a self-suicide, and destroys photographic evidence proving him to be the killer. The Sheriff subsequently frames the deceased Harry for the murders, as he had a history of being a peeping tom.

Jeff survives, albeit sedated and in shock. Some time later, the sheriff watches from a distance as a coach trains a young group of elementary school girls to be majorettes.

== Cast ==
- Kevin Kindlin as Jeff Halloway
- Terrie Godfrey as Vicky McAllister
- Mark V. Jevicky as Sheriff Braden
- Sueanne Seamens as Judy Marino
- Denise Huot as Helga Schuler
- Carl Hetrick as Roland Martell
- Mary Jo Limpert as Marie Morgan
- Harold K. Keller as Harry Schuler
- Tom E. Desrocher as Mace Jackson
- Jacqueline Bowman as Nicole Hendricks
- Colin Martin as Tommy Harvack
- Russell Streiner as The Preacher

== Production ==
The Majorettes was filmed between October and November 1985, with principal photography occurring at Cornell High School in the Pittsburgh suburb of Coraopolis, with additional filming at the Fox Chapel Yacht Club. Its production budget was estimated at $85,000. The football coach was played by then head-coach of the Cornell Raiders, Wilbert Roncone (billed as "Wilbur Roncone").

== Release ==
The film was released theatrically in Europe in March 1987 under the title One by One, though as of February 1987, the film had not secured a theatrical distributor in the United States; at the time, Russo and Hinzman were in negotiation for a home video distribution deal with Vestron Video. Vestron released the film on VHS on August 17, 1988.

=== Critical response ===
Critic Jim Harper wrote of the film: "About halfway through... the film stops being a slasher movie and swings into action-thriller territory, with chase sequences explosions and gunfights. Not that it makes the film more interesting. The kills are mostly bloodless and the suspense non-existent. Bill Hinzman (the first zombie in Night of the Living Dead) handles the direction pretty well but the script is pretty dumb."

== Sources ==
- Harper, Jim (2004). Legacy of Blood: A Comprehensive Guide to Slasher Movies. Manchester: Critical Vision. ISBN 978-1-900-48639-2.
- Kane, Joe (2010). Night of the Living Dead: Behind the Scenes of the Most Terrifying Zombie Movie Ever. New York: Citadel Press. ISBN 978-0-806-53331-5.
- Tiech, John (2012). Pittsburgh Film History: On Set in the Steel City. Charleston, South Carolina: Arcadia Publishing. ISBN 978-1-6142-3589-7.
- Willis, Donald C. (1997). Horror and Science Fiction Films. Vol. IV. Lanham, Maryland: Scarecrow Press. ISBN 978-0-810-83055-4.
