= There's Always Vanilla =

1971 film by George A. Romero

- Poster art
- Directed by: George A. Romero
- Screenplay by: Rudolph J. Ricci
- Produced by: John A. Russo; Russell Streiner
- Starring: Raymond Laine; Judith Ridley; Roger McGovern
- Cinematography: George A. Romero
- Edited by: George A. Romero
- Music by: Steve Gorn; Jim Drake
- Production company: The Latent Image
- Distributed by: Cambist Films
- Release date: December 1971
- Running time: 93 minutes
- Language: English
- Budget: $70,000

There's Always Vanilla (also known as The Affair) is a 1971 romantic comedy film directed by George A. Romero and starring Raymond Laine, Judith Ridley, Roger McGovern, and Johanna Lawrence. It was Romero's second motion picture and his only romantic comedy.

It is one of the few Romero films that does not deal with a zombie apocalypse or supernatural horror themes. It was released on DVD from Something Weird Video and in the Anchor Bay Entertainment DVD release of Season of the Witch.

Romero described There's Always Vanilla as "a total mess" and considered it to be his worst film, citing its undercapitalization as a factor.

== Plot ==
Chris Bradley, a former U.S. Army soldier, has become a drifter and makes money by various means, from pimping to guitar playing. After working with a band in New York City, Chris returns to his home city of Pittsburgh and visits his father who owns and operates a baby food factory. After an evening out with his father of drinking at a local bar, and visiting an old girlfriend named Terri Terrific, Mr. Bradley wants Chris to abandon his bohemian lifestyle and do what was agreed upon when he separated from the military; return to the family business, but Chris refuses.

At a local train station, Chris meets Lynn, a beautiful young woman who works as a model and actress in local TV commercials. Chris charms his way into Lynn's life and moves in with her. At first their relationship is a pleasant escape from daily life, but when Lynn starts to resent supporting the freeloading Chris, she motivates him into getting a steady job. Lynn learns that she's pregnant and, knowing how irresponsible he is, decides to get an abortion without telling Chris.

Chris lands a job at a small advertising firm but when he's given an account to advertise enlistments for the U.S. Army, he quits out of his resentment of his military past. Meanwhile, Lynn cannot bring herself to have an abortion, she abandons Chris, and moves in with a high school boyfriend who agrees to marry her and raise the baby as his own.

His romance with Lynn ruined and his lifestyle destroyed, Chris swallows his pride and moves back in with his father, still unable to decide what to do with his life, but believing he ultimately must accept the old values like his father has. Chris has more encouragement after a talk at dinner at a Howard Johnson's with his father where he tells Chris that life is like an ice cream parlor, and that of all of life's most exotic flavors to choose from, there's always vanilla to fall back on.

The film's final scene shows a very pregnant Lynn living in a suburban house with her new husband. A large packaged box arrives at their house addressed to Lynn with Chris' home address on it. Upon opening the box on the front lawn of their house as instructed on the box, two helium-filled balloons float out of it and float away into the bright blue sky. On the bottom of the box is a note from Chris addressed to Lynn telling her to always remember the care-free time they had together.

== Cast ==
- Raymond Lain as Chris Bradley
- Judith Ridley as Lynn Harris (as Judith Streiner)
- Johanna Lawrence as Terri Terrific
- Richard Ricci as Michael Dorian
- Roger McGovern as Roger Bradley

== Critical reception ==
A review for The Austin Chronicle read, "It's a problematic movie; the script is actually fairly intelligent and literate, and the talent (unfamiliar from any of Romero's other films, except for Diane Russo from Night of the Living Dead) is believable, but the rambling narrative makes the intent of the story pretty unclear; it's as though the thrust of the writing is all towards character development and not towards a resolution of plot." Slant Magazine noted, "Alternately, there's the first rumblings of Romero's anti-capitalism that would reach its peak with Dawn of the Dead." Metacritic, which uses a weighted average, assigned the film a score of 48 out of 100, based on 4 critics, indicating "mixed or average" reviews.

== See also ==
- List of American films of 1971
