= Tom Savini =

American actor, stuntman, director and makeup artist

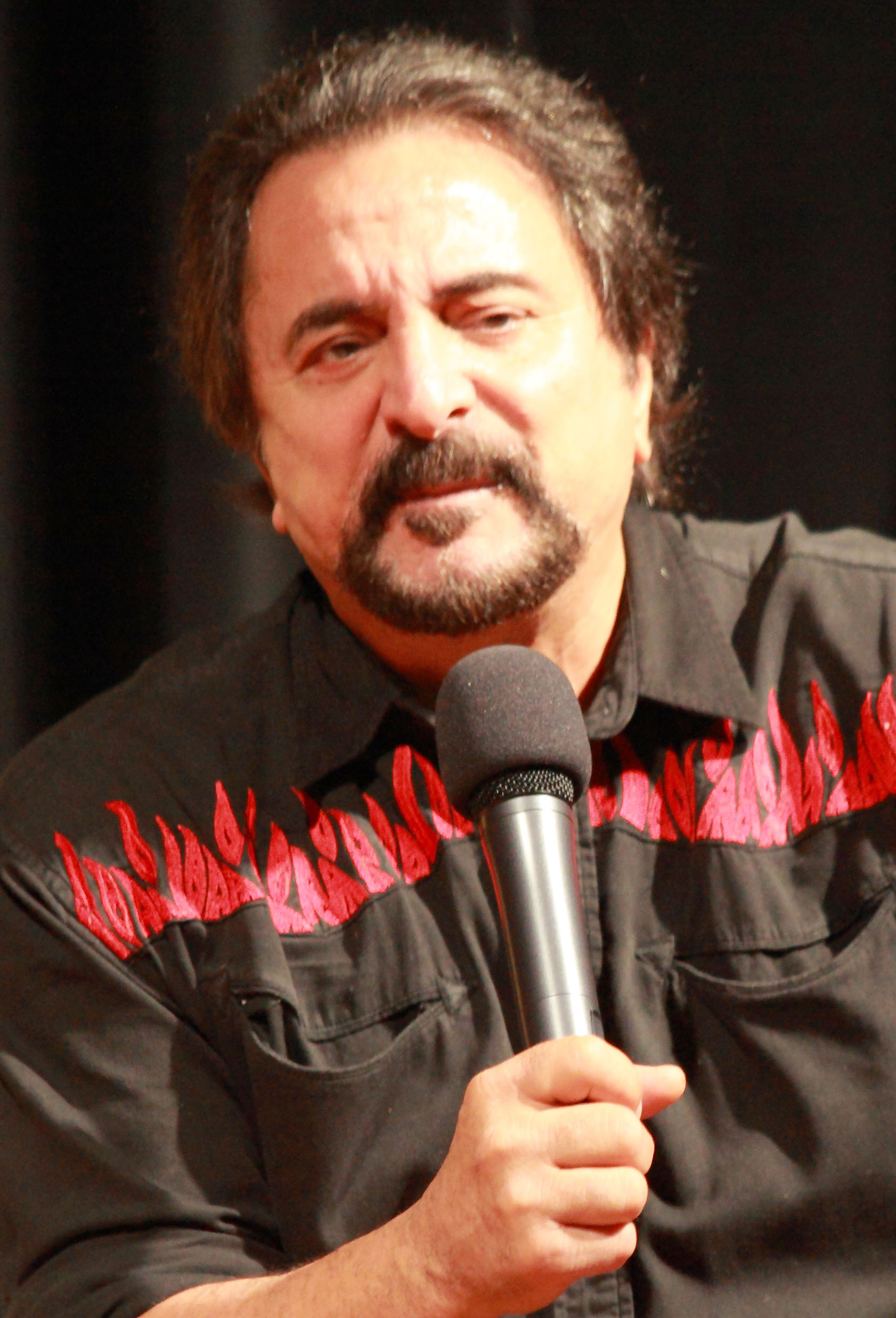
- Savini in 2014
- Born: Thomas Vincent Savini; November 3, 1946 (age 80); Pittsburgh, Pennsylvania, U.S.
- Occupations: Actor; prosthetic makeup artist; film director; stunt performer
- Years active: 1974–Present
- Children: 3
- Website: savini.com

Thomas Vincent Savini (born November 3, 1946) is an American prosthetic makeup artist, actor, stunt performer, and film director. He is best known for his makeup and special effects work on films directed by George A. Romero, including Martin (1977), Dawn of the Dead (1978), Creepshow (1982), Day of the Dead (1985), and Monkey Shines (1988). He also created the special effects and makeup for cult films such as Friday the 13th (Parts I and IV), Maniac (1980), The Burning, The Prowler (both 1981), and The Texas Chainsaw Massacre 2 (1986).

Savini directed Night of the Living Dead, the 1990 remake of Romero's 1968 film Night of the Living Dead. His other directing credits include three episodes of the television series Tales from the Darkside and a segment in The Theatre Bizarre.

As an actor and stunt performer, he has appeared in films such as Martin (1977), Dawn of the Dead (1978), Knightriders (1981), From Dusk till Dawn (1996), Planet Terror (2007), Machete (2010), Django Unchained (2012), and Machete Kills (2013).

Tom has a son and two daughters. In mid August 2026, he lost his home and 2 pets, both cats, in an electrical fire, alongside many of his work and props. He and his wife were reported as both surviving the fire. A $50,000 fundraiser was started to help in reconstruction and replacement efforts.

== Early life ==
Thomas Vincent Savini was born on November 3, 1946, in Pittsburgh, Pennsylvania, and is of Italian descent. He was raised Catholic and graduated from Central Catholic High School. As a boy, his inspiration was actor Lon Chaney: Savini attributes his earliest desires to create makeup effects to Chaney and the film Man of a Thousand Faces (1957).

Experimenting with whatever medium he could find, the young Savini practiced creating makeup effects on himself, later convincing his friends to let him practice his craft on them. He also discovered another passion: acting. Combining his makeup applications and homemade costumes, he especially enjoyed scaring his friends.

Savini practiced fencing and gymnastics. He is also accomplished with a bullwhip and can do motorcycle stunts. Many of his characters would be bikers or madmen who are hardened and eerily evil.

Savini attended Point Park University for three years before enlisting in the United States Army.

Savini served as a combat photographer during the Vietnam War. In a 2002 interview, he told the Pittsburgh Post-Gazette, "When I was in Vietnam, I was a combat photographer. My job was to shoot images of damage to machines and to people. Through my lens, I saw some hideous [stuff]. To cope with it, I guess I tried to think of it as special effects. Now, as an artist, I just think of creating the effect within the limitations we have to deal with." He continued to practice with makeup in Vietnam, often frightening locals by appearing to suddenly transform into a "monster".

Using the lens of his camera, Savini separated himself from the real-life horrors of war, although the images still haunted his mind. Savini said his wartime experiences influenced his eventual style of gory effects: "I hated that when I watched a war movie and someone dies. Some people die with one eye open and one eye half-closed, sometimes people die with smiles on their faces because the jaw is always slack. I incorporated the feeling of the stuff I saw in Vietnam into my work."

In 1969, while on guard duty on Cantho Airfield, a flare was triggered in the jungle area Savini was watching. Against military protocol, Savini fired into the bush without informing his superiors. Other soldiers likewise began firing until a duck wandered from the bush completely unharmed. Due to his failure to follow orders, Savini was taken off guard duty from his bunker on the following evening. That same evening, the bunker came under attack and several soldiers were wounded or killed. As a result of this incident, Savini earned the nickname "Duck Slayer" and to this day will not eat duck.

After his tour in Vietnam, he attended Carnegie Mellon University, as the first undergraduate to be awarded a full fellowship in the acting and directing program. He appeared in stage productions throughout college and continued on stage long after his tour of duty in Vietnam.

== Career ==
Savini is primarily known for his groundbreaking work in the special make-up effects known as prosthetic makeup. His signature style and techniques bring vivid realism to genre films.

Early in Savini's career, Dick Smith—known for his groundbreaking work in The Exorcist (1973)—became an inspiration and a guide, and later an associate at Savini's Special Make-up Effects Program.

Savini got his breakthrough working with Pittsburgh filmmaker George A. Romero, providing a convincing wrist-slashing effect in the opening scenes of Martin (1977). The following year, working with a larger budget on Dawn of the Dead, Savini created his signature palette of severed limbs and bite-marks. In the 1980 slasher film Friday the 13th, Savini expanded his repertoire of blood and gore. He continued to perfect those techniques in 1980's Maniac. and 1981's The Burning and The Prowler.

Savini earned the nickname "The Sultan of Splatter". In 1982, he created more traditional horror effects in Creepshow, a movie directed by Romero from a script written by Stephen King. In 1984, he agreed to work on Friday the 13th: The Final Chapter, where he killed his creation Jason Voorhees. Returning to the zombie genre in 1985, Savini won the year's Saturn Award for Best Makeup Effects for his work on the Romero's Day of the Dead. In 1986, Savini worked with director Tobe Hooper on the film The Texas Chainsaw Massacre 2. In 1998 he was the Media Guest of Honor for the World Horror Convention.

Savini has also worked on films by Italian director Dario Argento: 1990's Two Evil Eyes and 1993's Trauma. In the 1991 film Heartstopper, he created special effects for director John A. Russo. In 2011, he supervised the effects for the Australian film Redd Inc.

Savini has also acted in many of the same films he created effects for. His first appearance was a relatively straight, innocuous character in Martin in 1978. He then played Blades, a menacing biker, in Dawn of the Dead, a role he reprised in zombie form with a cameo appearance in the 2005 continuation of the series, Land of the Dead. In Maniac, he briefly appeared before facing the maniac's shotgun and having his head blown off in a spectacular display. Savini had a more prominent role as biker and antagonist Morgan, the Black Knight, in Romero's Knightriders (1981). Savini played the whip-wielding, vampire-fighting biker "Sex Machine" in the 1996 Quentin Tarantino/Robert Rodriguez film From Dusk till Dawn.

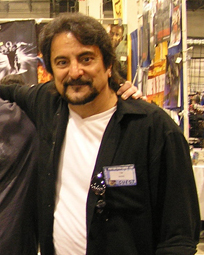
Tom Savini in 2007

In 2007, Savini had a role in Planet Terror, one of two stories in the Grindhouse film, directed by Robert Rodriguez. Savini plays Deputy Tolo, who fights to save his town from an infestation of zombie-like creatures. In another Rodriguez film, Machete, based on a fake movie trailer played during the film Grindhouse, Savini played Osiris Amanpour, hired to track and kill the protagonist Machete. Savini reprised his role in the sequel Machete Kills.

Cameos include roles as the vampire David Van Etten in Lost Boys: The Tribe; as the sheriff in the 2004 Dawn of the Dead remake; and the tongue-in-cheek Jesus Christ in Zombiegeddon (2003).

In 2006, Savini essayed the role of Prester John, the mythical villain in the dreamlike Sea of Dust. That year also saw the release of Johannes Roberts' Forest of the Damned, in which Savini played a mad hermit surrounded by angels cast from heaven. In 2008, he made a brief appearance in Zack & Miri Make a Porno as a thieving slumlord. He also appeared in The Dead Matter, along with Andrew Divoff and Jim O'Rear. Savini voiced himself on The Simpsons episode "Worst Episode Ever": While making an appearance at Android's Dungeon, Savini performs the "Gutbuster" gag, covering the crowd in "blood and guts" and consequently humiliating the Comic Book Guy. In 2012, Savini appeared as a shop teacher, Mr. Callahan, in the Pittsburgh-set teen drama The Perks of Being a Wallflower, starring Logan Lerman. Savini also appeared as one of the Trackers in Quentin Tarantino's Django Unchained. Future projects include Savini starring in the Nazi zombie film The 4th Reich directed by Shaun Robert Smith, playing the role of SS-Standartenführer Oskar Dirlewanger.

As a film director, Savini helmed episodes of the syndicated television series Tales from the Darkside, the 1990 color remake of Night of the Living Dead; and Housecall, the pilot of the proposed series The Chill Factor, which starred Pittsburgh actor Bingo O'Malley. In 2011, he directed "Wet Dreams", one of six segments to the horror film The Theatre Bizarre. In 2009, Savini announced his plan to direct a new film, Death Island, with special make-up effects by his former protege Greg Nicotero. On September 1, 2013, Savini began a crowdfunding project on Indiegogo for Death Island. His plans were to begin filming by the end of 2013.

In the 2008 novel Bad Moon Rising by Jonathan Maberry, Savini appears as one of the real-world horror celebrities who are in the fictional town of Pine Deep when monsters attack; other celebrities include James Gunn, Jim O'Rear, Brinke Stevens, Ken Foree, Stephen Susco, Debbie Rochon, Joe Bob Briggs and blues man Mem Shannon.

Savini also briefly took part in Jerry Lawler's 2010 revival of the Memphis Wrestling pro wrestling television show. His on-screen character sent horror-movie monsters (played by wrestlers from the Memphis area) onto the show to get revenge for Savini who blamed Lawler for the death of Savini's friend Andy Kaufman; the monsters' handler was manager "Hollywood" Jimmy Blaylock.

In 2012, American filmmaker Jason Baker published a biography of Savini entitled Smoke and Mirrors: The Story of Tom Savini.

He said during a Q&A with fans that the hardest movie he has ever worked on was Creepshow because it was "five movies in one".

In 2018, Savini announced via his Instagram that he would be directing a horror web series, in collaboration with others, including Tina Romero, Romero's daughter. Special effects for the web series were to be completed by Savini's students at Douglas Education Center.

In May 2019, Slipknot frontman Corey Taylor said in an interview that Savini worked to produce and create his new masks for the upcoming We Are Not Your Kind album and subsequent tour cycles. Around the same time, Savini was approached by wrestler Bray Wyatt to design the mask for his new "Fiend" character.

Savini also collaborated with David Bertolino, founder of the New England horror and Halloween theme park Spooky World in 1991, helping to design the attraction's stages and later haunted houses branded with Savini's name and a horror memorabilia museum.

== FX education ==
Savini runs the Tom Savini's Special Make-Up Effects Program at the Douglas Education Center in Monessen, Pennsylvania. Savini says he refers offers he receives for movie make-up effects projects to his students and graduates of his school.

Savini is the author of several books on special effects, including Grande Illusions I and II (1983, 1994), which detail the production and mechanical workings of many of his famous film effects. In Horror F/X, a 1989 direct-to-video interview conducted by frequent collaborator Russo, Savini explains many of his effects techniques, illustrated by film clips and behind-the-scenes video footage. He is also associated with other books in the horror genre including Book of the Dead and Horror 101 for which he wrote the foreword. Savini has also appeared in public demonstrating his effects, including appearances in the 1980s on Late Night With David Letterman in which he demonstrated such effects as "fire gel" and a gunshot to the head on Letterman himself.

== Filmography ==
=== As an actor ===
Films

| Year | Film | Role | Notes |
|---|---|---|---|
| 1978 | Martin | Arthur | First film with George A. Romero |
| 1978 | Dawn of the Dead | "Blades" | Second film with George A. Romero |
| 1978 | Effects | Nicky | |
| 1980 | Maniac | Disco Boy | |
| 1981 | Knightriders | Morgan | Third film with George A. Romero |
| 1982 | Creepshow | Garbage Man #2 | Fourth film with George A. Romero (cameo) |
| 1985 | The Ripper | Jack the Ripper | Direct-to-video; shot in and around Tulsa, Oklahoma |
| 1986 | Twisted Sister: Come Out and Play | Teacher | Cameo |
| 1987 | Creepshow 2 | The Creep | |
| 1990 | Two Evil Eyes | The Monomaniac (Uncredited) | Fifth film with George A. Romero |
| 1992 | Innocent Blood | News Photographer | |
| 1994 | Heartstopper | Lieutenant Ron Vargo | |
| 1995 | The Demolitionist | Roland | |
| 1996 | From Dusk till Dawn | "Sex Machine" | |
| 2001 | The Monster Man | Uncle Joe | |
| 2001 | Web of Darkness | Rouge | |
| 2001 | Children of the Living Dead | Deputy Hughs | |
| 2002 | Eyes Are Upon You | Eddie Rao | |
| 2002 | Ted Bundy | Salt Lake City Detective | |
| 2003 | Blood Bath | Stranger | |
| 2003 | Zombiegeddon | Jesus Christ | New York City Horror Film Festival Lifetime Achievement Award |
| 2004 | Vicious | Kane | |
| 2004 | Dawn of the Dead | County Sheriff Cahill | Remake of the 1978 film Dawn of the Dead |
| 2004 | Death 4 Told | Man | Cameo |
| 2004 | Unearthed | Victor Tonelli | |
| 2005 | Forest of the Damned | Stephen | |
| 2005 | Land of the Dead | Blades (Zombie) | Sixth film with George A. Romero |
| 2006 | A Dream of Colour in Black and White | Caddy | |
| 2006 | Beyond the Wall of Sleep | Sheriff | |
| 2006 | The Absence of Light | The Higher Power | |
| 2006 | Going to Pieces: The Rise and Fall of the Slasher Film | Himself | Documentary film |
| 2007 | Grindhouse | Deputy Tolo | Segment Planet Terror |
| 2007 | Loaded Dice | The Bishop | |
| 2008 | Silent Vengeance | Daniel Phillips | |
| 2008 | It's My Party and I'll Die If I Want To | Uncle Tom | |
| 2008 | Lost Boys: The Tribe | David Van Etten | Sequel to the 1987 film The Lost Boys |
| 2008 | Zack and Miri Make a Porno | Jenkins | |
| 2008 | Sea of Dust | Prester John | |
| 2009 | Eldorado | | |
| 2010 | The Dead Matter | Sebed | |
| 2010 | Machete | Osiris Amanpour | |
| 2010 | Horrorween | Killer | |
| 2012 | The Theatre Bizarre | Dr. Maurey | |
| 2012 | Django Unchained | Tracker Chaney | |
| 2012 | The Perks of Being a Wallflower | Mr. Callahan | |
| 2013 | Machete Kills | Osiris Amanpour | |
| 2013 | The 4th Reich | SS-Standartenführer Oskar Dirlewanger | |
| 2013 | Crystal Lake Memories: The Complete History of Friday the 13th | Himself - Special Make-Up Effects | Documentary film |
| 2015 | The Sadist | The Sadist | |
| 2020 | In Search of Darkness: Part II | Himself | Documentary film |
| 2024 | Terrifier 3 | Interviewee at Mall | |
| 2025 | Queens of the Dead | The Mayor | First film by Tina Romero |

Television

| Year | Film | Role | Notes |
|---|---|---|---|
| 1984 | The Boy Who Loved Trolls | Motorcyclist | Television film |
| 1996 | Mr. Stitch | Chemical Weapons Engineer | Television film |
| 2000 | Sheena | Peter Reynolds | Episode: "Lost Boy" |
| 2001 | The Simpsons | Himself | Episode: "Worst Episode Ever" |
| 2004 | The 100 Scariest Movie Moments | Himself | Television documentary, Part 1: 100-81 |
| 2009 | His Name Was Jason: 30 Years of Friday the 13th | Himself - Host | Television documentary |
| 2010 | Aqua Teen Hunger Force | Cop | Episode: "One Hundred" |
| 2016 | From Dusk till Dawn: The Series | Burt | 7 Episodes |
| 2020 | N0S4A2 | Old Snake | Episode: "The Night Road" |
| 2020 | Locke & Key | Locksmith | |

Video game

| Year | Video game | Role | Notes |
|---|---|---|---|
| 2013 | LocoCycle | Holt Ryebach | Live acting only |
| 2024 | Killer Klowns from Outer Space: The Game | Himself | DLC character |

=== As a make-up artist/special effects technician ===
==== Films ====
| Year | Film | Notes |
|---|---|---|
| 1974 | Deathdream | |
| 1974 | Deranged | |
| 1978 | Martin | |
| 1978 | Dawn of the Dead | Nominated: Saturn Award for Best Make-Up Effects |
| 1980 | Friday the 13th | |
| 1980 | Effects | |
| 1980 | Maniac | |
| 1981 | Eyes of a Stranger | |
| 1981 | The Burning | |
| 1981 | The Prowler | Savini sometimes cites The Prowler's gore and special effects as his all-time greatest work |
| 1981 | Knightriders | |
| 1982 | Xiao sheng pa pa | |
| 1982 | Creepshow | |
| 1982 | Alone in the Dark | |
| 1982 | Midnight | |
| 1984 | Friday the 13th: The Final Chapter | Jason Voorhees |
| 1984 | Maria's Lovers | |
| 1985 | Day of the Dead | Saturn Award for Best Make-Up Effects |
| 1986 | The Texas Chainsaw Massacre 2 | |
| 1987 | Creepshow 2 | |
| 1988 | Tales from the Darkside | Episode "Family Reunion" |
| 1988 | Monkey Shines | |
| 1988 | Red Scorpion | |
| 1990 | Two Evil Eyes | |
| 1991 | Heartstopper | |
| 1991 | Bloodsucking Pharaohs in Pittsburgh | |
| 1993 | Killing Zoe | |
| 1993 | Trauma | |
| 1993 | H.P. Lovecraft's: Necronomicon | |
| 1994 | Backstreet Justice | |
| 1995 | Ghostwriter | Episode "Attack of the Slime Monster" |
| 1996 | Mr. Stitch | Television film |
| 1997 | Cutting Moments | |
| 1999 | Cold Hearts | |
| 2001 | Web of Darkness | |
| 2002 | Ted Bundy | |
| 2011 | Death from Above | |
| 2012 | Redd Inc | |
| 2022 | The Black Phone | Savini designed the Grabber mask with Callosum Studios |
| TBD | Nightmare City | |

=== Video game ===
| Year | Video game | Notes |
|---|---|---|
| 2017 | Friday the 13th: The Game | Savini Jason design, when Savini was writing lore for Jason, wanted to have the idea be that Jason killed The Devil, stole his Pitchfork to come back into the mortal realm. |
| 2022 | Evil Dead: The Game | Savini Ash design |

=== As a director ===
| Year | Film | Notes |
|---|---|---|
| 1984–1988 | Tales from the Darkside | TV, three episodes |
| 1990 | Night of the Living Dead | Remake of the 1968 film |
| 2004 | Chill Factor: Housecall | |
| 2011 | The Theatre Bizarre | Segment "Wet Dreams" |
| 2019 | Creepshow | Episode 6. Segment "By the Silver Water of Lake Champlain" |
| TBD | Nightmare City | Remake of Nightmare City (1980) |

== Bibliography ==
- Grande Illusions: A Learn-By-Example Guide to the Art and Technique of Special Make-Up Effects from the Films of Tom Savini ISBN 0-911137-00-9
- Grande Illusions II ISBN 0-911137-07-6
- Bizarro! (A reissue of Grande Illusions, arbitrarily re-titled by its publisher) ISBN 0-517-55319-8
