= Empire of the Dead =

Comic book limited series

- Cover of the first issue

Publication information
- Publisher: Marvel Comics
- Schedule: Monthly
- Format: Limited series
- Genre: Horror
- Publication date: January 2014
- No. of issues: 15

Creative team
- Created by: George A. Romero
- Written by: George A. Romero
- Artist(s): Alex Maleev (Act One); Dalibor Talajic (Act Two); Andrea Mutti (Act Three)

Collected editions
- Empire of the Dead: Act One: ISBN 0785185178

Empire of the Dead, also known as George Romero's Empire of the Dead, is a limited series of comic books by Marvel Comics, that began publication in 2014.

It is written by George A. Romero, his second comic after "The Death of Death", a six-issue zombie action mini-series he wrote for the DC Comics anthology Toe Tags in 2004 and 2005. Empire features zombies similar to those in his Living Dead series of films. One way the series departs from his films is that vampires are also part of the story.

== Publication history ==
The series was announced in October 2013, as a 15-issue miniseries, split between three 5-issue acts. Act One launched in January 2014, with art by Alex Maleev, and ended in June 2014. Act Two, which featured art by Dalibor Talajic, began in September 2014 and ended in January 2015. The final act, Act Three, features art by Andrea Mutti and began in April 2015 and ended in August 2015.

== Collected editions ==
Title	Material collected	Released	Softcover ISBN
Empire of the Dead: Act One	Empire of the Dead: Act One #1-5	August 2014	978-0785185178
Empire of the Dead: Act Two	Empire of the Dead: Act Two #1-5	March 2015	978-0785185192
Empire of the Dead: Act Three	Empire of the Dead: Act Three #1-5	October 2015	978-0785185208

== TV series ==
In 2015, it was announced at Cannes that the production company Demarest was developing the comic series in to a TV series. The series was going to be written and executive produced by Romero and Peter Grunwald, with Sam Englebardt and William D. Johnson also executive producing. Nothing was ever created from the proposal.
