= Night of the Living Dead (1990 film) =

Horror film by Tom Savini

- Theatrical release poster
- Directed by: Tom Savini
- Screenplay by: George A. Romero
- Based on: Night of the Living Dead by: John Russo; George A. Romero
- Produced by: John A. Russo; Russell Streiner
- Starring: Tony Todd; Patricia Tallman
- Cinematography: Frank Prinzi
- Edited by: Tom Dubensky
- Music by: Paul McCollough
- Production companies: 21st Century Film Corporation; Menahem Golan Productions
- Distributed by: Columbia Pictures
- Release date: October 19, 1990
- Running time: 88 minutes
- Country: United States
- Language: English
- Budget: $4.2 million
- Box office: $5.8 million

Night of the Living Dead (Note: Sometimes credited as George A. Romero's Night of the Living Dead.) is a 1990 American supernatural horror film directed by Tom Savini in his feature directorial debut, and starring Tony Todd and Patricia Tallman. It is a remake of George A. Romero's 1968 film of the same title; Romero rewrote the original 1968 screenplay he had originally co-authored with John A. Russo. Like the original, the film follows seven strangers as they meet and survive in a rural farmhouse, following the awakening of zombies. It is the only official remake of the 1968 film, with other unofficial remakes following, as a result of the source material's lack of copyright ownership which resulted in it being in the public domain.

Romero began writing the screenplay for the film after Menahem Golan expressed interest in remaking the 1968 film with 21st Century Film Corporation producing. Russo served as a co-producer on the film alongside Russell Streiner. Savini was originally hired only to complete special effects on the project, but was persuaded to direct by Romero. Principal photography of Night of the Living Dead took place in Washington County, Pennsylvania in the spring of 1990.

Night of the Living Dead was released by Columbia Pictures in the United States on October 19, 1990. The film received mixed reviews from film critics upon initial release, with some finding it too close to the original film, while others felt it marked an improvement upon it. The film grossed $5.8 million against a $4.2 million budget. It went on to develop a cult following in the years since its release.

== Plot ==
On the idyllic afternoon of August 23, 1989, siblings Barbara and Johnny visit their mother's grave in a remote cemetery in Butler County, Pennsylvania. A terrified elderly funeral director with blood on his forehead bumps into them there, garbles an apology, and runs off. While offering to help him, they are attacked by a lone zombie. Johnny is killed while Barbara desperately flees to a seemingly abandoned farm house. As she tries to ward off a group of undead, Ben (who fled Evans City) arrives and helps Barbara dispatch them. The two quickly bond and clear the house, barricading the doors and windows as night falls.

They soon discover other survivors holed up in the cellar: Harry Cooper, his wife Helen, and their sick daughter Sarah who was bitten by a zombie, as well as teenaged lovers Tom Bitner and Judy Rose Larson. The group is divided over their next course of action: Harry insists on hunkering down in the cellar to wait for the authorities, while Ben believes that the cellar is a "death trap" and that they would be better off fortifying the house. Noticing the zombies' limited mobility, Barbara suggests that they leave on foot. Hostile tensions flare between Ben and Harry, leaving the Coopers to stay in the basement while the others continue reinforcing the house. The loud construction attracts a large swarm to the farmhouse, surrounding it and leaving the ragtag group trapped with nowhere to go.

They devise a plan to escape by refueling Ben's near-empty truck at a locked gas pump nearby. They find a rifle upstairs and a set of keys on Uncle Rege's corpse (the farm's owner) and proceed to drive up the hill toward the gas pump. However, their plan begins to unravel when Ben falls from the bed of the truck and is left to defend himself. To Tom's horror, the key set does not include one for the gas pump. Realizing they're out of time, he tries shooting the lock off. This causes gasoline to spray and ignite a torch; the truck and gas pump explode, killing both Tom and Judy.

Ben returns to the house to find it in chaos: Harry has disarmed Barbara, and the horde has torn past the barricades. Unbeknownst to the survivors upstairs, Sarah has succumbed to her bite, attacking and killing her distraught mother before triggering a shootout between Harry, trying to protect her, and Ben and Barbara, protecting themselves. Ben and Harry are badly wounded, and Barbara successfully shoots Sarah. Harry retreats upstairs to the attic, while Ben staggers down to the cellar, shooting a reanimated Helen. Before going into shock, he discovers that the gas pump key had been in the cellar the entire time. He laughs mindlessly at the irony before dying.

Meanwhile, Barbara escapes the farm house alone and attempts to find help, eventually joining some countryside locals who are clearing the area, and wakes up the next day in a makeshift camp surrounded by the safety of the media and townspeople, led by Sheriff McClelland. Noticing hillbillies drunkenly antagonizing some captured zombies, she comments on the similarities between them, suggesting that the living are little better than the dead. She returns to the farmhouse to find a zombified Ben, who gets put down by the posse. When Harry emerges from the attic alive, an enraged Barbara swiftly kills him in retribution for causing Ben's death and leaves the house, telling the vigilantes they have "another one for the fire." She watches stoically as the bodies are burned on a pyre outside.

== Cast ==
- Tony Todd as Ben
- Patricia Tallman as Barbara Todd
- Tom Towles as Harry Cooper
- McKee Anderson as Helen Cooper
- William Butler as Tom Bitner
- Katie Finneran as Judy Rose Larson
- Bill Moseley as Johnny Todd
- Heather Mazur as Sarah Cooper
- Russell Streiner as Sheriff McClelland (uncredited). Streiner played Johnny in the original film.
- Bud Koffler as Zombie Hunter
- Greg Funk as Cemetery Zombie
- Pat Logan as Uncle Rege
- Albert Shellhammer as Cousin Satchel
- Bill "Chilly Billy" Cardille as Himself, reprising his role from the original film, in a cameo appearance as the TV news reporter.

== Production ==
=== Development ===
Night of the Living Dead (1968) director and co-writer George A. Romero said that the remake came about in part because of issues over profits of the original film. A lengthy court battle over the rights to the film, plus an oversight that caused the copyright notice not to be included, caused Romero to see little in the way of profit. Romero's production company, Image Ten, eventually won the lawsuit, but the distributor went out of business before they could collect any money. Another issue was that the filmmakers were worried that someone else might make an unauthorized remake. Romero contacted Menahem Golan when he heard that 21st Century Film Corporation was interested in a remake, and Romero, John A. Russo, and Russell Streiner collaborated for the first time in 20 years. Tom Savini was initially hired to perform the special effects, but was persuaded to direct by Romero. Savini was drawn to the remake because he was unavailable to do special effects on the original.

In November 1989, it was announced that Savini was opening a production office for the film in the Pittsburgh, Pennsylvania area, and would begin hiring later that month. Pre-production for Night of the Living Dead began on February 20, 1990, with a reported schedule of eight weeks. A regional casting call for extras was held beginning March 24, 1990, headquartered in the Upper Buffalo Presbyterian Church in Washington County, Pennsylvania.

=== Filming ===
Principal photography of Night of the Living Dead took place in Hopewell Township, Pennsylvania in the spring of 1990, beginning on April 23, on a budget of $4.2 million.

The production was not easy for Savini, who described it as "the worst nightmare of my life." Savini said that only forty percent of his ideas made it into the final film. Without Romero on set, he clashed with the producers, who did not allow him to explore his vision for the film.

=== Special effects ===
The special effects team intentionally kept the effects restrained, as they felt that excessive gore would be disrespectful to the original film. To keep the effects realistic, they used as inspiration a real autopsy, forensic pathology textbooks, and Nazi death camp footage. Savini said that he wanted to keep the film artistic despite his reputation as "the king of splatter". The zombie extras were recruited easily, as the film's reputation drew them from as far away as Kentucky.

== Release ==
To avoid an X rating, Savini had to cut several scenes from the film. Savini attributed the film's lack of popularity among horror fans to these cuts. Night of the Living Dead premiered in the United States on October 19, 1990.

=== Home media ===
Columbia TriStar Home Entertainment released the film on DVD in 1999.

A Blu-ray version was released in a limited edition of 3,000 on October 9, 2012, by Twilight Time. This edition received criticism from reviewers for its color processing, which, though approved by Savini, was significantly darkened and incorporated a blue tint to the picture. Australian film distributor Umbrella Entertainment released a special edition of the film featuring a restored print, alongside the 1968 original on Blu-ray on April 6, 2016. On October 23, 2018, Sony Pictures Home Entertainment released a Blu-ray edition in North America.

In late 2024, Savini commented that a forthcoming release of an uncut version of the film was planned for home media release by Sony in celebration of the film's 35th anniversary. On July 3, 2025, the 35th anniversary 4K UHD Blu-ray was formally announced, and released on September 23, 2025.

== Reception ==
=== Box office ===
Night of the Living Dead earned $3.6 million at the U.S. box office during its opening weekend, though the ticket sales "plummeted 65%" the following weekend. The film grossed a total of $5.8 million.

=== Critical response ===
==== Contemporary ====
The initial response and critical consensus among both audience members and critics was generally mixed.

Owen Gleiberman of Entertainment Weekly rated it D+ and wrote, "In the history of bad ideas, George Romero's decision to produce a color remake of his disturbingly frenzied 1968 zombiefest Night of the Living Dead has to rank right up there with New Coke...The original Night was taken by some to be a statement about the Vietnam War; this one isn't about anything larger than Romero's desire to make a buck." Writing for the Chicago Sun-Times, Roger Ebert awarded the film one star out of a possible four, writing, "The remake is so close to the original that there is no reason to see both".

Caryn James of The New York Times gave the film a mixed assessment, noting: "There was no real need to remake a film that lives on the campy cult appeal it has acquired over time. But as B-movies and remakes go, this one knows how to bring tired zombies back to life." Kevin Thomas of the Los Angeles Times wrote, "While this Night hasn't the chilling, almost cinema-verite credibility of the original, it is certainly a well-sustained entertainment". In The Washington Post, Richard Harrington criticized the film as a purely financial effort that lacks the shock of the original film now that zombie film tropes have become clichéd. Variety called it "a crass bit of cinematic grave-robbing".

Dave Kehr of the Chicago Tribune rated the film three out of four stars and wrote that although Savini's direction is a bit too literal, the film "contains some intriguing further development of the ideas of the first film, as well as some mistakes corrected and dramatic relationships tightened." The Oregonian's Ted Mahar found the film effective and praised it, describing it as an "equal of the original in most ways and superior in others."

==== Modern assessment ====
Night of the Living Dead went on to develop a cult following in the years since its original release. On the review aggregator website Rotten Tomatoes, 58% of 97 critics' reviews are positive. The website's consensus reads: "Night of the Living Dead fails to bring much new to the original's narrative tentpoles, but its sleek action and amplified gore make it a worthwhile horror showcase." Metacritic, which uses a weighted average, assigned the film a score of 54 out of 100, based on 100 critics, indicating "mixed or average" reviews.

Bloody Disgusting rated it four-and-a-half out of five stars and wrote, "This film works on so many levels. Normally, remakes are horrible, and diverge so much from the original film. This one is so close to the original it's scary." Reviewing the Twilight Time Blu-ray, Adam Tyner of DVD Talk rated it 3.5/5 stars and wrote, "We'll never get a chance to see the remake that Tom Savini set out to direct. Still, despite the many missteps of this severely compromised version, Night of the Living Dead manages to distinguish itself as one of the more effective horror remakes out there." Reviewing the same disc at DVD Verdict, Patrick Naugle rated it 83 out of 100 and called it "one of the superior zombies movies available". In a retrospective at PopMatters, academic Cynthia Freeland compared the racial politics of the original film and the gender politics of the remake. Freeland concludes that the original film's depiction of Barbara makes for better cinema, and the more feminist-friendly update of Barbara is too derivative of standard "final girl" tropes.

Savini often screens an uncut work print VHS copy of the film at conventions. According to Savini, "Years later I was at a midnight showing and did a Q&A before the movie, and I wasn't going to sit down and watch it, but I did...And it was the first time that I saw it objectively, and it's good!"

== See also ==
- Dawn of the Dead: The 2004 remake of George A. Romero's 1978 film of the same name.

== Sources ==
- Joshi, S. T. (2006). Icons of Horror and the Supernatural: An Encyclopedia of Our Worst Nightmares. Westport, Connecticut: Greenwood Press. ISBN 978-0-313-08100-2.
- Kane, Joe (2010). Night of the Living Dead: Behind the Scenes of the Most Terrifying Zombie Movie Ever. Citadel Press. ISBN 978-0-8065-3331-5.
- Smith, Phil (2015). Footbook of Zombie Walking. Axminster, England: Triarchy Press. ISBN 978-1-911-19319-7.
