= George A. Romero =

American filmmaker (1940–2017)

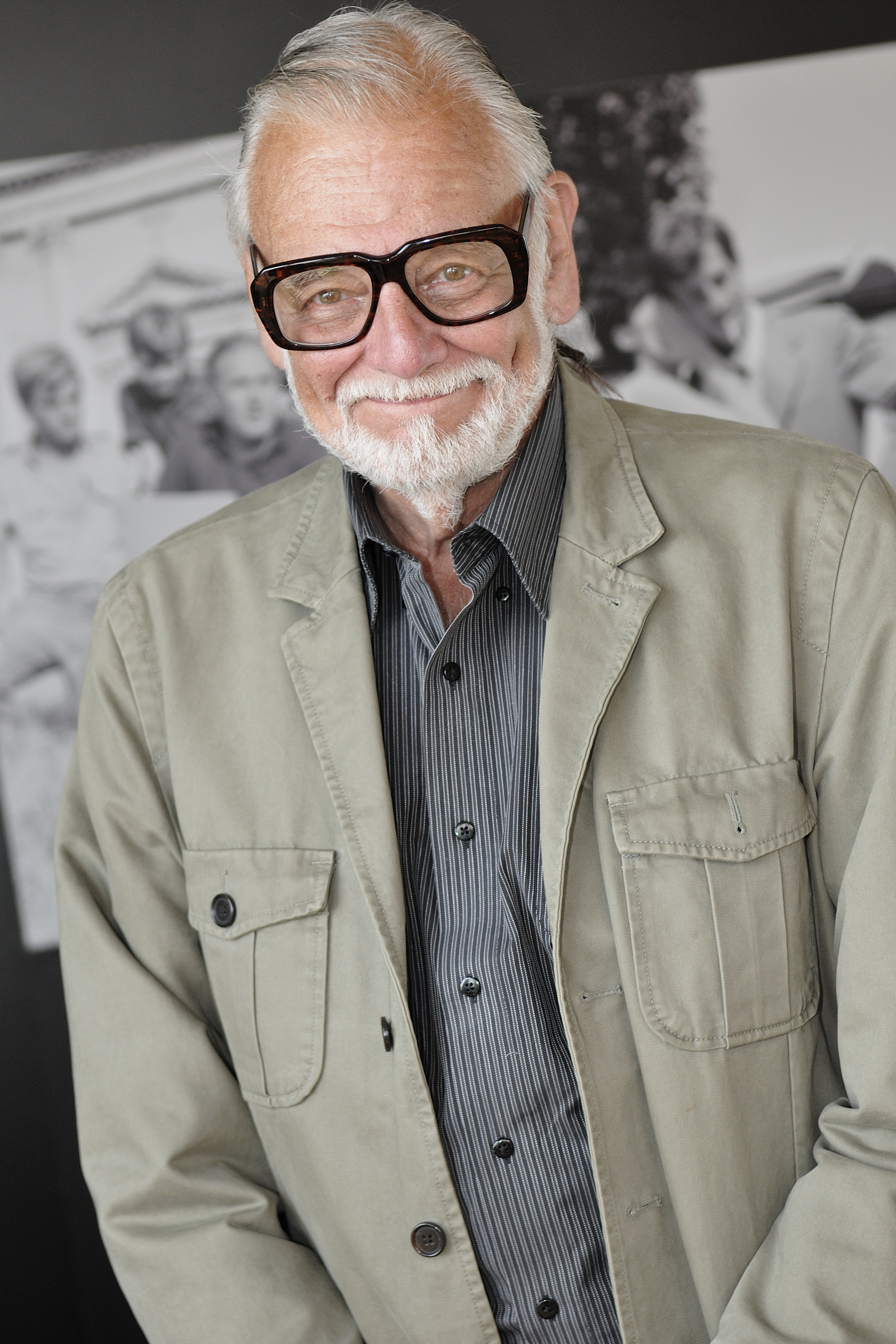
- Romero in 2009
- Born: George Andrew Romero; February 4, 1940; New York City, U.S.
- Died: July 16, 2017 (aged 77); Toronto, Ontario, Canada
- Burial place: Toronto Necropolis
- Citizenship: United States; Canada (from 2009)
- Education: Carnegie Mellon University (BFA)
- Occupations: Film director; screenwriter; editor; actor
- Years active: 1960–2017
- Known for: Films based on an imagined zombie apocalypse
- Spouses: Nancy Romero (m. 1971; div. 1978); Christine Forrest (m. 1981; div. 2010); Suzanne Desrocher (m. 2011)
- Children: 3
- Website: officialgeorgeromero.com

George Andrew Romero (/rəˈmɛəroʊ/; February 4, 1940 – July 16, 2017) was an American and Canadian filmmaker, writer, editor, and actor. Regarded as an influential pioneer of the horror film genre, particularly zombie films, he has been described as an "icon" and the "father of the zombie film".

The first three films in his Night of the Living Dead series—Night of the Living Dead (1968), Dawn of the Dead (1978) and Day of the Dead (1985)—are widely regarded as among the best and most influential horror films ever made, and were major contributors to the modern cultural image of the zombie.

Noted for his frequent social commentary, Romero had a prolific career outside of zombie films, although still largely within the horror genre. The Crazies (1973), The Amusement Park (1975), Martin (1977), Creepshow (1982), and Monkey Shines (1988) are regarded as minor cult works, as is his anthology television series Tales from the Darkside (1983–1988). His ventures outside horror include the feminist drama film Season of the Witch (1972) and the action film Knightriders (1981), while his final three films—Land of the Dead (2005), Diary of the Dead (2007), and Survival of the Dead (2009)—form the second half of his Night of the Living Dead franchise.

== Early life ==
Romero was born on February 4, 1940, in the New York City borough of the Bronx, the son of Anne Romero (née Dvorsky) and George M. Romero, a commercial artist. His mother was Lithuanian, and his father was a Spanish-born Cuban, having emigrated to Cuba as a child. His father has been reported as being born in A Coruña, with his family coming from the Galician town of Neda, although Romero once described his father as of Castilian descent.

Raised in the Parkchester section of the Bronx, he would frequently ride the subway into Manhattan to rent film reels to view at his house. He was one of only two people who repeatedly rented the opera-based film The Tales of Hoffmann; the other was future director Martin Scorsese. Romero attended Carnegie Mellon University in Pittsburgh.

== Career ==
=== 1960s ===
Night of the Living Dead (full film)

In 1960, after graduating from college in Pittsburgh, Romero, with a $20,000 loan from his uncle, and Rudy Ricci and Russ Streiner, they incorporated The Latent Image, to produce commercials. They produced commercials for Iron City Beer, Duke Beer, U.S. Steel, Calgon, and Heinz Ketchup, and New York Film Festival winning industrial shorts. Romero directed the "Picture, Picture" and "Mr. Rogers Gets a Tonsillectomy" (1968) segments for "Mr. Roger's Neighborhood."

In the late 1960s, with nine friends, including screenwriter John A. Russo, Russ Streiner, and Karl Hardman, Romero formed Image Ten Productions. This is the production company that produced Night of the Living Dead (1968). Directed by Romero and co-written with John A. Russo, the film became a cult classic and a defining moment for modern horror cinema.

Among the inspiration for Romero's filmmaking, as told to Robert K. Elder in an interview for The Film That Changed My Life, was the British film The Tales of Hoffmann (1951), from the Powell and Pressburger team.

It was the filmmaking, the fantasy, the fact that it was a fantasy and it had a few frightening, sort of bizarre things in it. It was everything. It was really a movie for me, and it gave me an early appreciation for the power of visual media—the fact that you could experiment with it. He was doing all his tricks in-camera, and they were sort of obvious. That made me feel that, gee, maybe I could figure this medium out. It was transparent, but it worked.

=== 1970s and 1980s ===
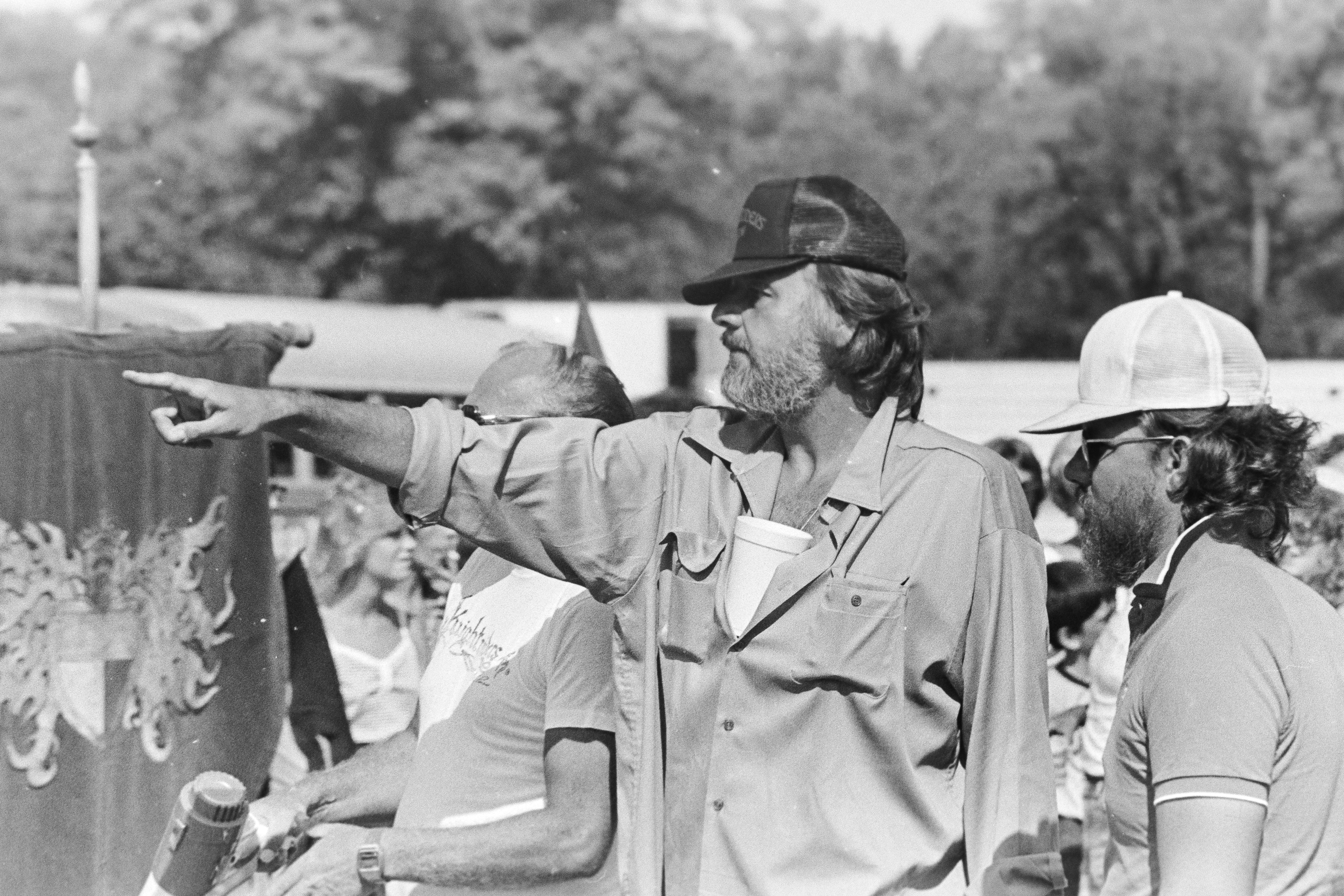
Romero (center) on the set of Knightriders, 1981

The three films that Romero created that followed Night of the Living Dead — There's Always Vanilla (1971), Jack's Wife / Season of the Witch (1972) and The Crazies (1973) — were not as well received as Night of the Living Dead or some of his later work. The Crazies, dealing with a biohazard accident that incites an epidemic of homicidal madness, and the critically acclaimed arthouse success Martin (1978), a film that deals with the vampire myth, were the two well-known films from this period.

Romero continued to do work outside of theatrical cinema. In 1974, he directed O. J. Simpson: Juice on the Loose, a TV documentary about O. J. Simpson's then-active football career. In 1975, Romero was commissioned by the Lutheran Service Society of Western Pennsylvania to direct The Amusement Park, an educational film about elder abuse. It was little-seen at the time of its 1977 debut and was for many years considered to be a lost film. A rediscovered print was re-released in 2021, at which time it met with critical acclaim.

Romero returned to the zombie genre in 1978 with Dawn of the Dead. Shot on a budget of $640,000, the film earned $55 million worldwide and was later named one of the top cult films by Entertainment Weekly in 2003.

Romero shot Knightriders (1981), about a group of modern-day jousters who reenact tournaments on motorcycles, and Creepshow (1982), written by Stephen King, an anthology of horror tales modeled after 1950s horror comics. The cult-classic success of Creepshow led to the creation of Romero's Tales from the Darkside, a horror anthology television series that aired from 1983 to 1988. Romero also drafted "Pinfall", a screenplay for Creepshow 2 based on a draft by Stephen King ("Pinfall" was ultimately never filmed). He made the third entry in his Dead series with Day of the Dead in 1985. As the decade drew to a close, Romero directed Monkey Shines (1988), about a service animal.

=== 1990s ===
Romero updated his original screenplay and executive-produced the 1990 remake of Night of the Living Dead directed by Tom Savini for Columbia/TriStar. Savini is responsible for the makeup and special effects in many of Romero's films including Dawn of the Dead, Day of the Dead, Creepshow, and Monkey Shines.

The early 1990s featured the directorial efforts Two Evil Eyes (1990), an Edgar Allan Poe adaptation in collaboration with Dario Argento, and The Dark Half (1993), from a novel written by Stephen King. In 1991, he made a cameo appearance in Jonathan Demme's The Silence of the Lambs (1991) as one of Hannibal Lecter's jailers.

In 1994, Romero shot a short film, Jacaranda Joe, about people running into a community of Bigfoot. Filmed at Valencia College in Florida, it was the first film that Romero shot entirely outside of Pittsburgh.

In 1998, Romero produced and directed an unaired pilot about professional wrestling entitled Iron City Asskickers. It was released on DVD and VHS in 2021.

In 1998, he directed a live-action commercial promoting the video game Resident Evil 2 in Los Angeles. The 30-second advertisement featured the game's two main characters, Leon S. Kennedy (portrayed by actor Brad Renfro) and Claire Redfield (Adrienne Frantz), fighting a horde of zombies while in Raccoon City's police station. The project was familiar territory for Romero and the Resident Evil series has been heavily influenced by the Dead series. The commercial was popular and was shown in the weeks before the game's actual release, although a contract dispute prevented it from being shown outside Japan. Capcom was so impressed with Romero's work that it was strongly indicated that he would direct the first Resident Evil film. He declined at first — "I don't wanna make another film with zombies in it, and I couldn't make a movie based on something that ain't mine" — although in later years, he reconsidered and wrote a script for the first movie. It was eventually rejected in favor of Paul W. S. Anderson's version.

In the mid 1990s, he wrote a script for a film adaptation of the first original Goosebumps book Welcome to Dead House. It was eventually rejected altogether, although Romero's screenplay is kept archived by The University of Pittsburgh.

=== 2000s ===
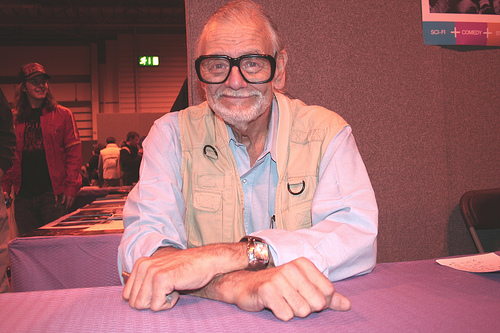
Romero attending a horror convention, 2005

2000 saw the release of Bruiser, about a man whose face becomes a blank mask. In 2004, Universal Studios produced and released a remake of Dawn of the Dead, with which Romero was not involved. Later that year, Romero kicked off the DC Comics title Toe Tags with a six-issue miniseries titled The Death of Death. Based on an unused script that Romero had written for his Dead series, the comic miniseries concerns Damien, an intelligent zombie who remembers his former life, struggling to find his identity as he battles armies of both the living and the dead. Typical of a Romero zombie tale, the miniseries includes ample supply of both gore and social commentary (dealing particularly here with corporate greed and terrorism — ideas he explored in his next film in the series, Land of the Dead). Romero has stated that the miniseries is set in the same kind of world as his Dead films, but featured other locales besides Pittsburgh, where the majority of his films take place.

Romero directed Land of the Dead, released in 2005. The film's working title was Dead Reckoning. Actors Simon Baker, Dennis Hopper, Asia Argento, and John Leguizamo starred and the film was released by Universal Pictures (who released the Dawn of the Dead remake the year before). The film received generally positive reviews.

Romero collaborated with the game company Hip Interactive to create a game called City of the Dead, but the project was canceled midway due to the company's financial problems.

In August 2006, The Hollywood Reporter announced that Romero signed on to write and direct George A. Romero's Diary of the Dead, which follows a group of college students filming a horror movie who proceed to film the events that follow when the dead rise.

After a limited theatrical release, Diary of the Dead was released on DVD by Dimension Extreme on May 20, 2008, and later on Blu-ray on October 21, 2008. Shooting began in Toronto in September 2008 on Romero's Survival of the Dead (2009). The film was initially reported to be a direct sequel to Diary of the Dead, but the film features only Alan van Sprang, who appeared briefly as a rogue National Guard officer, reprising his role from the previous film, and did not retain the first-person camerawork of Diary of the Dead. The film centers on two feuding families taking very different approaches in dealing with the living dead on a small coastal island. The film premiered at the 2009 Toronto International Film Festival. Prior to the US theatrical release of May 28, 2010, Survival of the Dead was made available to video on demand and was aired as a special one-night showing on HDNet on May 26, 2010.

Some critics have seen social commentary in much of Romero's work. They view Night of the Living Dead as a film made in reaction to the turbulent 1960s, Dawn of the Dead as a satire on consumerism, Day of the Dead as a study of the conflict between science and the military, Land of the Dead as an examination of class conflict, Diary of the Dead as a film made in reaction to the "emerging media" and Survival of the Dead as a study on war and conflict.

=== 2010s ===
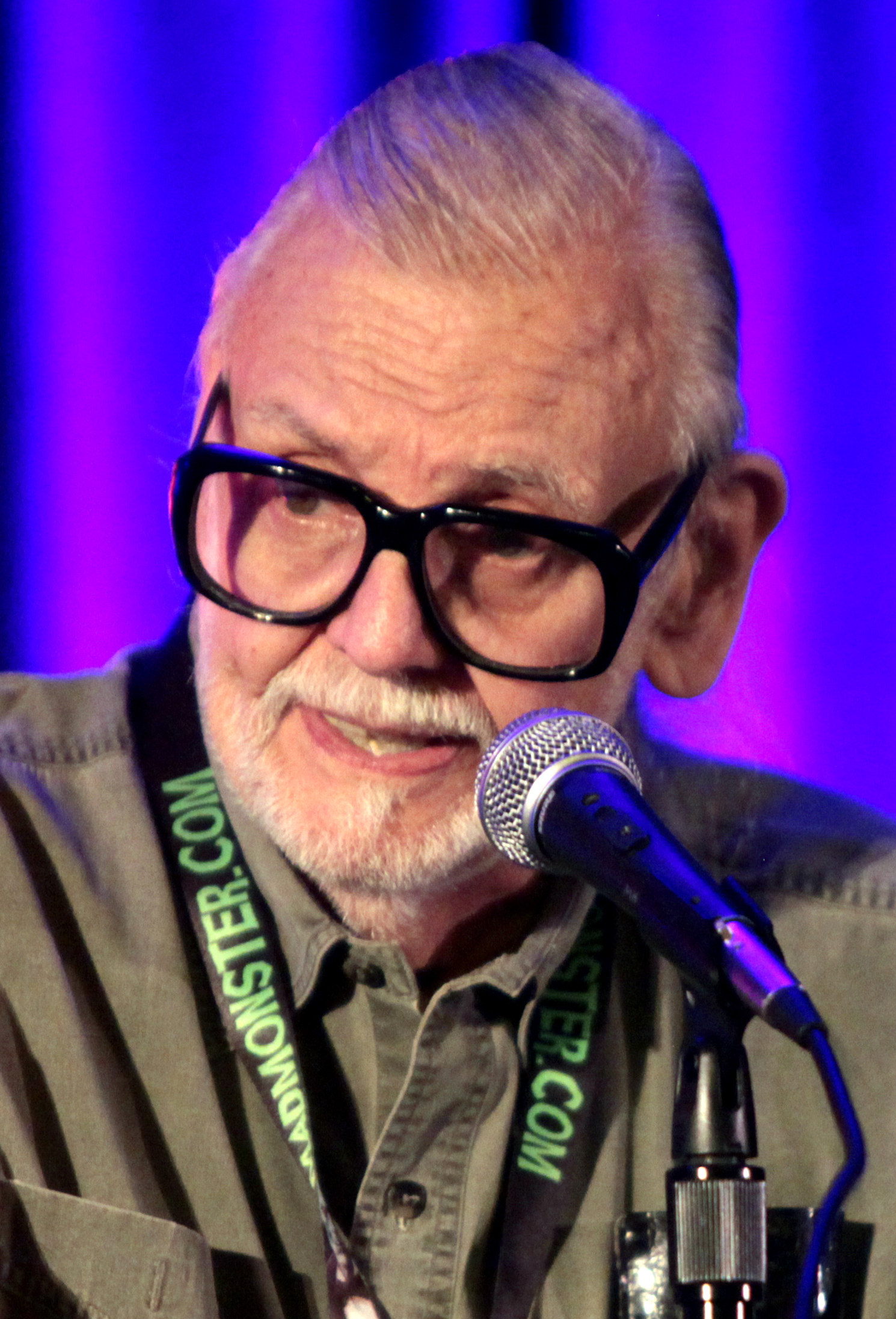
Romero in 2016

In 2010, Romero stated that he had plans for two more Dead films which would be connected to Diary of the Dead and they would be made depending on how successful Survival of the Dead was. Romero, however, said that his next project would not involve zombies and he was going for the scare factor, but offered no further details.

Romero made an appearance in the second downloadable map pack called "Escalation" for the video game Call of Duty: Black Ops. He appears as himself in the zombies map "Call of the Dead" as a non-playable enemy character. Romero is featured alongside actors Sarah Michelle Gellar, Danny Trejo, Michael Rooker, and Robert Englund, all of the four being playable characters. He is portrayed as a powerful "boss" zombie armed with a movie studio light.

In 2012, Romero returned to video games recording his voice for Zombie Squash as the lead villain, Dr. B. E. Vil. Zombie Squash was released by ACW Games for the iPad in November 2012.

In 2014, Marvel Comics began releasing Empire of the Dead, a 15-issue miniseries written by Romero. The series is broken up into three acts, five issues each, and features zombies and vampires.

A prequel comic book series based on Romero's unproduced zombie film idea Road of the Dead was announced by IDW in July 2018. The 3-part mini-series was released in December 2018.

In April 2021, it was announced that Romero's unproduced film treatment for Twilight of the Dead was put back into development under the supervision of Suzanne Romero, with co-writer Paolo Zelati finishing the script. Suzanne told The Hollywood Reporter, "This is the film he wanted to make. And while someone else will carry the torch as the director, it is very much a George A. Romero film." In August 2023, the film was announced to start production in fall 2023, once the current SAG-AFTRA strike comes to an end. A month later, it was announced that the film would be directed by Brad Anderson.

== Personal life ==
Romero was married three times. He married his first wife, Nancy, in 1971. They divorced in 1978. They had one child together, Cameron, who later became a filmmaker.

Romero met his second wife, actress Christine Forrest, on the set of Season of the Witch (1972), and they married in 1981. Together they had two children, Tina and Andrew. Tina Romero is a filmmaker who made her directorial debut with the horror-comedy Queens of the Dead (2025).

Romero met Suzanne Desrocher while filming Land of the Dead (2005), and they married in September 2011 at Martha's Vineyard and lived in Toronto. He acquired Canadian citizenship in 2009, becoming a dual Canada-U.S. citizen. Desrocher-Romero would die of natural causes on June 24, 2026.

== Death ==
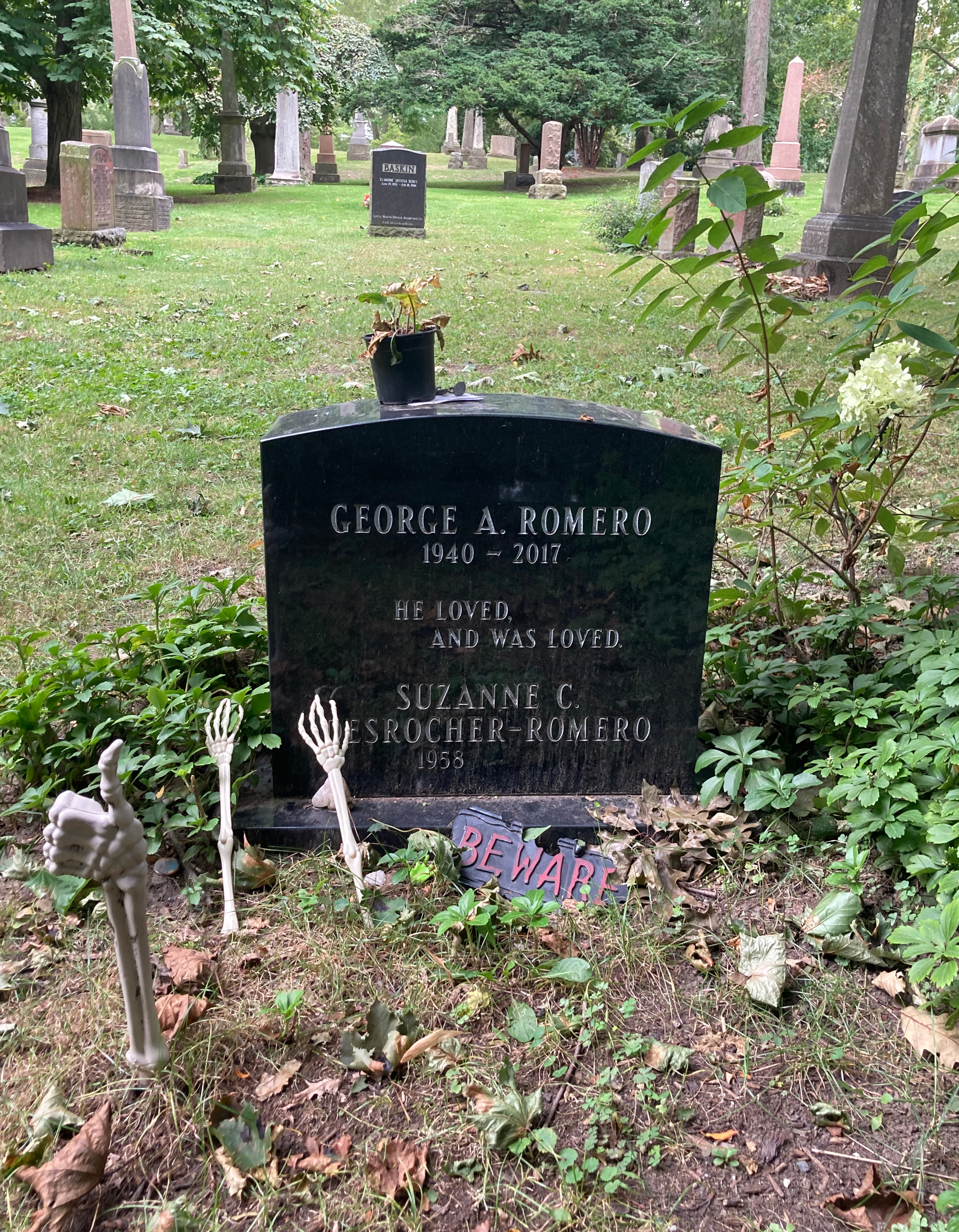
Romero's grave at Toronto Necropolis, decorated with skeletal hands and a "Beware" sign

On July 16, 2017, Romero died from a "brief but aggressive battle with lung cancer", according to a statement by his longtime producing partner, Peter Grunwald. Romero's third wife, Suzanne Desrocher Romero, said that he had been a heavy smoker, but managed to quit the habit for at least seven years before his death. He died while listening to the score of one of his favorite films, The Quiet Man (1952), with Desrocher Romero and his daughter from his second marriage, Tina, by his side. He was 77. He was buried at Toronto Necropolis.

== Influences ==
Romero ranked his top ten films of all time for the 2002 Sight & Sound Greatest Films Poll. They are The Brothers Karamazov, Casablanca, Dr. Strangelove, High Noon, King Solomon's Mines, North by Northwest (a film on which a teenaged Romero worked as a gofer), The Quiet Man, Repulsion, Touch of Evil and The Tales of Hoffmann. Romero listed the films in alphabetical order, with special placement given to Michael Powell's The Tales of Hoffmann, which he cites as "my favorite film of all time, the movie that made me want to make movies."

== Awards and nominations ==
On October 27, 2009, Romero was honored with the Mastermind Award at Spike TV's Scream 2009. The tribute was presented by longtime Romero fan Quentin Tarantino, who stated in his speech that the "A" in George A. Romero stood for "A Fucking Genius."

He was presented the Bram Stoker Award for Lifetime Achievement in 2015. In 2016, he was honored with the Ted M. Larson Award at the Fargo Film Festival for his contribution to cinema.

== Legacy ==
Regarded as the "Godfather of the Dead", as well as the "Father of the Modern Movie Zombie", critic Owen Gleiberman said of Romero that he was "a maestro of zombie terror who created the ultimate horror-movie metaphor" and remarked that "the real metaphor isn't only about Vietnam, or capitalism, or even disease, or anything else that you can stuff into a fortune cookie. It's about something more basic but ethereal, something that you can sense without putting it into words: the hidden aggression we all feel deep down, as the price of too much civilization."

In 2010, writer and actor Mark Gatiss interviewed Romero for his BBC documentary series A History of Horror, in which he appears in the third episode. Los Angeles Times. Romero's influence, and that of Night of the Living Dead, is widely seen among numerous filmmakers and artists, in particular those who have worked in the zombie subgenre, including comics writer Robert Kirkman, novelist Seth Grahame-Smith, and filmmakers John Carpenter, Edgar Wright and Jack Thomas Smith.

The season eight premiere episode "Mercy" of the zombie-based show The Walking Dead, the first to air after Romero's death, dedicated the episode to Romero; showrunner Scott M. Gimple said that the show "owes a great debt" to Romero for his impact on popular culture.

In May 2019, the University of Pittsburgh announced it had acquired George Romero's archives and that a multimedia exhibit be created and open to the public in the university's Hillman Library.

=== The George A. Romero Foundation ===
The George A. Romero Foundation is a nonprofit organization dedicated to preserving and promoting Romero's legacy. Founded in 2018 by Romero's wife Suzanne Desrocher-Romero, the Foundation's mission is to advance the causes for which George Romero was a champion – creativity within the horror genre and independent filmmaking in general – as well as preserving and documenting the history of the genre in all forms and contributing to its future by encouraging new generations of filmmakers, artists, and creators.

== Bibliography ==
1. Dawn of the Dead (with Susanna Sparrow; movie tie-in), 1979.
2. Martin (with Susanna Sparrow; movie tie-in), 1984.
3. Toe Tags #1-6 ("The Death of Death"; DC Comics), 2004–2005.
4. Empire of the Dead (Marvel Comics), 2014–2015.
5. Nights of the Living Dead co-edited by Jonathan Maberry and George Romero (St. Martin's Griffin), 2017.
6. The Living Dead (with Daniel Kraus), 2020.
7. Pay the Piper (with Daniel Kraus), 2024.

=== Forewords written by Romero ===
1. Bizarro! by Tom Savini (foreword), 1984. ISBN 0517553198
2. Book of the Dead edited by John Skipp and Craig Spector (foreword), 1989.
3. ZOMBIES! An Illustrated History of the Undead Foreword by George A. Romero.
4. The Extraordinary Adventures of Dog Mendonça and Pizzaboy II – Apocalipse by Filipe Melo and Juan Cavia (foreword), 2011.

== Filmography ==
Directed features

- Night of the Living Dead (1968)
- There's Always Vanilla (1971)
- Season of the Witch (1972)
- The Crazies (1973)
- The Amusement Park (1975)
- Martin (1977)
- Dawn of the Dead (1978)
- Knightriders (1981)
- Creepshow (1982)
- Day of the Dead (1985)
- Monkey Shines (1988)
- The Dark Half (1993)
- Bruiser (2000)
- Land of the Dead (2005)
- Diary of the Dead (2007)
- Survival of the Dead (2009)

== See also ==
- George A. Romero's unrealized projects
