= DuBois Business College =

Coordinates: 41.12451°N 78.75468°W

The DuBois Business College (DBC) was a private business college in DuBois, Pennsylvania. It opened in 1885 and closed in 2016 after its accreditor had its authority revoked by the U.S. Department of Education. The college offered many Associate in Specialized Business Degrees (associate's degree) and diploma programs. It was licensed by the State Board of Private Licensed Schools, Pennsylvania Department of Education and accredited by the Accrediting Council for Independent Colleges and Schools (ACICS). DBC additionally had locations in Huntingdon, Philipsburg, and Oil City.
