= List of My Babysitter's a Vampire episodes =

The following is a list of episodes for the Fresh TV Original Series, My Babysitter's a Vampire. It premiered on Télétoon (French), on February 28, 2008 and Teletoon on August 11, 2007, both as sneak peeks. It premiered on Cartoon Network on August 11, 2007, and later It premiered on Disney Channel on September 11, 2007. The series is a supernatural drama, and is a follow-up to the film of the same name.

== Series overview ==
Season	Episodes	Originally released	
Season	Episodes	First released	Last released
Film		April 11, 2007 (Teletoon); April 16, 2007 (Télétoon); April 11, 2007 (Cartoon Network) (absent)	
1	13	August 11, 2007 (Teletoon); February 28, 2008 (Télétoon); Augus 11, 2007 (Cartoon Network)	April 5, 2008 (Teletoon/Télétoon); October 19, 2007 (Cartoon Network)
2	13	September 6, 2008 (Teletoon); October 28, 2008 (Télétoon); June 29, 2008 (Cartoon Network)	December 6, 2008 (Teletoon); April 11, 2009 (Télétoon); October 5, 2008 (Cartoon Network)

== Film ==
Title	Directed by	Written by	Teletoon / Télétoon air date	Disney Channel release date	U.S. viewers (millions)
My Babysitter's a Vampire	Bruce McDonald	Story by : Tim Burns, Tom McGillis & Jennifer Pertsch; Teleplay by : Tim Burns	April 11, 2007 (replace) October 9, 2010 / April 16, 2007 (replace) October 16, 2010	April 11, 2007 (replace) October 09, 2010	4.18

== Episodes ==
=== Season 1 (2007) ===
No. overall	No. in season	Title	Directed by	Written by	Cartoon Network release date and Disney Channel release date	Teletoon / Télétoon release date	Prod. code	U.S. viewers (millions)
1	1	"Lawn of the Dead"	Bruce McDonald	Tim Burns	August 11, 2007	August 11, 2007 / February 28, 2008	101	N/A
Benny wants to impress a girl named Della (Rebecca Dalton), so when he finds out that her dog Puffles died, he decides to win her over by bringing Puffles back to life. He steals a potion from his grandmother to resurrect the dog. Shortly after Benny uses the potion, things start to go horribly wrong. Not only has the revival of Puffles made the dog completely evil due to its soul moving on, but Benny poured too many drops of the potion into the ground, causing it to spread and unleash other animals from the grave. When Ethan's father has a dinner party, demon animals arrive all around the house and Sarah, Benny and Ethan must kill them all before Ethan's parents catch them.
2	2	"Three Cheers for Evil"	Bruce McDonald	Alice Prodanou	August 11, 2007	August 11, 2007 / March 1, 2008	102	3.27
When Ethan has a nasty vision where Erica has captured the souls of White Chapel High's students, he and Benny disguise themselves as cheerleaders to protect the souls of the student body. Stephanie (Leah Cudmore), the head cheerleader, puts a worship spell on both Erica and Sarah. She teaches a new routine for the pep rally that turns out to actually a spell that will help Stephanie, who is revealed to be a witch, maintain her immortality. She is the one who captures the souls, not Erica, as Ethan had thought. On the day of the pep rally, Ethan and Benny break the spell, unmasking Stephanie's real age. Benny's grandma removes Stephanie's powers and a now-aged Stephanie ends up as a lunch lady.
3	3	"Blood Drive"	Paul Fox	Ken Cuperus	August 20, 2007	January 19, 2009	105	N/A
White Chapel High hosts a blood drive and Erica comes in as an intern, planning to take the donated blood for herself. After she finds out that the nurses have a truck full of blood, she recruits Rory to sneak into the truck and steal it. Ethan has a vision and realizes the nurses are vampires. Erica and Rory get caught by the vampire nurses, who trap them inside the truck. Ethan and Sarah battle the nurses; one of the nurses smells Ethan's blood and tells him that his blood is H-deficient; extremely rare. Ethan then proposes a trade; he will give a pint of his blood to the nurses if they free Rory and Erica. The trade is accepted and Erica and Rory are released. Amy Lalonde guest stars as Older Nurse.
4	4	"Guys and Dolls"	Paul Fox	Ken Cuperus	August 31, 2007	February 9, 2009	107	1.13
Jane steals Benny's spellbook after her doll, Debby Dazzle (Georgina Reilly), becomes broken. She attempts to fix Debby with a spell, but Debby becomes human instead. Ethan, Benny and Sarah realize she is dangerous when Ethan has a vision, telling him that Debby sucks life energy from humans in order to maintain her human form. Debby sucks the entire life energy out of Ethan's parents, turning them into dolls. The next day, Debby has a fight with Erica, and her skin tears. She turns Erica into a doll and goes to find Jane, believing Jane can fix her. At home, Ethan dresses up as Debby's male counterpart to distract her and just as Debby starts choking him, Jane recites the reverse spell, finally turning Debby back into a doll.
5	5	"Double Negative"	Tibor Takacs	Mike Kiss	September 11, 2007	February 23, 2009	108	N/A
The yearbook team is coming up with ideas for yearbook photos and decide to use an old camera that Benny sold them. Unbeknownst to Benny, the camera is bewitched; it creates an evil clone of whoever's photo is taken with it. Ethan has a vision and realizes what happened. Benny takes a photo of himself with the camera and his evil clone is created. Once Ethan and Benny realize that Benny has an evil twin, they turn to Benny's grandma for help, who explains that the camera brings out the negative side of one's soul. To destroy the clones, they must destroy the photo negatives. Ethan and Benny manage to destroy the negatives and all the clones that were created from the camera vanish.
6	6	"Friday Night Frights"	Bruce McDonald	Ben Joseph	September 11, 2007	September 11, 2007 / March 2, 2008	103	N/A
Whitechapel High hasn't won a sports trophy in 30 years so the ghost of Coach Ed (Clé Bennett), White Chapel High's deceased former gym coach, returns to finally win one. The tough-as-nails specter has a deal for Ethan: win the wrestling competition, or be haunted forever. At first, Ethan refuses, but Coach Ed then shows him a future where Ethan still lives with his parents and Kurt married Sarah. Ethan goes against rival wrestler Kurt "The Hurt" Lochner (William Greenblatt), and ends up winning the match by tickling Kurt. Despite Ethan winning, Coach Ed calls off the deal. Just then, all the spirits of the nerds he tormented arrive and suck him into the underworld, destroying him forever.
7	7	"Smells Like Trouble"	Tibor Takacs	Grant Suave	September 17, 2007	March 22, 2009	109	N/A
When Ethan has trouble trying to ask Sarah on a date, Benny makes a love potion that makes both Erica and Sarah fall in love with them. However, when Benny accidentally drops the potion, the potion's scent drifts, affecting every girl in school. Benny's grandmother finds out about it and explains that because of nature's balance, all the girls who had loved them will hate them even more. As per her word, the girls arrive with weapons, crazed to kill them. Ethan and Benny lock themselves in the "Eternity Cage", a prop Ethan had ordered from a movie, to keep themselves safe and wait until the potion wears off; they end up spending the night in the cage. After the curse wears off Sarah and Erica, the ups truck arrives and delivers the key to the cage. The girls refuse to let the boys out until they have revenge. Ethan and Benny end up doing chores for Grandma, Sarah, and Erica. Note: Dusk is a parody of the Twilight series.
8	8	"Die Pod"	Tibor Takacs	Scott Oleszkowicz	October 1, 2007	October 1, 2007 / March 15, 2009	110	N/A
White Chapel's oldest tree has been cut down, and the tree takes its revenge by growing weeds into the school's computer system. When Ethan finds disgusting plant matter sizzling inside Sarah's laptop, he and Benny investigate and discover the truth. The tree had been the site of druid rituals and has its own spirit. Rory becomes possessed by the tree while trying to download a music video, and Ethan, Benny, and Sarah must stop it without hurting Rory. Ethan has an idea: to hack all the computers in the lab with a virus. He acts upon his idea and all the computers shut down. The tree is destroyed and Rory is saved.
9	9	"Blue Moon"	Paul Fox	Simon Racioppa & Richard Elliott	October 14, 2007	October 14, 2007 / March 3, 2008	104	N/A
Ethan suspects that the school's hairiest jock, David Stachowski (Jake Epstein) is a werewolf and while trying to prove this fact, he is accidentally hit with a misfired werewolf spell from Benny. Ethan has a vision of David trying to find a cure for himself during the full moon, which confirms his suspicion. However, when Sarah finds out about this cure, she hopes she can use it for herself to become human again. On the night of the full moon, Benny's misfired spell makes Ethan transform into a werewolf. Sarah finds the cure, a drinking potion, and ends up using it all on a werewolf trying to kill Benny, whom she thinks is David. However, when the werewolf is cured, it turns out to be Ethan himself. David isn't a werewolf; he only transforms into a shaggy dog under the full moon. It is unknown if David's true form is human or dog.
10	10	"Doug the Vampire Hunter"	Paul Fox	Mike Kiss	October 19, 2007	January 26, 2009	106	N/A
Ethan, Benny and Rory win a chance to help Doug Falconhawk (Thomas Mitchell), a paranormal investigator, with an episode of his TV show. Ethan tries to keep Sarah and Rory away from Doug so he doesn't suspect that they are vampires. However, when Doug's special camera detects Sarah's vampirism, Doug tries to hunt her down. Sarah, now worried for her life, flees. Ethan and Benny create a plan to show Doug that Sarah being a vampire was all a hoax. Doug then leaves with his show canceled, revealing that his last name is not Falconhawk and his awesome hair is just a wig, crushing Benny and Ethan. They later see Doug on TV again, introducing his new prank show in replacement of his canceled one.
11	11	"The Brewed"	Tibor Takacs	Tim Burns & Graham Seater	October 27, 2007	March 1, 2009	111	N/A
A delivery error causes a coffee to turn its drinkers into zombies. The principal of White Chapel High has a whole case delivered for the teachers and all the teachers turn into zombies. Sarah, Ethan and Benny split up to find a cure. Benny is bitten but remains normal long enough to escape to the chemistry lab with Ethan. After inspecting the coffee's molecules, Ethan determines that the zombies are averse to cold temperatures. They decide to blast the air conditioning to subdue the zombies. In the A/C control room, Sarah is attacked by a zombified Rory. She slams him against the A/C switch, causing the A/C to turn on. The zombies become normal again. Absent: Kate Todd as Erica
12	12	"Three Geeks and a Demon"	Brian Roberts	Jennifer Pertsch	October 28, 2007	March 29, 2009	112	3.08
On the night Sarah is to babysit Jane with Ethan and Benny, Rory accidentally ruins the cable, leaving the 5 of them bored. They find a board game that allows its players to talk to spirits. Sarah decides not to play and goes upstairs with Jane. Ethan reads the rules of the game, and he, Benny and Rory talk to a friendly spirit. After dismissing it, Rory plays alone and breaks the rules of the game, causing a demon spirit to unleash. The demon possesses Sarah and wreaks havoc in the house. The boys dig up the Cubile Animus and successfully suck the demon out of Sarah, just before Ethan's parents come home. However, all is not well when, unknown to the boys, a hand pokes out from the spot where they dug up the box, implying that Jesse has awakened from his grave. Absent: Kate Todd as Erica
13	13	"ReVamped" "Jesse’s Girl"	Brian Roberts	Alice Prodanou	October 31, 2007	April 5, 2009	113	N/A
In the first-season finale, Jesse (Joe Dinicol) returns from the grave and puts Erica in a trance (by escaping out of the Cubile Animus when Ethan and Benny dug it out last episode) to get Sarah back but she refuses, and Ethan and Benny prepare to destroy him again. On the night of their high school dance, Jesse bites Ethan, forcing Sarah to choose between saving Ethan from immortality and becoming a full vampire herself, or letting him become a fledgling like herself. She chooses Ethan, just as he is in the process of becoming a fledgling, by sucking the venom out of his blood, transforming her into a full vampire, the one thing she was dreading. Back home, Benny's grandma tells an injured Ethan that he is still fully human; Ethan feels terrible about what Sarah had to do for him. Outside, Erica tells Sarah that now they're literally "Best friends forever now". Sarah finally accepts what she is and moves on as she flies away to the after-party with Erica and Rory. Jessie is not seen again until the season two finale, The Date To End All Dates.

=== Season 2 (2008) ===
Vanessa Morgan confirmed via Twitter that there will be a second and final season. It was later confirmed and that it consisted of 13 episodes. Season 2 began filming on January 21, 2008 and wrapped up on March 15, 2008. Season 2 was produced by Byron A. Martin who also acted as 2nd Unit Director on numerous episodes. Cartoon Network announced they would pick it up again for a second season.

The second and final season first premiered in the United States on Cartoon Network on June 29, 2008, initially airing on Tuedays at 8:30PM ET (7:30PM Central) before moving back to 7:30PM ET (6:30PM Central). Season two premiered in Canada on Teletoon on Saturdays, September 6, 2008 at 7:30PM ET (6:30PM Central), three episodes later the series moved up to 8:00PM ET (7:00PM Central).

No. overall	No. in season	Title	Directed by	Written by	Cartoon Network release date and Disney Channel release date	Teletoon / Télétoon release date	Prod. code	U.S. viewers (millions)
14	1	"Welcome Back Dusker"	Tibor Takacs	Tim Burns	June 29, 2008	September 6, 2008 / October 28, 2008	201	3.24
Sarah returns for the new school year; it is clear that she is now different after becoming a vampire, bolder and more confident. A green mist appears, going around killing vampires, but Ethan is blamed for the murders. Ethan, Benny, and Rory find a way to stop the green mist (called "The Breath of Death") and race to the vampire council to save the vampires from it, causing the council to lift Ethan's blame. Ethan questions the identity of the person who conjured the mist, concluding that the person must have a strong hatred toward vampires.
15	2	"Say You'll Be Maztak"	Kelly Harms	Jeff Biederman	July 6, 2008	September 13, 2008 / October 28, 2008	202	2.42
An ancient Mayan queen, Lucia (Shiva Negar), appears when Mr. G digs up a magic crystal skull and accidentally summons her. She prepares for a ritual that will unite her with the Sun King, which will cause the end of the world. Rory, Ethan and Benny all fall victim to her hypnotizing spell, leaving it up to Erica and Sarah to save them. The girls learn that Lucia is one of two sun gods who created the Earth, but were split by the Moon Goddess. By using Ethan's moonstones, Sarah and Erica manage to break Lucia's hold on their friends and destroy the skull, causing her to vanish forever.
16	3	"Fanged and Furious"	Tibor Takacs	Ethan Banville	July 20, 2008	September 20, 2008 / January 24, 2009	203	3.14
When Ethan finally gets his learner's permit, he buys an old, rusty car from a garage sale. It turns out the car is possessed by a bloodsucking backseat driver from beyond the grave. When the car starts attacking random people with Ethan behind the wheel, he has to figure out why and stop it in its tracks - or forever be labeled the one responsible for the attacks.
17	4	"Flushed"	Tibor Takacs	Jennifer Pertsch	July 26, 2009	September 27, 2008 / January 31, 2009	204	2.46
When the town's water pressure mysteriously drops and two teens go missing, the gang begins to suspect something fishy's going on in Whitechapel. Rory confesses to flushing two baby alligators last year at the same time that Benny flushed one of his magic potions. When Erica is attacked at the school car wash, they realize they're now battling two very angry alligators and their evil mutant spawn.
18	5	"Mirror/rorriM"	Laurie Lynd	Mike Kiss	August 10, 2008	October 11, 2008 / February 21, 2009	206	N/A
Whitechapel High is doing a play called "The Rainbow Factory", in which Erica is cast as an understudy, losing the lead role to a foreign exchange student, Sunday Clovers (Bindi Irwin). Clovers looks into the dressing room mirror and is then controlled by it. She breaks her legs, and Erica is cast as the lead. Ethan's mother tells Ethan that when Whitechapel High put on the first production of "The Rainbow Factory" 25 years ago, the lead star, Olivia, died onstage in a prank gone wrong. Ethan learns that Olivia is the ghost in the mirror, controlling her victims for revenge against all involved in the play. Erica is controlled by her, and Ethan, Sarah, and Benny have to stop Olivia's attempts to bring the house down on opening night.
19	6	"Village of the Darned"	Kelly Harms	Laurie Elliot	August 24, 2008	October 18, 2012 / February 28, 2013	207	2.87
During the annual donut drive for Jane's youth troop, a creepy troop leader (Niamh Wilson) conspires to rid the town of all adults and lure the kids to the Eternal Playground, a dimension for freedom from adults. With all the grownups gone, Ethan and the gang have to take charge and stop the beast before Jane and the other children are lost forever, but because the lack of adults in town, Sarah and Erica have to find a way to feed to satisfy their thirst or they'll be too weak to help Ethan and Benny.
20	7	"Hottie Ho-Tep"	Tibor Takacs	Miles Smith	September 7, 2008	November 1, 2008 / February 14, 2009	208	N/A
Benny steals a pancreas from an Egyptian mummy at the museum and it comes alive, searching for its organ, only to stumble across some magic potions in Benny’s home, which regenerate him into a handsome teenager, who quickly forms a mutual attraction with Sarah. Ethan and Benny must stop Ho-Tep before he takes Sarah with him to the underworld.
21	8	"Independence Daze"	Tibor Takacs	Simon Racioppa & Richard Elliott	September 14, 2008	November 22, 2008 / March 28, 2009	211	2.19
After Ethan, Benny, and Sarah boast about being able to handle their adventures on their own, they each wake up alone, trapped in separate dimensions where they must face their own fears. Sarah's fear is becoming an evil, bloodthirsty vampire, Benny's is a psychotic dentist robot from a scary movie, and Ethan is chased by a cloaked figure. The three find a way to come together, and escape with Erica's help. Benny's grandma reveals that she was the one who put them in their own universe to show them they needed each other. However, Ethan was supposed to be alone in his dimension, as his fear is losing his friends; Benny's grandma had not summoned any cloaked creature. She theorizes that this means danger is coming. Note: The danger that Benny's grandma was talking about at the end leads up to "The Date to End All Dates". The two part season 2 finale.
22	9	"Siren Song"	Tibor Takacs	Alice Prodanou & Mike Kiss	September 16, 2008	November 15, 2008 / March 21, 2009	209	2.83
Ethan and Benny discover that a local singing sensation, Serena (Kendra Timmins), may have a voice like an angel, but in reality she's a Siren - a mythical creature whose song brings out the self-destructive worst in anyone who hears it. They team up with Sarah, Erica and Rory to form a band and blow her off the stage at the school talent show but Erica gets put under her trance and attacks Sarah before she exudes her power.
23	10	"Jockenstein"	Laurie Lynd	Miles Smith	September 21, 2008	October 4, 2008 / February 7, 2009	205	TBA
The school hockey team's new star player, Boltz, has the strongest arms, legs and hands in the league. Boltz is revealed to be inhuman; these body parts were all stolen from different deceased people to create him. Sarah is accused of stealing from the dead by the vampire council, but Sarah discovers that someone else is doing the stealing, someone who is connected to Boltz's creation. The one behind the thefts conspires to take out Ethan's brain to add as a last addition to Boltz, putting Ethan in grave danger.
24	11	"Halloweird"	TW Peacocke	Jeff Biederman	September 23, 2008	October 25, 2008 / March 14, 2009	210	2.75
Ethan's nerd-fest Halloween party becomes dangerous when Rory's magical mask transforms the guests into real versions of their costumes. Benny must make things right, and he has until midnight to reverse the spell, or the transformations will all be permanent. Rory manages to turn everyone at the party into their respective creatures. With combined effort of cursed Benny and Ethan, they destroy the mask and reverse its magic. While under the influence, Erica is transformed into a traditional old vampire, Benny into 'El Merlo Loco' [a combination of Merlin and a Mexican wrestler], and Ethan and Sarah are transformed into the head characters of 'Dusk' and almost kiss before the spell is broken.
25	12	"The Date to End All Dates" (Part 1)	Farhad Mann	Story by : Tim Burns; Teleplay by : Jennifer Pertsch	September 28, 2008	November 29, 2008 / April 4, 2009	212	2.31
In part 1 of the 2-part series finale, Ethan discovers through a vision that the Cloaked Attacker from episode "Independence Daze" is after the Lucifractor, something greatly feared. Due to a bet with Benny, Ethan asks Sarah on a date and she agrees. Benny and Rory work together to find the Lucifractor during Ethan's dinner date with Sarah at a vampire restaurant. Ethan is dragged into a telepathic link with Jesse, who tells him the purpose of the Lucifractor: to drain dark energy, including what is needed to keep vampires alive. After Rory nearly collapses from touching the Lucifractor, Benny drags him to the restaurant and Ethan uses the Lucifractor to trap its keeper. He brings it to school with him to safeguard it but the weapon is taken by Vice Principal Stern, who places it in a box with the same symbol as the one on the Attacker's cloak. Note: Vanessa Morgan and Kate Todd sing the theme song for this episode.
26	13	"The Date to End All Dates" (Part 2)	Farhad Mann	Mike Kiss	October 5, 2008	December 6, 2008 / April 11, 2009	213	N/A
In part 2 of the 2-part series finale, Ethan has a vision in which Stern tells him that he plans to use the Lucifractor to take back Whitechapel from the vampires who stole the town and the weapon from his family. Ethan starts seeing everyone as dead people. Grandma reveals that Stern put a spell on him to weaken him so that he is seeing his worst fear. He can win if he finds something stronger than fear. Ethan goes into a panic attack but Benny and Sarah calm him down. He holds their hands, which ends the fear-binding spell. Jesse joins them at Ethan's request. At the Vampire Council, Benny, controlled by Stern, attacks them but Ethan saves him. Ethan goes into Stern's mind and tells him he is weak. Angry, Stern begins absorbing the power. Outside of town, Erica and Rory watch the huge explosion going off as the head of the vampire council forces them to flee with all the other vampires. It is unknown if Sarah, Ethan, Benny, and Jesse survived. Note: Vanessa Morgan and Kate Todd sing the theme song for this episode.
