= List of My Babysitter's a Vampire characters =

The following is a list of characters from the television series My Babysitter's a Vampire, which is based on the movie.

== Main characters ==
=== Ethan ===
Ethan Morgan (portrayed by Matthew Knight) is a geeky sci-fi-loving 15-year-old who discovers that his little sister's babysitter Sarah, is a vampire. Awkward, sweet and well-meaning, Ethan just wants to have a normal high school experience. But the constant paranormal chaos of Whitechapel make that nearly impossible. Ethan is a Seer. Seers are able to see visions through touch. His visions help him learn more about supernatural forces. Ethan lacks social skills because of which he usually finds himself lost when it comes to navigating social waters. Ethan is understood most by Benny, whom he has been best friends with since childhood. He loves playing video games and is book-smart. He is more sarcastic than Benny and thinks things through carefully. He cares for his loved ones and will go to any height to protect them. He is in the chess club along with Benny. Although Benny often gets the two of them into sticky situations, Ethan is usually able to find a way out. His biggest fear was being alone but that all changed on Season 2 (independence daze) Later on Ethan begins to develop a romantic relationship with best friend and supernatural partner Sarah in the two part Season 2 finale, "The Date to End All Dates."

=== Sarah ===
Sarah (portrayed by Vanessa Morgan) is Jane's babysitter, and one of Ethan's best friends who he has a crush on. Although most times, she ends up babysitting Ethan and Benny as well. By the time the pilot movie begins, she is already a new vampire, bitten by her ex-boyfriend Jesse. Since she has not drunk human blood, she is only a fledgling, not fully human, not fully vampire. Hoping for a cure to become human again, Sarah tries her best to fit into high school and be a normal teenage girl, though she is unsuccessful. She refrains from human blood and instead, drinks a human blood substitute that Benny's grandmother makes. Sarah usually aids Ethan and Benny in their quests to defeat supernatural forces and has excellent fighting skills which, combined with her superhuman strength and speed, make her a formidable opponent. She struggles to keep her friends protected from evil vampires, particularly Jesse. In the first-season finale, she finally turns into a full vampire when Ethan is bitten by Jesse and she drinks his blood to get the venom out. Although upset at first, she is later shown to somewhat accept what she is in the end. Later on Sarah begins to develop a romantic relationship with best friend and supernatural partner Ethan Morgan in the two part Season 2 finale, "The Date to End All Dates."

=== Benny ===
Benny Weir (portrayed by Atticus Mitchell) is Ethan's loud and goofy best friend. He is similar to Ethan, being geeky. He often gets into trouble with his antics. Benny has been Ethan's best friend since they were 6 years old. He and Ethan understand each other better than anyone else, although Benny is funnier and more outspoken than Ethan. Benny can be just as brave and strategically clever as his pal, though he only showcases these abilities in the most-dire of situations. Since learning of his powers, Benny's dream is to make it big as a sorcerer and paranormal expert. He is told by his grandma that he is a Spellmaster and can cast magical spells, although his magic usually goes wrong due to his lack of practice. Benny often tries to lighten the mood when things get too intense. He is girl-crazy and frequently drags Ethan into his schemes, getting them both in trouble. Despite that, Benny is a genuine friend to Ethan and is always ready to go on another adventure. In season two, Benny begins to improve on his magic, becoming more helpful than in the first season. Benny secretly has a crush on Erica. But he doesn't know that she starts to feel the same.

=== Rory ===
Rory Keaner (portrayed by Cameron Kennedy) is Ethan and Benny's geeky, dimwitted, and funny, vampire friend. He is turned into a vampire after being bitten by Erica at a vampire-infested party. No matter how odd Ethan and Benny are, Rory still manages to be the odd man out. He is even more immature than Ethan and Benny and has ideas that often gets him or all three of them into bad situations. Rory is a follower instead of a leader and has a major crush on Erica and is always eager to impress her, a trend which is in line with the traditional biter-bitten relationship. He is easily manipulated and does whatever he is told to do which leads him to become a full vampire (in the movie he says that his first reason for drinking human blood was because "everyone else was doing it"). Ethan and Benny mostly try to keep Rory out of their adventures, knowing that Rory can get himself into danger with his weak intellect. Rory includes himself nevertheless and though he can be foolish, he supports Ethan and Benny to the best of his ability. Embracing his new-found vampirism, he goes through several short-lived personae including 'Vampire Ninja' and 'Rory Vampire'. He's a fond lover of animals both as pets (he kept a cat called Mr Kitty and two alligators which he mistook for iguanas) and as a delicacy. In the movie he promises Ethan he'll not drink human blood again and sticks to this promise throughout the series only hunting animals, something other vampires including Sarah and Erica find disgusting, though he happily drinks bagged human blood again in "Blood Drive" and "Fanged and Furious" where he fights over a phial of it with Erica. In "The Date to end All Dates- Part 2" he shows courage (or complete stupidity) being ready to face a hooded menace until he finds out the intruder is his vice-principal, only at this point does he cow down and runs. He later displays his loyalty with Erica when he says that "if there's a fight coming I want to be here with my friends", he only avoids the battle when placed under Anastasia's powerful glamour. Rory's last name "Keaner" was shown on a computer screen in episode "Siren Song".

=== Erica ===
Erica (portrayed by Kate Todd) is a vampire and Sarah's best friend. She is a huge fan of the "Dusk" series. (Dusk is a parody of the Twilight series) Erica becomes a vampire after being bitten by Gord (one of Jesse's friends) in the same vampire-infested party where Rory was also bitten. Erica is the kind of girl who gets revenge if someone does her wrong. She used to be a nerd when human but has become beautiful since turning into a vampire, a fact she is very proud of. Erica doesn't share an actual friendship with Ethan and Benny but speaks to them when necessary. She is annoyed mostly by Rory and makes sure not to be seen with him. However, she uses his crush on her as an advantage to get him to do things for her. Although Erica is conceited and shallow, she genuinely cares for Sarah and always comes through for her. In the first-season finale, she supports Sarah after Sarah becomes a full vampire and tells her that they will (literally) be friends forever. In the second season, Erica becomes closer to Ethan and Benny as well, and subsequently becomes more active in their heroic activities. Erica seeks out Benny to help Sarah out after she dumped the new vice principal in a trash can, Benny doing a forgetting spell and gathers him and Ethan to testify against the Vampire Council's accusations. In "Say You'll Be Maztak", Erica helps Sarah get their male classmates out of a spell where they were controlled by Lucia, who wanted to be reunited with her Sun King. Erica seemed to be jealous that Ethan and Benny were all over Lucia, not believing that they were blowing her and Sarah off for her. In "Mirror/rorriM", Erica is controlled by a ghost trapped in a dressing room mirror during the school's production of the play, "The Rainbow Factory". Benny, Ethan, and Sarah manage to get the ghost out of Erica, in the middle of the play, the audience assuming they were performing. In "Village of the Darned", Benny makes a potion mixed with his blood for Erica and Sarah (because the towns' older citizens were possessed by an evil girl scout troop leaders cookies), Erica initially takes dislike to drinking blood from children and teenagers, citing it had fats; but Erica confides to Sarah that she liked Benny's blood, that it was "the best she ever tasted", and she might be starting to have feelings for him. In "The Date to End All Dates", while the vampire community is preparing to evacuate Whitechapel (in which Erica reluctantly and unwillingly helps them do), Erica helps Sarah and Ethan prepare for their first date, even choosing their restaurant, which was a vampire restaurant, where the staff assumed Ethan was Sarah's meal.

== Recurring Characters ==
=== Jane Morgan ===
Jane Morgan (portrayed by Ella Jonas Farlinger) is Ethan's younger, 9-year-old sister. She has her own strange view of the world around her. Jane knows about Ethan's, Benny's, Sarah's, Rory's and Erica's supernatural abilities and keeps the secret, often helping along when they are in dangerous situations. She usually gets her way by blackmailing Ethan, threatening to tell their parents about all of Ethan, Benny, and Sarah's secret adventures. Although she is manipulative, she cares for Ethan and shares a friendly and easy relationship with Benny. Jane seems to have certain limited abilities to cast spells; She once used one of Benny's spells to bring one of her dolls to life and gets her parents and others turned into little dolls after being touched by Jane's doll, prompting Ethan, Benny and Sarah to come to the rescue and turn everyone back to normal again.

=== Samantha Morgan ===
Samantha Morgan (portrayed by Laura DeCarteret) is the mother of Ethan and Jane Morgan. She is a fun-loving, supportive mom to Ethan and Jane, and will do whatever she can to keep her kids happy. She and her husband go out on date nights every Friday, which is when Sarah is needed to babysit. Although she doesn't quite understand her kids, she loves them all the same.

=== Ross Morgan ===
Ross Morgan (portrayed by Ari Cohen) is the father of Ethan & Jane Morgan and Samantha Morgan's husband. When Ross isn't taking cookery/dancing/archery lessons with his wife, he sells insurance – which oddly enough is something people in Whitechapel seem to need a lot of. Ross is a proud father to Ethan and Jane, even though he doesn't always understand his son's geeky hobbies. But that doesn't stop him from trying to connect with him.

=== Benny's Grandma ===
Benny's Grandma Evelyn (portrayed by Joan Gregson) is an Earth Priestess (a witch on the side of good) who knows what to do in every situation that Ethan and Benny get themselves into. She also has everything that often ends up causing the problem. She tends to be sardonic, especially while scolding the boys.

=== Principal Hicks ===
Principal Hicks (played by Hrant Alianak) is the often dimwitted principal of Whitechapel High School, usually blissfully unaware of what is really going on around him. He often appears concerned about Ethan and Benny because of their weirdness and unusual hobbies.

=== Jesse ===
Jesse (portrayed by Joe Dinicol) is an evil vampiric cult leader and main antagonist in the movie. In the original settlement of Whitechapel, he was a priest named Reverend Horace Black, and led an evil vampire cult. In recent times, he poses as a high school student. His personality is pure callous, being willing to sacrifice any follower for his own gains. This is shown numerous times such as in the movie when he didn't react to the news that his entire new cult was eliminated by Ethan, Benny and Sarah, and in The Date to end All Dates when he admitted he'd let "most of his old flock" get wiped out by the Lucrifractor two hundred years ago and was extremely willing to let Benny be destroyed when the would-be wizard temporarily turned against them. His plan throughout the movie was to use the cubile animus to exchange the souls of 219 Dusk fans in order to resurrect the 219 ancient souls of the vampires in his cult, known as the "Black Army". He was also the vampire who originally sired Sarah, turning her into a fledgling, and his minions turned Rory and Erica into vampires at his house party. When Ethan and Benny become aware of the existence of vampires, they team up with Sarah to help stop Jesse. Days later Jesse comes close to succeeding in his plan but he and his minions are killed by Ethan and Benny before he can complete it. In the first-season finale, he returns from the grave after Ethan and Benny dig up and inadvertently open the cubile animus he was trapped in. He tries to convince Sarah to become a full vampire so they can be together and leave Whitechapel. When Sarah refuses, Jesse bites Ethan's wrist to infect him with vampire venom, compelling Sarah to save him and become a full vampire after all. Jesse leaves, unharmed, and is later banished from Whitechapel by the Vampire Council for being an "undesirable element". Jesse returns in the Season 2 finale to give Ethan a message about someone seeking the powers of the Lucifractor. He says that he cannot deal with it himself due to his banishment. Following Stern succeeding in driving out the vampire council, Ethan invites Jesse back, as he managed to defeat the original wizard Gaelon Sinisteral. Jesse joins them in facing Stern. Jesse is a handsome but sinister vampire whose charming smile hides a deep, dark secret that is centuries old. Not one to leave his fangs idle for long, Jesse has ambitious plans that he is determined to see succeed. he hopes to one day control not only all of whitechapel, but especially the heart of one beautiful young lady named Sarah.

=== Mr. G ===
Mr. G (portrayed by Ryan Blakely) is a teacher who often gets wrapped up in the supernatural goings-on that happen at the school, whether he is fully aware or not. He first appears in "Double Negative" to take the yearbook photos but an evil version of Hannah Price is out to use Benny's grandmother's evil camera to make evil doubles of the students. Mr. G is also seen as the school's wrestling team coach in "Friday Night Frights". Mr. G unearths a crystal skull which summons Lucia, a queen looking for her Sun King. Mr. G is later controlled by Lucia, she seeking him to be bearer of a sacred vessel. When the spell is broken over Mr. G (and the other male students), he gives Sarah and Erica detention for smashing the skull he dug up, Mr. G never gave students detention prior to this.

=== Vice Principal Stern ===
Vice Principal Stern (portrayed by Richard Waugh) The new vice principal in Whitechapel's high school and the main antagonist in season two. He made his first appearance in "Welcome back Dusker" where he was quickly met with Sarah's highly emotional wrath and was plunged headfirst into a trashcan by the newly fully-fledged vampire. His Great grandfather (Gaelon Sinisteral) was a wizard who hated vampires, and attempted to wipe them out but was defeated by Reverend Horace Black (a.k.a. Jesse). Centuries later, Stern planned to do the same. Around the same time as he got the job as vice principal, he conjured the breath of death to begin his vampire genocide, but that plan soon failed. In The Date to End all Dates we also learn from Erica that she despised him since he banned the Dusk Fanclub, no doubt due to its affiliation with vampires. He later attempts to kill Ethan in "Independence Daze" whilst wearing a Grim Reaper-esque disguise and is referred to as "some guy without a face". In the episode Date To End All Dates, his secret is revealed that his new goal was finding the Lucifactor to wipe out all vampires in Whitechapel. He attempts to steal it from Benny and Rory after they find it in the abandoned Darkwood hotel, but was thwarted when he found himself face to face with Jesse's "guard dog". Later he confiscates the Lucifractor from Benny and places Ethan under a spell, making him fear everyone is dead. When Stern attacks the vampire council, he kills several vampires and chases the rest away. He plans to use their beacon (which Jesse states is referred to as "the Caller") to broadcast the Lucifractor's power across town. Benny is put temporarily under his control, but is taken out by his own magic and the vice-principal is soon defeated by Ethan after Sarah and Jesse successfully distract him. Ethan telepathically attacks Stern, and uses the man's own arrogance against him, causing him to absorb energy from the Lucifractor and results in a huge explosion.

== Minor characters ==
=== Gord ===
Gord (portrayed Nathan Stephenson) is Jesse's right-hand man, and another vampire. He becomes Erica's boyfriend and turns her into a vampire. He is later killed in the climax by holy water rigged sprinklers.

=== Della ===
Della (portrayed by Rebecca Dalton) is a normal student at Whitechapel High, who gets her heart broken after the death of her dog, Puffles. Benny brings Puffles back to life to woo her but ends up bringing to life every other dead animal buried in the ground. This ends up driving her away from Benny. Della is said to be attending therapy since she can't forget Puffles. Della is seen again in the first-season finale at the school dance, later talking with Rory.

=== Stephanie ===
Stephanie (portrayed by Leah Renee Cudmore (young), Susan Robertson (elder)) is an old witch, disguised as the cheerleader captain, and the antagonist of the episode, Three Cheers for Evil. She went to school with Benny's grandmother but physically looks 17 because she has used her powers to maintain immortality. It's revealed that Stephanie teased Erica when Erica used to be a nerd as a human. Stephanie puts a spell on Erica and Sarah so they obey her. On the night of the school pep rally, Ethan and Benny are able to thwart her plan to steal the souls of the student body and Stephanie's real age is unmasked. An old Stephanie ends up as a lunch lady at Whitechapel High.

=== Annie Vee ===
Annie "Hot Nurse" Vee (portrayed by Kristin Adams) is the Hot Nurse who appeared in the episode "Blood Drive". Annie was the better-looking and younger nurse at the Blood Drive in Whitechapel. She is a vampire who has worked with the older vampire nurse for years, using blood drives to get their food. She thinks she can do anything and does not like to get involved with the Vampire Council. Benny only went to donate blood because he wanted Annie to do it. Benny then learns she is one of the bloodsuckers and lets Erica and Rory away for a pint of blood from Ethan.

=== Older Nurse ===
The Older Nurse (portrayed by Amy Ciupak Lalonde) is a character who appeared in the episode Blood Drive. She and Annie are vampire nurses that first appeared in Blood Drive. She makes all the decisions and is the leader of the two. She always thinks that mistakes should be justified and wanted to take Erica and Rory to the Vampire Council for stealing food from their own kind. She took blood out of Benny when he thought that Annie would.

=== Debbie Dazzle ===
Debbie Dazzle (portrayed by Georgina Reilly) is Jane's favorite doll. She was turned into a human after Jane cast a spell on her to fix her broken leg. She is the antagonist in the episode "Guys and Dolls." Debby loves cupcakes, ice cream, disco-dance parties and make overs. Debbie didn't like being a doll, claiming that it was boring and she wanted to have fun. In order to stay in human form, she sucks life energy out of humans, thus turning them into dolls. Jane manages to reverse the spell to change Debbie back into a doll. But in the end she turn her head at the audience and wink at them. Her counterpart doll is Dazzle Dan. Her look is seemingly based on Katy Perry, though this is never mentioned in the series.

=== Hannah Price ===
Hannah Price (portrayed by Kiana Madeira) is the photographer, and the leader of the yearbook committee at Whitechapel High in the episode Double Negative. Ethan and Benny mistakenly believe she has a crush on Ethan after misinterpreting her actions. It was found at the end, that she had a boyfriend. She bought a camera from Benny at a yard sale for $10 and wanted to use the camera for yearbook photos, not knowing of its evil powers.

=== Coach Ed ===
Coach Ed (portrayed by Clé Bennett) is a character in the episode, Friday Night Frights. He is a ghost whose spirit was locked into Whitechapel High's sole sports trophy. His spirit was released when Ethan held the trophy, and haunted him relentlessly. Ethan tried to confide in Sarah and Benny to get rid of him, but in the end he agreed to win a new trophy for his spirit to move on. Though Ethan 'cheated' to win the trophy, the coach's spirit was banished by the ghosts of those he coached.

=== Kurt "The Hurt" Lochner ===
Kurt Lochner (portrayed by William Greenblatt) is an ace wrestler who appears in Friday Night Frights. In this episode, he is dating Erica, and Sarah is led to suspect that he is a vampire and tries to investigate; only leading Ethan to think that she likes him.

Ethan and Kurt meet during a wrestling match, and Ethan wins a trophy by pinching him to the floor and tickling his neck to keep him under. He tries to beat up Ethan, but Sarah knocks him to the ground and confirms that he has been "beaten by a geek and a girl". He is last seen on a date with Erica, who shows him her fangs. It is unknown what happened to him later.

=== David Stachowski ===
David Stachowski (portrayed by Jake Epstein) is a character from the episode Blue Moon. He is the hairiest jock at Whitechapel High and very popular. He makes Ethan and Benny his best friends but Ethan suspects that David is a werewolf and has a motive behind making them his friends. Benny tries a spell to expose him, but it has no effect whatsoever. However Ethan has a vision that confirms his suspicions of David. He then sees that David scratched him and starts to turn into a werewolf. It is revealed that David knew Ethan is a Seer and was hoping Ethan could help him find the cure to become human again. During a party at Ethan's house, Ethan and Benny find out that David isn't an actual werewolf after Sarah, Benny, Rory, and Erica mistake Ethan as David; he simply turns into a shaggy dog under the full moon, making him a weredog.

=== Doug Falconhawk/Machowski ===
Doug Falconhawk (true name Doug Machowski, portrayed by Thomas Mitchell) is the host of his own television show that called him the Scarefinder. Rory, Benny and Ethan are his only fans because his lack of locating paranormal activities is boring the audience except those three. He makes his first appearance in Doug The Vampire Hunter and hires the kids to hunt vampires. His show is eventually ruined by his fans.

=== Dirk Baddison ===
Dirk Baddison (played by Jamie Johnston) is the actor who portrays the vampire named James in the Dusk series, he appears in "Welcome Back Dusker" when Ethan starts the rumor that he's coming to Whitechapel, in order to get Sarah to come back. Erica abducts Dirk, showing him that she's a vampire and that vampires are real, Dirk involuntarily gets dragged in front of the vampire council with Erica, and the head of the council likes Dirk, wanting his autograph for "a friend". Dirk is placed into a psychiatric facility after going to the media and saying he has a vampire girlfriend, pictures he took with Erica showed that only he was in the pictures, because vampires don't show up on film.

=== Anastasia ===
Anastasia (portrayed by Addison Holley) is first introduced in "Welcome back Dusker" as a little girl who is after Ethan and Sarah because vampires are being attacked by an ominous green mist later identified by Benny as, "The Breath of Death". She initially accuses Ethan of being the one behind the vampire attacks as he is a known vampire hunter and because vampires sent by the Council to retrieve his love interest Sarah were killed in his garden. When one of the other council members is taken over by the Breath of Death and tries to go after her, Ethan saves her and she believes that he has nothing to do with it. She secretly likes Dirk Baddison, asking to have his autograph "for a friend". Her personality is heavily juxtaposed to her demeanor, as she is very assertive (despite being on a council where each member has an equal vote, she always takes charge and no one seems willing to go against her) and also sinister and scary, usually resorting to death threats to get things done. Rory claims she's "scary" (at the end of "The Date to End All Dates") while Benny refers to her as "Little Miss Fang-Fang". Her sense of style both in her outfits and possessions (such as her choice of duffle bag in "The Date to end all Dates- Part 2") shows that despite her youthful appearance she is actually several centuries old. Despite banishing him, she is somewhat similar to Jesse, being quick to use force, mind control and is very willing to sacrifice her followers to save herself (Jesse freely admits he allowed most of his "flock" to be Lucifractored so he could defeat Stern's great-grandfather and Anastasia happily sent guards at Stern knowing they had no chance of defeating him while she fled Whitechapel. She also says that Stern could "have this town" (Whitechapel), in essence leaving every vampire in Whitechapel at the mercy of the vengeful vice-principal by leaving the Caller (a device Jesse says the Council uses to communicate with other covens) undefended). Most likely she only forced Rory and Erica to flee with her as all her remaining guards were busy holding off Stern while the rest of her Council had already fled.

=== Lucia ===
Lucia (portrayed by Shiva Negar) is a queen in search of her Sun King, Mr. G summons her when he digs up a crystal skull around the school. Lucia uses Mr. G and his male students to get reunited with her Sun King. The students make an altar out of the classroom desks for Lucia along with finding things such as animal hearts, gold, and jewelry. And Lucia initially chooses Rory to be "The Chosen One", or a sacrifice to the Sun King, but when she learns Rory is a vampire and isn't pure, she moves onto Ethan instead, who is breaking from Lucia's control over him. Sarah and Erica defeat Lucia after learning that the Moon could interfere with Lucia's plan, they use Moon rocks that Ethan bought to get their friends and classmates out of Lucia's spell. Ethan destroys Lucia using a Moon rock, the skull crashing to the floor in the process.

=== Malcolm Bruner ===
Malcolm Bruner (portrayed by Scott Beaudin) is a Whitechapel High student whose grandfather had recently passed in the episode "Fanged and Furious". Ethan wanted to buy his grandfather's clunker car, but chose against it when he learned the car was possessed by a vampire. Bruner threatens to have Ethan's learner's permit revoked because he thinks Ethan stole the car and tried to run him over with it. When he came to school the next day he was all bandaged up and Rory told him his bandages were leaking.

=== Sunday Clovers ===
Sunday Clovers (portrayed by Bindi Irwin) is an energetic foreign exchange student from Australia who becomes lead in the school's upcoming play, "The Rainbow Factory", where Erica is assigned as her understudy. Clovers looks in a possessed dressing room mirror and she is controlled by the ghost trapped in it, to harm her classmates involved in the play. In the process of doing that, Clovers cuts numerous sandbags hoping to hurt her classmates, many of them fell on her in the process, breaking both of her legs; Sarah thought suspiciously that Erica did it to become lead in the play. Clovers watches a controlled Erica on stage the night of the play, sitting by Ethan's mother, both amazed at Erica's "acting".

=== Boltz ===
In "Jockenstein", Boltz is a robotic hockey player at Whitechapel High, invented by the coach to win games, taking human body parts to make him. The coach abducts Ethan and tries to take Ethan's brain and put it into Boltz to make him the greatest hockey player ever, until Sarah manages to stop the coach while Benny and Erica try to dismantle Boltz.

=== Hottie Ho-Tep ===
Hottie Ho-Tep (portrayed by Jesse Rath) is an ancient Egyptian mummy that took the form of a human teen by taking magical objects from Benny's home, after Benny took his pancreas, causing his mummy to break out of its sarcophagus. Hottie falls for Sarah and vice versa, trying to take her back to the underworld with her as his. Benny and Ethan manage to stop him by shaking Hottie's ancient artifacts that were buried with him.

=== Serena ===
Serena (portrayed by Kendra Timmins) is a local singing sensation who has the voice of an angel, but in reality she's a siren; a mythical creature whose songs bring out the self-destructive worst in anyone who hears it. Ethan, Benny, and Rory sign up for the talent show to stop Serena, using her songs against her, to stop her from bringing out the worst of people in the whole town.

=== Richard Bruner ===
Richard (portrayed by Trevor Coll) is grandson of Milfred Bruner. A tall, handsome, snooty prep-school kid. Extremely condescending. Younger version of the Winklevoss twins from The Social Network. The gang figures out that Richard is the latest target of the evil car...so in order to save Richard they invite him over under the pretense of taking his picture for a "Charity Photo Shoot" and draw a tube of his blood. Rory takes on his identity to attract the evil car and stop it from its rage.

=== Vivian Keaner ===
Vivian Keaner (portrayed by Marsha Mason) is Rory's mother who is first seen in "Siren Song", cheering her son on at the school's talent show. Vivian bored Benny's grandmother in the audience with stories of what Rory does, praising that he'd be a veterinarian one day, blissfully unaware that her son's recent interest in small mammals was actually due to finding them more delicious than cute. Benny's grandmother turned off her hearing aid as a result. Backstage, Rory gets nervous when he hears his mum is in the audience, not because he's worried for his safety but actually for the rest of the audience as he claims his mum can "really throw them" in terms of throwing punches. Ms. Keaner is later seen to be taken over by Serena's songs, punching out a lady in the audience.
