= MBAV =

MBAV may refer to:

- Modular Body Armor Vest
- My Babysitter's a Vampire, a 2010 Canadian vampire-adventure and comedy horror television film starring Matthew Knight, Vanessa Morgan, and Atticus Mitchell.
  - My Babysitter's a Vampire (TV series), (2011—2012) a television spin-off of the film above, a show about three teens taking on supernatural forces including zombies, demons, ghosts, witches, and other creatures taking over their high school and their town.
