= Laura de Carteret =

Canadian actress

- Born: Canada
- Occupation: Actor
- Known for: Diary of the Dead

Laura de Carteret is a Canadian actress from St. Catharines, Ontario. She is most noted for her recurring role as Janet in the television series Seed, for which she was a Canadian Screen Award nominee for Best Supporting Actress in a Comedy Series at the 2nd Canadian Screen Awards in 2014.

A longtime stage actress, she was a Dora Mavor Moore Award nominee for Best Actress in a Play, Large Theatre for her performance as Gertrude in Necessary Angel's 2009 production of Hamlet.

== Filmography ==
=== Film ===
Year	Title	Role	Notes
2004	Dawn of the Dead	Washington Politician	
2004	Mean Girls	Taylor Wedell's Mom	
2006	Jekyll + Hyde	Pharmacist	
2006	Heartstopper	Denise Grafton	
2007	Shoot 'Em Up	Woman in Museum	
2007	Diary of the Dead	Bree	
2008	Magic Flute Diaries	Ziggy	
2008	The Rocker	Amelia's Mom	
2009	Chloe	Alicia	
2010	The Shrine	Laura Taylor	
2010	Red	Fundraiser Greeter	
2010	Ruby Skye P.I.: The Spam Scam	Lillian O'Shyte	
2012	The Conspiracy	Nicole Higgins	
2012	Ruby Skye P.I.: The Haunted Library	Lillian O'Shyte	
2016	Standoff	Woman	
2016	The Second Time Around	Helen	
2016	An American Dream: The Education of William Bowman	Amelia Payne	
2018	The Holiday Calendar	Judy Sutton	
2019	Georgetown	Eleanor Price	
2024	The Invisibles	Amy	

=== Television ===
Year	Title	Role	Notes
1993	Street Legal	Joan Shales	Episode: "Black and White in Color"
1993	E.N.G.	Reporter	Episode: "Judgement of Solomon"
1995	The Hardy Boys	Madeline Corrington	Episode: "Say Cheese"
1999	Mind Prey	Eleanor	Television film
1999	Total Recall 2070	Doctor Spence	Episode: "Burning Desire"
1999	Half a Dozen Babies	Indianapolis TV Reporter	Television film
1999–2005	Queer as Folk	Client / Dr. Judith Davidson	3 episodes
2000	The Wonderful World of Disney	Sister Greta	Episode: "Santa Who?"
2001	The Associates	Deborah Fitch	Episode: "Encumbered"
2001	Blue Murder	Det. Lillian Young	Episode: "Family Man"
2002	The Pact	Betty	Television film
2002	Chasing Cain II: Face	Constance	Television film
2003	America's Prince: The John F. Kennedy Jr. Story	Female Morning Host	Television film
2003	Tarzan	Agent Woods	Episode: "Wages of Sin"
2004	Redemption: The Stan Tookie Williams Story	Morgan Spokesperson	Television film
2004	1-800-Missing	Marion Grey	Episode: "These Dreams Before Me"
2004	Wild Card	Dr. Valerie Vickers	Episode: "Dr. Sidney Loses a Kidney"
2004	Kevin Hill	Judge Wagner	Episode: "The Unexpected"
2004, 2005	This Is Wonderland	Claire	2 episodes
2004, 2006	Puppets Who Kill	Plumpkin's Assistant / Lucy	2 episodes
2005	Widow on the Hill	Lexie	Television film
2005	The West Wing	Reporter No. 6	Episode: "Freedonia"
2005	Our Fathers	Female Reporter	Television film
2006	Miss Spider's Sunny Patch Friends	Queen Sapphire	Episode: "The Prince, the Princess and the Bee"
2006	Angela's Eyes	Diane Young	Episode: "Blue-Eyed Blues"
2009	Flashpoint	Wendy Polsen	Episode: "Clean Hands"
2009	Family Biz	Bea Mulch	Episode: "Focus Pocus"
2009	Everything She Ever Wanted	Jennifer Greene	2 episodes
2010	Double Wedding	Elle Greenfield	Television film
2010	My Babysitter's a Vampire	Samantha Morgan	Television film
2010	Lost Girl	Dr. Hansen	Episode: "Food for Thought"
2010–2011	Babar and the Adventures of Badou	Voice	15 episodes
2011	Good Dog	Carpenter's Agent	Episode: "Jack Nicholson"
2011	Rookie Blue	Annie Novatski	Episode: "Butterflies"
2011	Suits	Sylvia Perkins	Episode: "Identity Crisis"
2011	Silent Witness	Nancy Calder	Television film
2011–2012	My Babysitter's a Vampire	Samantha Morgan	26 episodes
2012	Degrassi: The Next Generation	Mrs. Clarke	Episode: "Hollaback Girl: Part 1"
2012	The Listener	Mary Donleavy	Episode: "She Sells Sanctuary"
2012	The L.A. Complex	Dr. Karen	2 episodes
2012	Transporter: The Series	Ali	Episode: "The General's Daughter"
2013	Murdoch Mysteries	Mrs. Smythe	2 episodes
2013–2014	Seed	Dr. Janet Colborne	26 episodes
2014	Touring T.O.	Marie Anne (2014)	Episode: "It's Only a Rickshaw"
2014	A Wish Come True	Carrie	Television film
2015	Two Wrongs	Sandra	Television film
2015	Backpackers	Donna Webber	2 episodes
2015	Riftworld Chronicles	Chantal	8 episodes
2015	Saving Hope	Vivian Gerbasi	Episode: "Sympathy for the Devil"
2015	Hemlock Grove	Ricki Gans	Episode: "A Place to Fall"
2017	Conviction	Dawn Carter	Episode: "Not Okay"
2017	Mary Kills People	Dr. Ingress	Episode: "Wave the White Flag"
2017	Good Witch	Constance	Episode: "A Birthday Wish"
2018	Frankie Drake Mysteries	Mrs. Enfield	Episode: "The Last Dance"
2019	V Wars	Sasha Giroux	3 episodes
2020	Mrs. America	Giddy Dyer	Episode: "Gloria"
2021	Designed with Love	Gabriella	Television film
2021	Y: The Last Man	Lisa Murray	5 episodes
2021	The Lost Symbol	Isabel Solomon	6 episodes
2022	Pretty Hard Cases	Marley Briggs	4 episodes
2023	The Way Home	Jude	2 episodes
