= Finding My Way =

Finding My Way may refer to:

- Finding My Way (Rush song), a song by Rush
- Finding My Way (album), a 2012 album by Kate Todd
- Finding My Way (book), a 2025 book by Malala Yousafzai
