= Survival of the Dead =

2009 horror film by George A. Romero

- Theatrical release poster
- Directed by: George A. Romero
- Written by: George A. Romero
- Produced by: Paula Devonshire
- Starring: Alan van Sprang; Kenneth Welsh; Kathleen Munroe; Richard Fitzpatrick; Athena Karkanis; Stefano Di Matteo; Joris Jarsky; Eric Woolfe; Julian Richings; Wayne Robson
- Cinematography: Adam Swica
- Edited by: Michael Doherty
- Music by: Robert Carli
- Production companies: Artfire Films; Romero-Grunwald Productions; Devonshire Productions
- Distributed by: Entertainment One (Canada); Magnet Releasing (US)
- Release date: September 9, 2009 (Venice)
- Running time: 90 minutes
- Countries: Canada; United States
- Language: English
- Budget: $4 million
- Box office: $386,078

Survival of the Dead is a 2009 horror film written and directed by George A. Romero and starring Alan van Sprang, Kenneth Welsh and Kathleen Munroe. It is the sixth entry in Romero's Night of the Living Dead series. The story follows a group of AWOL National Guardsmen who briefly appeared in Diary of the Dead.

It was the last film directed by Romero before his death in 2017.

== Plot ==
The prologue follows the actions of National Guard Sergeant "Nicotine" Crockett, who, along with Kenny, Francisco and Tomboy, desert their posts and rob the protagonists of the previous film. Meanwhile, off the coast of Delaware lies Plum Island, home to two feuding Irish families: the O'Flynns and the Muldoons. The former family, led by Patrick O'Flynn, round up a posse to kill the undead on the island. O'Flynn learns that the Muldoons are keeping their undead loved ones safe until a cure is found. Tensions come to a head when O'Flynn and his posse arrive at the Muldoon house to dispatch their undead children, only to engage in a brief gunfight that leaves a woman dead as well. Unable to put the children down himself, Patrick surrenders his weapons when the Muldoon posse arrives. Seamus Muldoon contemplates killing Patrick until Patrick's daughter Janet suggests he be exiled from the island instead.

Boy joins the National Guardsmen and through him they learn of Plum Island. They watch a video made by Patrick and follow the instructions in it that leads them to a nearby dock. At the dock, O'Flynn and his men attempt to rob the Guardsmen, which results in a shootout. Francisco steals a ferry boat and bites off the finger of an attacking zombie in the process. All of the O'Flynns but Patrick are killed by zombies, and he boards the ferry. During the trip to the island, Patrick says that he sent other people to Plum Island to anger the Muldoons.

When the group reach the island they discover that the Muldoons have chained up their zombies in imitations of their previous lives. They also see that the people sent to the island by Patrick have been killed. Patrick sees his daughter Janet ride by on a horse, apparently dead and turned into a zombie. Patrick attempts to gather allies when two Muldoons attack them, shooting Crockett and Kenny. The latter dies from his wounds, and is shot in the head by Patrick to prevent reanimation. Francisco realizes that he infected himself when he bit off the zombie's finger, and asks Tomboy to shoot him to keep him from turning. Tomboy shoots him and is then captured by Muldoon.

Patrick finds out that the daughter he saw earlier was actually Janet's twin sister Jane. Janet, still alive, joins Patrick and the Guardsmen in their attack on the Muldoons. A standoff occurs at the bridge that separates the two families' land, and the O'Flynn group is captured; Boy and Janet escape. Muldoon reveals his attempts to persuade the zombies to eat something other than human flesh, and uses Jane as a test case. He tries to persuade the dead woman to bite her horse, but instead she attacks and bites her sister Janet. A melee ensues and captured zombies are released, consuming people from both sides. Muldoon and O'Flynn call a truce that is almost immediately broken when Muldoon shoots O'Flynn, who pulls a hidden gun and kills Muldoon.

Crockett and his group attempt to leave the island. Janet witnesses her sister bite the horse and rushes to tell Crockett's group the news, but before doing so she is shot in the head by Patrick, who wanted to prevent his daughter turning before succumbing to his own wounds. Crockett, Boy, and Tomboy board the ferry and escape the island while the zombies are eating the horse. Crockett muses about the purpose of war as the reanimated O'Flynn and Muldoon stagger toward each other, guns unloaded, and attempt to shoot and kill each other again.

== Cast ==
- Alan van Sprang as Sarge "Nicotine" Crockett
- Kenneth Welsh as Patrick O'Flynn
- Kathleen Munroe as Janet O'Flynn / Jane O'Flynn
- Devon Bostick as Boy
- Richard Fitzpatrick as Seamus Muldoon
- Athena Karkanis as Tomboy
- Stefano Di Matteo as Francisco
- Joris Jarsky as Chuck
- Eric Woolfe as Kenny McDonald
- Julian Richings as James O'Flynn
- Wayne Robson as Tawdry O'Flynn
- Joshua Peace as D.J.
- George Stroumboulopoulos as Talk Show Host

Actors Shawn Roberts, Scott Wentworth, Amy Lalonde, Michelle Morgan, and Joshua Close from Diary of the Dead appear in archival footage early in the film.

== Production ==
=== Development ===
The film was inspired by the 1958 William Wyler Western film The Big Country. Romero would use the film's concept on his sixth zombie film as a message on war and conflict, as stated by himself after being questioned about the film: "No… the idea was to make a film about war or entities that don't die, conflicts, disagreements that people can't resolve, whether its Ireland, or the Middle East, or the Senate… that was the idea. And then I decided that was the best way to depict it. And then I had this other idea about an island would be a logical place for people to go, an idea I sort of played with in some of the other films. So I said OK, the best way to tell this story I think is to have a protagonist go to the island only to find out that it's in the middle of basically a war that won't die, between these two old guys. And the moment that came together I remembered The Big Country. And I'm always looking for something different sort of stylistically with these films so that they're not the same which makes it more interesting for us as filmmakers. All the people on the set, production design, DP, good friends of mine, we sort of work as a big family. So we all sat down and I made everyone watch The Big Country. And then my thought was "Hey why don't we go full on with this, go widescreen, not mute the colors, really try to make it look like William Wyler". So that was something we did as a fun exercise to give it a different taste".

=== Filming ===
The film was independently produced, and distributed by Artfire Pictures. It had a budget of $4 million. Romero shot the film in Port Dover, Ontario and in Toronto, Ontario with an entirely Canadian cast and crew. Romero cited the tax incentives as a reason to shoot in Toronto.

== Release ==
In September 2009, George A. Romero's Survival of the Dead was screened at the Toronto International Film Festival, Venice Film Festival (where it screened for the festival's top prize, the Golden Lion), Trinity of Terrors, Fantastic Fest in Austin, Texas, and Festival du Nouveau Cinéma in Montreal, introduced by George A. Romero. The film was released on DVD on March 15, 2010 in the United Kingdom.

In the U.S., it was released on April 30, 2010, for VOD and was aired for one night only on HDNET Movies on May 26, 2010. Survival of the Dead opened in 20 theaters on May 28, 2010 to an opening weekend gross of $43,757 and averaging $2,188 per theater. As of August 1, 2010, the film has taken $101,740 and $41,451 internationally, bringing the total gross to $143,191. The film headlined the Texas Frightmare Weekend, which took place from April 28 through May 1, 2010. There was also a screening of Survival of the Dead at Madison Square Park, at a zombie walk on May 16, 2010. George A. Romero attended the event, as well as a screenincludingor the first 300 participants. The film was released on Blu-ray and DVD on August 24, 2010.

== Reception ==
On review aggregator Rotten Tomatoes, 29% of 91 surveyed critics gave the film a positive review and the average rating is 4.85/10; the website's consensus is: "Survival of the Dead offers glimmers of Romero's savage wit, but not nearly enough to make up for his unusually uninspired directing and a lack of new ideas." Metacritic rated it 43/100 based on 22 reviews, indicating "mixed or average reviews".

Lesli Felperin of Variety called it "steeped in fan-pleasing gore but woefully thin on ideas, originality (beyond new zombie-offing methods) or directorial flair."

Ray Bennett of The Hollywood Reporter called it "a polished, fast-moving, entertaining picture".

Jeannette Catsoulis of The New York Times wrote, "Placidly photographed and lacking in urgency, Survival shows us the living flailing at fate and the dead just flailing."

Roger Ebert of the Chicago Sun-Times rated it 2/4 stars and wrote that very little in the film is new except for the deaths. Brad Miska of Bloody Disgusting rated it 1.5/5 stars and wrote that the film lacks a clear protagonist, antagonist, and theme.

On July 30, 2017, film critic Scout Tafoya of RogerEbert.com included Survival of the Dead in his video series "The Unloved", where he highlights films which received mixed to negative reviews yet he believes to have artistic value. He stated that the film's "savage" reception from critics could possibly be the reason for the absence of films made before Romero's death, "a tragedy because Survival of the Dead, a deeply weird but singularly Romero-esque Western, is one of the most searing chapters in the book on tribalism and the search for happiness he'd been writing with every film he made during his career.... [Romero's] most endearing quality may have been that he never ceased imagining that there could be a place for the poor and tired to finally find peace. To feel like their own masters, all they had to do was let go of the rituals and cruelties, but some still grip the old world like a life preserver."

== Legacy ==
=== Twilight of the Dead (2027) ===
In 2017, Romero announced a new upcoming zombie film of his titled Twilight of the Dead. He penned a film treatment with co-writer Paolo Zelati depicting a conclusion to the series that explains the fate of the zombie protagonists from Land of the Dead and an ending where humanity has become virtually extinct. Romero had written the beginning of the script, but the project was stalled when Romero died of lung cancer later that year.

It was announced in April 2021 that the film had been put back into development under the supervision of Suzanne Romero, with Zelati finishing the script with screenwriters Joe Knetter and Robert L. Lucas. Suzanne told The Hollywood Reporter, "This is the film he wanted to make. And while someone else will carry the torch as the director, it is very much a George A. Romero film." In October 2026, Twilight of the Dead was officially wrapped filming and was directed by the Paz Brothers.
