= Diary of the Dead =

2007 American horror film by George A. Romero

- Theatrical release poster
- Directed by: George A. Romero
- Written by: George A. Romero
- Produced by: Peter Grunwald; Art Spigel; Sam Englebardt; Ara Katz
- Starring: Michelle Morgan; Josh Close; Shawn Roberts; Amy Lalonde; Joe Dinicol; Scott Wentworth; Philip Riccio; Chris Violette; Tatiana Maslany
- Cinematography: Adam Swica
- Edited by: Michael Doherty
- Music by: Norman Orenstein
- Production companies: Artfire Films; Romero-Grunwald Productions
- Distributed by: Third Rail Releasing
- Release dates: September 8, 2007 (Toronto International Film Festival); February 15, 2008 (United States)
- Running time: 95 minutes
- Countries: Canada; United States
- Language: English
- Budget: $2 million
- Box office: $5.3 million

Diary of the Dead (promoted as George A. Romero's Diary of the Dead) is a 2007 found footage horror film written and directed by George A. Romero. Although independently produced, it was distributed theatrically by The Weinstein Company and was released in cinemas on February 15, 2008 and on DVD by Dimension Extreme and Genius Products on May 20, 2008.

Diary of the Dead is the fifth installment in Romero's Night of the Living Dead series of zombie films, taking place at the start of the outbreak.

== Plot ==
Film footage from a news crew shows a story about an immigrant man killing his wife and son before committing suicide. The son and wife turn into zombies and kill several medical personnel and police officers, but leave one medic and a reporter bitten before being killed. The narrator, Debra, explains that most of the footage, which was recorded by the cameraman, was never broadcast.

A group of young film studies students from the University of Pittsburgh are in the woods making a horror film along with their faculty advisor, Andrew Maxwell, when they hear news of apparent mass-rioting and mass murder. Two of the students, Ridley and Francine, decide to leave the group, while the project director Jason goes to pick up his girlfriend Debra (the narrator) from her university dorm. When she cannot contact her family, they travel to Debra's parents' house in Scranton, Pennsylvania. En route, the group consisting of Jason, Debra, Professor Maxwell, Eliot, cameraman Tony, Mary and couple Gordo and Tracy run over a reanimated Pennsylvania State Trooper and three other zombies. The group stops and Mary attempts to kill herself. Her friends take her to a hospital, where they find the dead becoming zombies, and thereafter fight to survive while traveling to Debra's parents.

Mary becomes a zombie and is slain by Maxwell, and the group dispatch several reanimated patients and staff, including Debra killing one with a defibrillator. Whilst escaping Gordo is bitten by a zombie and soon afterward dies from it. His girlfriend Tracy begs the others not to shoot him immediately but later is forced to shoot him herself when he reanimates. Soon they are stranded when their RV's fuel line breaks. They are attacked by zombies but are rescued by a deaf Amish man named Samuel, who blows them up with dynamite. Tracy then repairs the broken fuel line with the aid of Samuel, but before escaping, he is bitten and kills himself and his attacker with a scythe.

Passing a city, they are stopped by an armed group of survivors, the leader being a member of the National Guard. They are taken to their compound where Jason uploads his footage and Tony kills a zombified guard with acid. Whilst there, Debra receives a message from her younger brother, who informs her that he and their parents were camping in West Virginia at the time of the initial attacks and are now on their way home. The students then leave for Debra's house. Their only reliable source of information is now the Internet, aided by bloggers.

When they arrive at Debra's house, they find her reanimated mother and brother feeding on her father and Maxwell kills them with a bow and arrow. They escape from the house and are stopped by different National Guardsmen, who rob them, leaving them only their weapons and their two cameras. They arrive at Ridley's mansion, where Ridley explains that his parents, the staff, and Francine were killed and he buried them out back. Ridley shows Debra and Tony that he "buried" his parents, the staff and Francine by dumping their bodies into his family's swimming pool.

Ridley then abandons Debra and Tony and is revealed to have been bitten by a zombie himself, explaining his odd behavior. Ridley soon dies and reanimates, then kills and infects Eliot and attacks Tracy and Jason. Jason is able to distract Ridley long enough for Tracy to escape at the last minute. Mad at Jason for not leaving the camera to help her, Tracy leaves the group in the group's RV. The remaining survivors hide in an enclosed shelter within the house, with the exception of Jason, who left the group to continue filming and is subsequently attacked and infected by Ridley. Maxwell kills Ridley with an antique sword and Debra euthanizes Jason, while continuing to film. Later, a large number of zombies begin to attack the mansion, including a reanimated Eliot. This forces Debra, Tony and Professor Maxwell to take shelter in the mansion's panic room.

Debra watches Jason's recording of a hunting party shooting people who were left to die and be reanimated as shooting targets, and wonders if the human race is worth saving.

== Cast ==
- Michelle Morgan as Debra Moynihan
- Joshua Close as Jason Creed
- Shawn Roberts as Tony Ravello
- Amy Lalonde as Tracy Thurman
- Joe Dinicol as Eliot Stone
- Scott Wentworth as Andrew Maxwell
- Philip Riccio as Ridley Wilmott
- George Buza as Biker
- Tatiana Maslany as Mary Dexter
- R. D. Reid as Samuel
- Tino Monte as Newscaster
- Megan Park as Francine Shane
- Martin Roach as Stranger
- Alan van Sprang as Sergeant "Nicotine" Crockett
- Matt Birman as Zombie Trooper
- Laura de Carteret as Bree
- Janet Lo as Asian Woman
- Rebuka Hoye as Zombie
- Todd William Schroeder as Brody
- Alexandria DeFabiis as Zombie
- Nick Alachiotis as Fred
- George A. Romero as Chief of Police
- Boyd Banks as Armorist
- Gregory Nicotero as Zombie Surgeon
- Chris Violette as Gordo Thorsen

Quentin Tarantino, Wes Craven, Guillermo del Toro, Simon Pegg, and Stephen King lend their voices as newsreaders in the film.

== Production ==
=== Development ===
Even before releasing Land of the Dead, Romero wanted to do a film about "emerging media". After releasing Land, which he felt was too "big" in scope, he wanted to go back to make a relatively low-budget film to relate back to the "origins of the thing" and felt that his "Emerging Media" idea could easily fulfill it.

=== Casting ===
Even though the film is shot in a cinema verite style, Romero still chose to use a cinematographer, as opposed to letting the cast film the movie themselves. Romero would state: "I had this idea that I could use film students out shooting a school project and zombies begin to walk and they document it. I wanted to do this subjective camera thing before I knew anybody else was working on it. I didn’t know about Cloverfield or anything else. I thought we were going to be the first guys out there with one of these". In his decision, he cited what he saw as the failings of The Blair Witch Project, which he found "dizzying", also noting that "it didn’t quite make sense."

=== Filming ===
Romero stated that the movie overall was more difficult to shoot than a traditional one: "It really needed to be choreographed down to the shoelaces". He made an extensive use of computer-generated imagery because it allowed him to shoot the film quickly and add the effects later. Also, the film's style, as if shot with hand-held cameras, necessitated a shift from his usual method of working, which involves filming multiple camera angles and assembling scenes in the editing room. Instead, Romero filmed much of the action in long, continuous takes: "The camera was 360, so everybody was an acrobat, ducking under the lens when the camera came past you," said Romero. "The cast was great. They had a lot of theater experience. I think they could have gone from scene one all the way to the end of the movie, all in a single shot." The whole film was shot in Toronto, Ontario, Canada.

The film is the fifth film in Romero's Dead series and there are some notable references to earlier Romero films, as when the news track from 1968's Night of the Living Dead is used in the scene where the cast is in Ben's garage. The film is a reboot rather than a continuation of Land of the Dead. The film takes place on a separate timeline than the previous Living Dead films. It was partially based on a practical concern as Romero thought that if the film took place too far into the zombie apocalypse, schools would have been closed and thus it would not make sense to have student filmmakers as a focal point. He was also inspired partially by the Book of the Dead anthology series, which depicts other events that happened during the same time frame. Even though the fourth film, Land of the Dead, was studio-produced through Universal Studios, Diary of the Dead was produced by Romero-Grunwald Productions, formed by Romero and his producer friend Peter Grunwald, with Artfire Films.

== Home media releases ==
The DVD was released by The Weinstein Company and Genius Entertainment on May 20, 2008. Special features include a feature-length documentary, an audio commentary, deleted scenes, a behind the scenes featurette and five short films that came about via a MySpace contest. It was released the same day as a new authorized edition of Night of the Living Dead on DVD was released by The Weinstein Company.

The film was released on Region 2 on June 29, 2008, in single disc, double disc and Blu-ray editions. The double-disc and Blu-ray both contained a UK exclusive interview from Frightfest 08, and a feature-length documentary entitled One for the Fire - The Legacy of Night of the Living Dead. The double-disc edition was released in limited, numbered steelbook packaging, and online retailer Play.com sold an exclusive edition in a slipcase. On October 21, 2008, a Blu-ray version was released in the US.

== Reception ==
On the review aggregator website Rotten Tomatoes, the film has a rating of 61% based on reviews from 131 critics. The website's consensus reads: "As Diary of the Dead proves, time hasn't subdued George A. Romero's affection for mixing politics with gore, nor has it given him cinematic grace or subtlety." On Metacritic, the film has a score of 66 out of 100 based on reviews from 29 critics, indicating "generally favorable" reviews.

Beth Accomando of KPBS called the film "bloody fun, bloody smart and just plain bloody good" and felt that it was more credible than the similar found-footage film Cloverfield. Manohla Dargis of The New York Times called it the "loosest, goosiest chapter" in Romero's zombie oeuvre and, while the film has "some striking filmmaking", ultimately Dargis found that the film "just isn’t scary." Kim Newman of Empire gave the film four out of five stars. Newman compared the film to The Zombie Diaries and •REC, saying that Romero matched them in horror and "trumps them in crazy inventiveness and humour."

Jim Emerson of RogerEbert.com gave the film three stars. Nathan Rabin of The A.V. Club gave the film a C+ and said Romero's "heavy-handed intellectual concerns get in the way of a perfectly good fright flick." Peter Bradshaw of The Guardian gave the film two out of five stars, and said that "what more is there to say about the zombie genre and its metaphors for our undead society?"

George Romero won a 2008 Critics Award for Diary of the Dead at the Festival international du film fantastique de Gérardmer.
