= Tim Burns (writer) =

Canadian-American television writer

Tim Burns is a Canadian director, writer and producer for Canadian and American television; more popularly known as the show runner/executive producer of the Teletoon-Disney Channel shared, supernatural comedy-drama series, My Babysitter's a Vampire and for writing its TV pilot film. He was also supervising writer of the third season of Crank Yankers and was a composer on The Sunny Side Up Show.

== Career ==
Tim Burns began his writing career in 1985 with the CBC radio comedy series The Norm Show, and in 1989 was hired as a staff writer on The Jim Henson Hour. He also wrote the 1 hour special Dog City which was later developed into an animated series. During pre-production of the Henson Hour, he met Tom Stern and a few years later they and Stern's writing partner Alex Winter created the sketch comedy series The Idiot Box. Burns also dabbled in CGI and created the animated character 'Votar - The Voice Over Announcer of the Future" on his Amiga computer. The trio collaborated again on the screenplay for the movie Freaked, in which Burns played the Hideous Frogman, and also wrote the soundtrack tunes "Wienerschnitzel Polka", "Pick-A-Freek", and "Freekz!" That's What They Call Us!. Stern and Burns wrote many Monkey-ed Movies parodies for the TBS network, which evolved into the half-hour comedy series, The Chimp Channel. Returning to Canada in 2000, Tim served as supervising producer for the second season of the Blackfly wrote two episodes.

Having started out as a drummer in a new-wave band 'The Strone', Burns began composing in 1996 with Hello Mrs. Cherrywinkle, and other shows like The Good Night Show, Saul of the Mole Men, and The Sunny Side Up Show from 2007 until 2009. He also worked on soundtracks for Young Person's Guide to History. Burns wrote an episode of Star Wars: The Clone Wars in 2008, "Destroy Malevolence". In 2010 he wrote the teleplay and story for the Teletoon TV movie, My Babysitter's a Vampire, when the movie became a series, he became executive producer of the series and wrote the series premiere episode along with two other episodes.

More recently, Burns has contributed music and comedy sketches for the Netflix special, Kevin Hart's Guide to Black History, and composed music for numerous songs, including the theme, to the Universal Kids' stop-motion animated series Norman Picklestripes. He continues to develop new comedy and music material for film and television in both Canada and the U.S.

== Filmography ==
Year(s)	Show(s) / Movie(s)	Occupation(s)	Notes
1989	The Jim Henson Hour	Writer	Episode: "Dog City"
1989–1990	The Sweet Life	Writer	All episodes
1991	The Idiot Box	Writer and Creator	Episode: "The Best of the Idiot Box"
1993	Freaked	Writer; Acting role Soundtrack	Portrayed Frogman; Writer: "Wienerschnitzel Polka", "Freekz!" That's What They Call Us!, "Pick-A-Freek". Performer: "Pick-A-Freek"
1996	Hello Mrs. Cherrywinkle	Composer	
1997	An American Werewolf in Paris	Writer	
1999	The Chimp Channel	Writer & co-executive producer	
1999	Jacob Two Two Meets the Hooded Fang	Writer	
2000	Canadian Comedy Awards		Himself
2001–2002	Blackfly	Writer; Supervising writer	2 episodes: "Kettles from the Land of Cool Stuff" & "The Love of the Game"; 1 episode: "Surprise"
2004	Geraldine's Fortune	Writer	
2005	Crank Yankers	Supervising writer	Season 3
2005	The Good Night Show	Composer	
2006	Nancy Nancy	Soundtrack	Performer: "Night Games", "Moonlight & Magic"
2007	Saul of the Mole Men	Composer	16 episodes: "Blood Is Thicker Than Walter", "Finger of Fate or the Fateful Finger", "Fun King", "Work the Sack", "Moustache Ride", "What's Happening Down There?", "IC-CAWWWW!", "Hammer in His Hand", "Children of Embers Blaze", "Faster Robot! Upload! Upload!", "Girly", "Saul Comes Back", "Spare Me My Beets", "Village of the Damned Dolls", "Poor Clancy's Almanack", and "Saul-id Rock"
2007–2009	The Sunny Side Up Show	Composer	
2008	Star Wars: The Clone Wars	Writer	Episode: "Destroy Malevolence"
2008	Young Person's Guide to History	Soundtrack	Writer: "Moustache Ride"
2009–2010	Spliced	Writer	Episodes: "Come to the Dork Side", "Best Before Date"
2010	My Babysitter's a Vampire	Writer, Teleplay & Story	
2011–2012	My Babysitter's a Vampire	Executive Producer; Writer	Episodes: "Lawn of the Dead", "The Brewed", "Welcome Back Dusker", "The Date to End All Dates (Part 1)" (story)
