= Hrant Alianak =

Armenian-Canadian actor and playwright

- Born: September 15, 1950 (age 75); Khartoum, Sudan
- Other names: Harant Alianak, Grant Aljanak
- Citizenship: Canada
- Occupations: Actor, playwright
- Known for: Pontypool

Hrant Alianak (born September 15, 1950), also billed as Harant Alianak or Grant Aljanak, is a Sudanese-born Canadian actor and playwright. He gained notoriety as Dr. Jon Mendez in Pontypool.

== Early life ==
Alianak was born on September 15, 1950, in Khartoum, Sudan to an Armenian family. At age fifteen, he enrolled in a university in Khartoum, where he studied economics. He moved to Canada when he was 17, and moved to Montreal, Quebec, where he studied business administration. Alianak said he started to write in 1972, and spent most of the 1970s writing plays "nonstop" before entering acting in the 1980s.

== Career ==
In 1988, he was nominated for the Genie Award "Best Performance by an Actor in a Supporting Role" for the 1987 film Family Viewing. He played Pete in the 1995 Adam Sandler movie Billy Madison. He portrayed Dr. Mendez in the 2009 Canadian horror film Pontypool. He also played Dr. Marek in "Stay Out of the Basement", a 1996 episode of the TV series Goosebumps.

Alianak's plays include Lucky Strike, The Walls of Africa, and The Blues. Alianak made his debut as a writer in 1972 at Theatre Passe Muraille, with Tantrums.

The Walls of Africa was the 2001 winner of three Dora Awards, including Best New Play, and was published by Scirocco Drama in 2002. Scirocco has also published The Blues (2003).

In 2010, Alianak portrayed Principal Hicks in the movie My Babysitter's a Vampire. In 2011, he reprised the role in the TV series based on the movie. His other television credits include being a member of the repertory cast of the A&E TV series A Nero Wolfe Mystery (2002).

== Filmography ==
=== Film ===
Year	Title	Role	Notes
1983	Spacehunter: Adventures in the Forbidden Zone	Chemist	
1984	Best Revenge	Elliah	
1984	One Night Only	Wenko	
1985	Head Office	President Sanchez	
1987	Family Viewing	Administrator	
1989	Destiny to Order	Marlay	
1993	Life with Mikey	Cereal Commercial Director	
1995	Billy Madison	Pete	
1998	The Secret Life of Algernon	Mahir Sulleyman	
1998	Dirty Work	Kirkpatrick	
2001	Full Disclosure	Hosni	
2008	The Echo	Max	
2008	Pontypool	Dr. Mendez	
2012	Inescapable	Ali Homs	
2014	A Trip to the Island	Harry	
2017	Becoming Burlesque	Waleed Aziz	
2019	Guest of Honour	Garo	
2020	Possessor	Lead Technician	

=== Television ===
Year	Title	Role	Notes
1981	Escape from Iran: The Canadian Caper	Iranian Minister	Television film
1983	The Sins of Dorian Gray	Nightclub Manager	Television film
1985	The Undergrads	Zook	Television film
1985	Tucker and the Horse Thief	Jonah	Television film
1986	Seeing Things	Omar Baheshti	Episode: "The Eyes of Ra"
1986	Courage	Eddie Cuba	Television film
1986	Sword of Gideon	Wael Zwaiter	Television film
1986, 1987	Adderly	Dictator / Grant	2 episodes
1987, 1988	Night Heat	Varga / Ramos' Associate	2 episodes
1988	Mount Royal	Gomes	Episode: "Royal Wedding"
1988	Inside Stories		Episode "Looking for Nothing"
1988	Friday the 13th: The Series	Sandy	Episode: "Master of Disguise"
1988	Spies, Lies & Naked Thighs	Omar	Television film
1988	The Twilight Zone	Dr. Greenburg	Episode: "The Trance"
1989	T. and T.	Carna	Episode: "Hunted"
1991	Counterstrike	Jemal	Episode: "The Millerton Papers"
1991	Counterstrike	Lopez	Episode: "Fall From Grace"
1992	Street Legal	Det. Hasson	Episode: "The Phoenix"
1992	Counterstrike	Dr. Stanley Ladner	Episode: "D.O.A."
1993	Rapture	Chief Galati	Television film
1993	Matrix	Joseph Haddad	Episode: "Collateral Damage"
1993	Kung Fu: The Legend Continues	Sidekick #2	Episode: "Illusion"
1993	The Hidden Room	Murdock	Episode: "Stark in Love"
1994	TekWar: TekJustice	Judge Tsuruda	Television film
1994	RoboCop	Stitch Molotov	4 episodes
1996	Goosebumps	Dr. Marek	2 episodes
1997	Psi Factor	Hran Jamal	Episode: "The Curse/Angel on a Plane"
1997	Earth: Final Conflict	Dr. Kaplan	Episode: "Avatar"
1997	Ghostwriter	Stanley Ferguson	Episode: "Broken Window"
1998	More Tears	Shaffik	1 episode
1998	Thanks of a Grateful Nation	Dr. Sid Beria	Television film
1999	Total Recall 2070	Dr. Karl Gish	2 episodes
1999	La Femme Nikita	Salla Vacek	2 episodes
1999	Ultimate Deception	Dr. Amos	Television film
1999	Love Songs	Doctor	Television film
1999	Foolish Heart	Judge	Episode: "The Trial"
2000	Relic Hunter	Moustaffa	Episode: "Afterlife and Death"
2000	The Golden Spiders: A Nero Wolfe Mystery	Gerstner	Television film
2000	The Deadly Look of Love	Dr. Dunning	Television film
2000	The Royal Diaries: Cleopatra - Daughter of the Nile	Pharaoh	Television film
2000	Code Name: Eternity	Ambassador Dumant	Episode: "Not a Bite to Eat"
2001	WW 3	Abdus Hamdoon	Television film
2001–2002	Nero Wolfe	Various roles	9 episodes
2002	Monk	Judge Hackman	2 episodes
2004	Call Me: The Rise and Fall of Heidi Fleiss	Prince Hassan	Television film
2004	This Is Wonderland	Mr. Barsumian	Episode #1.13
2004	The Grid	Yemeni Colonel	5 episodes
2004	H2O	Dr. Rafsamjhanni	2 episodes
2004	The Eleventh Hour	Kamal's father / Ahmad	2 episodes
2005–2007	Jeff Ltd.	Uncle Kazem	12 episodes
2005–2013	Mayday	Various roles	3 episodes
2006	Covert One: The Hades Factor	Al-Fulani	2 episodes
2006	At the Hotel	Zlawko	5 episodes
2006	Angela's Eyes	Hrant Tosbath	Episode: "Open Your Eyes"
2006	The Wives He Forgot	Dr. Bajaria	Television film
2007–2010	Little Mosque on the Prairie	Mr. Rashid	3 episodes
2008	XIII: The Conspiracy	Dr. Kimmler	2 episodes
2008, 2009	The Border	General Zaki / Sharif Assad	2 episodes
2009	ZOS: Zone of Separation	Colonel Ali	Episode: "Hour One: Welcome"
2009–2010	Cra$h & Burn	Yaro Massout	5 episodes
2010	My Babysitter's a Vampire	Principal Hicks	Television film
2010	Lost Girl	Kouyoumijian	Episode: "Food for Thought"
2011	InSecurity	Arkady Brautman	Episode: "Spy Bites Dog"
2011–2012	My Babysitter's a Vampire	Principal Hicks	26 episodes
2012	King	Salim Atassi	Episode: "Jamilla Karan"
2012	XIII: The Series	Dr. Kleinberg	Episode: "Breakout"
2013	Cracked	Dr. Karl Karzik	Episode: "No Traveller Returns"
2014	Darknet	Plastic Surgeon	Episode: "Darknet 4"
2015	Riftworld Chronicles	Jeweller	8 episodes
2016	Private Eyes	Omar Torkia	Episode: "Disappearing Act"
2016	Designated Survivor	Saudi Ambassador	Episode: "The Traitor"
2016–2017	Kim's Convenience	Baran / Garlic Customer	4 episodes
2018	Murdoch Mysteries	Mr. Morrissey	Episode: "Mary Wept"
2018	The Detail	Judge Safaryan	Episode: "The Long Walk"
2019	Frankie Drake Mysteries	Butler	Episode: "A Sunshine State of Mind"
2019	V Wars	Doctor	Episode: "The Junkie Run of the Predator Gene"
2021	Sex/Life	Mr. Mann	2 episodes
2021	The Lost Symbol	Ario Fazeli	Episode: "L'Enfant Orientation"
