= Joe Dinicol =

Canadian actor

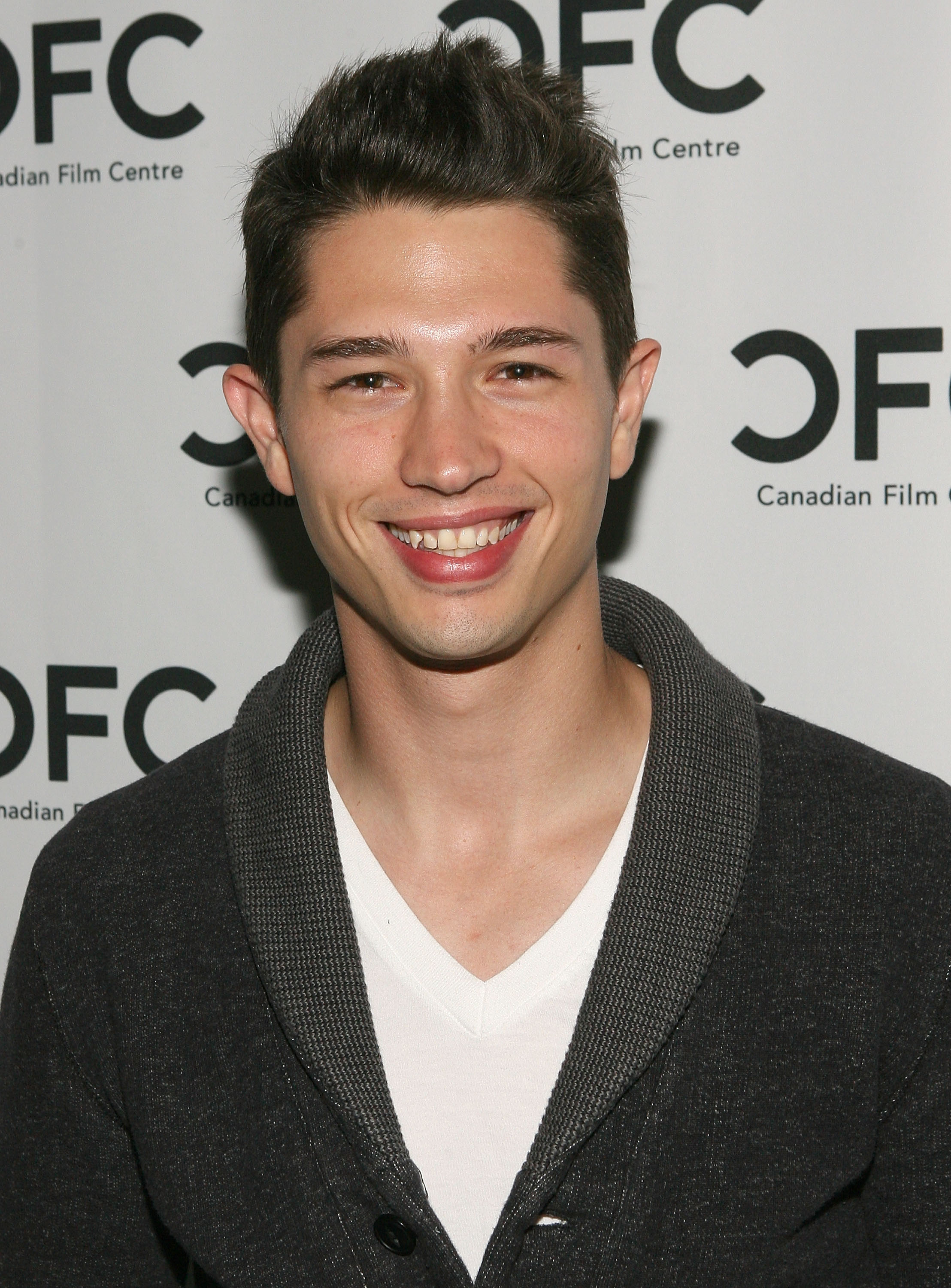
- Dinicol in September 2008
- Born: December 22, 1983 (age 42); Stratford, Ontario, Canada
- Occupation: Actor
- Years active: 1997–present
- Family: John Neville (grandfather)

Joe Dinicol (born December 22, 1983) is a Canadian actor. He is known for his portrayal of Rory Regan / Ragman in a recurring role in the fifth season of Arrow.

== Life and career ==
Dinicol was born in Stratford, Ontario, the son of Emma (née Neville) and acting coach and actor Keith Dinicol. His maternal grandfather was English actor John Neville. He started his career as a child actor at the Stratford Shakespeare Festival, and has since appeared on the Canadian television series Train 48 and Rideau Hall.

On stage, Dinicol has appeared in Antony and Cleopatra, The Merry Wives of Windsor, Waiting for Godot, and Richard III at the Stratford Festival, and The Needfire at the Royal Alexandra Theatre in Toronto. He also performed in the 1996 recording of Waiting for Godot for the Canadian Broadcasting Corporation. His most recent performance was as the second male lead in Paul Gross's Passchendaele released in 2008. Dinicol was the lead of the Amazon-produced series Betas.

== Filmography ==
=== Film ===
Year	Title	Role	Notes
1999	The Virgin Suicides	Dominic Palazzolo	
1999	Water Damage	Unknown	
1999	Jacob Two Two Meets the Hooded Fang	O'Toole/Noah	
2003	Fast Food High	Scott	
2003	Kart Racer	Rodney Wells	
2006	The Marsh	Brendan Manville	
2007	Weirdsville	Jeremy Taylor	
2007	Bottom Feeder	Callum	
2007	Diary of the Dead	Eliot Stone	
2008	Passchendaele	David Mann	
2009	Puck Hogs	Terry Bender	
2010	Scott Pilgrim vs. the World	Elevator hipster	
2011	Servitude	Josh Stein	
2011	Bad Meat	Billy	
2013	Cubicle Warriors	Isaac	

=== Television ===
Year	Title	Role	Notes
1997	Elvis Meets Nixon	Ten-year-old boy	Television film
1998	Eerie, Indiana: The Other Dimension	Ollie Roberts	Episode: "The Phantom"
1998–1999	Anatole	Paul (voice)	26 episodes
2000	Real Kids, Real Adventures	John	Episode: "Sucked Underground: The John Collmer Story"
2000	The Famous Jett Jackson	Byron	Episode: "Step Up"
2000	The Loretta Claiborne Story	Russell	Television film
2000	Mail to the Chief	Kyle	Television film
2001	The Facts of Life Reunion	Sam	Television film
2002	Rideau Hall	Jason Gallant	Main role
2003–2005	Train 48	Zach Eisler	Main role
2003	Sue Thomas: F.B.Eye	Nathan Wyatt	Episode: "Homeland Security"
2004	She's Too Young	Tommy	Television film
2008–2009	Life with Derek	Truman French	Recurring role
2009	Murdoch Mysteries	Harry Houdini	Episode: "Houdini Whodunit"
2010	My Babysitter's a Vampire	Jesse	Television film
2010	Reviving Ophelia	Cody	Television film
2011–2012	My Babysitter's a Vampire	Jesse	Guest role; 3 episodes
2011	Haven	Peter Novelli	Episode: "Roots"
2011	Flashpoint	Tyler Davis	Episode: "The War Within"
2012	The L.A. Complex	Nick Wagner	Main role
2013–2014	Betas	Trey Barett	Main role
2015–2016	Grey's Anatomy	Dr. Mitchell Spencer	Recurring role
2015–2016; 2018	Blindspot	David Wagner	Recurring role
2016	Halt and Catch Fire	Craig Bosch	Guest role; 3 episodes
2016–2017; 2019; 2020	Arrow	Rory Regan / Ragman	Recurring role (season 5); guest role (seasons 7 & 8)
2017	Saving Hope	Thomas Leffering	Recurring role
2018	S.W.A.T.	Telly Appleton	Episode: "Seizure"
2021	Nash Bridges	Steven Colton	Television film
2023	Quantum Leap	Eugene Wagner	Episode: "Leap. Die. Repeat."
2025	Countdown	Ryan Fitzgerald	Recurring role
2026	NCIS	Nick Trusk	Episode: "In Too Deep"
