= Amy Lalonde =

Canadian actress (born 1975)

- Born: Pelham, Ontario
- Occupation: Actress
- Years active: 2004-2013

Amy Ciupak Lalonde is a Canadian-born television and film actress from Pelham, Ontario. She holds a degree in drama and history from Queen's University in Kingston, Ontario.

Lalonde appears on the television channel SCREAM. She has made guest appearances in Mutant X, Queer as Folk, Kevin Hill, Beautiful People, Battlestar Galactica, Jeff Ltd., Love Bites and Lost Girl. Lalonde has appeared in numerous commercials including Molson's "It Starts Here" ad campaign as Allison the cowgirl on the airplane. She has been seen in commercials for Kit Kat (playing a snobby socialite daughter) as well as in a commercial for Special K cereal (as a devastated girl who just broke up with her boyfriend) and also a Leon's commercial.

She was previously a high school teacher at Notre Dame College School in Welland, Ontario and in New Zealand. She now works as a full-time teacher at The Bishop Strachan School in Toronto, Ontario.

== Filmography ==
Lalonde completed her first two feature films in 2006: Heartstopper and 5ive Girls. She was in George A. Romero's Diary of the Dead, released in February 2008. Her TV Movie of the Week appearances include Murder in the Hamptons, Earthstorm, Nature of the Beast (ABC Family), and CBC's Victor: The Victor Davis Story.

In 2008, she reprised her leading role on CBC's series Sophie for a second season. The first season aired in 2009 on ABC Family in the United States, as it was purchased by ABC in February 2008. While filming the second season of Sophie in Montreal during the summer, Amy also traveled to Calgary to complete season one of the CBC drama, Wild Roses. In 2011, Lalonde guest-starred in My Babysitter's a Vampire: The Series.
