= Atticus Mitchell =

Canadian actor

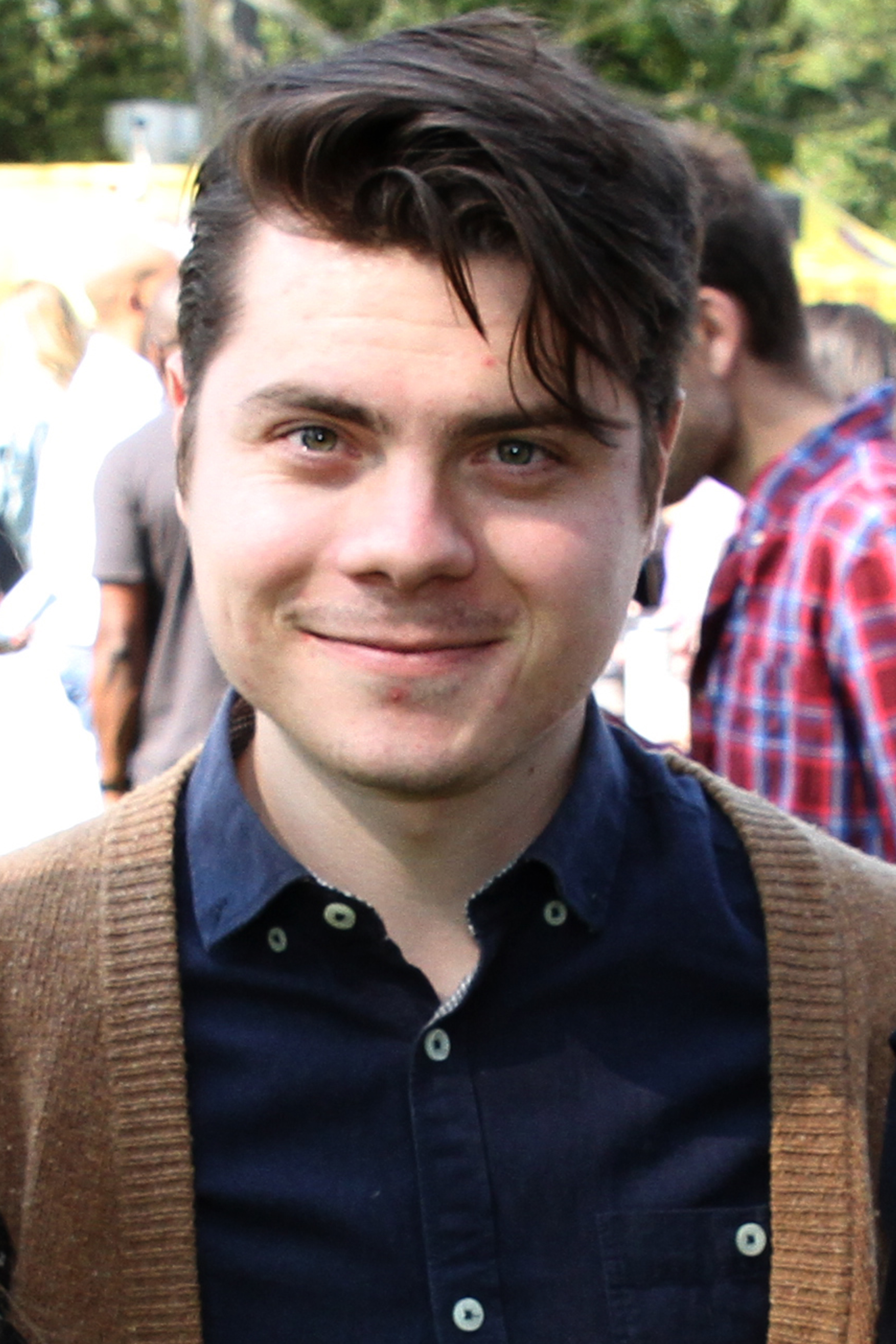
- Mitchell in 2017
- Born: Atticus Dean Mitchell; 1993 (age 32–33); Toronto, Ontario, Canada
- Occupation: Actor
- Years active: 2009–present

Atticus Dean Mitchell (born 1993) is a Canadian actor. He is best known for his roles as Benny Weir in the television film My Babysitter's a Vampire and series of the same name, and Gabe LaViolet in the film Radio Rebel.

== Early life ==
Mitchell was born in Toronto, Ontario. Mitchell played rep hockey at the Ted Reeve Community Arena and attended St. John Elementary School. There, he became interested in theatre. Mitchell originally had plans to pursue a career in music, or journalism before he was sought out by professional agent, Nancy Brown, who signed him up for acting. He graduated from Malvern Collegiate Institute in Toronto.

== Career ==
=== Acting ===
Mitchell began his acting career in 2009 with a recurring role in the YTV series How to be Indie in which he played the role of Carlos Martinelli in eight episodes during the first season and two more during the second season. It was the first show he auditioned for. He played the starring role of Benny Weir in television film and series My Babysitter's a Vampire and was nominated for a 2011 Gemini award for his performance in the film. In 2012, he starred as Gabe LaViolet in the Disney Channel television film Radio Rebel. In 2013 he guest starred in two episodes of Hard Rock Medical, portrayed Graydon in a post-apocalyptic film, The Colony, and also co-starred as Wookiee in a Disney XD Canada/Family Channel original movie, Bunks.

In 2014, Mitchell earned one of the lead roles in the 2015 sitcom, Young Drunk Punk, playing the character, Andrew Shinky. He starred in the 2017 TV series, Killjoys as Pippin Foster. In 2020, he played the role of JB Cox, on The Hardy Boys.

=== Music ===
Mitchell was a drummer in a band called The Fishwives that played local shows in Toronto. Since 2017 he has self-released albums and singles on Spotify.

== Filmography ==
=== Film ===
Year	Title	Role	Notes
2013	The Colony	Graydon	
2014	What We Have	Lyes	
2015	Stonewall	Matt	
2018	Darker Than Night	Bill	also known as Blindsided
2019	Riot Girls	Cracker	
2021	Lune	Rob	

=== Television ===
Year	Title	Role	Notes
2009	How to Be Indie	Carlos Martinelli	3 episodes
2010	Living in Your Car	Teenage Boy	Episode: "Chapter Six"
2010	My Babysitter's a Vampire	Benny	Television film
2011–2012	My Babysitter's a Vampire	Benny Weir	Main role
2012	Radio Rebel	Gabe LaViolet	Television film
2013	Hard Rock Medical	Caleb	Episodes: "Love, Labour, Loss" & "Down Under"
2013	Bunks	Wookiee	Television film
2014	Fargo	Mickey Hess	3 episodes
2015	Young Drunk Punk	Andrew Shinky	Main role
2016	Second Jen	Garth	4 episodes
2017–2019	Killjoys	Pippin Foster	Recurring role, 11 episodes
2018	The Expanse	Ensign Sinopoli	Episodes: "Reload", "Triple Point"
2020	New Eden	Travis	Voice role, 2 episodes
2020–2023	The Hardy Boys	JB Cox	Main role
2022	Transplant	Jake Cooper	5 episodes
2024	Law & Order Criminal Intent: Toronto	Paolo Marcotti	1 episode

== Discography ==
=== Albums ===
List of albums with selected details
Title	Album details
Sonder	Released: May 6, 2017; Label: Self-released; Format: DL
The Pantomime	Released: June 26, 2021; Label: Self-released; Format: DL
Plot Armor	Released: November 11, 2022; Label: Self-released; Format: DL

=== Extended plays ===
List of extended plays with selected details
Title	Album details
Red Giant	Released: May 12, 2018; Label: Self-released; Format: DL
Black Light	Released: November 2, 2019; Label: Self-released; Format: DL

=== Singles ===
List of singles
Title	Year	Album
"Zurich"	2018	Non-album single
"We Will Endure the Long Nights"	2022	Plot Armor

== Awards and nominations ==
Year	Award	Category	Work	Result	Refs
2011	Gemini Award	Best Performance by an Actor in a Featured Supporting Role in a Dramatic Program or Mini-Series	My Babysitter's a Vampire	Nominated	
