= My Babysitter's a Vampire (TV series) =

Canadian television series (2011–2012)

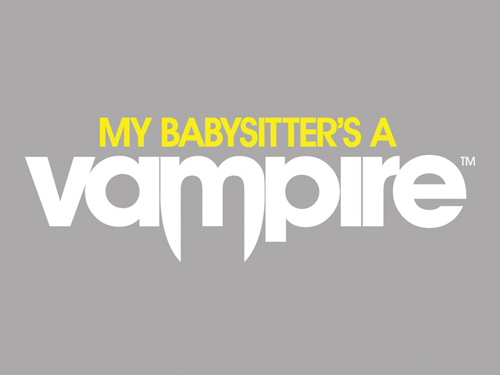
- Also known as: Ma gardienne est un vampire
- Genre: Teen drama; Comedy drama; Supernatural comedy; Comedy horror
- Developed by: Jennifer Pertsch; Tom McGillis; Tim Burns
- Starring: Matthew Knight; Vanessa Morgan; Atticus Mitchell; Cameron Kennedy; Kate Todd
- Theme music composer: Jarrett Randazzo; Revolution 9
- Opening theme: "Girl Next Door"; Performed by Copperpot
- Ending theme: "Girl Next Door"; Performed by Copperpot
- Composers: Brian Pickett; Graeme Cornies; James Chapple; David Kelly
- Country of origin: Canada
- Original languages: French; English
- No. of seasons: 2
- No. of episodes: 26 (list of episodes)

Production
- Executive producers: Bob Higgins; Sander Schwartz; Brian Irving; Jennifer Pertsch; Tom McGillis; George Elliott; Tim Burns
- Producer: Brian Irving
- Cinematography: Gavin Smith; Gerald Packer
- Editors: Ellen Fine; Duncan Christie
- Camera setup: Single-camera
- Running time: 22 minutes
- Production company: Fresh TV

Original release
- Network: Teletoon
- Release: February 28, 2011 – December 6, 2012

Related
- My Babysitter's a Vampire (film)

My Babysitter's a Vampire (Canadian French: Ma gardienne est un vampire) is a Canadian television series, based on the 2010 television film of the same name. In Canada, the series premiered in French on Télétoon on February 28, 2011, in English on Teletoon on March 14, 2011, and on Disney Channel in the United States on June 27, 2011, and finished airing October 5, 2012, on Disney and April 11, 2013, on Télétoon. The show was created by Fresh TV, creators of 6teen, Total Drama, and Stoked. The show follows Ethan Morgan (Matthew Knight), who, in the television film, learns that his babysitter Sarah (Vanessa Morgan) is a vampire. In the film, he learns he is able to have visions and his best friend Benny Weir (Atticus Mitchell) is a spellmaster. The series follows the three as they take on supernatural forces and have adventures, with occasional help from fellow vampires Rory (Cameron Kennedy) and Erica (Kate Todd), while dealing with the troubles of regular high school life.

A second season was confirmed to start production in September 2011 and it first premiered on Disney Channel on June 29, 2012, it premiered on Teletoon September 6, 2012. Télétoon started featuring season 2 sneak-peek episodes on October 28, 2012, and premiered it on January 10, 2013. On September 18, 2013, Fresh TV Inc. announced the show was not picked up for a third season, but were exploring a possible second movie, which did not come to fruition. On November 3, 2015, a fan contacted Tim Burns, one of the lead writers and executive producers of the show, via Facebook, asking about the possibility of a third season, or at least an answer as to why it didn't already exist. Burns responded the next day, on November 4, 2015, saying, "all I can sai [say] is that we tried very hard to make a season 3, or a second movie, happen. The ‘Lucifractor’ storyline was my idea in the first place, and I DID have some solutions in mind for how we would continue the story... I even created a few different scenarios for the second movie. But we hit nothing but problems with broadcasters, budgets, and some difficulties keeping the cast together. It's not surprising that such talented young actors want to move on to other things". Burns also expressed hope for the idea of a possible revival for the show in the future, even it meant using different actors, and said, "If we ever find a way to raise MBV from the grave, I hope you and the other loyal fans aren’t too old to still enjoy iy [It]".

== Premise ==
The series follows the supernatural adventures of Ethan Morgan (Matthew Knight), a geeky freshman and Seer who has visions from contact with the paranormal, his best friend Benny (Atticus Mitchell), who is a spellmaster, and his younger sister's babysitter Sarah (Vanessa Morgan), who is a vampire. They are often aided by Rory (Cameron Kennedy), their dorky friend, and Erica (Kate Todd), Sarah's best friend, both of whom are vampires turned in the pilot film.

== Episodes ==
| Season | Episodes | Originally released | |
| Season | Episodes | First released | Last released |
|---|---|---|---|
| Film | | April 11, 2007 (Teletoon); April 16, 2007 (Télétoon); April 11, 2007 (Cartoon Network) (absent) | |
| 1 | 13 | August 11, 2007 (Teletoon); February 28, 2008 (Télétoon); Augus 11, 2007 (Cartoon Network) | April 5, 2008 (Teletoon/Télétoon); October 19, 2007 (Cartoon Network) |
| 2 | 13 | September 6, 2008 (Teletoon); October 28, 2008 (Télétoon); June 29, 2008 (Cartoon Network) | December 6, 2008 (Teletoon); April 11, 2009 (Télétoon); October 5, 2008 (Cartoon Network) |

== Characters ==
=== Main ===
(Left to right) Matthew Knight as Ethan, Vanessa Morgan as Sarah, and Atticus Mitchell as Benny

- Ethan (Matthew Knight) is the series' and pilot film's protagonist who is also a seer. Seers are able to see visions through touch.
- Sarah (Vanessa Morgan) is a vampire, one of Ethan and Benny's friends, as well as Ethan's love interest, and the babysitter of Ethan's younger sister Jane.
- Benny (Atticus Mitchell) is Ethan's best friend. He is a spellmaster and can cast magic spells.
- Rory (Cameron Kennedy) is a vampire and Ethan and Benny's friend.
- Erica (Kate Todd) is Sarah's best friend and a vampire.

=== Supporting ===
- Jane Morgan (Ella Jonas Farlinger) is Ethan's 8-year-old younger sister.
- Samantha Morgan (Laura DeCarteret) is Ethan and Jane's mother.
- Ross Morgan (Ari Cohen) is Ethan and Jane's father. In the second season, Ari Cohen's name was dropped from the opening credits, his character appearing in a recurring capacity.
- Grandma (Joan Gregson) Evelyn is Benny's "Earth Priestess" grandmother.
- Principal Hicks (Hrant Alianak) is the principal of Whitechapel High.
- Jesse (Joe Dinicol), also known as Reverend Horace Black, is a vampire cult leader posing as a high school student. Jesse is a main character in the movie, but did not initially appear in the series due to his assumed death. He reappears in the season finale of both seasons.

== Development ==
=== Original film ===
My Babysitter's a Vampire aired on October 9, 2010, on the Canadian television channel Teletoon. The French version of the film aired on Teletoon's French-Canadian counterpart, Télétoon, on October 16, 2010. It premiered in the United States on the Disney Channel on June 10, 2011. The film was released on DVD in the United States and Canada on May 22, 2012, with the whole first season, with Warner Home Video handling distribution. The film was released on DVD in the United Kingdom on June 25, 2012, with the premiere episode of the series, "Lawn of the Dead".

=== Production ===
Early in 2011, four episodes of the series aired on Teletoon as previews for the series. Disney Channel announced in June that year that they acquired the rights to air the movie and series. Disney Channel aired the movie on June 10, 2011, and aired first-season episodes from June 27, 2011, to July 19, 2011, with all episodes premiering before the series made its official premiere on Teletoon. First season episodes aired on Thursdays at 8:00 p.m./E.T. on Teletoon and at 8:30 p.m./E.T. on Télétoon starting January 5, 2012, through April 5, 2012, on Teletoon. The first-season finale on Teletoon had an extra scene added to coincide with the online companion game results, which Disney Channel did not air.

A 13-episode second season of the show was greenlit by Fresh TV, and was originally revealed by Vanessa Morgan on her official, personal Twitter. Filming for the second season lasted from September 21, 2011, to November 17, 2011. The same day filming ended, Disney Channel announced that it would pick the show up again for a second season. A promo for the second season first aired on Disney Channel on May 7, 2012. It was later revealed by Vanessa Morgan on Twitter that it would premiere June 29, 2012, at 8 pm Eastern Time on Disney Channel. Teletoon released its first season two promo on August 13, 2012, with the season premiering on Thursday, September 6, 2012, at 7:30 pm Eastern Time.

== Broadcast ==
=== Season 1 ===
The show originally premiered on Teletoon on March 14, 2011, and on Télétoon on February 28, 2011. In the United States it premiered on June 27, 2011, on Disney Channel. In the UK and Ireland it premiered on October 4, 2011, on Disney Channel and in April 2012 on Disney XD. The series premiered in late 2011 in Australia and New Zealand.

=== Season 2 ===
The second season originally premiered on Teletoon on September 6, 2012, and on Télétoon on October 28, 2012. In the United States it premiered on June 29, 2012, on Disney Channel. In the UK and Ireland it premiered on October 22, 2012, on Disney Channel. The season premiered October 6, 2012, on Disney Channel in Australia and New Zealand.

== Reception ==
=== Ratings ===
The first season episodes of My Babysitter's a Vampire that aired on Disney Channel in the United States in June 2011, averaged 3.7 million viewers and was the number 1 cable show among kids 2–11 in its time period (weekdays 7 pm/6c). In an interview about Disney Channel programming; Senior VP of programming, scheduling, multiplatform, acquisitions and co-productions, Paul DeBenedittis; stated "My Babysitter’s a Vampire was a great performer for us this past summer (June and July 2011). It is a well-crafted series, with rich characters and great stories. It was creator-driven, with a strong point of view that was relevant and connected with our core audience in a big way," when he was asked about top-performing acquired programming.

The second-season premiere episode ("Welcome Back Dusker"), which originally aired June 29, 2012, on Disney Channel in the United States, was watched by approximately 3.20 million total viewers and was ranked as Friday's #2 cable TV telecast and the #2 TV telecast in Tweens 9–14 (1.3 million/5.5 rating).

=== Awards and nominations ===
| Year | Group | Award | Recipient(s) | Result |
|---|---|---|---|---|
| 2011 | Gemini Award | Best Dramatic Mini-Series or TV Movie | My Babysitter's a Vampire | Nominated |
| 2011 | Gemini Award | Best Performance by an Actor in a Featured Supporting Role in a Dramatic Program or Mini-Series | Atticus Mitchell | Nominated |
| 2011 | Directors Guild of Canada Award | Best Direction in a Television Movie or Mini-Series | Bruce McDonald | Nominated |
| 2011 | Directors Guild of Canada Award | Best Production Design in a Television Movie or Mini-Series | Ingrid Jurek | Nominated |
| 2011 | Directors Guild of Canada Award | Best Sound Editing in a Television Movie or Mini-Series | Robert Hegedus, Marvyn Dennis, Kevin Howard, Mark Beck, Gren-Erich Zwicker, and Richard Calistan | Nominated |
| 2012 | Canadian Screenwriting Awards | Children and Youth | Ken Cuperus (for "Blood Drive") and Ben Joseph (for "Friday Night Frights") | Nominated |
| 2012 | Canadian Screenwriting Awards | Children and Youth | Alice Prodanou (for "ReVamped") | Won |
| 2012 | Young Artist Award | Best Performance in a TV Series – Leading Young Actor | Matthew Knight | Nominated |
| 2012 | Pixie Award | Pixie Gold Award – Visual Effects | My Babysitter's a Vampire | Won |
| 2012 | Shaw Rocket Prize | N/A | Brian Irving | Won |
| 2012 | Digi Award | Best in Cross-Platform: Kids | The Secret Location (Humans vs. Vampires) | Nominated |
| 2012 | Creativity International Awards | Web Game and Entertainment Design | The Secret Location (Humans vs. Vampires); Honorable Mention | Nominated |
| 2013 | Kidscreen Awards | Best Companion Website | The Secret Location (Humans vs. Vampires) | Nominated |
| 2013 | Canadian Screen Awards | Best Cross-Platform Project – Children's and Youth | Secret Location, Fresh TV Inc.: James Milward, Ryan Andal, Pietro Gagliano, and Sabrina Saccoccio (Humans vs. Vampires) | Won |
| 2013 | Canadian Screen Awards | Best Direction in a Children's or Youth Program or Series | Brian Roberts (for "Three Geeks and a Demon") | Nominated |
| 2013 | Canadian Screenwriting Awards | Children's Programs | Miles Smith (for "Hottie Ho-Tep"), Richard Elliott and Simon Racioppa (for "Independence Daze") | Nominated |
| 2013 | Youth Media Alliance Award | Awards of Excellence for Best Television Program, All Genres, Ages 9–12 Category | Episode: "Fanged and Furious" | Nominated |
| 2013 | FITC Award | People's Choice (Animation) | (Humans vs. Vampires) | Nominated |
| 2013 | Young Artist Award | Best Performance in a TV Series – Recurring Young Actress | Addision Holley (Anastasia) tied with Kiernan Shipka ("Mad Men") | Won |
| 2013 | Canadian Cinema Editors Awards | Best Editing in 1/2 hour Broadcast Short Form | Ellen Fine (for "Fanged and Furious") | Nominated |

== Video game ==
In May 2011, prior to first-season episodes of My Babysitter's a Vampire airing on Disney Channel in the United States, and after certain episodes aired as sneak peeks on Teletoon/Télétoon (in Canada); Secret Location, with support from the Bell Broadcast and New Media Fund, began developing a video game for Teletoon and MBAV called "Humans vs. Vampires in 3D". Humans vs. Vampires is a modern spin on classic arcade-style games like Street Fighter and Mortal Kombat. In this badge system game, the user can play as either a human or a vampire, using over 30 battle moves to defy their opponent, including three special moves unique to each character. Each character has over 30 moves plus three special moves, players battle their way through five levels and five different opponents, with rivals getting increasingly more difficult to beat as the game progresses. The points that are scored get counted toward the overall site tally, which affect the outcome of the season finale.

A testing session for the game took place in Toronto, Ontario, CA on Sunday, June 5, 2011, before the game officially launched on the official website on October 14, 2011. In February 2012, popular game site Kongregate added Humans vs. Vampires to their website. Based on the final scores for each team, an extra scene was aired after the season one finale on Teletoon that was not aired on Disney Channel (the original episode remained unaltered).

Between July 27 and July 31, 2012, another testing session for Humans vs. Vampires took place in Toronto for an iOS App release for mobile devices to play the game. In the mobile version, Ethan's sister Jane and a character from season 2 named Boltz are added to the game. It's optimized for the fourth generation iPod touch, iPhone 4 and iPhone 4S.

The game was free to download in the App Store under the title "Humans VS Vampires", but was quietly removed a few years later. A one-time 99 cent in-app upgrade allows players to unlock all five good guys and five undead characters. The game has been nominated for a Digi and Kidscreen Award, and won a Canadian Screen Award for Best Cross-Platform Project in Children's and Youth.

== See also ==
- Vampire film
- List of vampire television series
