= Kate Todd =

Canadian actress and singer-songwriter

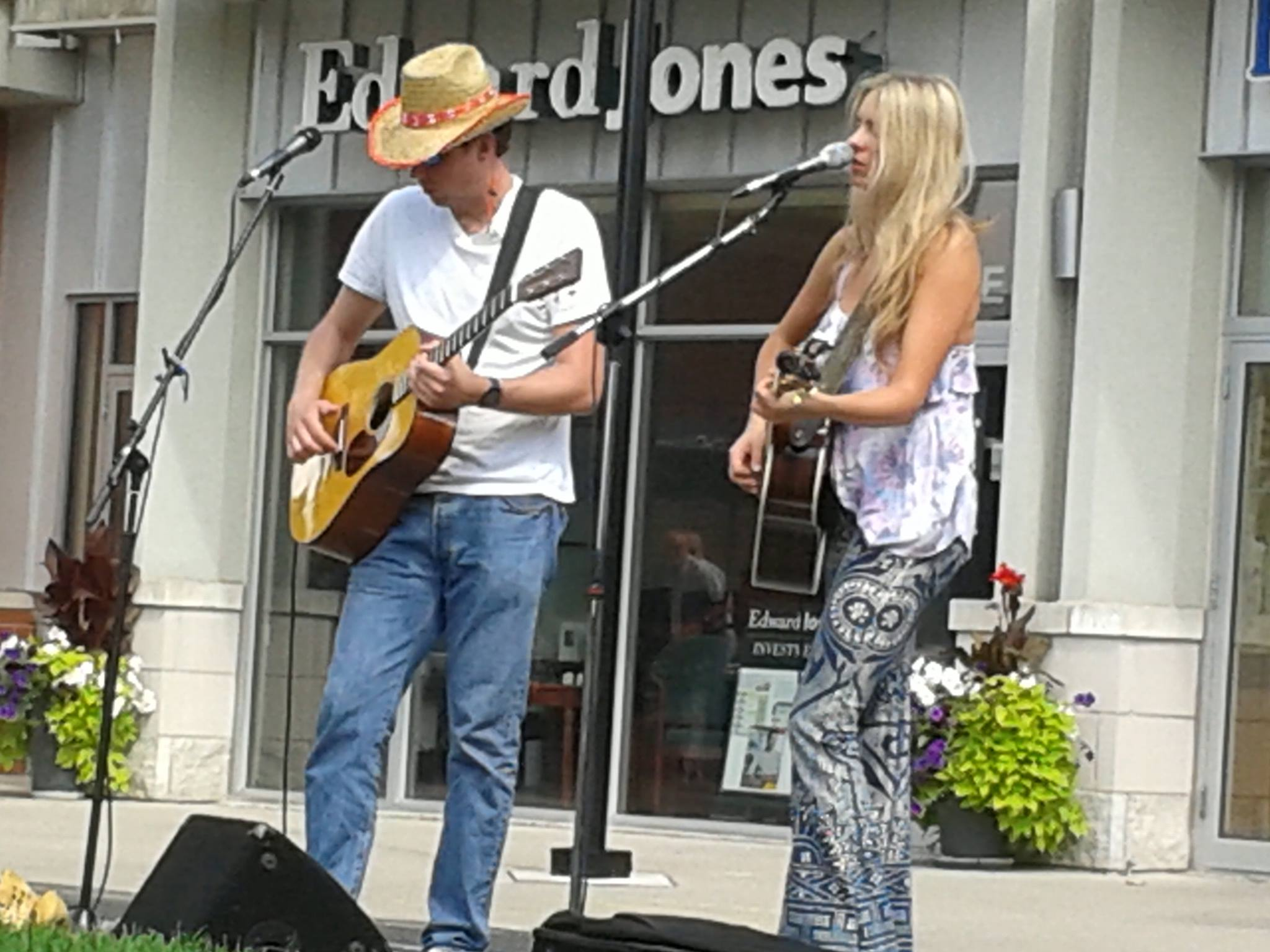
- Kate Todd (at right) performing in Port Credit, Mississauga, Ontario in August 2013
- Born: December 12, 1987 (age 38); Barrie, Ontario, Canada
- Occupations: Actress; singer-songwriter
- Years active: 2002–present
- Spouse: Norbert Feigler (m. 2017)
- Children: 1

Kate Todd (born December 12, 1987) is a Canadian actress and singer-songwriter. She rose to prominence as a teenager playing Lily Randall in the Family Channel series Radio Free Roscoe (2003–2005), and went on to appear in Life with Derek, Naturally, Sadie, and The L.A. Complex. She is also known for her role as Erica Jones in the My Babysitter's a Vampire film (2010) and television series (2011–2012). As a musician, Todd has released three studio albums and received multiple nominations from the Country Music Association of Ontario.

== Early life ==
Todd grew up in Innisfil, Ontario, where she attended Nantyr Shores Secondary School, graduating with honors and earning the distinction of receiving a designate Ontario Scholar award. Throughout her youth she was known as Katie, but changed to Kate when she started acting.

== Career ==
=== Acting ===
Todd got her acting start at age fourteen when she landed the lead role of Lily Randall on the popular television series Radio Free Roscoe. The show ran for four seasons (52 episodes), received the 'Best Teen Show' award and the 'Parent's Choice' award at the New York Worlds Festival in 2003 and a Gemini Award in 2005, and continues to be aired in Canada, the United States, and many countries throughout the world.

In 2006, Todd performed in the feature film The Tracey Fragments. She later played the lead role of Lauren Findley in the movie Grizzly Rage. She also made appearances on the TV shows Naturally, Sadie and Life with Derek, in which she had a recurring role as Sally.

Todd has since appeared in a Lifetime Movie of the Week, More Sex and the Single Mom, and the CBC movie Booky Makes Her Mark. She also had a main role as Erica, a teenage vampire, in the series My Babysitter's a Vampire.

=== Music ===
Todd released her debut album Finding My Way in April 2012. She won Best New Album at the 2012 Radio Nation Music Awards. In 2014 she released a Christmas album Country Christmas. Todd released her sophomore album Anywhere With You in April 2015. On February 26, 2016 Todd released the single "Should've Told" feat. Kyle Shedrick.

== Charity work ==
Todd has been involved with the KidsFest Canada charity, a non-government funded program designed to help fight child poverty.

In 2011, Todd appeared at the Party for Freedom at York University in Toronto, Ontario, Canada which launched the Alliance Against Modern Slavery, a nonprofit organization seeking to combat human trafficking through partnerships, education, and research. At this event, Todd was joined by Glendene Grant, human trafficking victim Jessie Foster's mother; Kevin Bales, co-founder and president of Free the Slaves; Roger Cram of Hiram College; Janelle Belgrave of Samba Elégua Drummers and Peace Concept; Natasha Falle, a survivor of human trafficking; and Jeff Gunn, a guitarist.

== Discography ==
=== Studio albums ===
Title	Details
Finding My Way	Released: April 3, 2012; Format: CD, Digital download, Streaming; Label: Independent
Anywhere With You	Released: May 12, 2015; Format: CD, Digital download, Streaming; Label: Independent

=== Compilation albums ===
Title	Compilation album details
Country Christmas	Released: November 10, 2014; Format: CD; Label: Independent

=== Extended plays ===
Title	Details
One	Released: June 23, 2017; Format: Digital download, streaming; Label: Villa Sound

=== Singles ===
Title	Year	Album
"Footprints On The Moon"	2012	Finding My Way
"(Things I) Never Should Have Said"	2013	Finding My Way
"Hit Me With Your Best Shot" (featuring Jeff Healey)	2014	Non-album single
"Country Christmas"	2014	Country Christmas
"Anywhere With You"	2015	Anywhere With You
"My Country"	2015	Anywhere With You
"Should've Told" (featuring Kyle Shedrick)	2015	Non-album single
"To Whom It May Concern"	2017	One
"No Woe" (featuring Joey Landreth)	2017	One

=== Guest appearances ===
Song	Year	Album
"God Rest Ye Merry, Gentlemen" (Nicholas Tetreault featuring Kate Todd)	2016	Non-album single

=== Music videos ===
Title	Year	Director
"Hit Me With Your Best Shot"	2014	LX
"Country Christmas"	2014	Kate Todd & Peter Linseman
"Anywhere With You"	2015	Kate Todd & Peter Linseman
"You're Gonna Find Out"	2017	—N/a
"Just The Same"	2017	—N/a

== Filmography ==
=== Film ===
Year	Title	Role	Notes
2002	Narc	Kid #1	
2006	Grizzly Rage	Lauren Findley	
2007	The Tracey Fragments	Tonka	
2007	More Sex and the Single Mom	Frankie	Lifetime television film
2008	Booky Makes Her Mark	Marlene	CBC television film
2010	My Babysitter's a Vampire	Erica	Television film

=== Television ===
Year	Title	Role	Notes
2003–2005	Radio Free Roscoe	Lily Randall / "Shady Lane"	Lead role; 52 episodes
2004	Strange Days at Blake Holsey High	Cassie	Episode: "Inquiry"
2005	Naturally, Sadie	Monique	Episode: "Clique Clique"
2005–2009	Life with Derek	Sally	Recurring role; 10 episodes
2006	Degrassi: The Next Generation	Emily/Natasha	Episode: "Here Comes Your Man: Part 2", & "Hungry Eyes"
2009-2010	Cashing In	Chrissy Eastman	Recurring role; 7 episodes
2011–2012	My Babysitter's a Vampire	Erica Jones	Main role; 24 episodes
2012	The L.A. Complex	Katee	Recurring role; 4 episodes

=== Video games ===
Year	Title	Role	Notes
2014	Assassin's Creed Unity	Bishop	Voice role
2015	Assassin's Creed Syndicate	Bishop	Voice role
2016	Tom Clancy's The Division	Additional voices	Voice role

== Awards and nominations ==
=== Music awards ===
Year	Award	Category	Result	Ref.
2012	Radio Nation Music Awards	Best New Album	Won	
2013	Country Music Association of Ontario	Rising Star	Nominated	
2014	Country Music Association of Ontario	Rising Star	Nominated	
2014	Toronto Independent Music Awards	Best Country Artist	Nominated	
2015	Toronto Independent Music Awards	Best Country Artist	Nominated	
2016	Josie Music Awards	Female Rising Star of the Year	Nominated	
2016	Josie Music Awards	Vocalist of the Year	Nominated	
2016	Josie Music Awards	Video of the Year	Won	
