= Vanessa Morgan =

Canadian actress (born 1992)

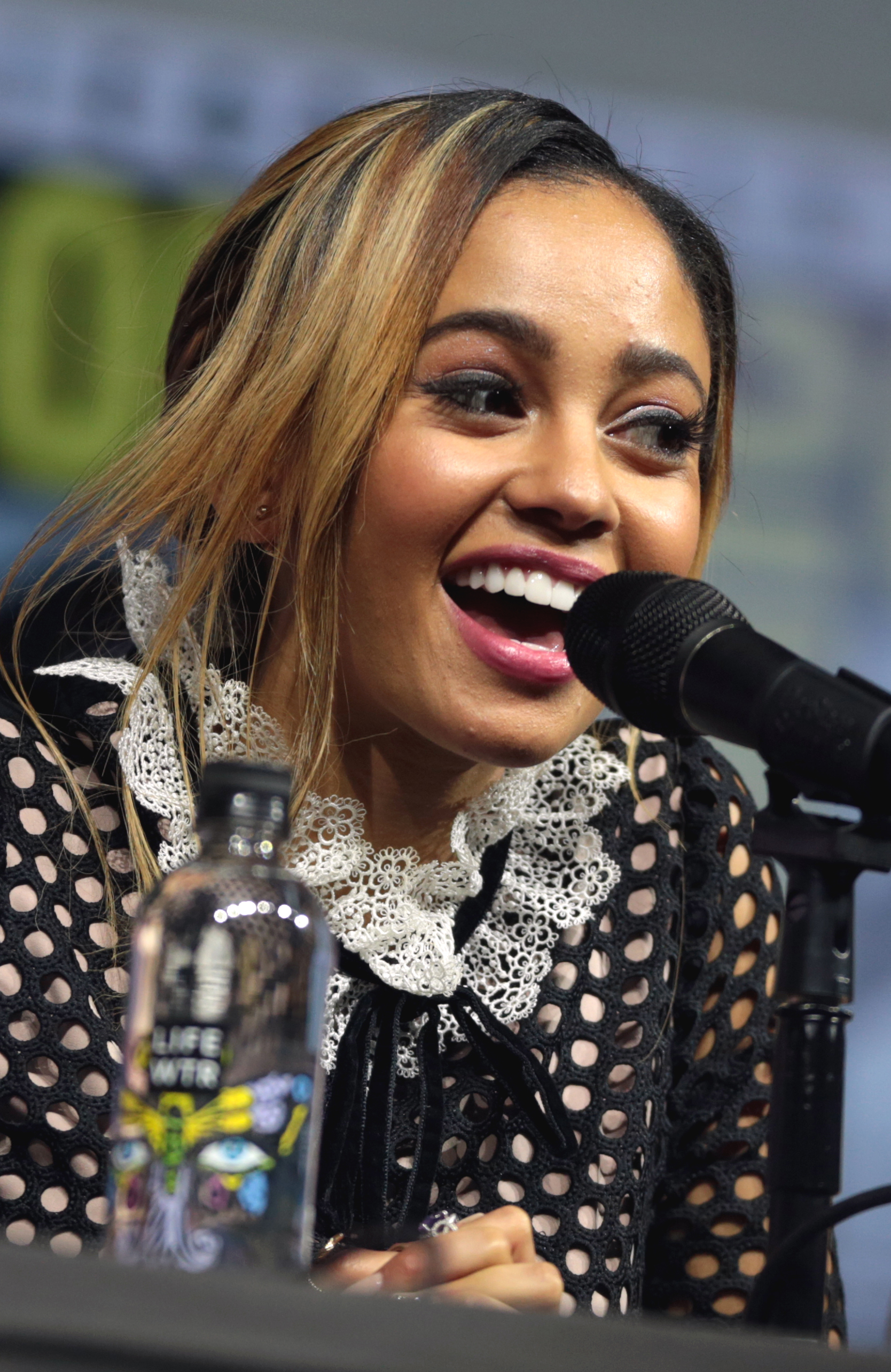
- Morgan at the 2018 San Diego Comic-Con
- Born: Vanessa Morgan Mziray; March 23, 1992 (age 34); Ottawa, Ontario, Canada
- Education: Queen's University
- Occupation: Actress
- Years active: 2000–present
- Spouse: Michael Kopech (m. 2020; div. 2021)
- Partner: James Karnik (eng. 2024)
- Children: 2

Vanessa Morgan Mziray (born March 23, 1992) is a Canadian actress. She is known for her roles as Beatrix "Bird" Castro in the MTV teen drama series Finding Carter, as Amanda Pierce in the Family teen comedy series The Latest Buzz, and as Sarah in the Disney Channel / Teletoon film My Babysitter's a Vampire and the television series of the same name. From 2017 to 2023, she played Toni Topaz in the CW teen drama series Riverdale.

== Early life ==
Morgan was born in Ottawa, Ontario. Her mother, Catherine, is Scottish and her father, Loyar, is Tanzanian. Morgan is the youngest of three children. She has two older siblings: an older sister and an older brother. Morgan began singing at the age of six. She sang at community events and telethons, performed for Childhelp, and was a regular guest entertainer for the College of the Desert scholarship foundation. She was spotted by a Hollywood agent in 1999 and earned a scholarship at a Hollywood acting academy. In 1999, Morgan won America's Junior Miss pageant and won first place vocalist at the National Date Festival. In 2000, she won first place in the African-American Vocal Competition. In her early life, she was a member of the competitive NTA tennis program at the Ottawa Athletic Club. Morgan graduated from Colonel By Secondary School in 2010 and studied philosophy at Queen's University.

== Career ==
=== Acting ===
Morgan made her acting debut in the VH1 film A Diva's Christmas Carol in 2000 and another appearance in the film Frankie & Alice in 2010. She became known in 2007 for her role as Amanda Pearce in the Family teen comedy series The Latest Buzz as well as performing the theme song for the series. She also played Marion Hawthorne in the 2010 Disney Channel film Harriet the Spy: Blog Wars.

The following year, Morgan played Sarah in the Teletoon / Disney Channel film My Babysitter's a Vampire, as well in the television series of the same name. Morgan also appeared in the 2011 Disney Channel film Geek Charming. She had a recurring role in season 2 of the Disney Channel comedy series A.N.T. Farm for four episodes.

In 2013, Morgan appeared on Degrassi: The Next Generation for two episodes.

In 2014, Morgan had a recurring role on the MTV show Finding Carter, playing Beatrix "Bird" Castro.

In 2017, she joined the main cast of the fantasy drama series The Shannara Chronicles as Lyria for the second season on Spike. Morgan was then cast in the recurring role of Toni Topaz in the CW teen drama series Riverdale. On May 2, 2018, it was announced that Morgan would be a series regular for the show's third season.

Since 2024, Morgan has played Max Mitchell, a street-smart thief lead role in the Canadian comedy-drama series Wild Cards.

=== Other work ===
Morgan competed in the first season of the CTV reality competition series The Amazing Race Canada with her sister, Celina Mziray. They finished the race in third place.

== Personal life ==
On July 3, 2019, Morgan became engaged to professional baseball player Michael Kopech. They were married on January 4, 2020. On June 19, 2020, Kopech filed for divorce. On July 24, 2020, Morgan announced she was pregnant. As of December 2020, the divorce case was pending. In 2021, Morgan gave birth to a son. Morgan and Kopech officially divorced in 2021. In 2024, Morgan gave birth to a daughter fathered by Canadian basketball player James Karnik. Morgan announced her engagement to Karnik on December 24, 2024.

== Filmography ==
Year	Title	Role	Notes
2000	A Diva's Christmas Carol	Young Ebony	Television film
2007–2010	The Latest Buzz	Amanda Pierce	Main role
2010	Harriet the Spy: Blog Wars	Marion Hawthorne	Television film
2010	Frankie & Alice	16-year-old Frankie	Film; credited as Vanessa Morgan Mziray
2010	My Babysitter's a Vampire	Sarah	Television film
2011–2012	My Babysitter's a Vampire	Sarah	Main role
2011	Geek Charming	Hannah Mornell	
2012	A.N.T. Farm	Jeanne Gossamer / Vanessa LaFontaine	4 episodes
2013	Degrassi	Vanessa	2 episodes
2013	Saving Hope	Ricki Wilkins	Episode: "Why Waste Time"
2013	The Amazing Race Canada	Herself/Contestant	Season 1 contestant, 3rd place
2014	Guilty at 17	Leigh	Television film
2014	The Night Session	Brittany / Intruder	Short film
2014–2015	Finding Carter	Beatrix "Bird" Castro	Recurring role
2015	Some Assembly Required	Jazlyn Sims	Episode: "Award Show in a Box"
2017	The Shannara Chronicles	Lyria	Main role (season 2)
2017–2023	Riverdale	Toni Topaz	Recurring role (season 2), main role (season 3–7)
2018	Pimp	Destiny	Film
2019	Lip Sync Battle	Herself	Episode: "Andy Grammer vs. Vanessa Morgan"
2022	Margaux	Lexi	Film
2024–present	Wild Cards	Max Mitchell	Main role

Music videos
Year	Title	Artist(s)	Ref.
2008	"Stand Up!"	Herself	
2018	"Be My Joker"	Herself	
2019	"Higher Love"	Kygo and Whitney Houston	

== Discography ==
Released	Song(s)	Album	Ref.
2018	"Be My Joker"	N/A	
2018	"In", "The World According To Chris", "You Shine (Reprise)", and "A Night We'll Never Forget"	Riverdale: Special Episode – Carrie the Musical (Original Television Soundtrack)	
2019	"Candy Store", "Big Fun", "Dead Girl Walking", "Seventeen", and "Seventeen (Encore)"	Riverdale: Special Episode – Heathers the Musical (Original Television Soundtrack)	
2019	"Call Your Girlfriend"	Riverdale: Season 3 (Original Television Soundtrack)	
2020	"Wicked Little Town", "Random Number Generation", "Tear Me Down", "Wig in a Box", "Sugar Daddy", and "Midnight Radio"	Riverdale: Special Episode – Hedwig and the Angry Inch the Musical (Original Television Soundtrack)	
2020	"Cherry Bomb"	Riverdale: Season 4 (Original Television Soundtrack) – EP	
2020	"Sleep When I'm Dead"	N/A	
2021	"After Dark"	N/A	

== Awards and nominations ==
Year	Award	Category	Work	Result	Ref.
2009	Young Artist Award	Best Performance in a TV series – Leading Young Actress (Comedy or Drama)	The Latest Buzz	Nominated	
2014	Planet Africa Awards	Rising Star	Herself	Won	
2018	Teen Choice Awards	Choice Breakout TV Star	Riverdale	Won	
2018	Teen Choice Awards	Choice Scene Stealer	Riverdale	Won	
2019	MTV Movie & TV Awards	Best Musical Moment	Riverdale	Nominated	
2019	Teen Choice Awards	Choice Ship (with Madelaine Petsch)	Riverdale	Nominated	
