= My Babysitter's a Vampire =

- Original release poster
- Also known as: My Babysitter's a Vampire: The Movie
- Genre: Comedy horror
- Teleplay by: Tim Burns
- Story by: Tom McGillis; Jennifer Pertsch; Tim Burns
- Directed by: Bruce McDonald
- Starring: Matthew Knight; Vanessa Morgan; Atticus Mitchell; Cameron Kennedy; Kate Todd
- Composers: James Chapple; Graeme Cornies; David Brian Kelly (as David Kelly); Brian L. Pickett (as Brian Pickett)
- Country of origin: Canada
- Original language: English

Production
- Producers: Brian Irving; Kevin May
- Cinematography: Rudi Blahacek; Rudolph Blahacek
- Editor: Ellen Fine
- Running time: 81 minutes
- Production company: Fresh TV
- Budget: CA$3 million

Original release
- Network: Teletoon/Télétoon
- Release: October 9, 2010

Related
- My Babysitter's a Vampire (TV series)

My Babysitter's a Vampire (released as My Babysitter's a Vampire: The Movie in some regions) is a 2010 Canadian comedy horror television film directed by Bruce McDonald. It stars Vanessa Morgan and Matthew Knight. The film's plot centers on a group of teenagers, one of them a vampire unwittingly hired by a couple to babysit their daughter in lieu of their somewhat untrustworthy son, and their efforts to foil a plot to resurrect a cult group of dead vampires.

The movie aired on October 9, 2010, on the Canadian television channel Teletoon. The French version of the film aired on Teletoon's French-Canadian counterpart, Télétoon, on October 16, 2010. It premiered in the United States on Disney Channel June 10, 2011.

== Plot ==
Ethan Morgan is a geeky high school freshman, not trusted by his parents to take care of his little sister Jane on his own. They hire Erica, a teenage girl from Ethan's school who is a huge fan of Dusk (a parody of Twilight), as a babysitter. Erica instead decides to attend a party thrown by Jesse, the vampire ex-boyfriend of her best friend Sarah. During a fight between Sarah and Jesse, Sarah ends up at Ethan's house and tells Ethan's parents that she was asked to babysit instead. Ethan becomes infatuated with Sarah. Ethan suddenly has a vision when touching Sarah, and notices she has no reflection in the mirror.

Sarah leaves to get Erica back from the party, knowing the party is full of bloodthirsty vampires. Curious, Ethan and his dorky best friend Benny follow Sarah. They see her feed on a rat and realize she is a vampire. Sarah explains that she is only a fledgling, a vampire who has not drunk human blood. The three of them are attacked by a vampire sent by Jesse, and head to the party to save Erica and their dimwitted friend, Rory. However, Erica has already been bitten and also bites Rory.

The next day, Ethan has a vision in which he sees a gravestone with the number 219 and a mysterious box, which is then uncovered by the vampires. The box is called the Cubile Animus or "Nest of Souls". Ethan and Sarah figure out Jesse's plan from an old book, learning that in the original settlement of the town, a man named Reverend Horace Black who led an evil cabal of vampires. During a lunar eclipse, the townspeople burned the members, leading to all '219' of their deaths. Ethan realizes that Jesse is, in fact, Horace Black, and plans to use the box to trap the souls of teens going to see the premiere of the new Dusk movie so he can resurrect the souls of his ancient group during the lunar eclipse.

Benny's grandmother, who reveals that she is an Earth Priestess, gives Ethan, Benny and Sarah enchanted daggers and a spell book to defeat the vampires. She explains that Ethan sees visions because he is a Seer, which enables him to see visions through touch, and Benny is a spellmaster, allowing him to cast spells. At the theater, the vampires begin to steal the souls of the teens, but are thwarted by the trio. In a vision, Ethan sees the tree he saw inside the old book, realizing it's the tree in his backyard, where they find Jesse. As the eclipse begins, Jesse attempts to hold Ethan and Benny down and resurrect the souls he already obtained from the Cubile Animus, but Sarah intervenes. When the box lands in Ethan's hands, he releases the vengeful souls that were captured, which destroy Jesse and return to their bodies.

The next day, Ethan, Benny and Sarah meet Erica and Rory, who have decided to live peacefully as vampires.

== Cast ==
- Matthew Knight as Ethan
- Vanessa Morgan as Sarah
- Atticus Mitchell as Benny
- Cameron Kennedy as Rory
- Kate Todd as Erica
- Joe Dinicol as Jesse
- Ella Jonas Farlinger as Jane
- Ari Cohen as Ethan's Dad
- Laura DeCarteret as Ethan's Mom
- Hrant Alianak as Principal Hicks
- Joan Gregson as Grandma
- Cassie Steele as Rochelle
- Jamie Johnston as James

== Broadcast ==
The movie originally premiered on Teletoon on October 9, 2010, and on Télétoon on October 16, 2010. In the United States it premiered on June 10, 2011 on Disney Channel. The Disney Channel version (which was made in collaboration with distributor Fremantle Media) has minor edits to the film to meet the network's standards and practices, but most of the film was left the same. In select territories, the film was distributed by Phase 4 Films, a now defunct distribution company which specialized in direct-to-dvd releases.

== Television series ==
A television series based on the film has been produced. It was created by Fresh TV, creators of 6teen and Total Drama. The first four episodes of the series aired on Teletoon (English) from March 14, 2011, to March 17, 2011 and on Télétoon (French) from February 28, 2011, to March 3, 2011. The series formally premiered in Canada on January 5, 2012, on both channels. The series premiered on Disney Channel on June 27, 2011, in the United States, and the channel aired all the episodes of the first season in the US before they premiered in Canada. The first season officially premiered in Canada on January 5, 2012. It was produced by Fresh TV.

Season 2 of the show has been greenlit by Fresh TV, and was originally revealed by Vanessa Morgan on her official, personal Twitter. Filming began on September 21, 2011, to November 17, 2011. The same day filming ended, Disney Channel announced they would pick it up for a second season. The second season first premiered on Disney Channel in the US on June 29, 2012. It made its premiere on Teletoon in Canada on September 6, 2012. The series ended on a cliffhanger with the Season 2 finale. A second movie was planned to be in the works but due to issues with broadcasters and budgeting, it was not able to be produced, effectively ending the franchise outright.

== Reception ==
=== Critical response ===
Common Sense Media rated the film 2 out of 5 stars and for kids ages 12+, "Parents need to know that there's plenty of violence in this Canadian-made TV movie (later made into a series), but most of it is obscured to the point that little actual blood is really seen.(...) it might be an OK alternative for some older tweens". My Babysitter's a Vampire was ranked #2 on Disney Channel's top 10 Halloween movies by Paste Magazine. The movie is praised for subverting vampiric stereotypes by being satirically aware of itself.

=== Ratings ===
On its original airing on June 10, 2011, on Disney Channel in the United States, the TV film pulled approximately 4.18 million total viewers and 0.6 rating in the age 18-49 demographic, ranking in seventh place in that age demographic but leading that night in top total viewers.

=== Accolades ===
Year	Group	Award	Recipient(s)	Result
2011	Gemini Award	Best Dramatic Mini-Series or TV Movie	My Babysitter's a Vampire	Nominated
2011	Gemini Award	Best Performance by an Actor in a Featured Supporting Role in a Dramatic Program or Mini-Series	Atticus Mitchell	Nominated
2011	Directors Guild of Canada Award	Best Direction in a Television Movie or Mini-Series	Bruce McDonald	Nominated
2011	Directors Guild of Canada Award	Best Production Design in a Television Movie or Mini-Series	Ingrid Jurek	Nominated
2011	Directors Guild of Canada Award	Best Sound Editing in a Television Movie or Mini-Series	Gren-Erich Zwicker, and Richard Calistan	Nominated

== See also ==
- Vampire film
- The Twilight Saga in popular culture
