= Burchett =

Burchett is a surname. Notable people with the surname include:

- Josiah Burchett, British Secretary of the Admiralty (1694–1742)
- Wilfred Burchett, Australian war journalist, alleged KGB agent, and first Westerner to cover the aftermath of the dropping of the atom bomb on Hiroshima (1911–1983)
- Tim Burchett, the U.S. representative for Tennessee's 2nd congressional district
- James Burchett, Australian, Justice on the Federal Court of Australia and President of the Copyright Tribunal
- George Burchett, English tattoo artist popular with the wealthy upper class of England and royalty including King George V
- Rick Burchett, American illustrator, comics artist for Batman, Superman, the Flash, Blackhawk, and American Flagg
- Mark Burchett, Hollywood film director and producer, horror movies
- Thomas Burchett, Mayor of Rye, Sussex, England, elected 1538

== See also ==
- Burchett's Green, Berkshire, England
- Burchett Way, located in the London Borough of Barking and Dagenham
