= Michael Fox =

Michael or Mike Fox may refer to:

== Entertainment ==
- Michael Fox (American actor) (1921–1996), American character actor
- Michael Fox (British actor) (born 1989), British actor
- Michael J. Fox (born 1961), Canadian-American actor

== Law and politics ==
- Michael Fox (judge) (1921–2007), English barrister and Court of Appeal judge
- Michael Fox (lawyer) (1934–2009), British-born Israeli lawyer
- Michael A. Fox, member of the Ohio House of Representatives
- Mike Fox (politician), member of the Montana Senate

== Religion and philosophy ==
- Michael Allen Fox (born 1940), American/Canadian/Australian philosopher
- Michael Fox (priest) (born 1942), British priest
- Michael V. Fox, American Bible scholar

== Sports ==
- Mike Fox (American football) (born 1967), American football player formerly with the New York Giants
- Mike Fox (baseball), retired baseball coach of the North Carolina Tar Heels
- Mike Fox (soccer) (born 1961), American soccer player
- Michael Fox (ice hockey) (born 1989), British professional ice hockey player
- Mike Fox (horse), Canadian racehorse

== Other people ==
- Michael D. Fox, American neurologist
- Michael Fox (unionist) (died 1978), Scottish-born American labor union leader
