= Evil Ambitions =

1996 horror film directed by Mark Burchett

- DVD cover
- Directed by: Mark Burchett; Michael D. Fox
- Written by: Mark Burchett; Michael D. Fox
- Produced by: Mark Burchett
- Starring: Paul Morris; Amber Newman; David Levy; Lucy Frashure; Renae Raos; Debbie Rochon; S. William Hinzman
- Cinematography: Jeff Barklage
- Edited by: Michael D. Fox
- Music by: Denise Roland
- Release date: 1996 (U.S.)
- Language: English

Evil Ambitions (also known as Satanic Yuppies) is a 1996 horror film directed by Mark Burchett. The film stars Paul Morris, Amber Newman, David Levy, Lucy Frashure, Renae Raos, Debbie Rochon and S. William Hinzman. The plot revolves around a public relations firm that is secretly a front for Devil worship. Young female models are kidnapped and sacrificed to Satan.

== Cast ==
- Paul Morris as Pete McGavin
- Amber Newman as Brittany Drake
- David A. Levy as Gideon Jessup (credited as David Levy
- Lucy Frashure as Julie Swanson
- Renae Raos as Detective Leslie Kellog
- Debbie Rochon as Madame Natalie
- S. William Hinzman as Miles Bishop (credited as Bill Hinzman)
- Kindra Laub as Gretchen
- Rob Calvert as Lester
- Cari Minster as Tawny
- Amy Ballard as Victoria
- Stacey Sparks as Jamie
- Randy Rupp as Satan
- Dakota Summers as Mrs. Jessup (credited as Dakotah Summers)
- Katie Wilke as Daphne
- Lonzo Jones as Tyler
- Ashley Lottes as Mindy
- Mark Mills as O'Herlihy
- Glori-Anne Gilbert as Jessup's 'Intern'
- Chrystal Waters as Jessup's 'Intern'
- Naomi Keates as Flame Dancer
- Ryan Cronin as Henchman
