= Deepak Singh =

Deepak Singh may refer to:

- Deepak Singh (film producer) (born 1973), Indian film producer
- Deepak Singh (politician) (born 1975), Indian politician
