= Bill Hinzman =

American actor (1936–2012)

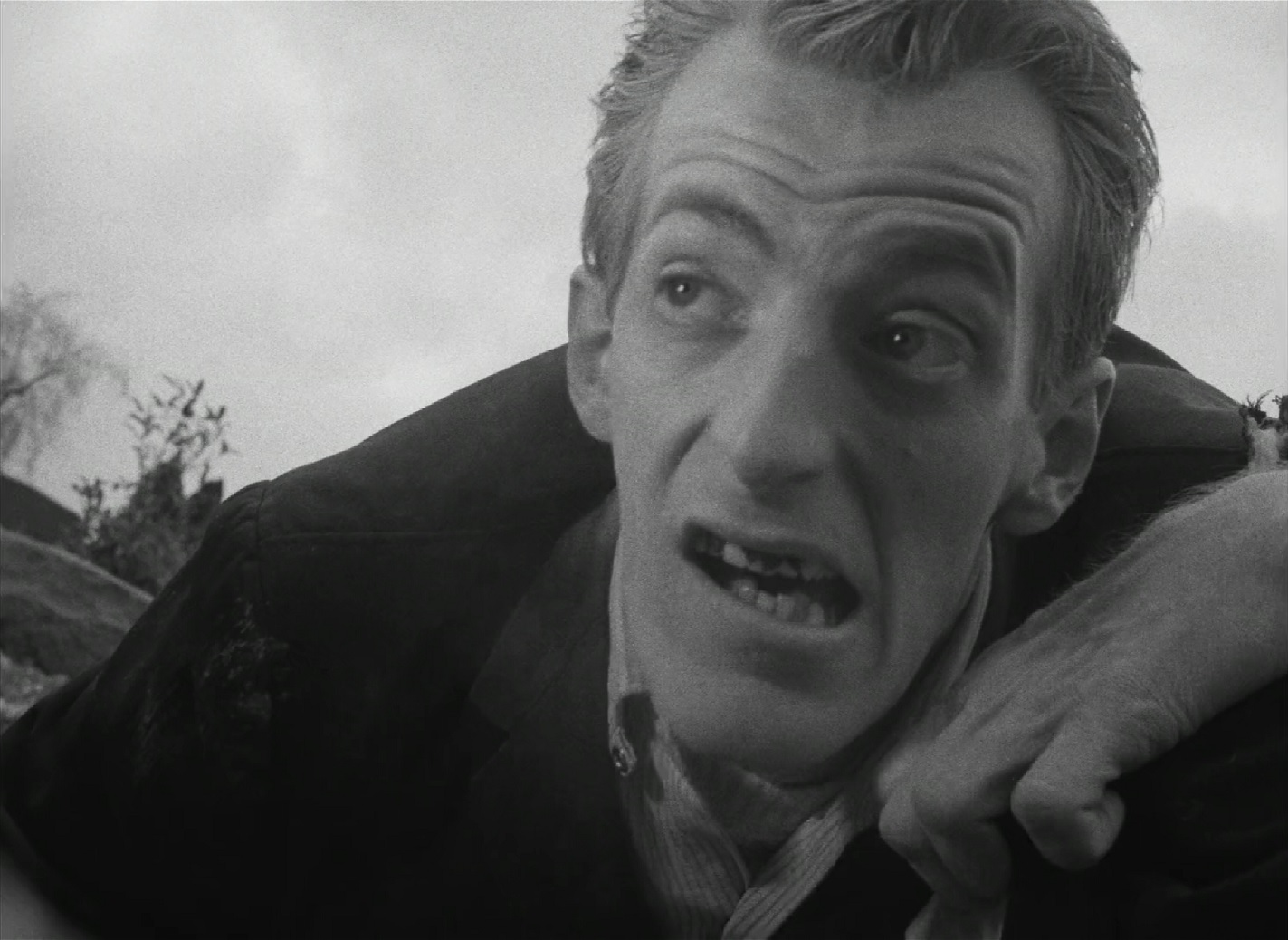
- Hinzman as the cemetery zombie from Night of the Living Dead (1968)
- Born: Samuel William Hinzman; October 24, 1936; Coraopolis, Pennsylvania, U.S.
- Died: February 5, 2012 (aged 75); Darlington, Pennsylvania, U.S.
- Occupations: Actor, director, cinematographer, producer, editor and writer
- Years active: 1967 - 2011

Samuel William Hinzman (October 24, 1936 – February 5, 2012), often credited as Bill Hinzman or Heinzman, was an American actor and film director.

== Career ==
Hinzman's first acting role was the cemetery zombie in the popular horror film Night of the Living Dead (1968). He reprised the role in new scenes that were filmed for the 30th-anniversary edition of the film. During filming of Night of the Living Dead, crew member Gary Streiner accidentally caught himself on fire while attempting to ignite a prop with gasoline. Hinzman managed to put out the fire, saving Streiner's life.

Hinzman also played roles in the films Legion of the Night (1995), Santa Claws (1996), Evil Ambitions (1996), and The Drunken Dead Guy (2005). His final role was in River of Darkness (2011), where he played a lead role alongside Kurt Angle, Kevin Nash and Sid Eudy.

In addition to acting, Hinzman directed the films The Majorettes (1986), and Flesheater (1988).

== Death ==
Hinzman died on February 5, 2012, from cancer. His death occurred the same day as that of Josephine Streiner (1918–2012), a crew member who played a zombie in Night of the Living Dead.

== Filmography ==
Year	Title	Role	Notes
1968	Night of the Living Dead	Zombie #1	
1971	There's Always Vanilla	Drunk Guy in Bar	
1972	Season of the Witch	The Intruder	
1973	The Crazies	Crazie shooting at doctor's office	Also cinematographer
1974	O. J. Simpson: Juice on the Loose		Cinematographer
1981	Knightriders	Mustachioed Archer in Tree	Uncredited
1987	The Majorettes	Sergeant Sanders	Also director
1988	Flesheater	FleshEater	Also director
1995	Legion of the Night	Dr. Bloom	
1996	Santa Claws	Director	
1996	Evil Ambitions	Miles Bishop	
1999	Night of the Living Dead: 30th Anniversary Edition	Zombie #1	New scenes; Also cinematographer, editor, and co-executive producer
2005	The Drunken Dead Guy	The Experienced Zombie	
2006	Shadow: Dead Riot	Romero the Zombie	
2009	The Spookshow	Bartender	
2009	It Came from Trafalgar	Zombie #1	
2011	River of Darkness	Harvey Hix	
2011	Mimesis: Night of the Living Dead	Zombie	
