= O. J. Simpson: Juice on the Loose =

1974 film by George A. Romero

- Title card
- Written by: Neil Fisher
- Directed by: George A. Romero
- Starring: O. J. Simpson
- Country of origin: United States
- Original language: English

Production
- Producers: Richard P. Rubinstein; Jane Prosnit
- Cinematography: S. William Hinzman
- Editor: George A. Romero
- Running time: 47 minutes

Original release
- Network: ABC
- Release: December 28, 1974

O. J. Simpson: Juice on the Loose is a 1974 sports documentary film directed by George A. Romero, about American football player O. J. Simpson.

== Summary ==
The documentary follows the career of O.J. Simpson, the upcoming running back (#32) for the Buffalo Bills football team. This film also include highlights from the 1973 Buffalo Bills season with the day (December 16, 1973) O.J. became the first Pro football player to reach 2,000 yards in a single season.

== Cast ==
- O. J. Simpson
- Marvin Goux
- Earl Edwards
- Reggie McKenzie
- Howard Cosell
- Larry Felser
- Dwight Chapin
- Eunice Simpson
- Shirley Baker
- Melvin Simpson
- AC Carenagens
- Marilyn O'Brien
- Chuck Barnes
- Margarite Simpson

== Release and distribution ==
The film was later re-released by Vidmark in 1994 during the O. J. Simpson murder case.
