= Jeff Rector =

American actor

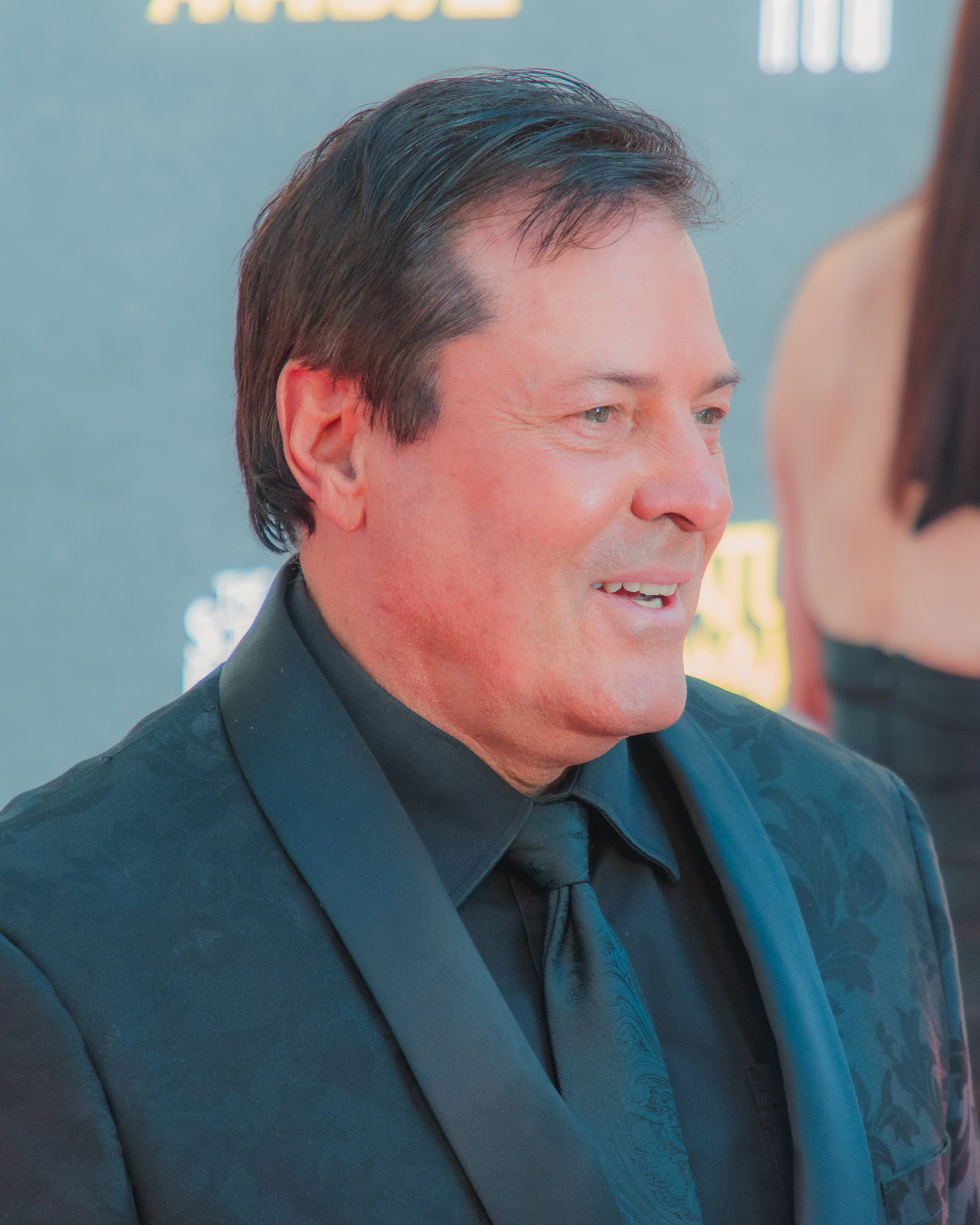
- Rector in 2026
- Born: September 12, 1958 (age 68); St. Louis, Missouri, U.S.
- Occupation: Actor

Jeff Rector (born September 12, 1958) is an American actor. He has appeared in over 150 feature films and television programs. On 28 April 2012 he hosted the launch party of the Burbank International Film Festival.

== Movies ==
- Dangerous Snowday (2021) as Aaron
- Bad President (2020) as Donald Trump
- Fragments (2008) as Cop
- Solar Flare as Trent
- InAlienable (2008) as Professor Jeffries
- Dark World (2008) as Monihan
- Scarecrow Gone Wild (2004) as Ray
- Revamped (2007) as Richard Clarke
- The Theory of Everything (2003) as Roger
- Pray Another Day (2003) as Bond James
- Fatal Kiss (2002, TV) as Richard Clarke
- Firestorm Rising (2001) as Cage
- Luna Butterflys (2000) as Bernie
- Never Look Back (2000)
- The Ramayan
- Madam Savant (1997) as Sergeant Stevens
- In My Sister's Shadow (1997, TV) as Man at bar
- Rapid Assault (1997, TV) as David Phillips
- Dinosaur Valley Girls (1996) as Tony Markham
- The Killer Inside (1996) as Alex Johnson
- Friend of the Family II (1996) as Mark
- The Darkening (1995) as Scott Griffin
- Galaxis (1995) as Tray
- Obsession Kills (1995)
- Tornado Run (1995) as Lieutenant Billy Gunn
- Ballistic (1995) as Case
- Legion of the Night (1995) as Francis Vansemié
- Death Riders (1994) as Cop
- Love Street 1: I Dreamed of Angels Crying (1994, TV)
- Magic Kid II (1994) as Jerry
- Marching Out of Time (1993) as Lieutenant Butch
- The Secrets of Lake Success (1993, TV miniseries) as Cop #1
- Hellmaster (1992) as Jesse Jameson
- Street Soldiers (1991) as Priest
- Pretty Woman (1990)
- Danger Zone III: Steel Horse War (1990) as Wyman
- Cocktail (1988) (scene cut)
- Dr. Hackenstein (1988)
- Wall Street (1987) as Trader
- Fatal Obsession
- Nightfall

== TV roles ==
- Black Scorpion as Evil Twin #2
- SFN: Science Fiction News as Host
- On Common Ground
- Promised Land
- All My Children
- One Life to Live

== TV guest appearances ==
- American Horror Story ("Valerie Solanas Died for Your Sins: Scumbag", 2017) as Male Anchor
- How I Met Your Mother ("Twelve Horny Women", 2012) as Cop
- City Guys ("Jamal X", 2000) as Policeman #1
- Arrest & Trial (2000)
- Beverly Hills, 90210 ("Local Hero", 1999) as Officer Terry
- NYPD Blue ("Twin Petes", 1998) as Peter Welch
- The Keenan Ivory Wayans Show
- Beverly Hills Bordello ("Use Your Imagination", 1996) as Felix
- Sliders ("State of the A.R.T", 1996) as Scarface P.A.U.L.
- The Watcher ("The Gift", 1995)
- Compromising Situations ("The Elevator") as Emerson Sprague
- Father Dowling Mysteries ("The Devil and the Deep Blue Sea Mystery", 1990) as Roland
- Star Trek: The Next Generation ("Allegiance", 1990) as Alien 2
- In Living Color

== Theatre ==
- Godspell as Jeffrey
- Duck Hunting as Kusikov
- Equus as Alan Strang
- Bagels as President Regan
- Taming of the Shrew as Lucentio
- Passion of Dracula as Johnathan Harker
- Jesus Christ Superstar as Peter
- Kiss Me Kate as Harrison Howell
- Brigadoon

== Other works ==
- 1996 video game Fox Hunt as Alan
- Video game Phantasmagoria
- Video game X-Files Interactive Adventure as Agent Adam Burke
- Video game The Journeyman Project 3: Legacy of Time as Gage Blackwood

== Behind-the-scenes credits ==
- Pray Another Day (2003) - writer, director
- Fatal Kiss (2002, TV) - writer, director
- SFN: Science Fiction News (TV series) - co-producer
- Galaxis (1995) - stunts
- Double Impact (1991) - photo double
- The 23 Minute Comedy Hour - writer, director, producer
- Gorilla TV - writer, director, producer
