= Deepak Singh (film producer) =

Indian film producer

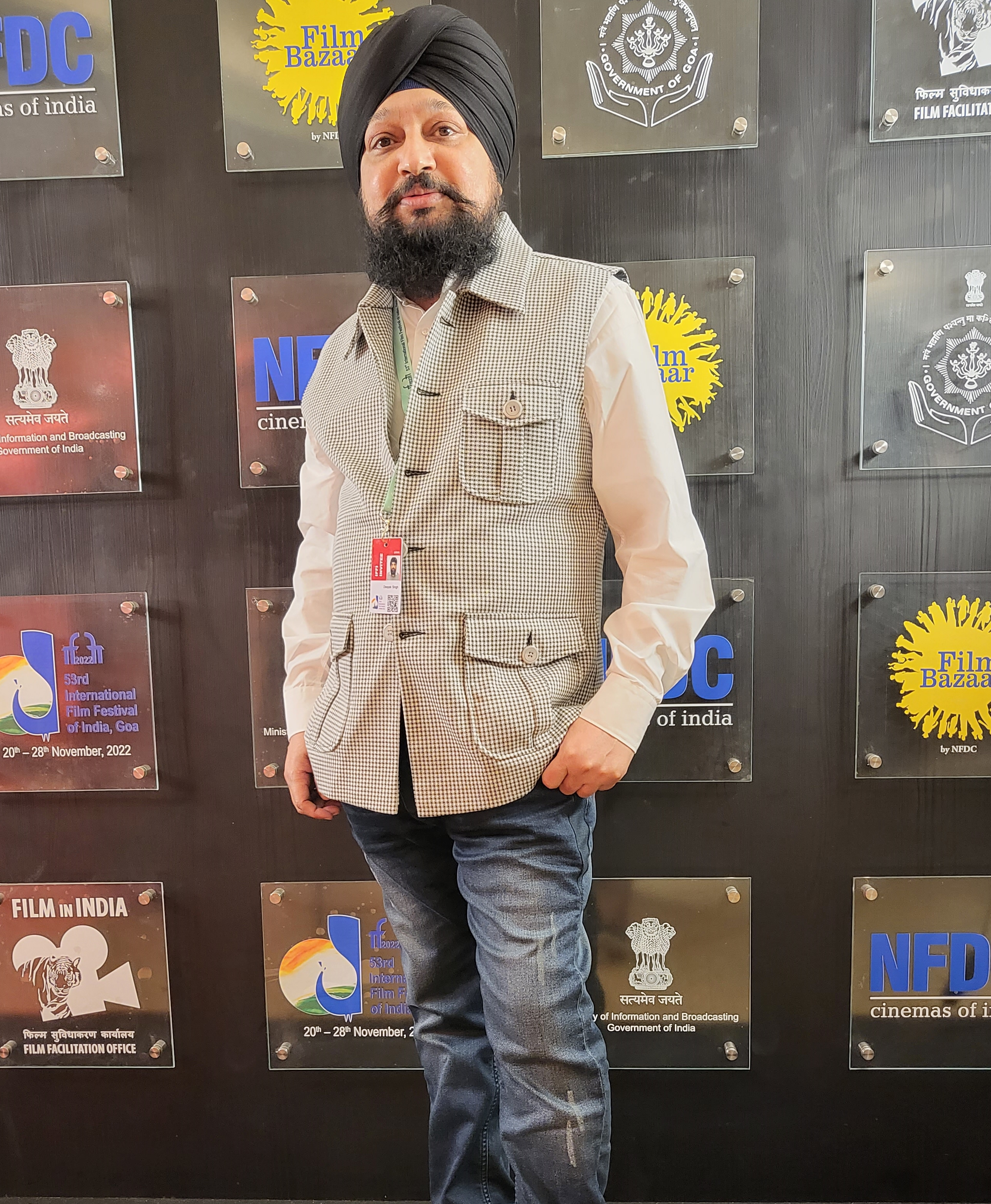
- Born: 7 April 1973 (age 53); Lucknow, India
- Occupations: Film producer, writer, author
- Known for: Soorma, Tiger, Bad President

Deepak Singh (born 7 April 1973) is an Indian film producer and writer who predominantly works in Hindi films.

== Career ==
Deepak singh started his career as a brand consultant and films marketing and promotions agent. He has done promotion of more than 800 films in Hindi and English in his career. He worked as a production controller for the films Apaharan and then Mumbai Cutting. In 2018, he produced the Bollywood film Soorma starring Diljit Dosanjh and Taapsee Pannu, based on the life of hockey player Sandeep Singh. In the same year he produced Tiger, an American sports drama film based on the subject of human rights, starring Mickey Rourke and Janel Parrish. In 2021, Deepak Singh co-produced Bad President based on the life of Donald Trump, associating with Young & Free Films LA.

In 2022, he had written, directed and produced a content-based short film 'Rakshaday Everyday'. Deepak Singh also wrote a book "Bravo Yadav" on the life of Honorary Captain Subedar Yogendra Singh Yadav, India’s youngest Param Vir Chakra recipient. He is also about to produce and release this film in 2023.

The American University presented Deepak Singh with a doctorate degree in mass media communications in recognition of his contributions to the sector.

== Filmography ==
S.No.	Year	Film	Language	Comments
1	2005	Apaharan	Hindi	Production controller
2	2008	Mumbai Cutting	Hindi	Production controller
3	2018	Soorma	Hindi	Producer
4	2018	Tiger	English	Producer
5	2019	Shauq Marran Da: Sabrina Sapal (music video)	Hindi	Producer music video
6	2019	Mast Malang (music video)	Hindi	Producer music video
7	2020	Cookiees (web series)	Hindi	Line producer
8	2020	Divine: 3:59 AM (music video)	Hindi	Producer music video
9	2021	Bad President	English	Co-Producer
10	2022	Rakshaday Everyday (short)	Hindi	Writer, director, producer
11	2022	Continuity (short)	Hindi	Writer, director, producer
12	2022	Bravo Yadav (upcoming)	Hindi	Writer, director, producer

== Bibliography ==
- "BRAVO YADAV(Journey of Honorary Captain Subedar Yogendra Singh Yadav India's Youngest Param Vir Chakra Recipient", 2022, p:178, ISBN 9391504035
