= Marilyn Eastman =

American actress (1933–2021)

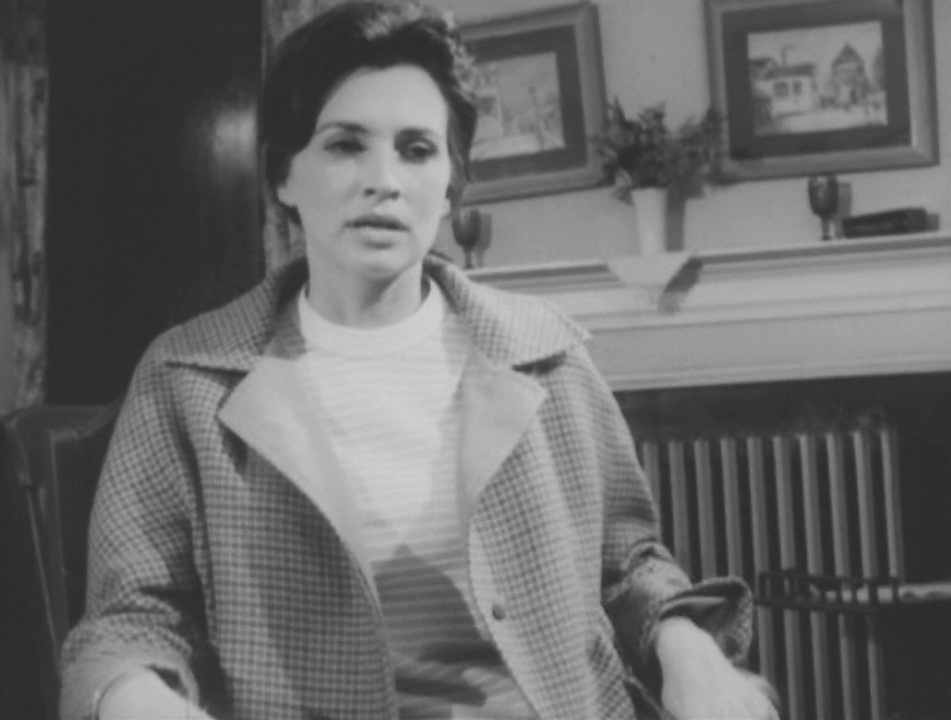
- Eastman as Helen Cooper in Night of the Living Dead (1968)
- Born: December 17, 1933; Beaver, Iowa, U.S.
- Died: August 22, 2021 (aged 87); Tampa, Florida, U.S.
- Occupation: Actress
- Years active: 1960–1996
- Children: 2

Marilyn Eastman (December 17, 1933 – August 22, 2021) was an American actress.

== Life and career ==
Eastman was born in Beaver, Iowa, on December 17, 1933, but later lived in Pittsburgh, Pennsylvania. She began her career in radio, at Pittsburgh's KQV, before joining her business partner, Karl Hardman, at the production company The Latent Image, Inc. She then began her screen career in 1960, appearing in the CBS legal drama television series Perry Mason.

Later in her career, she played the character Helen Cooper in the horror classic Night of the Living Dead in 1968, and also assisted in the film's screenwriting and make-up. She retired from acting in 1996, last appearing in the film Santa Claws.

== Death ==
Eastman died in Tampa, Florida, on August 22, 2021, at the age of 87.

== Filmography ==
- Perry Mason (1960)
- Night of the Living Dead (1968)
- Houseguest (1995)
- Santa Claws (1996)
