= Legion of the Night =

- Directed by: Matt Jaissle
- Written by: Matt Jaissle
- Produced by: Matt Jaissle
- Starring: Tim Lovelace; Jeff Rector; Ron Asheton; Heather Fine; S. William Hinzman
- Cinematography: Tom Chaney
- Edited by: Jeremy Kasten
- Music by: Paul McCollough
- Distributed by: Threat Theatre
- Release date: October 15, 1995 (U.S.)
- Running time: 85 minutes
- Language: English
- Budget: $80,000

Legion of the Night is a 1995 horror film directed by Matt Jaissle, starring Tim Lovelace, Jeff Rector, Ron Asheton, Heather Fine, and S. William Hinzman. The film revolves around a scientist (Hinzman) who experiments with reanimation of corpses, accidentally creating zombies. This technology falls into the hands of a crime lord that uses it to create a near-invincible army of thugs. The film was released on DVD in the United Kingdom as Dead City.

== See also ==
- List of zombie films
