= River of Darkness =

2011 film by Bruce Koehler

- Directed by: Bruce Koehler
- Written by: Bruce Koehler
- Produced by: Bruce Koehler
- Starring: Kurt Angle; Kevin Nash; Sid Eudy; Bill Hinzman; Bill Laing; Alan Rowe Kelly
- Music by: Rob Hurry; Wayne Hurry
- Distributed by: G2 Pictures
- Release date: March 29, 2011
- Running time: 84 minutes
- Country: United States
- Language: English

River of Darkness is a 2011 American horror film by director Bruce Koehler. The film features professional wrestling stars Kurt Angle, Kevin Nash, and Sid Eudy (credited as "Psycho Sid Vicious" on the cover art) as well as Ray Lloyd in a minor role.

== Plot ==
When unspeakable evil falls on a quiet river town, sheriff Logan (Kurt Angle) is thrust into a chilling nightmare of death and mayhem. He is confronted with a series of horrific murders, each more vicious than the last, and soon learns of the community's seedy past and the evil that has risen from purgatory to exact revenge on the town.

== Cast ==
- Kurt Angle as Sheriff Will Logan
- Kevin Nash as Jayden Jacobs
- Sid Eudy as Jonah Jacobs
- Bill Hinzman as Harvey Hix
- Bill Laing as Joseph Jacobs
- Alan Rowe Kelly as Mary Rutledge
- Bingo O'Malley as Virgil
- Ray Lloyd as Clark Higgins
- Randy Davison as State Trooper
