= Flesheater =

1988 film by Bill Hinzman

- DVD cover
- Directed by: Bill Hinzman
- Written by: Bill Hinzman
- Produced by: Bill Hinzman
- Starring: Bill Hinzman; John Mowod; Leslie Ann Wick; Kevin Kindlin; Charis Kirkpatrick Acuff; James J. Rutan
- Cinematography: Simon Manses
- Edited by: Bill Hinzman; Paul McCollough
- Music by: Erica Portnoy
- Distributed by: Magnum Entertainment (VHS); Media Blasters (DVD)
- Release date: October 1988
- Running time: 88 minutes
- Country: United States
- Language: English

Flesheater is 1988 American horror film directed, written, produced, and co–edited by Bill Hinzman. Set on Halloween, the film follows a group of college students who encounter flesh-eating zombies while traveling on an overnight hayride through the countryside. An independent production, the film also stars Hinzman, best known for playing the cemetery ghoul in George A. Romero's Night of the Living Dead (1968).

== Plot ==
The film starts with a group of college students taking a hayride in the country on Halloween. They pay the local farmer to take them to a secluded area of the forest. The students arrive and begin drinking, telling the farmer to come back in the morning to pick them up. As the party wears on the group separates to find their own little love nests.

Meanwhile, another farmer has stumbled across a large tree stump which he proceeds to remove with the help of his tractor. Under the stump is a large wooden box with an ancient seal warning not to break open the box. The farmer breaks the seal and opens the box. Inside is a dead man who proceeds to come back to life and eat the farmer making him a zombie in the process. Both zombies head towards where the kids are. At the same time, the farmer who brought the kids to the woods is also attacked by the zombies and turns into one himself.

Two of the kids who retreated to the barn for some alone time are killed by the zombies. As the lead zombie is killing the kids, two of their friends walk in and see what's happening then they run outside to warn the group at the party. Inside the barn the kids who were attacked become zombies and head out of the barn for fresh victims back near the party and one of the girls is attacked in the woods by the zombies. It tears a chunk of shoulder away but the girl is saved by her boyfriend who hears her screams and tackles the flesh-eater.

The remaining kids retreat to the old "Spencer's Farm" a vacant farmhouse in the woods. They proceed to nail up the windows and doors. They manage to phone the police but the call is cut short when a zombie outside rips the phone line out.

Meanwhile, the two kids who escaped from the barn have caught up with the group (who refuse to open the doors in case of an attack) so the two kids hide in the basement and lock the door. Upstairs the girl bitten on the shoulder dies and returns as a zombie. Just as she gets up the zombies outside break in and the remaining group are slaughtered, each becoming a zombie and heading into the woods for more victims.

A police car then turns up at Spencer's farm responding to the cut-short phone call. The police officer is attacked by a group of zombies, which includes the now zombified kids, and left for dead. The kids in the basement open the door and see the body of the policeman. They take his gun and kill his half remaining zombie corpse and escape into the night.

Some of the zombies find their way to a residential street where they proceed to eat a local family inside their home turning them into zombies in the process. The two kids find a local stable where they try to warn the owner about the coming attack. He goes inside the house to find that his wife has become a zombie. More zombies appear and the man, who tells the kids to save themselves, is cornered and eaten alive and the kids flee again.

They find a large barn where a Halloween party is being held. The kids try to warn the group about the undead but they laugh it off as Halloween nonsense. Soon the zombies arrive and slaughter the party-goers. The two kids who survived the basement find a hiding spot inside the framework of the barn.

Back in town, the police department are assembling a posse after hearing of the officer who was killed at Spencer's farm. As daylight approaches the posse have arrived at the woods. They find zombies emerging from the woods and proceed to kill the creatures. They proceed through the woodland killing zombies as they go. The posse arrive at the barn and find the party-goers are all zombies. The posse kill them as the zombie group come out of the barn. The two kids hiding in the barn hear the gunshots and think they are saved. They exit the barn and are shot on sight by a sniper who mistakes them for zombies, even after the boy pleads for mercy.

The posse throws all the bodies inside the barn and barricade it shut. They set it on fire burning the remaining few zombies inside. The posse thinking they destroyed all the zombies head home. A few days later a police officer is checking out the remains of the barn when he is attacked by the original flesheater, who survived the fire, kills the officer and begins the outbreak all over again.

== Cast ==
- Bill Hinzman as FleshEater
- John Mowod as Bob
- Leslie Ann Wick as Sally
- Kevin Kindlin as Ralph
- Charis Kirkpatrick Acuff as Lisa
- James J. Rutan as Eddie
- Lisa Smith as Kim
- Denise Morrone as Carrie
- Mark Strycula as Bill
- Kathleen Marie Rupnik as Julie
- Matthew C. Danilko as Tony
- David Ashby as Officer Harv Morgan
- Terrie Godfrey as Police Dispatcher
- Dave Kelly as Newsman
- Karen L. Gergely as Newswoman
- Bill Ingalls as News Director
- Rik Billock as Farmer Ned
- Jackie Sodergren as Farmer Jackie
- David A. Sodergren as Farmer Dave
- Tom Madden as Tractor Driver
- Allan T. Bross as Father
- Bonnie Hinzman as Mother
- Charis Kraski as Lisa
- Chris Bross as Chris, the Little Hobo
- Heidi Hinzman as Heidi, the Little Angel
- Susan Marie Spier as Susan
- Steven B. Sands as Steve, Karate guy
- Adena Dodds as Joanne, the Cheerleader
- Andrew Sands as Andy, the Vampire
- Scott Knechtel as Scott, the Big Chicken
- Taryn Thomas as Taryn, the Hula Dancer
- Paula Recchio as Paula the Witch
- Kristy Dettore as Kristy, the She-Ra
- Carl W. Sodergren as Carl, the Toga Dude
- Mark Hinzman as Mark, the Hunter
- Michele Vensko as Michele, the Ballerina
- Michael Gornick as Mad Mike (voice)
- 'Wild Bill' Laczko as Sheriff
- Vincent D. Survinski as Vince

== Production ==
Filming took place on location in rural Pennsylvania.

== Alternate titles ==
The film has been released under a number of alternate titles, including Zombie Nosh and Revenge of the Living Zombies.

== Release ==
The film was released on VHS by Magnum Entertainment under the title Revenge of the Living Zombies in 1989.

The film was released on DVD by Shriek Show in 2003. It can also be found packaged in the Zombie Pack, Vol. 2 alongside Burial Ground and Zombie Holocaust. Shriek Show released a 2-disc Blu-ray and DVD combo pack by Shriek Show in 2010.

In April 2022, Vinegar Syndrome released the film via a newly scanned and restored version from the original 16mm camera negative on 4K UHD and Blu-ray.

== Reception ==
Writing in The Zombie Movie Encyclopedia, academic Peter Dendle called it "mostly a waste of a good barn". Glenn Kay, who wrote Zombie Movies: The Ultimate Guide, said, "If the filmmakers didn't care about what they were creating, why should horror fans?"

== See also ==
- List of ghost films

== Sources ==
- Kay, Glenn (2008). Zombie Movies: The Ultimate Guide. Chicago, Illinois: Chicago Review Press. ISBN 978-1-55652-770-8.
- Dendle, Peter (2001). The Zombie Movie Encyclopedia. Jefferson, North Carolina: McFarland & Company. ISBN 978-0-7864-9288-6.
