= Bad President =

- Directed by: Param Gill
- Written by: Param Gill; John Buchanan
- Produced by: Param Gill; Deepak Singh; Robert Amico
- Starring: Jeff Rector; Eddie Griffin
- Release date: October 12, 2020
- Country: United States
- Language: English

Bad President is a 2020 American fantasy comedy film directed by Param Gill and starring Jeff Rector and Eddie Griffin. The film is produced by Param Gill, Deepak Singh and Robert Amico.

== Plot ==
Luther (the devil) is looking for a new play. One of his imps suggests Donald Trump might be the perfect agent of chaos, given his ambition to become president, and his character flaws. So he sets out to win Trump's allegiance by pressuring him through successively releasing damning information, and then making the crises go away to demonstrate his ability to deliver on promises.

Trump, coming to terms with his having little chance of winning, finally acquiesces, and the devil delivers his 2016 election victory.

== Cast ==
- Jeff Rector as Donald Trump
- Eddie Griffin as Luther, the Devil
- Stormy Daniels as herself
- Becca Buckalew
- Robert Amico
- Dawna Lee Heising

== Release ==
The film was released on VOD on October 12, 2020.

== Reception ==
Bobby LePire of Film Threat gave the film a 7 out of 10.
