= Mark Burchett =

American film director

Mark Burchett (April 20, 1960 – July 12, 2014) was a Hollywood film director, screenwriter and film producer of horror movies.

== Early life ==
Burchett was born in Cincinnati, Ohio. He was educated at Lakota High School in West Chester, Ohio and the University of Cincinnati's College Conservatory of Music with a BFA in Broadcasting and Film.

During high school he was active at the school's radio station, WLHS, as well as the drama department, where he wrote and directed a student-run play in his senior year.

While in college, he worked as a producer of public service shows at radio stations WKRC-AM and WKRQ-FM (Q102).

== Career ==
In 1994, along with his wife, Denise Burchett, and Michael D. Fox, he formed production company B+ Productions. He directed the film Satanic Yuppies that was created with Michael D. Fox, and wrote or produced other horror films including Vamps, Vamps 2 and Hammerhead. He also worked as an Art Director on the independent features, Faded and Drip. He is currently completing a film titled, Hell-o-ween.

He collaborated frequently with actress Amber Newman and actors Paul Morris and Rob Calvert. His crew often included Jeff Barklage (camera/lighting) and Eric J. Chatterjee (art/production)

The film Vamps was called "The Gone With the Wind of stripper-vampire movies" by rock legend Alice Cooper, and Vamps 2 received 3 & 1/2 stars by b-movie guru Joe Bob Briggs.

Burchett was also a founding member of the Southern Ohio Filmmakers Association and has served twice as its president. .

== Death ==
On July 12, 2014, Burchett died at the age of 54 from unknown causes.
