= Lesion network mapping =

Lesion network mapping is a neuroimaging technique that analyzes the connectivity pattern of brain lesions to identify neuroanatomic correlates of symptoms. The scientific validity of these methods has been widely disputed. The technique was developed by Aaron Boes to understand the network anatomy of lesion induced neurologic and psychiatric symptoms that can not be explained by focal anatomic localization. Lesion network mapping applies a network-based approach to identify connected brain networks, rather than focal brain regions, that correlate with a specific symptom.

In focal neuroanatomic localization, developed by Paul Broca and others, specific symptoms that occur due to brain lesions can be understood by identifying a specific brain region that is injured by lesions to establish brain-symptom relationships. However, a number of neurologic symptoms, such as peduncular hallucinosis, are not amenable to this approach since the lesions associated with the symptom do not map to one focal brain location. Lesion network mapping helps to explain these lesion-induced syndromes by showing that lesion locations associated with a given symptom all map to a shared brain network even if they do not all map to a focal brain region. The technique maps the location of lesions associated with a specific symptom and analyzes the connectivity pattern of the lesions compared to large, standardized human brain atlases. While initially developed using resting-state fMRIs such as the Human Connectome Project, the technique has been expanded to include large structural network atlases and multimodal-connectome datasets. Software tools for that facilitate lesion network mapping exist within the Lead-DBS framework, which is also used for a related technique, DBS network mapping.

Lesion network mapping has helped map the network anatomy of numerous rare neurologic syndromes (peduncular hallucinosis, delusional misidentification, reduplicative paramensia, akinetic mutism, blindsight, visual anosognosia), common neurologic syndromes (seizures, aphasia, amnesia, parkinsonism, topographical disorientation), psychiatric syndromes (depression, mania), as well as complex human behaviors (spirituality, religious fundamentalism, consciousness, free will, criminality, addiction). The technique has been successfully applied to a broad range of diseases and lesion types including lesions due to stroke, traumatic brain injury, tuberous sclerosis and multiple sclerosis. The technique has been broadened to map the connectivity of locations from transcranial magnetic stimulation and deep brain stimulation sites to understand treatment responsiveness.

Research findings based on lesion network mapping have been reported in the New York Times, Scientific American and USA Today and the term has been included in the New England Journal of Medicine's general medical glossary.
