= James Burchett =

American politician

James Charles Sholto Burchett Queen's Counsel, born in Goodooga, New South Wales, on 11 October 1930, died 30 September 2012, was Justice of the Federal Court of Australia between June 1985 and October 2000 and was president of the Australian Copyright Tribunal.

In 1996 he handed a series of judgements which delayed the start of the Super League rugby league breakaway competition.

He conducted the 2001 Inquiry into Military Justice in the Australian Defence Force, which concluded that there was not a culture of widespread or systemic avoidance of due disciplinary processes, nor the use of violence to maintain discipline, in the ADF.

Burchett was appointed as the independent code reviewer for the Australian copyright collecting societies' voluntary code of conduct, to monitor and report on compliance with the code. He was Chairperson of the Australian Electoral Commission between 2003 and 2009.

Burchett also served as a judge on the Court of Appeal of Tonga.
