= Santa Claws (1996 film) =

- DVD cover
- Directed by: John A. Russo
- Written by: John A. Russo
- Produced by: Robert V. Michelucci; John A. Russo; Jack Smith
- Starring: Debbie Rochon; John Mowood; Dawn Michelucci; Savannah Calhoun; Marilyn Eastman
- Cinematography: S. William Hinzman
- Edited by: Tara Alexander
- Music by: Paul McCollough
- Distributed by: American Home Entertainment
- Release date: October 22, 1996
- Running time: 83 minutes
- Country: United States
- Language: English

Santa Claws (also known as 'Tis the Season) is a 1996 slasher film written and directed by John A. Russo. It stars Debbie Rochon as a scream queen B-movie actress who is stalked by an obsessed fan. The film gives an insider's view of the challenges that actors and actresses face about violent stalker fans and describes the downside of fame.

== Plot ==
The story is about a horror movie actress named Raven Quinn. After her marriage crumbles down, she wins the custody of her daughters and raises them alone. She feels fortunate that she finds a good neighbor named Wayne, who provides a much needed emotional support and agrees to baby-sit her two young daughters.

Little does Raven know that Wayne has had his share of murders while growing up and has now set his eyes to stalk her. Wayne has an altar that is full of Raven's pictures and a mannequin resembling Raven in his house.

Wayne feels cheated that Raven's co-workers are sharing her attention. Feeling jealous, Wayne murders Raven's co-stars one by one while dressed in a Santa Claus costume. His weapon of choice is a "claw".

== Cast ==
- Debbie Rochon as Raven Quinn
- Grant Kramer as Wayne
- John Mowood as Eric Quinn
- Dawn Michelucci as Angela Quinn
- Savannah Calhoun as Savannah Quinn
- Marilyn Eastman as Mrs. Quinn
