= Michael D. Fox =

American neurologist

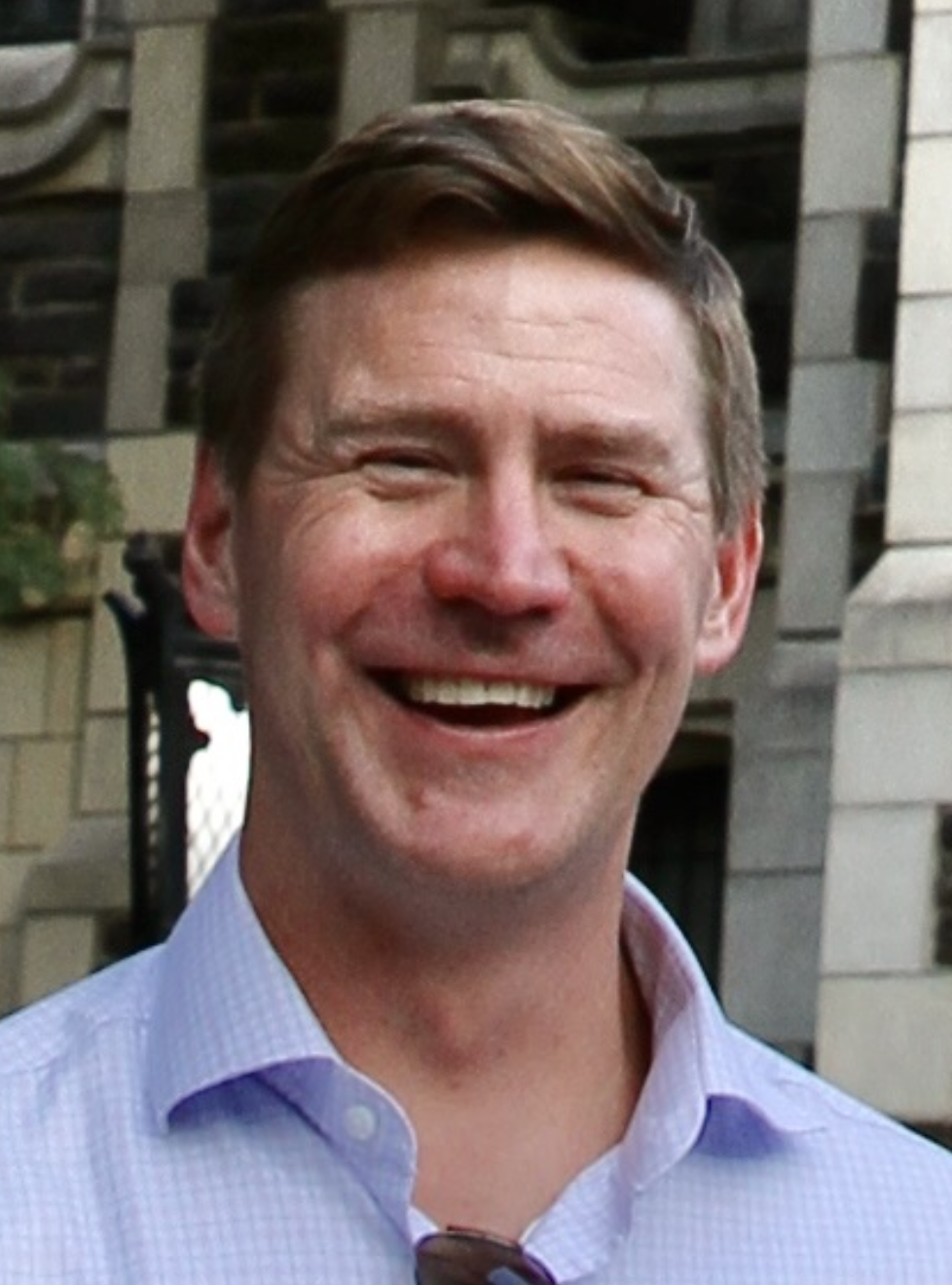
- Born: Ohio, United States
- Education: Washington University School of Medicine, Ohio State University
- Known for: Lesion network mapping, functional neuroimaging
- Awards: Foundation for the National Institute of Health Trailblazer Award, Thomson Reuters World's most influential scientific minds
- Scientific career
- Fields: Neuroimaging neurology
- Workplaces: Harvard Medical School, Brigham & Women's Hospital
- Doctoral advisor: Marcus Raichle

Michael D. Fox is an American neurologist and Professor of Neurology at Harvard Medical School where he holds the Raymond D. Adams Distinguished Chair in Neurology and directs the Center for Brain Circuit Therapeutics at Brigham and Women's Hospital. His research has focused on resting state brain fMRI which uses spontaneous fluctuations in blood oxygenation to map brain networks including the default mode network. He developed the technique lesion network mapping to study the connectivity patterns of brain lesions to help understand the neuroanatomy of a diverse range of processes including addiction, criminality, blindsight, free will and religiosity. Fox has been considered among the "World's Most Influential Scientific Minds" by Thomson Reuters since 2014.

== Education and Early Career ==
Fox received his Bachelor of Science in Electrical Engineering from Ohio State University in 2001. He then pursued his MD and PhD in Systems Neuroscience from Washington University in St. Louis, completing both degrees in 2008. He completed his residency in Neurology at Massachusetts General Hospital and Brigham and Women’s Hospital/Harvard Medical School in 2012, followed by a fellowship in Movement Disorders and Deep Brain Stimulation in 2013.

== Professional Positions and Roles ==
Fox has held various academic and clinical positions. Since 2023, he has been a full Professor of Neurology at Harvard Medical School. He founded the Center for Brain Circuit Therapeutics at Brigham and Women’s Hospital in 2020, where he also holds the Steven and Judy Kaye Directorship in Psychiatric Brain Stimulation. His previous roles include Associate Editor for Annals of Neurology, Associate Professor of Neurology and leadership in the Deep Brain Stimulation program at Beth Israel Deaconess Medical Center.

== Research Contributions ==
Fox is known for his pioneering work in brain circuit mapping and neuromodulation. He co-developed resting state functional connectivity MRI, a technique to map human brain circuits by analyzing spontaneous fluctuations in blood oxygenation levels. His research has explored how brain lesions correlate with specific brain circuits, providing insights into various neurological and psychiatric conditions such as Parkinson’s disease, depression, addiction, and epilepsy. He and his team developed methods such as lesion network mapping, DBS network mapping and TMS network mapping. He has also applied these findings to therapeutic interventions, including deep brain stimulation and transcranial magnetic stimulation.

== Selected Honors and Awards ==
- Clarivate Highly Cited Researcher (2024, 2023, 2022, 2021): Recognized among the top 0.1% of researchers worldwide.
- Trailblazer Prize (2018): Awarded by the Foundation for the National Institutes of Health for translational research.
- Inaugural International Brain Stimulation Early Career Award (2021): Awarded by Elsevier for contributions to brain stimulation research.
- Raymond D. Adams Distinguished Chair in Neurology (2020): Brigham and Women’s Hospital.

== Selected publications ==
Some of Fox’s most cited works include foundational studies on brain connectivity using rs-fcMRI, such as his 2005 PNAS paper on intrinsic brain networks or his review on lesion network mapping. His publications span top-tier journals like The New England Journal of Medicine, Nature Reviews Neuroscience, and Annals of Neurology.

- Fox MD. Mapping Symptoms to Brain Networks with the Human Connectome. N Engl J Med. 2018;379(23):2237-2245. doi:10.1056/NEJMra1706158
- Fox MDM, Snyder AZA, Vincent JLJ, Corbetta MM, Van Essen DCD, Raichle MEM. The human brain is intrinsically organized into dynamic, anticorrelated functional networks. Proc Natl Acad Sci USA. 2005;102(27):9673-9678. doi:10.1073/pnas.0504136102
- Fox MD, Buckner RL, Liu H, Chakravarty MM, Lozano AM, Pascual-Leone A. Resting-state networks link invasive and noninvasive brain stimulation across diverse psychiatric and neurological diseases. Proceedings of the National Academy of Sciences. 2014;111(41):E4367-75. doi:10.1073/pnas.1405003111
- Joutsa J, Moussawi K, Siddiqi SH, Abdolahi A, Drew W, Cohen AL, Ross TJ, Deshpande HU, Wang HZ, Bruss J, Stein EA, Volkow ND, Grafman JH, van Wijngaarden E, Boes AD, Fox MD. Brain lesions disrupting addiction map to a common human brain circuit. Nat Med. 2022;28(6):1249-1255. doi:10.1038/s41591-022-01834-y
