= Gerald Loeb Lifetime Achievement Award winners =

American journalism award

The Gerald Loeb Award is given annually for multiple categories of business reporting. Lifetime Achievement awards are given annually "to honor a journalist whose career has exemplified the consistent and superior insight and professional skills necessary to contribute to the public's understanding of business, finance and economic issues." Recipients are given a hand-cut crystal Waterford globe "symbolic of the qualities honored by the Loeb Awards program: integrity, illumination, originality, clarity and coherence." The first Lifetime Achievement Award was given in 1992.

== Gerald Loeb Lifetime Achievement Award winners (1992—present) ==
- 1992: Hobart Rowen of The Washington Post
- 1993: Carol Loomis, a member of the board of editors at Fortune magazine
- 1994: James W. Michaels, editor of Forbes magazine
- 1995: Leonard Silk (posthumously), columnist and editorial writer for The New York Times

He is "considered the father of modern economics reporting"

- 1996: Marshall Loeb, editor-at-large for Fortune magazine

He pioneeried "the customer-focus approach in business journalism that we now take for granted."

- 1997: Jane Bryant Quinn, columnist for Newsweek magazine
- 1998: Alan Abelson, columnist for Barron's

"Few journalists have been as influential as Alan Abelson. For 41 years he has given us his insights, wisdom and a moral view of a world in which ethics and straight dealings are often rare commodities."

- 1999: Stephen B. Shepard, editor in chief of Business Week magazine.

He "earned a reputation for editorial integrity and independence."

- 2000: Norman Pearlstine, editor-in-chief of Time Inc.
- 2001: Allan Sloan, the Wall Street editor of Newsweek magazine
- 2002: Paul Steiger, the managing editor of The Wall Street Journal

"On the morning of Sept. 11, Managing Editor Paul Steiger and his staff at The Wall Street Journal found themselves on the front line of a terrorists' war when they were forced to flee their office located across the street from the World Trade Center. Although their workplace was in a shambles – and still is even today – they somehow managed to publish a paper the next day.

"That demonstration of unfailing leadership by a top journalist made Steiger the unanimous and nearly instantaneous choice of 14 judges, drawn from top-tier print and broadcast media, for the 2002 Lifetime Achievement Award, the most prestigious honor of the Gerald Loeb Awards for business and financial journalism, presented annually by The Anderson School."

- 2003: Floyd Norris, chief financial correspondent of The New York Times
- 2004: Louis Rukeyser, economic commentator, financial adviser, and host of Louis Rukeyser's Wall Street on CNBC

"Long known for his ability to combine wit with wisdom, Louis Rukeyser has gained both the allegiance of viewers and the admiration of critics. As host of public television's "Wall $treet Week With Louis Rukeyser," a post he held from its debut in 1970 until it went off the air in 2002, Mr. Rukeyser each week drew the largest audience in the history of financial journalism, providing millions of viewers with economic analysis delivered in a clear and appealing style. Now he brings that same blend of entertainment, experience, information and insight to his CNBC program.

"Mr. Rukeyser's current position enables him to employ his no-punches-pulled expertise on a broad canvas. He has more than four decades of globe-ranging experience as a television, radio and newspaper correspondent. His remarkable career has straddled three distinct areas of the news: political analysis, foreign correspondence and economic interpretation. Mr. Rukeyser's ability to clarify events in a lively and insightful fashion has made him an internationally celebrated broadcaster, lecturer, editor and author."

- 2005: Byron E. "Barney" Calame, public editor at The New York Times

"Great editors are usually defined by the great stories they have shepherded into print. Less obviously, but equally important, they can be judged by the stories they have kept out of the paper. Barney's legend at [The Wall Street Journal] is built on his talents in both realms. But Barney is perhaps best known for the way his tremendous news instincts are moored in something of incalculable value to journalism: an extraordinarily powerful moral compass."

- 2006: Myron Kandel, founding financial editor at CNN
- 2007: Matthew Winkler, editor-in-chief of Bloomberg News
- 2008: Daniel Hertzberg, deputy managing editor for international at The Wall Street Journal
- 2009: Bill Emmott, former editor-in-chief of The Economist
- 2010: Walt Bogdanich, assistant investigative editor at The New York Times
- 2011: Steven Pearlstein, columnist for The Washington Post

He "has mastered the journalistic alchemy of making subjects that are complex and opaque into columns that are understandable and compelling."

- 2012: Jerry Seib, deputy managing editor and Washington bureau chief of The Wall Street Journal
- 2013: John Huey, former editor-in-chief of Time Inc.
- 2014: James Flanigan, former business journalist at the Los Angeles Times
- 2015: James Grant, founder and editor of Grant's Interest Rate Observer
- 2016: Paul Ingrassia, managing editor of Reuters
- 2017: Walt Mossberg, executive editor of The Verge and editor-at-large for Recode
- 2018: Joann Lublin, former management news editor of The Wall Street Journal
- 2019: Martin Wolf, chief economics commentator at the Financial Times
- 2020: Lionel Barber, former editor of the Financial Times
- 2021: Ellen Pollock, business editor of The New York Times
- 2022: Michelle Singletary, personal advice columnist at The Washington Post
- 2023: Stephen J. Adler, Reuters
