= John Huey =

American publishing executive

- Born: April 18, 1948 (age 78); Atlanta, Georgia, U.S.
- Education: University of Georgia
- Occupation: Journalist
- Spouse: Kate Ellis Huey
- Children: John W. Huey IV, Cole Ellis Huey

John Huey (born April 18, 1948) is an American journalist and publishing executive who served as the editor-in-chief of Time Inc., at the time the largest magazine publisher in the United States, overseeing more than 150 titles, including Time, People, Fortune, Sports Illustrated, Entertainment Weekly and InStyle. He previously served as the editor of Fortune, Atlanta bureau chief of The Wall Street Journal and founding managing editor, and later editor, of The Wall Street Journal Europe. He co-authored the best-selling autobiography of Walmart founder Sam Walton.

== Early life ==
The son of John W. Huey and Helen Cahill Huey, Huey attended North Fulton High School, and then the University of Georgia, graduating in 1970.

== Career ==
After serving as a naval intelligence officer, he became a reporter for the Dekalb New Era, a local weekly newspaper in Georgia. Huey then joined The Atlanta Constitution, reporting on crime, politics and general features. In 1975, he joined The Wall Street Journal as a reporter in the Dallas bureau. After covering the Sandinista revolution in Nicaragua, Huey became Atlanta bureau chief of the Wall Street Journal. In 1982, he moved to Brussels to help launch the Wall Street Journal Europe as its managing editor, serving under its editor Norman Pearlstine. Huey became the paper's editor a year later. He returned to the United States in 1985 to become a senior special writer for the Wall Street Journal.

=== Southpoint and Fortune ===
In 1988, Huey joined Fortune as a senior editor in the Atlanta bureau. While at the Wall Street Journal, he had developed the idea of a Texas Monthly-style business magazine for the Southeast United States. With the backing of Fortune editor Marshall Loeb and Don Logan, CEO of Time Inc.'s Southern Progress subsidiary, Time Inc. agreed to launch Huey's new magazine idea, dubbed Southpoint. Only nine issues were produced before the magazine was shuttered. Although the magazine was not a success, Huey became known for attracting contributors like Tom Junod and Howell Raines.

After Southpoint closed, Huey returned to work for Fortune as a senior editor. In 1989, Huey convinced the reclusive Walmart founder Sam Walton to give a rare interview to Fortune Magazine. That interview eventually led to Huey co-authoring the autobiography Sam Walton: Made in America. Walton died before the book was published, but it became a best seller for several months.

Huey moved his office to New York in 1994 to become the deputy to Fortune editor Walter Kiechel. Less than a year later, Huey became editor, appointed by his former Wall Street Journal boss Norman Pearlstine, who had become editor in chief of Time Inc. Huey was credited by media journalists such as Tony Case Lori Robertson and Kurt Andersen with turning around Fortune, making it "newsier, tougher, sexier, funnier, excellent", according to Anderson, writing in New York (magazine). During his tenure, cover stories included "The Scariest S.O.B. on Wall Street", “Addicted to Sex: Corporate America's Dirty Secret”, and "The Most Powerful Women in Business." He also recruited new reporters for Fortune including from GQ, Forbes, The Wall Street Journal, and Time. New writers included Joe Nocera, Nina Munk, Stanley Bing, and Stewart Alsop. And he was credited with featuring more women and minorities on the Fortune cover, disproving previous thinking that such covers didn't sell well.

He was named Editor of the Year by Advertising Age in 1996 and by Adweek in 1998. The Columbia Journalism Review named Huey one of the top 10 magazine editors in the United States. In 2001, Time Inc. created the Fortune Group and Huey was placed in charge of Fortune, Money, Business 2.0, Fortune Small Business and Mutual Fund magazine.

=== Time Inc. Management ===
Replacing journalist Walter Isaacson, who left to head CNN, Huey was promoted to editorial director of Time Inc. later in 2001. Editor-in-chief Pearlstine stepped back to larger strategic matters and gave Huey editorial control over Time, Sports Illustrated, the Fortune Group, and with another editor, the lifestyle titles, including People, InStyle and Real Simple. Within his first year, he had named new editors at People, Sports Illustrated and InStyle. His appointment of Time Inc. outsiders, such as Terry McDonell, former editor of Us Weekly and Esquire Magazine, to become editor of Sports Illustrated, bypassing the traditional Time Inc. promote-from-within practice, was seen as indicative of his editorial activism.

He took the top editorial job at Time Inc. in 2006, becoming the company's sixth editor in chief since it was founded, with oversight of 3500 journalists. As editor-in-chief, he created the CNNMoney website with Turner Broadcasting System, combining editorial content from CNN, Fortune and Money. The website ended up making more money than both magazines. In 2009, during the Great Recession, Huey had Time Inc. buy a house in the very depressed city of Detroit and staffed it up with reporters to cover the city for multiple Time Inc. publications. In an interview with New York Magazine after becoming editor-in-chief, Huey described Time Inc. as having a "public trust." "Some magazines have importance beyond profitability," he said. However, while the company was earning more than a billion dollars of profit on $5.6 billion of revenue when Huey became editor-in-chief, the seven-years of his tenure was a period of rapid contraction of the magazine industry and he laid off almost a third of the staff from core Time Inc. magazines such as Time, People, Fortune and Money.

In 2010, Huey became a member of a three-person management committee acting as temporary CEO of Time Inc. He retired from the company at the end of 2012, saying, at the time, "Google sort of sucked all the honey out of our business." After the company was sold to the Meredith Corporation in 2017 for $2.8 billion, the Columbia Journalism Review reported that Huey tweeted "R.I.P. Time Inc. The 95-year run is over.”

=== Subsequent career ===
Huey became a 2013 Shorenstein Fellow at the John F. Kennedy School of Government at Harvard University. While there, he co-authored Riptide - An Oral History of the Epic Collision Between Digital Technology and the News Business. The oral history project included interviews with 61 media and technology leaders about disruption in the news business. The project was later expanded to include a second volume of interviews with technology journalists. In 2013, Huey received the Gerald Loeb Lifetime Achievement Award for Distinguished Business and Financial Journalism from the UCLA Anderson School of Management.

Huey served as member of the Council on Foreign Relations, the advisory board of the Poynter Institute and the Peabody Awards. He hosted the Whole Hog podcast, about Southern culture, for Garden & Gun.

== Personal life ==
Huey is married to Kate Ellis Huey. He has two children. In the 11 years he ran editorial operations for Time Inc., he commuted from his home in Charleston, South Carolina, spending weekdays in New York and weekends in Charleston.
