= Tecumseh, Nebraska =

- City
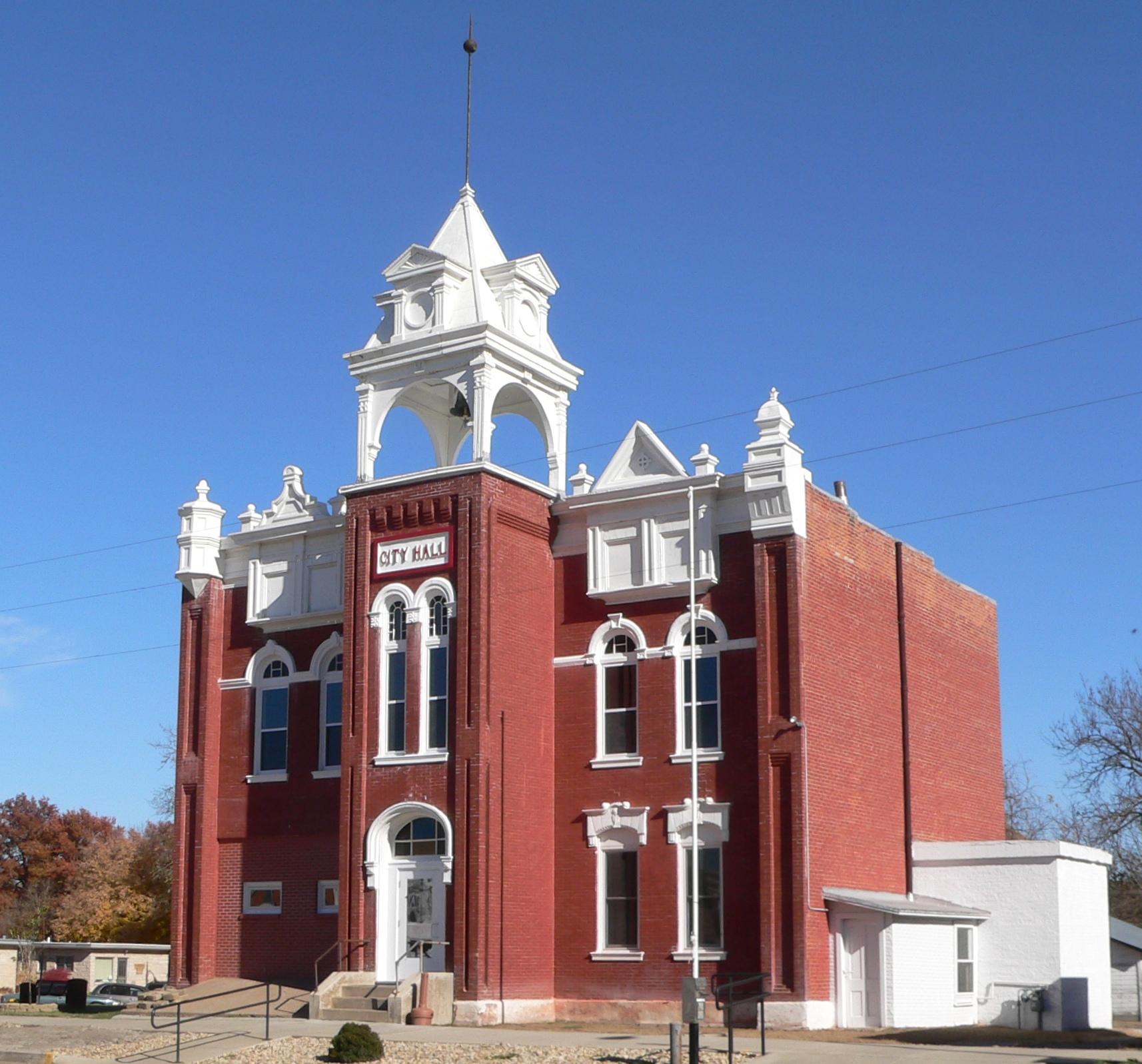
- Tecumseh City Hall

- Location within Johnson County (left) and Nebraska (right)
- Coordinates: 40°22′19″N 96°11′19″W
- Country: United States
- State: Nebraska
- County: Johnson
- Named for: Tecumseh

Area
  - Total: 1.51 sq mi (3.91 km^{2})
  - Land: 1.51 sq mi (3.91 km^{2})
  - Water: 0 sq mi (0.00 km^{2})
- Elevation: 1,129 ft (344 m)

Population (2020)
  - Total: 1,694
  - Density: 1,121.1/sq mi (432.87/km^{2})
- Time zone: UTC-6 (Central (CST))
  - Summer (DST): UTC-5 (CDT)
- ZIP code: 68450
- Area code: 402
- FIPS code: 31-48480
- GNIS feature ID: 2396036
- Website: tecumsehne.com

Tecumseh is a city in and the county seat of Johnson County, Nebraska, United States. As of the 2020 census, Tecumseh had a population of 1,694.

== History ==
Tecumseh was originally called Frances, and under the latter name was established in 1856. The label of Frances has long been falsely attributed as the name of the wife of Col. Richard M Johnson, the namesake of Johnson County. Johnson's only marriage was to Julia Chinn, a common-law spouse. Julia Chinn, was an octoroon slave (one-eighth African, seven-eighths European in ancestry), born into slavery around 1790. Some historians have accepted the possibility that the legislature intended to name the county seat after Francis Burt, the first Governor of the Nebraska Territory. Shortly after being founded, the name was changed to Tecumseh after the Native American Chief said to have been killed by Johnson during the Battle of the Thames. The Nebraska Territorial Legislature established Tecumseh as the county seat in February 1857.

== Geography ==
According to the United States Census Bureau, the city has a total area of 1.50 square miles (3.88 km^{2}), all land.

=== Climate ===
Climate data for Tecumseh 1S, Nebraska (1991–2020, extremes 1893–present)
Month	Jan	Feb	Mar	Apr	May	Jun	Jul	Aug	Sep	Oct	Nov	Dec	Year
Record high °F (°C)	72 (22)	79 (26)	96 (36)	99 (37)	105 (41)	108 (42)	112 (44)	110 (43)	107 (42)	98 (37)	84 (29)	79 (26)	112 (44)
Mean maximum °F (°C)	59.5 (15.3)	64.9 (18.3)	77.9 (25.5)	85.3 (29.6)	90.6 (32.6)	94.4 (34.7)	99.3 (37.4)	98.1 (36.7)	93.9 (34.4)	87.4 (30.8)	73.5 (23.1)	63.0 (17.2)	99.8 (37.7)
Mean daily maximum °F (°C)	35.2 (1.8)	40.3 (4.6)	52.6 (11.4)	63.8 (17.7)	73.6 (23.1)	83.4 (28.6)	87.9 (31.1)	86.2 (30.1)	79.3 (26.3)	66.9 (19.4)	51.8 (11.0)	39.6 (4.2)	63.4 (17.4)
Daily mean °F (°C)	24.0 (−4.4)	28.5 (−1.9)	40.3 (4.6)	51.0 (10.6)	62.0 (16.7)	72.1 (22.3)	76.5 (24.7)	74.3 (23.5)	65.9 (18.8)	53.1 (11.7)	39.6 (4.2)	28.5 (−1.9)	51.3 (10.7)
Mean daily minimum °F (°C)	12.7 (−10.7)	16.8 (−8.4)	27.9 (−2.3)	38.3 (3.5)	50.3 (10.2)	60.8 (16.0)	65.0 (18.3)	62.5 (16.9)	52.5 (11.4)	39.3 (4.1)	27.4 (−2.6)	17.4 (−8.1)	39.2 (4.0)
Mean minimum °F (°C)	−9.2 (−22.9)	−2.6 (−19.2)	8.0 (−13.3)	21.8 (−5.7)	34.6 (1.4)	47.1 (8.4)	53.4 (11.9)	50.8 (10.4)	36.1 (2.3)	22.5 (−5.3)	11.0 (−11.7)	−1.9 (−18.8)	−12.9 (−24.9)
Record low °F (°C)	−27 (−33)	−34 (−37)	−22 (−30)	2 (−17)	21 (−6)	34 (1)	41 (5)	38 (3)	23 (−5)	0 (−18)	−10 (−23)	−29 (−34)	−34 (−37)
Average precipitation inches (mm)	0.81 (21)	1.14 (29)	2.05 (52)	2.92 (74)	5.29 (134)	4.25 (108)	4.00 (102)	3.65 (93)	2.74 (70)	2.58 (66)	1.57 (40)	1.27 (32)	32.27 (820)
Average snowfall inches (cm)	6.7 (17)	6.4 (16)	2.0 (5.1)	1.1 (2.8)	0.0 (0.0)	0.0 (0.0)	0.0 (0.0)	0.0 (0.0)	0.0 (0.0)	0.4 (1.0)	1.9 (4.8)	3.9 (9.9)	22.4 (57)
Average precipitation days (≥ 0.01 in)	5.3	6.1	7.3	9.3	10.7	9.6	9.3	8.2	7.2	6.7	5.6	5.4	90.7
Average snowy days (≥ 0.1 in)	3.1	3.0	1.3	0.3	0.0	0.0	0.0	0.0	0.0	0.2	1.0	2.2	11.1
Source: NOAA

== Demographics ==
Historical population
Census	Pop.	Note	%±
1880	1,268		—
1890	1,654		30.4%
1900	2,005		21.2%
1910	1,748		−12.8%
1920	1,688		−3.4%
1930	1,829		8.4%
1940	2,104		15.0%
1950	1,930		−8.3%
1960	1,887		−2.2%
1970	2,058		9.1%
1980	1,926		−6.4%
1990	1,702		−11.6%
2000	1,716		0.8%
2010	1,677		−2.3%
2020	1,694		1.0%
U.S. Decennial Census

=== 2010 census ===
As of the census of 2010, 1,677 people, 722 households, and 447 families resided in the city. The population density was 1,118.0 inhabitants per square mile (431.7/km^{2}). The 887 housing units averaged 591.3 per square mile (228.3/km^{2}). The racial makeup of the city was 82.5% White, 0.4% African American, 0.1% Native American, 3.2% Asian, 12.9% from other races, and 0.8% from two or more races. Hispanics or Latinos of any race were 16.2% of the population.

Of the 722 households, 27.4% had children under the age of 18 living with them, 48.9% were married couples living together, 9.1% had a female householder with no husband present, 3.9% had a male householder with no wife present, and 38.1% were not families; 33.2% of all households were made up of individuals, and 17.6% had someone living alone who was 65 years of age or older. The average household size was 2.25 and the average family size was 2.86.

The median age in the city was 44.8 years; 22.1% of residents were under the age of 18; 6.5% were between the ages of 18 and 24; 21.5% were from 25 to 44; 26.5% were from 45 to 64; and 23.3% were 65 years of age or older. The gender makeup of the city was 47.9% male and 52.1% female.

=== 2000 census ===
As of the census of 2000, 1,716 people, 729 households, and 446 families resided in the city. The population density was 1,159.5 inhabitants per square mile (447.7/km^{2}). The 854 housing units averaged 577.0 per square mile (222.8/km^{2}). The racial makeup of the city was 86.36% White, 0.06% African American, 0.58% Native American, 5.59% Asian, 5.07% from other races, and 2.33% from two or more races. Hispanics or Latinos of any race were 6.53% of the population.

Of the 729 households, 28.8% had children under the age of 18 living with them, 50.9% were married couples living together, 7.0% had a female householder with no husband present, and 38.7% were not families. About 34.6% of all households were made up of individuals, and 21.1% had someone living alone who was 65 years of age or older. The average household size was 2.27 and the average family size was 2.93.

In the city, the population was distributed as 24.0% under the age of 18, 6.1% from 18 to 24, 24.4% from 25 to 44, 20.6% from 45 to 64, and 25.0% who were 65 years of age or older. The median age was 42 years. For every 100 females, there were 82.6 males. For every 100 females age 18 and over, there were 79.9 males.

As of 2000, the median income for a household in the city was $31,844, and for a family was $42,337. Males had a median income of $27,228 versus $19,896 for females. The per capita income for the city was $16,194. About 8.4% of families and 11.9% of the population were below the poverty line, including 17.0% of those under age 18 and 10.1% of those age 65 or over.

== In the media ==
The town was used largely for the setting of the miniseries Amerika, which depicted life in a small American town after a successful takeover by the Soviet Union.

== Tecumseh Airport ==
Tecumseh is home to the Tecumseh Airport, a private-use airport with one 3500 x 75 foot concrete runway that was resurfaced in 2008. In 2009, the airport expanded to include rent-able hangars. The airport can service any plane up to light twin-engine aircraft.

== Education ==
Tecumseh is in Johnson County Central Public Schools.

It was in Tecumseh Public Schools until 2007.

== Notable people ==
- Dennis Aust, baseball player
- Betsy Baker, oldest ever verified person in the world at the time of her death in 1955 aged 113
- Tony Davis, professional football player
- Peirson M. Hall, a federal judge who lived in a Tecumseh orphanage
- Jennie Florella Holmes, temperance activist
- Walter Kiechel III, managing editor of Fortune magazine, author of The Lords of Strategy, born in Tecumseh
- Virgil A. Martin, Los Angeles, California, City Council member (1927–31), born in Tecumseh
- Ronald Schafer, electrical engineer and author of many textbooks on digital signal processing and audio analysis
- Bob Stitt, college football coach.
- Clyde Summers, labor lawyer and law professor, subject of In re Summers
- Roy E. York, Minnesota state legislator and farmer

== See also ==
- National Register of Historic Places listings in Johnson County, Nebraska
