= Henry A. Grunwald =

American journalist and diplomat (1922–2005)

Henry Grunwald
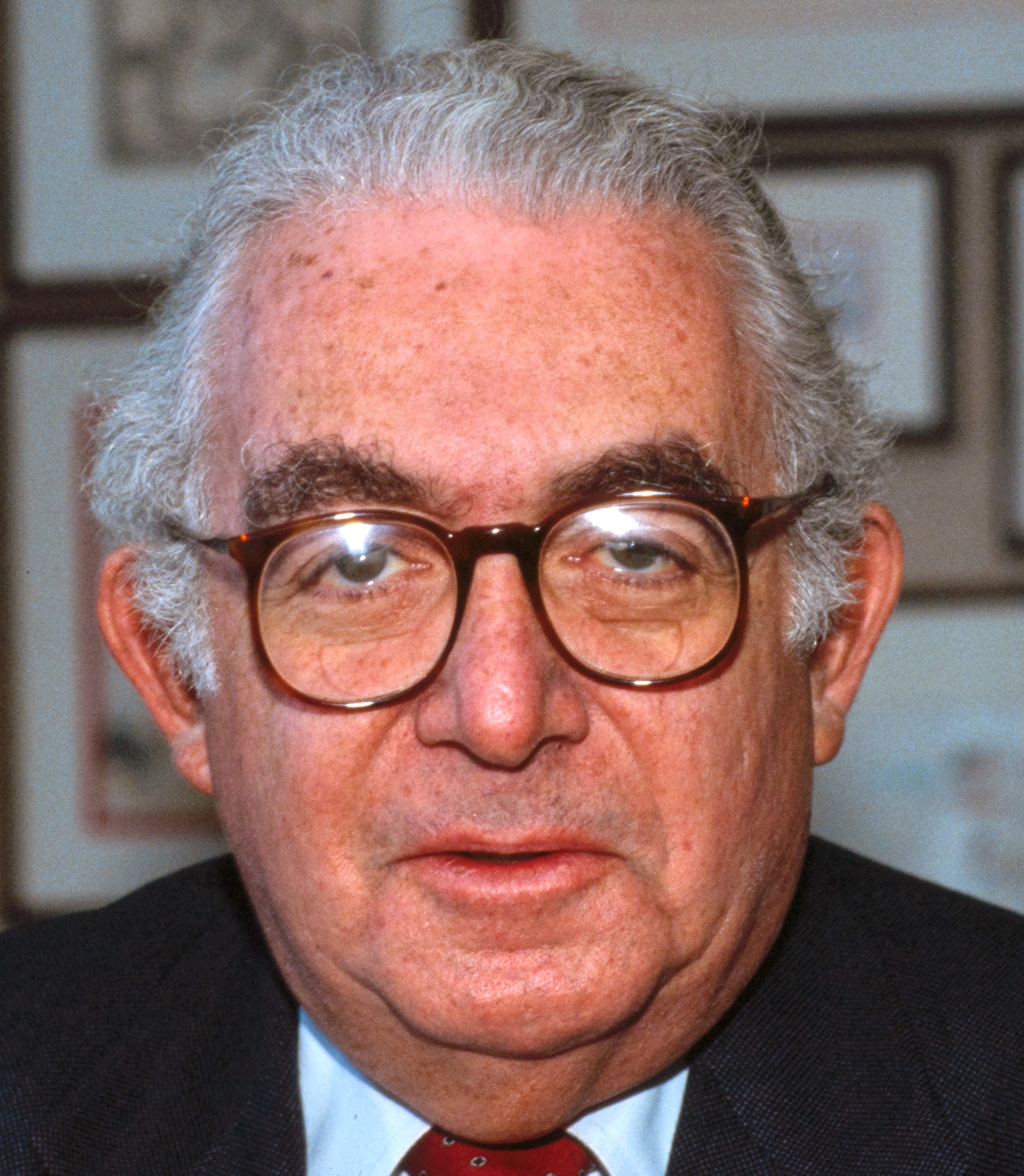
- Grunwald in 1983

United States Ambassador to Austria
- In office December 23, 1987 – January 1, 1990
- President: Ronald Reagan; George H. W. Bush
- Preceded by: Ronald S. Lauder
- Succeeded by: Roy M. Huffington

Personal details
- Born: Heinz Anatol Grünwald; December 3, 1922 Vienna, Austria
- Died: February 26, 2005 (aged 82) New York City, U.S.
- Party: Republican
- Spouse(s): Beverly Suser; Louise Melhado
- Occupation: Diplomat, editor

Henry Anatole Grunwald (December 3, 1922 – February 26, 2005) was an Austrian-born American journalist and diplomat. He was best known for his position as managing editor of Time magazine and editor in chief of Time, Inc.

In 2001, he was awarded the Austrian Cross of Honour for Science and Art, 1st class.

== Career ==
Grunwald was born Heinz Anatol Grünwald to a secular Jewish family in Vienna. His father, Alfred Grünwald, wrote libretti for operettas by Lehár, Kálmán and Oscar Straus. His mother was Mila Löwenstein. After the 1938 Anschluss the family left Austria for Czechoslovakia and then Paris. In 1940 they arrived in the United States via brief periods in Biarritz, Casablanca, and Lisbon.

Grunwald had ambitions to be a playwright, and got a job as a copy boy at Time while studying at New York University. He worked his way up at Time magazine and was succeeded as editor-in-chief by Jason McManus upon his retirement in 1987. He was the first to give Time writers bylines, a practice which had not been allowed previously. He also introduced new departments such as Behavior, Energy, The Sexes, Economy and Dance. He ordered the famous (some say infamous) cover article, "Is God Dead?" He moved the magazine away from Republican partisanship. He personally wrote the Time editorial calling for President Richard Nixon to resign.

As managing editor, and then editor-in-chief, Grunwald directed the writing an intellectual level upwards, using his intellectual rigor to evaluate each proposed story. He wanted his magazine to identify, and help promote moralistic solutions to current national problems.

In 1962 he edited and wrote the introduction to "Salinger, a Critical and Personal Portrait", a collection of essays about J.D. Salinger which includes previously published essays by John Updike, Leslie Fiedler and Joan Didion, among others, as well as Time's own article about the writer.

After serving 11 years as Time's managing editor, Grunwald took on the role of editor-in-chief of all of Time, Inc.'s magazines, including Fortune, Sports Illustrated, People and Money. In 1987 President Ronald Reagan appointed him U.S. Ambassador to his native Austria, a post he held until 1990.

External videos
- Booknotes interview with Grunwald on One Man's America: A Journalist's Search for the Heart of His Country, February 2, 1997, C-SPAN

On September 5, 1998, Grunwald released his auto-biography One Man's America, describing his emigration to America, and his life in the States. He also wrote a novel, A Saint, More or Less, which was published in 2003.

In his final years Grunwald was gradually losing his eyesight due to macular degeneration, a condition he wrote about in Twilight: Losing Sight, Gaining Insight (1999). This led to his close relationship with the noted non-profit Lighthouse International. Annually The Lighthouse awards The Henry A. Grunwald Award for Public Service to those whose actions benefit society as a whole or, more specifically, benefit those with vision impairment issues. Grunwald is both the namesake and first recipient of this award.

== Personal life and death ==
In 1953, Grunwald married Beverly Suser. They had three children, screenwriter Peter Grunwald, Democratic political consultant Mandy Grunwald, and writer Lisa Grunwald. They were married until her death of breast cancer in 1981.

In 1987, he married former Vogue editor and Manhattan socialite Louise Melhado (nee Liberman). This was her third marriage, as she had previously been married to Richard Savitt and Frederick A. Melhado.

Grunwald died in New York City on February 26, 2005, at the age of 82.

== Selected bibliography ==
- Salinger, a Critical and Personal Portrait, edited by Henry Anatole Grunwald. New York: Harper & Row, 1962.
- One Man's America. New York: Doubleday, 1997
- "Foreign policy under Reagan II". Foreign Affairs 63.2 (1984): 219-239.
- "The post-Cold War press: A new world needs a new journalism". Foreign Affairs (1993): 12-16.

Diplomatic posts
Preceded by Ronald S. Lauder	U.S. Ambassador to Austria; 1987–1990	Succeeded by Roy M. Huffington
