= Peter Grunwald =

American film producer

Peter Grundwald
- Occupation: Film producer

Peter Grunwald is an American film producer, known for his work with director George A. Romero. He produced several of Romero's films, most notably three entries in the Dead series as well as a few documentaries. He is the son of the late Henry Grunwald, former editor-in-chief of Time magazine and Beverly Suser; he is the brother of Lisa and Mandy Grunwald.

== Filmography ==
- Monkey Shines (executive producer)
- Bruiser (producer)
- Land of the Dead (producer)
- Diary of the Dead (producer)
- One for the Fire: The Legacy of Night of the Living Dead (executive producer)
- Survival of the Dead (executive producer)
