= Roy M. Huffington =

American oilman

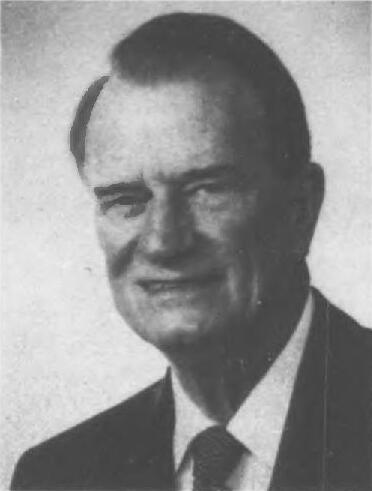

United States Ambassador to Austria
- In office August 6, 1990 – March 1, 1993
- President: George H. W. Bush
- Preceded by: Henry Anatole Grunwald
- Succeeded by: Swanee Grace Hunt

Personal details
- Born: Roy Michael Huffington; October 4, 1917 Tomball, Texas, U.S.
- Died: July 11, 2008 (aged 90) Venice, Italy
- Resting place: Glenwood Cemetery, Houston, Texas, U.S.
- Party: Republican
- Spouse: Phyllis Gough (died 2003)
- Children: 2, including Michael
- Education: Southern Methodist University; Harvard University
- Occupation: Oilman; Geologist

Military service
- Branch/service: United States Navy

Roy Michael Huffington (October 4, 1917 – July 11, 2008) was an American oilman originally from Tomball in Harris County, Texas, who later served as United States Ambassador to Austria.

== Early career ==
Huffington was born in Tomball, Texas. He graduated from Southern Methodist University where he was a brother of the Alpha Tau Omega fraternity. He earned both Master of Arts and PhD degrees in geology from Harvard University in Cambridge, Massachusetts. After serving as, first ensign and then lieutenant commander in the United States Navy from 1942–1945, he returned to Texas in 1946 and worked as a field geologist for Humble Oil, now known as Exxon, U.S.A.

== HUFFCO ==
In 1956, he set up his own oil and natural gas exploration company known as Roy M. Huffington, Inc. (Huffco). Huffco grew to be a major independent international oil company active around the world. In 1966 HUFFCO signed production sharing contract with Pertamina to explore oil in the Kutai Basin of the Mahakam River delta in East Kalimantan, Indonesia. Initially the exploration object was oil, but finally Huffco discovered a giant natural gas reserve in 1972 at Badak Field. Then Huffco and Pertamina initiated to build an LNG plant in Bontang. First shipping was in August 1977, only five years after discovery.

== Later career ==
In 1990, all properties of the company were sold to the Chinese Petroleum Corporation of Taiwan and HUFFCO became VICO.

From 1990 to 1993, Huffington served as Ambassador to Austria in the administration of U.S. President George Herbert Walker Bush. He then returned to Houston and resumed the position of chairman of the board and chief executive officer of Roy M. Huffington, Inc., an independent international oil company.

== Philanthropy ==
Roy Huffington joined the Board of the Salzburg Global Seminar, an international policy center based in Salzburg, Austria, with offices in Washington, D.C., while serving as U.S. Ambassador to Austria. In 1994, he was elected chairman of the Salzburg Global Seminar Board, a position which he held until 2007. Huffington also served as the chairman of the Asia Society, a New York-based charity, for seven years in the 1980s.

He also founded the Huffington Foundation, a Houston-based charity.

He and his wife, the former Phyllis Gough, who died in 2003, created the Huffington Center on Aging at the Baylor College of Medicine in Houston.

Huffington, having been a member of the Alpha Tau Omega fraternity at SMU, donated a significant (undisclosed) amount of money to the Alpha Tau Omega Educational Foundation, which provides collegiate scholarships for undergraduate members of the fraternity.

== Personal life ==
Roy and Phyllis Huffington had two children: Terry Dittman, whose family lives in Houston, and Michael Huffington (born 1947), who was a Republican U.S. representative from California from 1993-1995. In 1994, Michael Huffington narrowly lost the election for the United States Senate to Democrat Dianne Feinstein. Michael Huffington was married to Arianna Huffington from 1986-1997. Arianna Huffington, an unsuccessful candidate for governor of California in the 2003 recall election, is the founder of the Huffington Post.

Roy Huffington died of natural causes in Venice, Italy.

== Honors ==
- 1986, Golden Plate Award of the American Academy of Achievement
- 1987, The John Rogers Award, the Institute for Energy Law
- 1992, Texas Business Hall of Fame

Diplomatic posts
Preceded by Henry Anatole Grunwald	U.S. Ambassador to Austria; 1990–1993	Succeeded by Swanee Grace Hunt
