= Dennis Aust =

American baseball player (born 1940)

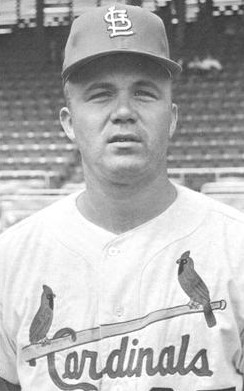
- Pitcher
- Born: November 25, 1940 (age 85); Tecumseh, Nebraska, U.S.
- Batted: Right Threw: Right

MLB debut
- September 6, 1965, for the St. Louis Cardinals

Last MLB appearance
- May 7, 1966, for the St. Louis Cardinals

MLB statistics
- Win–loss record: 0–1
- Earned run average: 5.82
- Strikeouts: 14
- Stats at Baseball Reference

Teams
- St. Louis Cardinals (1965–1966)

Dennis Kay Aust (born November 25, 1940) is an American former Major League Baseball pitcher. Aust played in 15 games, all as a reliever, for the St. Louis Cardinals in 1965 and 1966. He batted and threw right-handed, stood 5 feet 11 inches (1.80 m) tall and weighed 180 pounds (82 kg).

A native of Tecumseh, Nebraska, Aust graduated from George D. Chamberlain High School in Tampa and attended the University of Florida. He was signed by the Cardinals in 1961 and spent five full years their farm system before a stellar 1965 season in the Double-A Texas League and Triple-A International League earned him a call-up to St. Louis.

In his 15 MLB relief appearances, Aust posted a 0–1 won–lost record and a 5.82 earned run average, with two saves. In 17 career innings pitched, he surrendered 18 hits and eight bases on balls with 14 strikeouts.

Aust's only decision came on the Cardinals' opening day in 1966 when he pitched three innings in relief of Joe Hoerner. After getting the first two batters out in the top of the 12th inning, he surrendered a hit to Dick Allen followed by an intentional walk to Bill White. Pinch-hitter John Herrnstein's RBI single scored Allen, leading to the Philadelphia Phillies' 3–2 victory.

Aust's professional baseball career concluded in 1968.

== See also ==
- List of Florida Gators baseball players
