= Joann Lublin =

American journalist and author

Lublin's signature

Joann S. Lublin is an American journalist and author. She is a regular contributor at The Wall Street Journal, after being a reporter and editor at the Journal from 1971 to 2018. She is the author of Earning it: Hard-Won Lessons from Trailblazing Women at the Top of the Business World (2016) and Power Moms: How Executive Mothers Navigate Work and Life (2021).

== Journalism career ==
After getting her bachelor's degree in journalism from Northwestern University and then her master's degree in communications from Stanford University, she worked as a reporter in the San Francisco, Chicago and then Washington, D.C. bureaus. While there, she covered labor issues and house and urban affairs.

In 1987, she became news editor of The Wall Street Journal's London bureau. In 1988, she became the London deputy bureau chief. She was the first woman to run a Wall Street Journal bureau.

In 1990, she transferred to the New York bureau as a senior special writer covering management. Two years later, she became deputy management editor.

In 2016, Joann published "Earning it: Hard-Won Lessons from Trailblazing Women at the Top of the Business World." The book was the result of interviews Joann conducted with over fifty executive women about career obstacles they overcame.

In 2018, the Wall Street Journal published a video narrated by Joann about her experience in a male dominated field, the stories she's written and her hopes for women in business. As of 2019, although she has retired as the management news editor at The Wall Street Journal, she still writes the career advice column, "Your Executive Career," that she started in 1993.

== Awards ==
In 2003, Joann shared The Wall Street Journal's Pulitzer Prize for stories about corporate scandals in America. These scandals included WorldCom Inc., Tyco International Ltd., Vivendi Universal SA and ImClone Systems Inc.

In 2018, she won the Lifetime Achievement Award from the Gerald Loeb Awards, the Pulitzer of business journalism.
