= Roy E. York =

American politician (1879–1955)

Member of the Minnesota House of Representatives from the 12th district
- In office January 5, 1943 – January 6, 1947

Personal details
- Born: December 3, 1879 Tecumseh, Nebraska, U.S.
- Died: April 8, 1955 (aged 75) Murray County, Minnesota, U.S.
- Children: 7
- Education: Nebraska State Normal College
- Occupation: Politician, farmer

Roy E. York (December 3, 1879 – April 8, 1955) was an American politician and farmer who served in the Minnesota House of Representatives from 1943 to 1947, representing the 12th legislative district of Minnesota in the 53rd and 54th Minnesota Legislatures.

== Early life and education ==
York was born in Tecumseh, Nebraska, on December 3, 1879. He attended Nebraska State Normal College.

== Career ==
York served on the Lake Wilson, Minnesota, school board for nine years.

York served in the Minnesota House of Representatives from 1943 to 1947, representing the 12th legislative district of Minnesota in the 53rd and 54th Minnesota Legislatures.

During his time in office, York served on the following committees:

- Aircraft and Airways (1943–1944)
- Commercial Transportation (1943–1944)
- Education (1943–1946)
- Markets and Marketing (1943–1944)
- Public Domain (1943–1946)
- Agriculture (1945–1946)
- Aviation (1945–1946)
- Transportation (1945–1946)

York's tenure began on January 5, 1943, and concluded on January 6, 1947. His district included representation for Murray County.

Outside of the Minnesota Legislature, York was a farmer.

== Personal life and death ==
York was married and had seven children. He settled in Lake Wilson, Minnesota, in 1914.

York died at the age of 75 in Murray County, Minnesota, on April 8, 1955.

Minnesota House of Representatives
Preceded by —	Member of the Minnesota House of Representatives from the 12th district 1943–1947	Succeeded by —
