= Martin Wolf =

British journalist (born 1946)

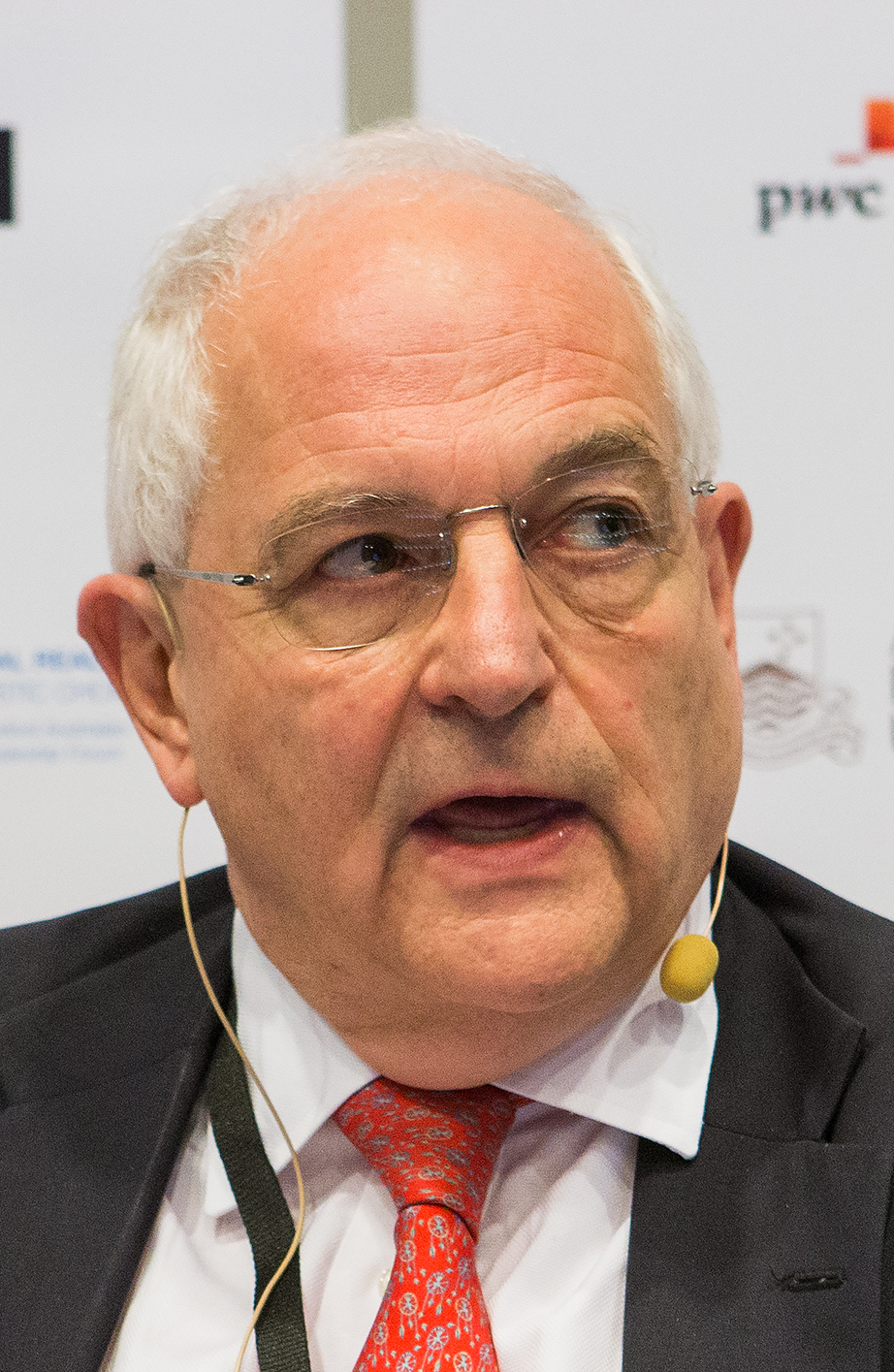
- Wolf in 2015
- Born: Martin Harry Wolf; 16 August 1946 (age 80); London
- Citizenship: British
- Education: University College School
- Alma mater: University of Oxford (BA, MPhil)
- Occupation: Journalist
- Spouse: Alison Margaret Potter (m. 1970)
- Writing career
- Subject: Economics
- Notable awards: Gerald Loeb Lifetime Achievement Award (2019)
- Website: www.ft.com/martin-wolf

Martin Harry Wolf CBE (born 16 August 1946 in London) is a British journalist who focuses on economics. He is the chief economics commentator at the Financial Times. He also wrote a weekly column for the French newspaper Le Monde until 2016.

== Early life and education ==
Wolf was born in London, in 1946. His father Edmund was an Austrian Jewish playwright who migrated from Vienna to England before World War II. In London, Edmund met Wolf's mother, a Dutch Jew who had lost nearly thirty close relatives in the Holocaust. Wolf recalls that his background left him wary of political extremes and encouraged his interest in economics, as he felt economic policy mistakes were one of the root causes of World War II. He was an active supporter of the Labour Party until the early 1970s.

Wolf was privately educated at University College School, a day school for boys in Hampstead in north west London, and the University of Oxford where in 1967 he was a student of Corpus Christi College, Oxford for his undergraduate studies. He initially read classics before switching to Philosophy, Politics and Economics. As a postgraduate student, Wolf moved on to Nuffield College, Oxford, which he left with a Master of Philosophy degree (MPhil) in economics in 1971. Wolf has said that he never pursued a PhD because he "didn't want to become an academic".

== Career ==
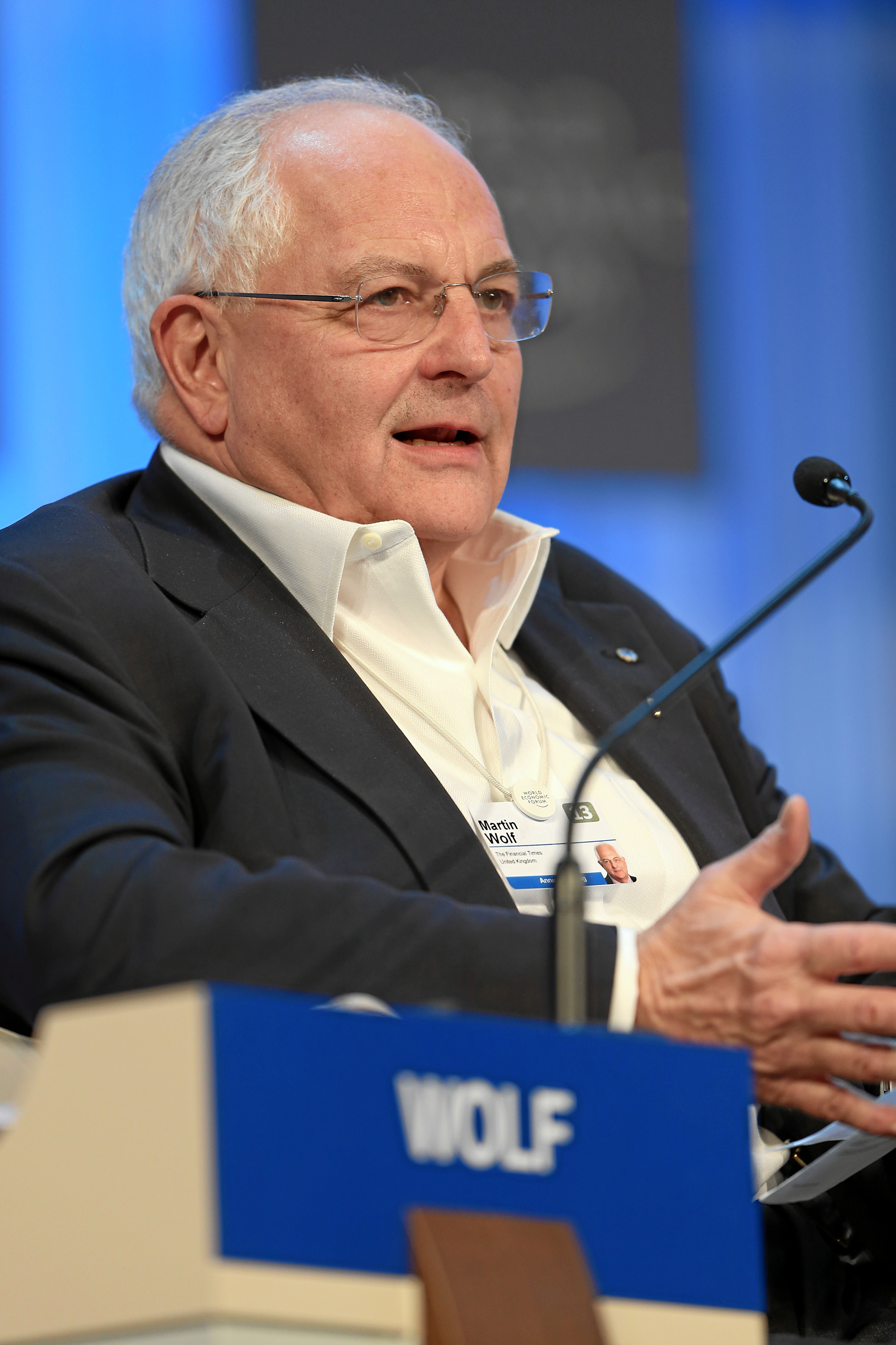
Wolf at the World Economic Forum in 2013.

In 1971, Wolf joined the World Bank's young professionals programme, becoming a senior economist in 1974. By the start of the eighties, Wolf was deeply disillusioned with the Bank's policies undertaken under the direction of Robert McNamara: the Bank had been strongly pushing for increased capital flows to developing countries, which had resulted in many of them suffering debt crises by the early 1980s. Seeing the results of misjudged intervention by global authorities and also influenced from the early 1970s by various works critical of government intervention, such as Friedrich Hayek's The Road to Serfdom, Wolf shifted his views towards the right and the free market.

Wolf left the World Bank in 1981, to become Director of Studies at the Trade Policy Research Centre, in London. He joined the Financial Times in 1987, where he has been associate editor since 1990 and chief economics commentator since 1996. Up until the late 2000s, Wolf was an influential advocate of globalisation and the free market.

In addition to his journalism and participation in various international forums, Wolf had also attempted to influence opinion with his books; he has stated that his 2004 book, Why Globalization Works, was intended to be a persuasive work rather than an academic study. By 2008, Wolf had become disillusioned with theories promoting what he came to see excessive reliance on the private sector. While remaining a pragmatist free of binding commitments to any one ideology, Wolf's views partially shifted away from free market thinking back to the Keynesian ideas he had been taught while young.

Wolf became one of the more influential drivers of the 2008–2009 Keynesian resurgence, and in late 2008 and early 2009, he used his platform on the Financial Times to advocate a massive fiscal and monetary response to the 2008 financial crisis. According to Julia Ioffe writing in 2009 for The New Republic, he was "arguably the most widely trusted pundit" of the crisis. Wolf is a supporter of a land value tax.

Between 2010 and 2011, Wolf served on the Independent Commission on Banking. In 2012, Wolf stated in remarks for the Financial Times that public goods are building blocks of civilisation: security and safety, knowledge and science, a sustainable environment, trust, the Rechtsstaat, and economic and financial stability. Wolf discussed the economic impact of the COVID-19 pandemic in an April 2020 editorial for the Financial Times titled "The world economy is now collapsing", where he called it the "biggest economic disaster since the Depression of the 1930s".

=== Views ===
Wolf maintained in December 2022 the government's failure to maintain real pay in the public sector had an adverse effect on recruitment and retention of staff. Since 2010 real average pay rose 5.5% in the private sector till September 2022, but fell 5.9% in the public sector. If it wanted to, the government could raise taxes to pay for pay rises. There were too few key public sector staff and their quality raised concerns. NHS England data "show a vacancy rate of 11.9 per cent as at September 30 2022 within the Registered Nursing staff group (47,496 vacancies). This is an increase from the same period in the previous year, when the vacancy rate was 10.5 per cent (39,931 vacancies)." Moreover, too few teachers were recruited in subjects like physics or design and technology. Poor health damaged labour supply. Allowing inflation to bring real pay down and expecting services to maintain or improve standards was in Wolf's opinion "plainly dishonest." Wolf stated the government should keep public sector pay comparable with private sector pay particularly where there are noteworthy recruitment and retention issues.

=== Awards and honours ===
Wolf was joint winner of the Wincott Foundation senior prize for excellence in financial journalism in both 1989 and 1997. He won the RTZ David Watt memorial prize in 1994. In 2000. Wolf was awarded the CBE (Commander of the Order of the British Empire). He was awarded the honorary degree of Doctor of Letters, honoris causa, by the University of Nottingham in 2006, and was made Doctor of Science (Economics) of University of London, honoris causa, by the London School of Economics in the same year. In 2018, on the occasion of the KU Leuven Patron Saint's Day he received a doctorate honoris causa of the university

Wolf is a regular participant in the annual Bilderberg meetings of politicians and bankers. He is visiting fellow of Nuffield College, Oxford, a Special Professor at the University of Nottingham and an honorary fellow of the Oxford Institute for Economic Policy. He has been a forum fellow at the annual meeting of the World Economic Forum in Davos since 1999. Wolf has been named in the top 100 lists of global thinkers by Prospect and by Foreign Policy magazine.

Wolf is regarded as "staggeringly well connected" within financial circles. His friends include leading financiers such as Mohamed A. El-Erian; politicians such as Manmohan Singh, Timothy Geithner and Ed Balls; many leading economists; central bankers such as Mervyn King: according to Wolf, he knows all significant central bankers. Despite Wolf's close connections with the powerful, he is trusted for his independence and is known to criticise initiatives promoted by his friends when he considers it to be in the public interest. Wolf is widely regarded as one of the most influential economics journalists in the world. Lawrence H. Summers has called him "the world's preeminent financial journalist." Mohamed A. El-Erian, former CEO of PIMCO, said Wolf is "by far, the most influential economic columnist out there". Paul Krugman wrote of him that "Wolf doesn't even have a PhD. And that matters not at all; what he has is a keen sense of observation, a level head, and an open mind."

Prospect magazine described him as "the Anglosphere's most influential finance journalist", while economist Kenneth Rogoff has said, "He really is the premier financial and economics writer in the world." In 2012, he received the Ischia International Journalism Award. In 2019, Wolf received the Gerald Loeb Lifetime Achievement Award from the UCLA Anderson School of Management.

=== Publications ===
- The Resistible Appeal of Fortress Europe
- Why Globalization Works
- Fixing Global Finance
- The Shifts and the Shocks: What We’ve Learned—and Have Still to Learn—from the Financial Crisis
- The Crisis of Democratic Capitalism

== Personal life ==
Wolf married Alison Margaret Potter in 1970 and they have three children.
