= Nightingale-Bamford School =

Girls school in Manhattan, New York, US

The Nightingale-Bamford School
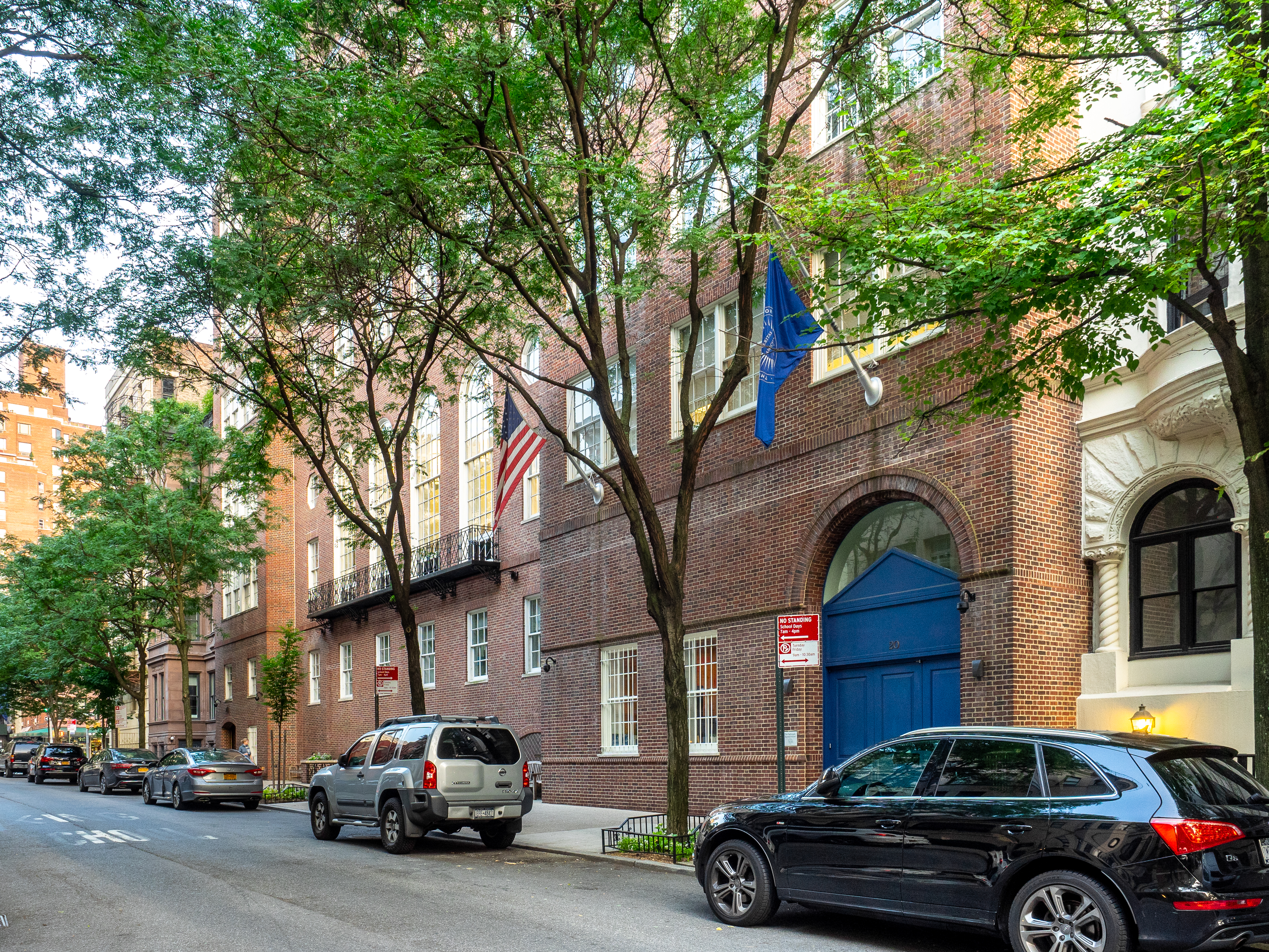
- (2019)

Location
- 20 East 92nd Street; New York, New York 10128; U.S. 40°47′05″N 73°57′24″W

Information
- Type: Private, girls
- Established: 1920
- Founder: Frances Nicolau Nightingale and Maya Stevens Bamford
- Faculty: 92 (65 of which are full-time)
- Grades: K-12
- Enrollment: 686
- Colors: Coral Silver and Blue
- Mascot: Nighthawks
- Newspaper: The Spectator
- Website: Nightingale.org

The Nightingale-Bamford School is an independent all-female university-preparatory school founded in 1920 by Frances Nicolau Nightingale and Maya Stevens Bamford. Located on Manhattan's Upper East Side, it is a member of the New York Interschool consortium.

== Overview ==
Nightingale's Lower School includes grades K-4. Middle School includes grades 5–8, and Upper School includes grades 9–12. As of 2021, Nightingale enrolls 686 students, the student-faculty ratio is 6:1, and the average class size is 12. Nightingale ranks among the best all-girls private schools in the United States, and, like many Manhattan private schools, is one of the most expensive. Very few students may enroll, as tuition is high and space is limited.

== History ==
Frances Nicolau Nightingale and Maya Stevens Bamford founded the school in 1920. NBS was originally named Miss Nightingale's School, officially becoming "The Nightingale-Bamford School" in 1929. Since 1920, NBS has graduated nearly 3,000 alumnae. As of 2008, its endowment was $74.9 million.

== Technovation Challenge ==
In 2013, a team of five upper school students won first place at Technovation Challenge, the world's largest tech competition for girls. The $10,000 prize was used to develop and market their winning app.

== Admissions and financial aid ==
Nightingale-Bamford's admissions process has received attention for its strict, high-stakes nature.

As of the 2020–2021 school year, 20% of the student body received financial assistance, with $5.9 million in grants awarded.

== Diversity ==
Over 30% of Nightingale-Bamford's student body is students of color. NBS recruits from the inner-city program Prep for Prep, a leadership development program that offers promising students of color access to a private school education based in New York City.

== Partner schools ==
Nightingale-Bamford has no official partner or brother school, but it has activities with St. David's and Allen-Stevenson (both boys' schools) and is a member of Interschool, which organizes programs and activities for eight New York City independent schools: Trinity, Dalton, Collegiate, Brearley, Chapin, Spence, Nightingale-Bamford, and Browning.

== Notable alumnae ==
- Millicent Fenwick, 1928 – politician
- Amina Gautier – author
- Isabel Gillies, 1988 – author, actress
- Lisa Grunwald, 1977 – novelist
- Mandy Grunwald, 1975 – political consultant and media advisor
- Shoshanna Lonstein Gruss, 1993 – fashion designer
- Sophie von Haselberg – actress, daughter of Bette Midler
- Renne Jarrett – actress
- Sakina Jaffrey – actress
- Alexa Ray Joel – model, daughter of Billy Joel and Christie Brinkley
- Sally Kirkland – actress
- Signe Nielsen, New York Public Spaces landscape architect
- Olivia Palermo, 2004 – socialite and fashion influencer
- Michèle Rosier, 1948 – fashion journalist
- Beatriz Stix-Brunell – ballet dancer
- Sarah Thompson, 1997 – actress
- Tschabalala Self, 1990 – artist
- Gloria Morgan Vanderbilt, 1921 – socialite
- Dana Wilkey – The Real Housewives of Beverly Hills cast member
- Cecily von Ziegesar, 1988 – author of Gossip Girl series

== In pop culture ==
- In the Gossip Girl book series by NBS alumna Cecily von Ziegesar '88, the character's elite all-girls school, Constance Billard School for Girls, is based on Nightingale-Bamford and its students' lives. "[Constance Billard] is completely based on Nightingale", von Ziegesar told ABC News. "But I exaggerated to make it more entertaining."
