= Stephen B. Shepard =

American business journalist and academic (b.1939)

- Born: July 30, 1939 (age 87); New York City, U.S.
- Education: City College of New York (BA); Columbia University (MA)
- Occupations: Business journalist and academic
- Known for: Editor-in-chief of BusinessWeek magazine and founding dean of the CUNY Graduate School of Journalism
- Spouse: Lynn Povich (m. 1979)
- Children: 2

Stephen B. Shepard (born July 30, 1939) is an American business journalist and academic who served as editor-in-chief of BusinessWeek magazine and was the founding dean of the CUNY Graduate School of Journalism.

Born and raised in New York City, Shepard attended the Bronx High School of Science. He received his undergraduate degree from the City College of New York and was awarded a master's degree from Columbia University. He married fellow Newsweek senior editor Lynn Povich on September 16, 1979, at a ceremony officiated by Rabbi Balfour Brickner. They have two adult children.

Shepard was a senior editor at Newsweek and an editor of the Saturday Review. Shepard established and directed the Knight-Bagehot Fellowship in Economic and Business Journalism at the Columbia University Graduate School of Journalism from 1971 to 1976 and served as an adjunct professor of the school's faculty. The Knight-Bagehot Fellowship is a one-year program that allows business journalists to take a series of classes through the School of Journalism in business, law and international affairs. From 1984 to 2005, Shepard was the editor-in-chief of BusinessWeek.

City University of New York trustees selected Shepard to serve as the inaugural dean of the CUNY Graduate School of Journalism in November 2004. The school was to start with an enrollment of 50 students in August 2006 and expand to a total of 200 students. Shepard told employees that at BusinessWeek that he was disappointed to leave the magazine, but had been drawn to the academic post by the way it combined journalism, public education and New York City, three things that he cared a great deal for. Stephen J. Adler of The Wall Street Journal was named to succeed Shepard as editor in chief at BusinessWeek. Shepard served as dean of the CUNY Graduate School of Journalism until December 31, 2013, but remained on the faculty.

Shepard has written three books. The first, Deadlines and Disruption: My Turbulent Path From Print to Digital, was published in 2012 by McGraw-Hill. (The Washington Post, November 2, 2012.) His second book, A Literary Journey to Jewish Identity: Re-Reading Bellow, Roth, Malamud, Ozick, and Other Great Jewish Writers, was published in 2018. And his third book, Second Thoughts: On Family, Friendship, Faith, and Writers, was published in 2021.

Shepard received the Gerald Loeb Lifetime Achievement Award in 1999. He was president of the American Society of Magazine Editors from 1992 to 1994 and was selected in 1999 for inclusion in its hall of fame. The Magazine Publishers of America chose Shepard as one of two recipients of the 2000 Henry Johnson Fisher Award. He is also a member of the Council on Foreign Relations, an influential foreign policy think tank.
