= Alison Wolf, Baroness Wolf of Dulwich =

British economist (born 1949)

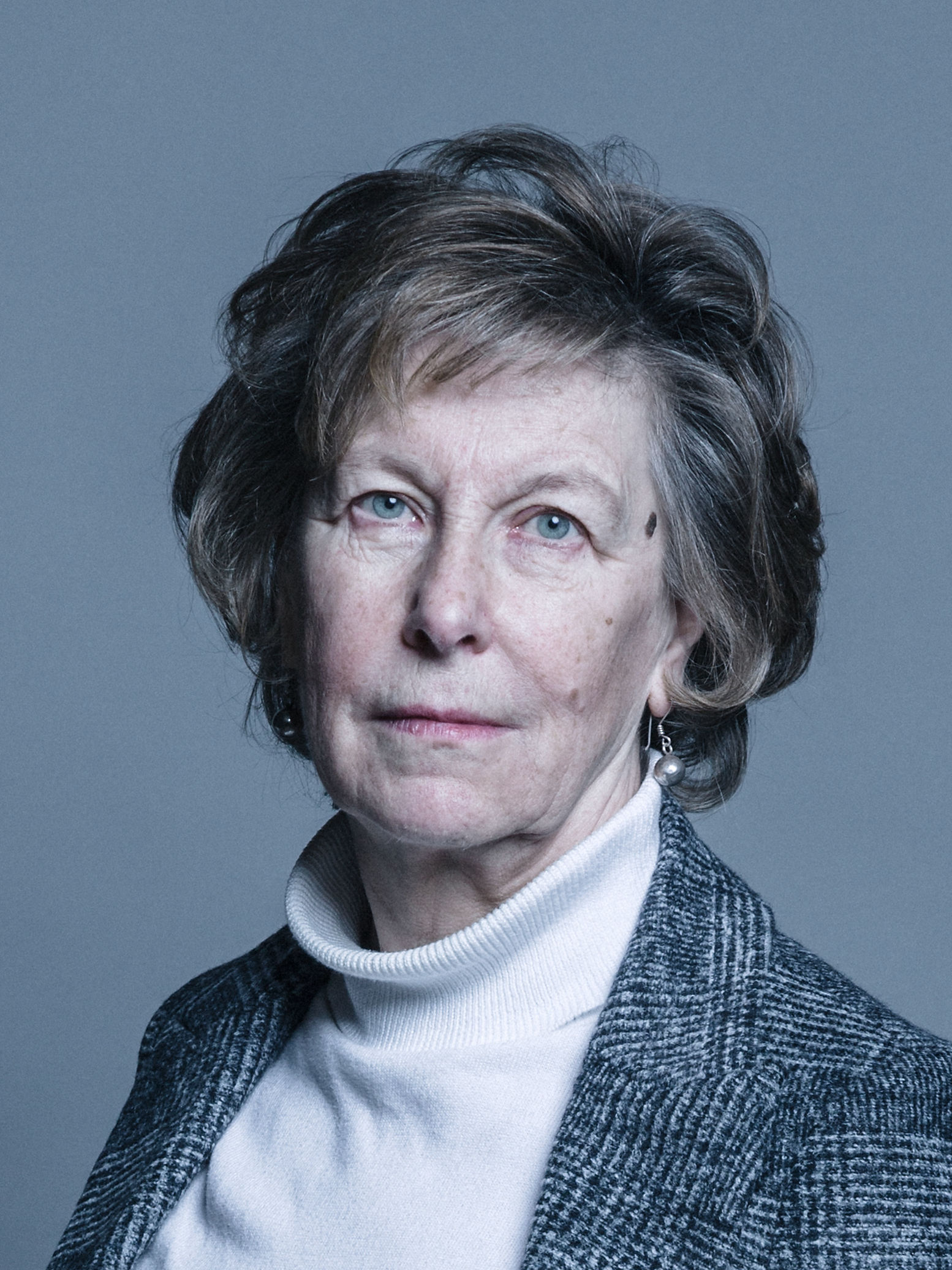
- Alison Wolf in 2018
- Born: Alison Margaret Potter; 31 October 1949 (age 76); England
- Education: Oxford High School
- Alma mater: University of Neuchatel; University of Oxford
- Occupations: Educator, economist
- Spouse: Martin Wolf (m. 1970)
- Children: 3

Member of the House of Lords
- Lord Temporal
- Life peerage 2 December 2014
- Website: www.kcl.ac.uk/people/alison-wolf

Alison Margaret Wolf, Baroness Wolf of Dulwich, DBE (née Potter, born 31 October 1949) is a British economist, academic, and life peer. She is the Sir Roy Griffiths Professor of Public Sector Management at King's College London; Director of the International Centre for University Policy Research, King's Policy Institute; and Director of the university's MSc program in Public Sector Policy and Management. Her book, The XX Factor, was published in 2013.

== Early life and education ==
Alison Potter was born on 31 October 1949. She was educated at Oxford High School, an all-girls private school in Oxford, England. She went on to study at the University of Neuchatel and the University of Oxford as an undergraduate at Somerville College, Oxford.

== Career ==
Her review of vocational education commissioned by the British Department of Education.

She spent her early career in the United States as a policy analyst for the federal government and later worked at the Institute of Education, University of London. She has advised the OECD, the Royal College of Surgeons, the education ministries of New Zealand, France and South Africa, the European Commission, the International Accounting Education Standards Board and the Bar Council.

Wolf studies the interface between educational institutions and labour markets. She also has a research interest in performance studies, maths education, training, tertiary education and employment in the health sector.

In her book, Does Education Matter? Myths about Education and Economic Growth, she questioned the widespread view that higher public expenditure on education would increase economic growth. Instead, the causality ran in the opposite direction. For the individual, the crucial skills in the labour market are primarily the mathematical and linguistic skills that are taught in school. She therefore recommends investment in primary and secondary education rather than the tertiary level. In 2013, her book The XX Factor was published by Profile Books.

On 21 October 2014, it was announced that Wolf was to become a Crossbench life peer, having been nominated personally by Prime Minister David Cameron. She was created Baroness Wolf of Dulwich, of Dulwich in the London Borough of Southwark on 2 December 2014.

=== Honours and awards ===
Wolf was appointed Commander of the Order of the British Empire (CBE) in the 2012 Birthday Honours for services to education. She is an Honorary Fellow of Somerville College, Oxford.

=== Publications ===
- Competence-Based Assessment (Assessing Assessment), Open University Press (1995)
- Convergence and Divergence in European Education and Training Systems (with Green, A. and Leney, T.), Institute of Education (1999).
- Does Education Matter?: Myths About Education and Economic Growth, Penguin (2002).
- An Adult Approach to Further Education: How to Reverse the Destruction of Adult and Vocational Education, Institute of Economic Affairs (2009).
- Improving skills at work (with Evans, K.), Routledge (2010).
- The Wolf report - Review of Vocational Education, UK Department for Education (2011).
- The XX Factor, Profile Books (2013).

== Personal life ==
Wolf is married to the economics journalist Martin Wolf. They have had three children together, two boys and a girl.
