= Tschabalala Self =

American artist (born 1990)

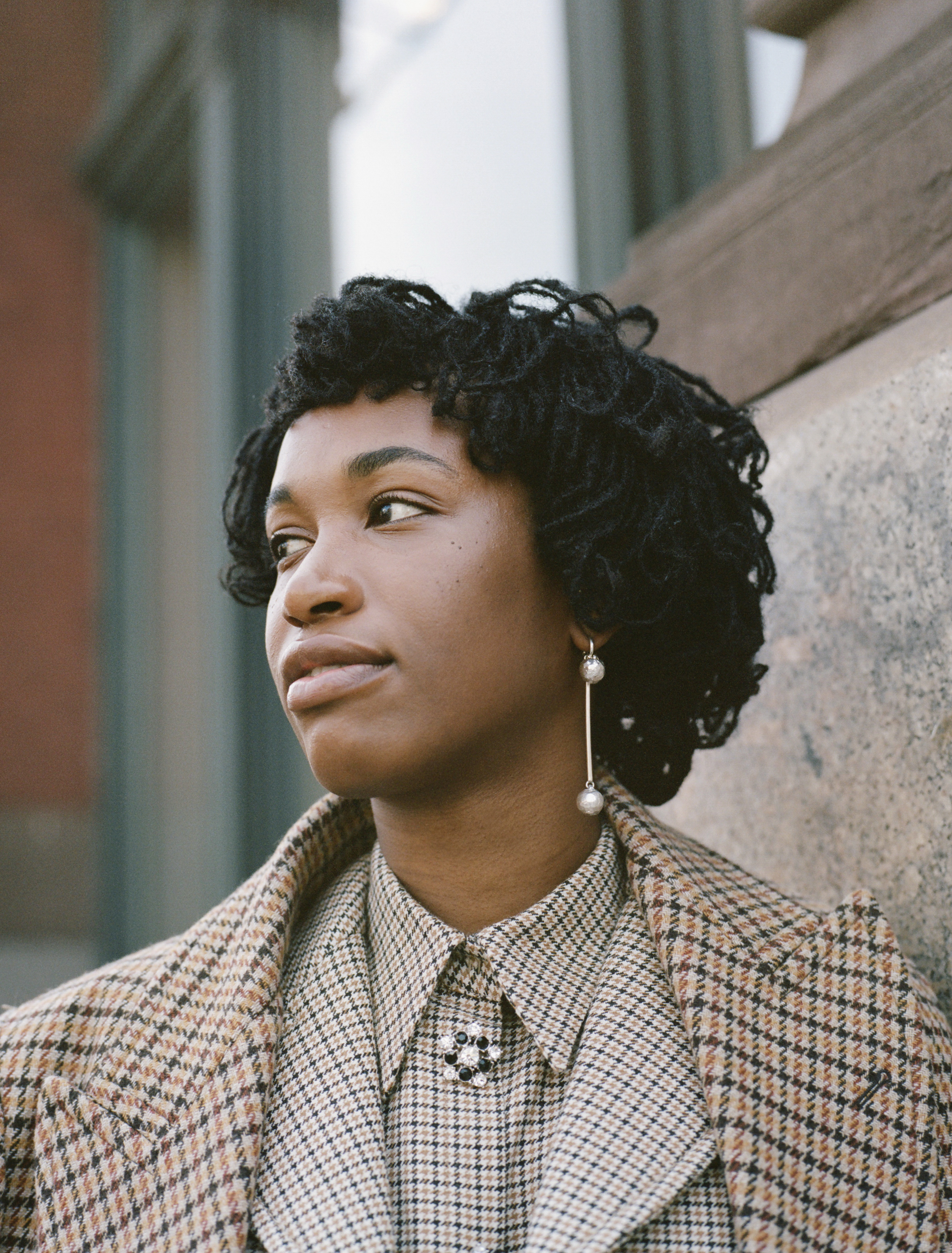
- Self in 2017
- Born: 1990 (age 35–36); Harlem, New York, U.S.
- Education: Nightingale-Bamford School; Bard College; Yale School of Art
- Occupation: Artist
- Known for: Painting
- Website: tschabalalaself.com

Tschabalala Self (born 1990) is an American artist best known for her depictions of Black female figures using paint, fabric, and discarded pieces of her previous works. She has been commissioned for public sculptures in the UK, and her use of mixed media in her works on canvas have been described as employing a "painting language." Inspired by works by African-American artist Romare Bearden, Self creates collages of various items that she has collected over time and sews them together to depict Black female bodies that "defy the narrow spaces in which they are forced to exist". She derives the concept from the history behind the African-American struggle and oppression in society. Self reclaims the Black female body and portrays them to be free of stereotypes without having to fear being punished. Her goal is to "create alternative narratives around the Black body." Much of Self's work uses elements from Black culture to construct quilt-like portraits. Self lives in Hudson, New York.

== Early life and education ==
Tschabalala Self was born in 1990 in Harlem, New York City, the youngest of five children.

She attended Nightingale-Bamford School in Manhattan. After graduating from Bard College with a B.A. degree in 2012, Self completed her M.F.A. in painting and printmaking at the Yale School of Art.

== Career ==
Self's first solo show was in 2015 at Schur-Narula in Berlin. In a review of a solo show at Thierry Goldberg gallery in New York in 2016, The New York Times declared: "Ms. Self's work has great promise, which she is developing." Peter Schjeldahl compared her piece at the New Museum's 2017 Trigger: Gender as a Tool and a Weapon to the works of Arshile Gorky and Willem de Kooning. Self's work has also been featured in a solo exhibition at the Parasol Unit Foundation for Contemporary Art in London in 2017. It was her first exhibition in the UK. Self has also ventured into creating performance art with her play Sounding Board (2021) presented at Performa 21. In 2022, Self's first solo museum show in Europe, Make Room, opened at the Consortium Museum in Dijon, France; in 2023, the exhibition traveled to Kunstmuseum St. Gallen in Switzerland, titled Inside Out.

Self has been named to Forbes "30 Under 30 List". She has also been recognized as a Joan Mitchell Foundation Painters & Sculptors Grant recipient.

Her work was included in the 2024 exhibition Making Their Mark: Works from the Shah Garg Collection at the Berkeley Art Museum and Pacific Film Archive (BAMPFA).

In 2025, Self was featured in a solo exhibition titled "Skin Tight" at the Australian Centre for Contemporary Art (ACCA). This show marked a new milestone in Self's career as it was her first on the Australian continent.

Her piece “Art Lovers” (2026) was featured on the facade of the New Museum located on the lower east side in New York City.

In September 2026, Self's sculpture "Lady in Blue" was unveiled on the Fourth Plinth in Trafalgar Square, London. The bronze sculpture, depicting a contemporary "everywoman", is the 16th work commissioned for the Fourth Plinth programme.

== Artistic style ==
Self has said, "I use materials in an unconventional way to subvert the status quo. You don't have to use paint to make a painting. It aligns with my overall message, which is one of change." The use of unconventional materials helps to highlight the unique shapes of a body because it separates the emphasis of each part from the whole structure of the artwork and creates an individual space for the pieces to express, rather than to perform, for the audience. Self starts her artwork with a line drawing of the character she wants to illustrate, then takes different objects to create her collage of items to go over that drawing. She uses shapes to build her characters while emphasizing objects or parts of the body that might be noticed first or carry a psychological or physical weight to them.

Several of Self's works are sexually explicit. Her Rainbow piece, which consists of wood, acrylic paint, and other elements, portrays a Black woman bending down, exposing her genitalia. Swim, involves a man and woman joined in a sexual act while still displaying certain parts of the body that places more emphasis, in particular, on the buttocks. The Black female bodies in her artwork are often described as nonbinary or "genderless" because they do not conform to the westernized form of beauty, usually seen in the art world.

Self's art style revolves around the representation of Black women through primary (e.g., genitalia) and secondary (e.g., body features) sexual characteristics by painting and utilizing printmaking. Through her art, Self comments upon the normalization and objectification of the body with a romanticized perspective. The characters illustrated in her artworks all share exaggerated body and facial features, and in doing so, allude to a racial and generational trauma embedded within each painting. The people in her artwork are made from different textures and prints of clothing, which emphasize and direct the attention of the audience towards the most significant part in her artwork. Her particular artistic style gravitates towards Black women embracing independence and resilience leaving a strong and fierce presence. Self's approach is most commonly androgynous and does not solely reference one gender.

== Works ==
A prominent Self work, The Function, sheds light into the social aspect of the art piece and explains the abstract nature of the figure and its background. Tschabalala states in an interview, "A stereotype is a flat character with two dimensions. And I can confront those stereotypical images by making round, multidimensional characters with complicated desires, inner dialogues, and psychology". The art piece is created by patching together pieces of old paintings, raw canvas, and fabrics which are assembled by stretching, painting and drawing over them. This gives the avatar a greater sense of dimension as it highlights the dynamic motion of turning one's back, indicated by the creased fabric.

Furthermore, Self said in an interview: "My work does not comment on stereotypes and generalizations about the Black female body, my practice absorbs these fantasies. The work is celebratory because one must thrive despite destructive rhetoric."

=== Bodega Run ===
Through her project of a series called Bodega Run, Self explores how bodies are affected by their environment, which also impacts the way the bodies move through the world itself. Bodegas are small grocery and convenience stores, that are commonly found on the east coast of America, specifically New York. Self's inspiration for this project stems from her hometown of Harlem, where bodegas were and are very common. Self, along with many others, believes that bodegas are a place where communities come together that share mutual issues, such as the issue of the oppression of people of color in America. Her Bodega project stems from this belief and her "characters populating the bodegas of Harlem, these groceries of the corner, true microcosms emblems of the Black and Latin diasporas in New York". This series includes works she calls Hammer Projects, such as Rainbow, Big Red, My Guy, Ice Cream, and Loosie in the Park. Self also includes neon light signs, consisting of words such as Abierto/ Open, Coffee/ Teas, EBT/ ATM, and Lotto, which represent the LED lights that typically reside in these facilities. As Self noted in conversation with Jareh Das for Ocula magazine,

"The bodega is an infinitely interesting locale and institution for the various racial, ethnic, and social dynamics at play within these spaces. The mere existence of these stores is deeply radicalized, given the fact that bodegas occupy neighborhoods that are generally defined as food deserts."

=== Cotton Mouth ===
The body of work presented by Self in her exhibition Cotton Mouth embodies the extraordinary experience of Black American life by connecting Black America's past to contemporary culture. She does this through the use of elements in dyed canvas, craft paper, and fabric, in conjunction with other mediums. Self reveals the idea behind the name of this exhibition, explaining that, "Cotton mouth is when you can't speak with ease, or are coerced into sticking to a script that you didn't write. Cotton mouth is the reality that you're in, because of repeated damage". The choice of title is a burdened one, as a mouth that can no longer function serves as a metaphor for the systemic and continued silencing of Black Americans. Self's work allows the viewer to contemplate the cultural and historical significance of the labor and sacrifice required of Black Americans to produce cotton itself during the 19th century.

=== Skin Tight ===
In her exhibition "Skin Tight" held at the Australian Centre for Contemporary Art (ACCA), Self created a series of contemplative, psychologically charged immersive spaces, incorporating both 2D and 3D works. The collection explores identity through a cultural lens and dissects the act of looking and perception (both as object and subject). The experience of the works invites visitors to reflect on how they both perceive and are perceived by the world around them.

One work that highlights this exchange is "Candy", 2021, which features a female figure lying on a couch with her back towards the viewer as she looks over her shoulder. The shadow of a figure appears to be looking at her body, giving the viewer the sense that they are a voyeur in this interaction, or perhaps are reflected and addressed by the presence of the shadow, that is, the shadow of the viewer themselves. Critic Hugh Magnus wrote of the 2021 work "Dreamers" that it prompted a heightened self-awareness of the way he looked at the figures throughout the show. Unlike traditional white-walled exhibitions, Self's "Skin Tight" transformed ACCA's main gallery into a series of immersive environments, using layered cut-outs, wall drawings, and unexpected sightlines to move visitors through a space that blurred the boundary between art object and installation. The result is an exploration of identity, myth-making, and beauty through new and unexpected ways of looking.

=== Seated ===
Self's sculpture Seated – a painted bronze of a black woman sat on a chair – was unveiled in Coal Drops Yard, London, in 2022. It later moved to the De La Warr Pavilion, Bexhill-on-Sea, where it was vandalised within a week of going on display, the black skin being defaced with white spray paint. Self subsequently organised a "community clean-up day" to restore the artwork, but has spoken of the upset the racist vandalism caused.

=== Lady in Blue ===
In 2024, Self's sculpture Lady in Blue was selected to occupy the Fourth Plinth in London's Trafalgar Square, with the statue, of a female figure striding forward, scheduled to be unveiled on 10 September 2026. The 10-foot tall bronze statue was described by Jonathan Jones in The Guardian as "a carnivalesque masterpiece" but by Cal Revely-Calder in The Telegraph as an "artistic dud" that evoked the Corporate Memphis art style.

=== Art Lovers ===
In 2026, Self's work "Art Lovers" (2026) was featured on the New Museum in New York City. The work is a 13-foot-tall aluminum sculpture of a Black couple embracing with their mouths smiling wide. Gazelle Mba from The New York Times describes the couple in the work as having comically exaggerated limbs–a technique Self commonly uses in her work to give the sense that the figure is straining against the limits of the canvas.

== Art market ==
In 2019, Self's painting Out of Body (2015) sold at auction for $382,000 at Christie's, a record for the artist.

== Notable works in public collections ==
- Chopped Cheese (2017), Pérez Art Museum Miami
- Lite (2018), Institute of Contemporary Art, Boston
- Pant (2018), Philadelphia Museum of Art
- Thank You (2018), Art Institute of Chicago
- Damsel (2019), Museum of Contemporary Art, Los Angeles
- Evening (2019), Museum of Contemporary Art San Diego
- Lady (2019), Pinakothek der Moderne, Munich
- Piss (2019), Brooklyn Museum, New York
- Spat (2019–2020), Whitney Museum, New York
- Nate the Snake (2020), Hessel Museum of Art, Center for Curatorial Studies, Bard College, Annandale-on-Hudson, New York
- Black Face Red Bone with Black Bob (2021), Frye Art Museum, Seattle
- Tabled (2021), Hirshhorn Museum and Sculpture Garden, Smithsonian Institution, Washington, D.C.
- Two Women 3 (2021), Baltimore Museum of Art
