= Lisa Grunwald =

American author (born 1959)

- Born: 1959 (age 66–67)
- Education: Nightingale-Bamford School; Harvard College
- Occupation: Author
- Spouse: Stephen J. Adler
- Children: 2
- Parent(s): Henry A. Grunwald; Beverly Suser
- Relatives: Mandy Grunwald (sister); Peter Grunwald (brother)

Lisa Grunwald Adler (born 1959) is an American author.

== Biography ==
She is the author of seven novels and one children's book. With her husband, former Reuters Editor-in-Chief Stephen J. Adler, she has edited three anthologies: The Marriage Book (Simon & Schuster), Letters of the Century (The Dial Press), and Women's Letters (The Dial Press). Grunwald has been an editor and writer at the magazines Esquire, Avenue, and Life, and has freelanced for others.

Grunwald and Adler have two children, and live in New York City. She is the daughter of the late Beverly Suser and Henry Grunwald, the magazine editor. She grew up in Manhattan, where she graduated from the Nightingale-Bamford School and then from Harvard College. Her sister is Mandy Grunwald, a political consultant, and her brother is Peter Grunwald, a movie producer.

== Books ==
- The Evolution of Annabel Craig, Random House (2024)
- Time After Time, Random House (2019)
- The Marriage Book, Simon & Schuster (2015)
- The Irresistible Henry House, Random House (2010)
- Whatever Makes You Happy, Random House (2005)
- Women's Letters, Dial Press (2005)
- Letters of the Century, America: 1900-1999, Dial Press (1999) (ed., with Stephen J Adler)
- Now, Soon, Later, for children, Morrow (1996)
- New Year's Eve, Crown (1996)
- The Theory of Everything, Knopf (1991)
- Summer, Knopf (1985)
