= The Lords of Strategy =

2010 book by Walter Kiechel III

- Hardcover edition
- Author: Walter Kiechel III
- Language: English
- Subject: Strategy
- Genre: Nonfiction
- Publisher: Harvard Business Press
- Publication date: 2010
- Publication place: United States
- Pages: 368 pp.
- ISBN: 978-1-59139-782-3
- OCLC: 697519782

The Lords of Strategy is a book by Walter Kiechel III, a business journalist, former editorial director of the Harvard Business Review and former managing editor of Fortune magazine, that presents the analysis of strategy evolution since the 1960s. The book was published by Harvard Business Press in March 2010. It was longlisted for the 2010 Financial Times and McKinsey Business Book of the Year Award.

== Overview ==
The book contains chapters devoted to Bruce Henderson, Bill Bain, Frederick Gluck, Michael Porter, the Harvard Business Review, and the influence of each on strategic thinking.

== Reception ==
A reviewer of Financial Times stated, "Providing a window into how to think about strategy today, Kiechel tells their story with novelistic flair. At times inspiring, at times nearly terrifying, this book is a revealing account of how these iconoclasts and the organizations they led revolutionized the way we think about business, changed the very soul of the corporation, and transformed the way we work." Frank Dillon of The Irish Times wrote, "The book is heavy on the detail of the work of the key management consulting firms... Kiechel argues that the influence of the pioneers of strategy has left a lasting legacy for corporations and The Lords of Strategy provides an at times fascinating insight into how the key ideas of strategy took hold."
