= Mandy Grunwald =

American political consultant

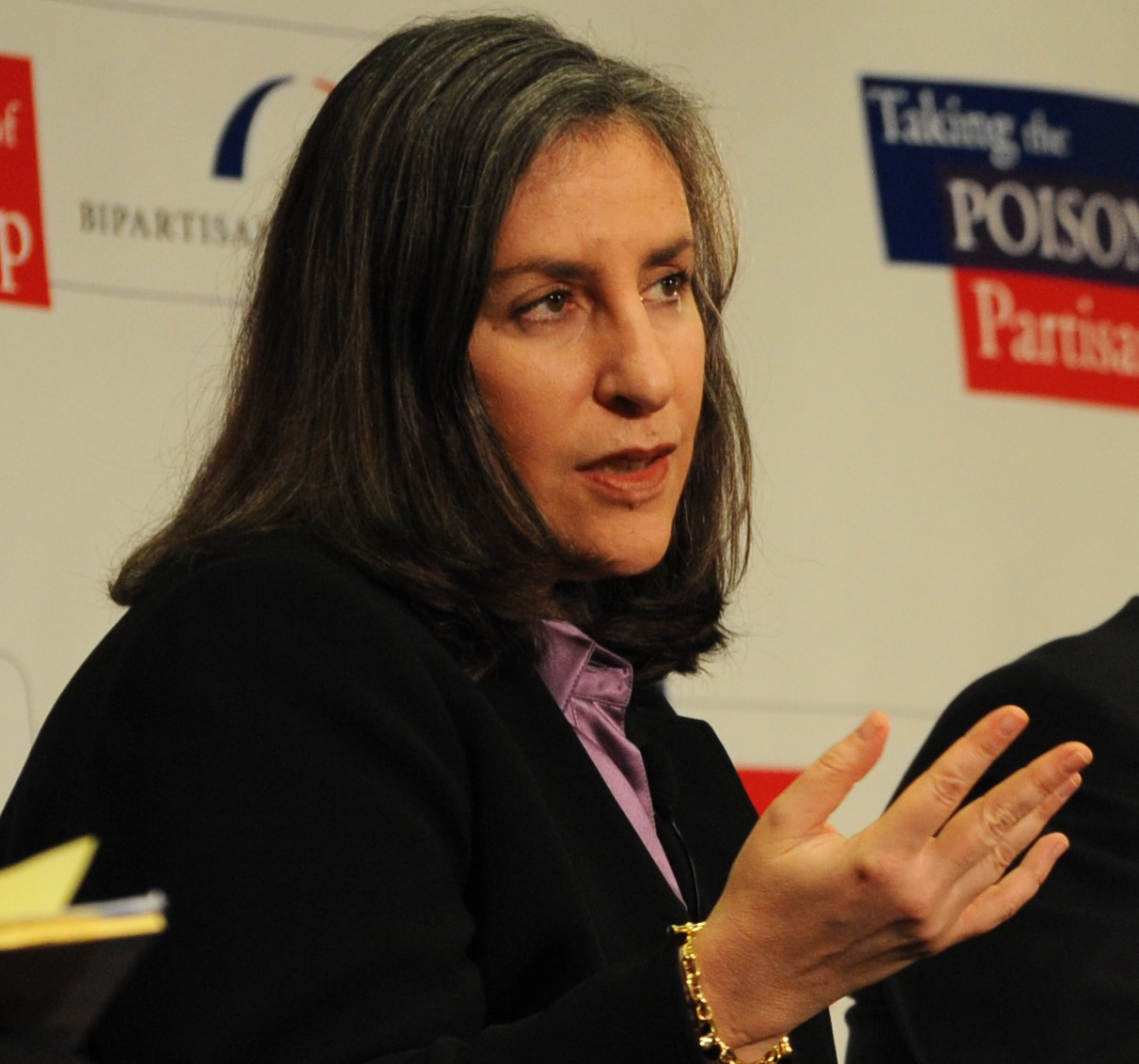
- Grunwald in 2009
- Born: Madeleine Grunwald; October 5, 1957 (age 68); New York, New York, U.S.
- Education: Harvard University (AB)
- Occupations: Political consultant Media advisor
- Political party: Democratic
- Spouse: Matthew Cooper (1997–2007)
- Children: 1

Madeleine Grunwald (born October 5, 1957) is an American professional political consultant and media advisor for the Democratic Party.

== Early life and education ==
Grunwald was born in New York City. She is the daughter of Henry Grunwald, editor-in-chief of Time magazine from 1979 to 1987 and U.S. ambassador to Austria from 1988 to 1990, and Beverly Suser Grunwald, a journalist who was a columnist at Women's Wear Daily. She is the sister of author Lisa Grunwald and movie producer Peter Grunwald. Grunwald's father was born in a non-practicing Jewish family. She grew up on the Upper East Side of Manhattan and on Martha's Vineyard.

Grunwald graduated from the Nightingale-Bamford School in New York City. In 1979, she received a Bachelor of Arts magna cum laude from Harvard University.

== Career ==
Upon graduation she worked at the Sawyer-Miller Group in New York. Gaining prominence through her work on the successful 1992 Bill Clinton presidential campaign, in which she was director of advertising, Grunwald made television appearances defending Bill Clinton, and helped produce The Man From Hope, the biographical film that was the centerpiece of the 1992 Democratic National Convention.

Mandy Grunwald subsequently founded and became president of Grunwald Communications in Washington, D.C. Throughout the 1980s and 1990s, she served as media consultant for three successful Senate campaigns for Daniel Patrick Moynihan (presumably 1982, 1988, and 1994), as well as for the Ruth Messinger's losing effort in the 1997 New York City mayoral election.

In 1999 she served as a broker across the frosty relations between the retiring Moynihan and Hillary Clinton. The latter would later successfully gain the former's seat in the 2000 New York senatorial election. In 2004, Grunwald worked for the senatorial campaign of Ken Salazar in Colorado and gubernatorial effort of John Lynch in New Hampshire, both of whom won. She also worked for Gifford Miller's Democratic primary campaign in New York City's 2005 mayoral race, who ultimately lost.

The Washington Post identified her as one of the key members of "Hillaryland", Hillary Clinton's closest advisors beginning with her First Lady days. Grunwald's position as a White House advisor reportedly faded after 1995, when she and others were supplanted by Dick Morris, according to The New York Times. However, in addition to acting as an important intermediary between the then Senator Daniel Patrick Moynihan and Hillary Clinton for the 2000 New York senatorial election, Grunwald was appointed the head of campaign media relations for the Hillary Clinton 2008 presidential campaign. For her role in Clinton's successful 2006 senate run, Grunwald received more than $930,000.

In 2008, Grunwald worked to elect Jeanne Shaheen and Al Franken to the Senate, the latter of whom ultimately won his race by 312 votes.

In 2010, Grunwald worked for David Cicilline's campaign for U.S. representative of Rhode Island's 1st congressional district, who at the time was the first openly gay mayor of a U.S. state capital. Additionally, Grunwald worked for Richard Blumenthal's successful Senate campaign.

In the 2012 election, Grunwald worked on the successful election campaigns for Senator Elizabeth Warren and Senator Tammy Baldwin, two of the toughest Senate races in the country. Baldwin defeated Tommy Thompson, a four-time governor of Wisconsin, who was favored in the Senate race and Warren defeated Scott Brown, who was the only incumbent senator to lose his seat in the November 2012 election.

In 2016, Grunwald joined Hillary Clinton’s 2016 presidential campaign as a senior communications advisor.

In 2018, Grunwald again worked for Senator Elizabeth Warren and Senator Tammy Baldwin, as well as Senator Amy Klobuchar. She also worked for Molly Kelly’s gubernatorial campaign in New Hampshire and Kevin Lembo’s comptroller campaign in Connecticut.

In 2020, Grunwald helped Senator John Hickenlooper defeat Cory Gardner and worked for Senator Jeanne Shaheen, who was re-elected by her widest margin ever.

The New York Times has described Grunwald as "smart, tough, gruff, intensely loyal to her candidates, with an air of superiority and great certainty." The Times also wrote, "As her sister, Lisa, a novelist, wrote in Glamour magazine four years ago: 'She was older. Braver. Taller. Meaner. Stronger.'" Grunwald is believed to have been the inspiration for the character "Daisy Green" in the roman à clef of the 1992 presidential campaign, Primary Colors, published by "Anonymous" in 1996. Moreover, before Joe Klein was revealed to be the creator, Mandy Grunwald and her novelist sister Lisa Grunwald were among the authorial suspects. In the 1998 film Primary Colors, the character based on her was portrayed by Maura Tierney. She is also partially the inspiration for The West Wing character Mandy Hampton.

During the COVID-19 pandemic in the United States the CDC Director Rochelle Walensky turned to Mandy Grunwald for advice after communication missteps.

== Personal life ==
In 1997, Grunwald married journalist Matthew Cooper. They separated in late 2007. They have a son, born in 1998.
