= Fixing Global Finance =

- Hardcover edition
- Author: Martin Wolf
- Language: English
- Subject: Economics
- Genre: Non-fiction
- Publisher: Johns Hopkins University Press
- Publication date: 2008
- Publication place: United States
- Media type: Print, e-book
- ISBN: 978-0801890482

Fixing Global Finance is a book written by Financial Times columnist Martin Wolf. It discusses the relationship between global imbalances and financial crises, and offers several personal proposals to restore economic balances.

== Content ==
In this book, Wolf argues that the subprime crisis is structurally comparable to the crisis of 1997 in Latin America, 1998 in Russia and 1999 in South-East Asia. This statement is based on the idea that there is a significant relationship between microeconomics of finance and the macroeconomics of the balance of payments. According to Wolf, this resulted in the United States becoming the "borrower and spender of last resort", thereby unbalancing global capital flows. Against this, Wolf proposes that global economic security depends on the ability of emerging economies to develop robust financial systems based on domestic currencies.
