= Walter Kiechel =

Walter Kiechel III (born July 21, 1946, in Tecumseh, Nebraska) is an author and business journalist. He has served as Managing Editor of Fortune magazine and as the editorial director of Harvard Business School Publishing, producer of the Harvard Business Review. His most recent work is The Lords of Strategy, which The Wall Street Journal has described as a "clear, deft and cogent" history of the management consulting industry.

== Biography ==
Born to Walter Kiechel Jr., a prominent Washington, D.C. attorney, and Mary Kiechel, Kiechel III grew up in Alexandria, Virginia before attending Harvard College on a Reserve Officers' Training Corps scholarship. Kiechel was elected to Phi Beta Kappa and graduated cum laude in 1968, when he was commissioned into the United States Navy. There he served in the North Atlantic and Mediterranean Sea aboard the destroyers USS William R. Rush (DD-714) and USS Charles R. Ware (DD-865), eventually attaining the rank of Lieutenant. During his naval service, Kiechel married Eugenia Bethea Dunstan (1946-2008), also of Alexandria, with whom he has a daughter and a son.

Honorably discharged in 1973, Kiechel went on to the J.D./M.B.A. program at Harvard Business School and Harvard Law School, completing his degrees in 1977. From there he joined Time Inc. (now a part of Time Warner), as a Researcher/Writer for Fortune, where his work covered a variety of topics in the managerial sphere. Ascending the ranks at Fortune, he published his first book, Office Hours: A Guide to the Managerial Life, in 1989, which compiles many of the articles the journalist wrote for his regular column of the same name. During this time Kiechel hosted a weekly television series on CNBC, and achieved the top position at the publication in 1994, succeeding Marshall Loeb as Managing Editor. In an unusual move, he was removed from that position less than a year later, and replaced by John Huey, who later became editor-in-chief of all Time Inc. publications. Having left Time Inc., Kiechel was appointed editorial director of Harvard Business School Publishing in 1998, overseeing all editorial content of the Harvard Business Review and all other books and publications of the organization.

Currently, Kiechel continues his career as a freelance writer, authoring articles for such publications as The Washington Post and others. He has one younger sister, Victoria Kiechel, an architect, and one younger brother, Conrad Kiechel, also a journalist. Walter Kiechel makes his home in Hoboken, New Jersey.
