= Stephen J. Adler =

American journalist (born 1955)

- Born: 1955 (age 70–71); New York City, U.S.
- Education: Harvard University (AB, JD)
- Occupation: Journalist
- Known for: Editor-in-Chief of Reuters (2011 to 2021)

Stephen J. Adler (born 1955) is an American journalist. He was editor-in-chief of Reuters from 2011 to 2021.

== Early life ==
Stephen Adler was born in 1955. His father, Norman, was a high school English department chairman, and his mother, Mildred, was a writer and social worker. He graduated from Harvard University in 1977 and from Harvard Law School in 1983.

== Career ==
He began his career as a reporter for Tampa Times and Tallahassee Democrat. He joined The American Lawyer in 1983, then in 1988 joined The Wall Street Journal as legal editor. He was promoted to assistant managing editor in 1998 and to deputy managing editor in 2000.

He was editor-in-chief of BusinessWeek from 2005 to 2009. During his five-year tenure, the magazine and its website won more than 100 awards.

He joined Thomson Reuters in 2010 as senior vice president and editorial director of the company's Professional Division. In 2011, he was named editor-in-chief of Reuters News, where he directed the editorial operations and news strategy for the company. During his tenure, Reuters won eight Pulitzer Prizes. In 2018, he spoke out against the arrest and conviction of two Reuters journalists in Myanmar. He retired from Reuters in 2021.

In 2021, he founded the NYU Ethics and Journalism Initiative, which he directs and which provides ethics training in local newsroom; runs the site ethicsandjournalism.org; and hosts the Collier Awards for Ethics in Journalism.

Adler is chairman of the board of Reporters Committee for Freedom of the Press and is a member of the advisory board of the Clooney Foundation for Justice and the board of the Wilmers Integrity Prize. He is a member of the Ethics Committee of the Society of Professional Journalists.

Adler is author of the book The Jury: Trial and Error in the American Courtroom, which won the Silver Gavel Award from the American Bar Association. With his wife, novelist Lisa Grunwald, he was co-editor of Letters of the Century: America 1900—1999, Women's Letters: America from the Revolutionary War to the Present, and The Marriage Book.

== Awards ==
- 2023: Gerald Loeb Lifetime Achievement Award
