= James Grant (finance) =

American writer and publisher

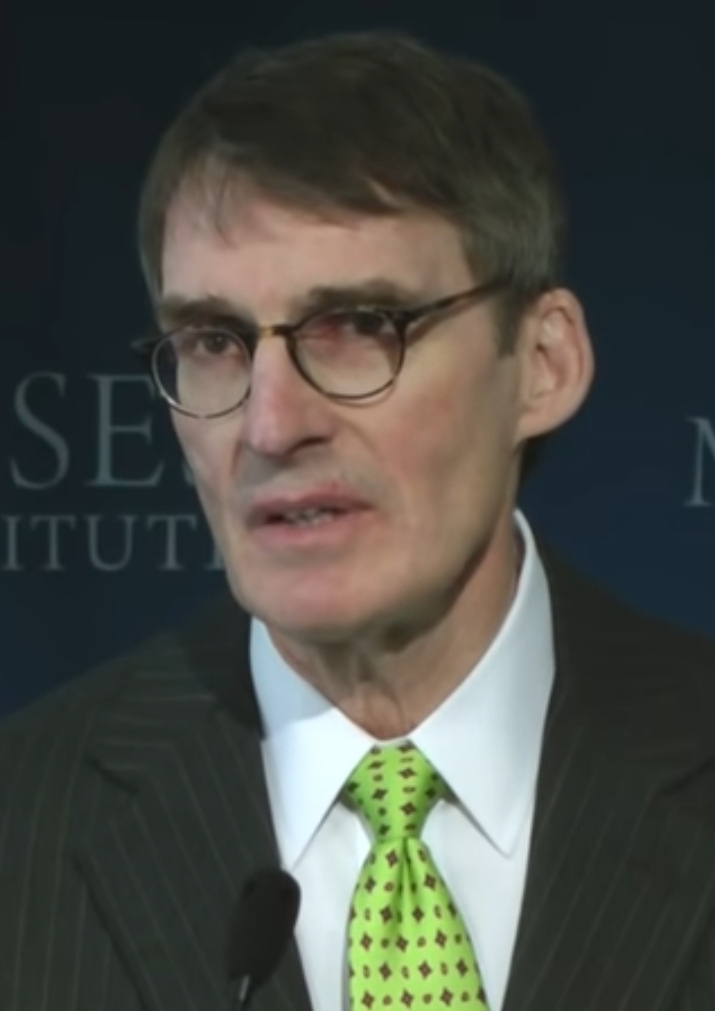
- Grant in 2014
- Born: July 26, 1946 (age 80); New York, New York
- Education: Indiana University (BA); Columbia University (MIA)
- Occupations: Writer, publisher
- Spouse: Patricia Kavanagh

James "Jim" Grant (born 26 July 1946) is an American writer and publisher. He founded Grant's Interest Rate Observer, a twice-monthly journal of the financial markets published since 1983. He has also written several books on finance and history.

== Personal life ==
Grant served as a Navy Gunner's mate, graduated from Indiana University, and received a master's degree in International relations from Columbia University.

He is married to Patricia Kavanagh, M.D., a neurologist, and lives in Brooklyn Heights, Brooklyn. They have four children.

== Journalism ==
He founded Grant's in 1983.

In the 2000s, after the collapse of the dot com bubble and the 2007–2008 crisis originating in US mortgage-backed securities, ubscription rates increased sharply for Grant's Interest Rate Observer, and Grant declined several offers to buy the publication. Mr. Market Miscalculates (2008), a collection of Grant's articles published over the preceding 10 years, elicited an appreciative review in the Financial Times. John Authers wrote of the staff of the FT: "If Grant could see what was happening this clearly ... and warn of it in a well-circulated publication, how did the world's financial regulators fail to avert the crisis before it became deadly, and how did the rest of us continue to make the irrational investing decisions that make Mr. Market behave the way he does?"

Grant received the 2015 Gerald Loeb Lifetime Achievement Award for excellence in business journalism.

In October 2017, Grant's Interest Rate Observer published an article by Grant and Evan Lorenz sharply critical of Bridgewater Associates, the hedge fund created by Ray Dalio. The article claimed Bridgewater engaged in questionable practices such as potential conflicts of interests in lending money to auditing firm KPMG and having 91 former Bridgewater employees working at Bank of New York Mellon, the custodial bank for Bridgewater. The article became "the talk of Wall Street", and Bridgewater denied any impropriety. A week after publication, Grant issued an apology in print and live on CNBC, retracting parts of the story and stating: “Bridgewater is a secretive and eccentric firm and I let my suspicions of that get in the way of our ordinarily comprehensive due diligence.”

Grant was described in 2019 as a "cult hero" with frequently contrarian views and mixed record of predictions, leading journalist Michelle Celarier to write: "Although his views may be wrong-headed at times, Grant's wry, often self-deprecating humor goes a long way toward disarming the critics."

== 2012 election ==
During Representative Ron Paul's 2012 U.S. presidential campaign, he named Grant as his likely candidate for Chairman of the Federal Reserve to replace Ben Bernanke whose term expired in 2014.

== Bibliography ==
- 1983: Bernard M. Baruch: The Adventures of a Wall Street Legend,
- 1993: Minding Mr. Market, 2000 paperback edition
- 1996: The Trouble with Prosperity: A Contrarian's Tale of Boom, Bust, and Speculation
- 2005: John Adams: Party of One, paperback edition
- 2008: Mr. Market Miscalculates: The Bubble Years and Beyond
- 2011: Mr. Speaker!: The Life and Times of Thomas B. Reed, the Man Who Broke the Filibuster, 2012 paperback edition
- 2014: The Forgotten Depression
- 2019: Bagehot: The Life and Times of the Greatest Victorian

== See also ==
- Everything bubble
