= Marshall Loeb =

American writer (1929 – 2017)

- Born: Marshall Robert Loeb; May 30, 1929; Chicago, Illinois, U.S.
- Died: December 9, 2017 (aged 88); Manhattan, New York, U.S.
- Education: University of Missouri
- Occupation: Business journalist
- Spouse: Irmingard "Peggy" Loewe (m. 1954; died 2010)
- Children: 2
- Awards: Gerald Loeb Award; 1975; 1996

Marshall Robert Loeb (May 30, 1929 – December 9, 2017) was an American author, editor, commentator and columnist specializing in business matters, who spent 38 years in the Time Inc. publication network which included service as managing editor of both Fortune and Money magazines. The New York Times called him "one of the most visible and influential editors in the magazine industry".

== Biography ==
Loeb grew up on the West Side of Chicago. He was awarded a degree in journalism from the University of Missouri. After graduating, he was employed as a foreign correspondent in Germany and was hired as a reporter by St. Louis Globe-Democrat. He took a position with Time where he worked from 1956 to 1980, writing and editing more than 130 cover articles during his time with the magazine. He was named managing editor of Money magazine, serving in that position from 1980 to 1986, and filled the same role at Fortune from 1986 to 1994.

During his tenure at Fortune, Loeb was credited with expanding the traditional focus on business and the economy with added graphs, charts and tables, as well as the addition of articles on topics such as executive life, and social issues connected to the world of business, such as the effectiveness of public schools and on homelessness. Loeb stepped down as managing editor of Fortune in May 1994 upon hitting Time Inc.'s mandatory retirement age of 65 after 38 years working for the company's network of magazines, to be replaced by Walter Kiechel III, an executive editor at the publication.

His commentaries were syndicated in the Your Money column in publications nationwide and his Your Dollars was broadcast on the CBS Radio Network. He was a former president of the American Society of Magazine Editors. The Columbia Journalism Review appointed him to serve as the publication's editor in December 1996, succeeding Suzanne Braun Levine.

Plunging into Politics, a 1964 book coauthored with Conservative author William Safire provides a guide on getting into politics for interested amateurs, recommending that the best way to get involved is to start at the bottom by volunteering and working on political campaigns starting at the precinct level. The book emphasizes that being rich or a lawyer may help, but that both major parties in the U.S. need people who are willing, able and resourceful. His book Marshall Loeb's Lifetime Financial Strategies was published in January 1996 by Little, Brown and Company.

After Maryland Public Television dropped Louis Rukeyser in March 2002 as host of the Wall $treet Week program he had created 32 years earlier, Loeb and retired economics correspondent for CBS News Ray Brady were tapped to fill the hosting responsibilities during a three-month period while the program format was revamped.

Loeb died of Parkinson's disease in Manhattan, at the age of 88. He was survived by his two children, Michael (1955) and Margret (1956) and six grandchildren. His wife, Peggy, died on October 26, 2010. His son Michael is the co-founder of Synapse Group, a magazine distribution company.

== Bibliography ==
- Loeb, Marshall; Safire, William (1964). Plunging Into Politics. McKay. ASIN B000OM8IM6.
- Loeb, Marshall (1996). Marshall Loeb's Lifetime Financial Strategies. Little, Brown and Company. ISBN 978-0-316-53075-0.

== Awards ==
- 1975 Gerald Loeb Award for Magazines for "Faisal and Oil," Time
- 1996 Gerald Loeb Lifetime Achievement Award
