= Bloomberg Businessweek =

American weekly business magazine

- Cover of the issue from February 15, 2021
- Editor: Brad Stone
- Categories: Business
- Frequency: monthly
- Total circulation: 325,000 (2018)
- First issue: September 1929; 96 years ago
- Company: Bloomberg L.P.
- Country: United States
- Based in: New York City; Bloomberg Tower, 731 Lexington Avenue, Manhattan, New York City 10022, United States (business magazine); Citigroup Center, 153 East 53rd Street between Lexington and Third Avenue, Manhattan, New York City 10022 (market magazine)
- Language: English
- Website: bloomberg.com/businessweek
- ISSN: 0007-7135

Bloomberg Businessweek, previously known as BusinessWeek (and before that Business Week and The Business Week), is an American monthly business magazine published 12 times a year. The magazine debuted in New York City in September 1929.

Since 2009, the magazine has been owned by Bloomberg L.P. and became a monthly in June 2024.

== History ==
=== 1929–2008: Businessweek ===
The Business Week was first published based in New York City in September 1929, weeks before the stock market crash. The magazine provided information and opinions on what was happening in the business world at the time. Early sections of the magazine included marketing, labor, finance, management and Washington Outlook, which made it one of the first publications to cover national political issues that directly impacted the business world. The name of the magazine was shortened to Business Week in 1934.

Originally published as a resource for business managers, the magazine shifted its strategy in the 1970s and added consumers outside the business world. By 1975, the magazine was carrying more advertising pages annually than any other magazine in the United States.

Stephen B. Shepard served as editor-in-chief from 1984 until 2005, when he was chosen to be the founding dean of the CUNY Graduate School of Journalism. Under Shepard, Businessweek's readership grew to more than six million in the late 1980s. He was succeeded by Stephen J. Adler of The Wall Street Journal.

Businessweek began publishing its annual rankings of United States business school MBA programs in 1988. In 2006, Businessweek started publishing annual rankings of undergraduate business programs in addition to its MBA program listing.

=== 2009–present: Bloomberg Businessweek ===
Businessweek experienced a decline in circulation during the late-2000s recession as advertising revenues fell one-third by the start of 2009 and the magazine's circulation fell to 936,000. In July 2009, it was reported that McGraw-Hill was trying to sell Businessweek and had hired Evercore Partners to conduct the sale. Because of the magazine's liabilities, it was suggested that it might change hands for the nominal price of $1 to an investor who was willing to incur losses turning the magazine around.

In late 2009, Bloomberg L.P. bought the magazine—reportedly for between $2 million to $5 million plus assumption of liabilities—and renamed it Bloomberg BusinessWeek. News reports published in 2019 suggest McGraw-Hill received the high end of the speculated price, at $5 million, along with the assumption of debt.

In early 2010, the magazine title was restyled as Bloomberg Businessweek (with a lowercase "w") as part of a redesign. During the following years, the bold, eclectic, playful, and memetic face of Businessweek was cultivated largely by Businessweek's creative director Richard Turley, then Rob Vargas (from 2014), and Deputy Creative director Tracy Ma (from 2011 through 2016). During her time at Businessweek, Ma worked on over 200 issues.

As of 2014, the magazine was losing $30 million per year, about half of the $60 million it was reported losing in 2009. Adler resigned as editor-in-chief and was replaced by Josh Tyrangiel, who had been deputy managing editor of Time magazine. In 2016, Bloomberg announced changes to Businessweek, which was losing between $20 and $30 million. Nearly 30 Bloomberg News journalists were let go across the U.S., Europe, and Asia, and it was announced that a new version of Bloomberg Businessweek would launch the following year. In addition, editor-in-chief Ellen Pollock stepped down from her position, and Washington Bureau Chief Megan Murphy was named editor-in-chief. Megan Murphy served as editor from November 2016; until she stepped down from the role in January 2018, and Joel Weber was appointed by the editorial board in her place.

Brad Stone was appointed editor of the magazine in January 2024, when the magazine switched to publishing biweekly. In June of the same year, the magazine became a monthly.

== Controversy ==
=== "The Big Hack" ===
On October 4, 2018, Bloomberg Businessweek published "The Big Hack: How China Used a Tiny Chip to Infiltrate U.S. Companies," an article by Jordan Robertson and Michael Riley that claimed that China had hacked dozens of technology corporations, including Amazon and Apple, by placing an extra integrated circuit on a Supermicro server motherboard during manufacturing.

Pingwest, a media company founded in Silicon Valley and based in Beijing, identified the chip mentioned in the article as a balun. The company pointed out that its size made it impossible to implement any form of attack; it did not have the storage space required to store commands that would allow a hacker to infiltrate the hardware. They suggested that Businessweek had underestimated security standards employed by Amazon and Apple.

Bloomberg's claims have faced significant scrutiny. By 2 p.m. on the day of publication, Apple, Amazon, and Supermicro issued blanket denials, which Bloomberg reported. Within the week, the United States Department of Homeland Security stated that it saw no reason to question those refutations. The National Security Agency, as well as the Government Communications Headquarters and National Cyber Security Centre of the United Kingdom, also denied the article's claims.

Five days later, Bloomberg published a related article about a major US telecommunications company who would have used the same Supermicro server motherboard.

In 2021, Bloomberg published a follow-up article that stood by its allegations.

== Additional versions ==
International editions of Businessweek were available on newsstands in Europe and Asia until 2005, when publication of regional editions was suspended to help increase foreign readership of customized European and Asian versions of Businessweek's website. That same year, however, the Russian edition was launched in collaboration with Rodionov Publishing House.

At the same time, Businessweek partnered with InfoPro Management, a publishing and market research company based in Beirut, Lebanon, to produce the Arabic version of the magazine in 22 Arab countries.

In 2011, Bloomberg Businessweek continued its international expansion and announced plans to introduce a Polish-language edition called Bloomberg Businessweek Polska, as well as a Chinese edition, which was relaunched in November 2011.

Also in 2011, Bloomberg Businessweek launched an iPad version of the magazine using Apple's subscription billing service. The iPad edition was the first to use this subscription method, which allows one to subscribe via an iTunes account. There are over 100,000 subscribers to the iPad edition of Businessweek.

== Honors and awards ==
In 2011, Adweek named Bloomberg Businessweek as the top business magazine in the U.S. In 2012, Bloomberg Businessweek won the general excellence award for general-interest magazines at the National Magazine Awards. Also in 2012, Bloomberg Businessweek editor Josh Tyrangiel was named magazine editor of the year by Ad Age. In 2014, Bloomberg Businessweek won a Society of American Business Editors and Writers Best in Business award for magazines, general excellence.

In 2016, the Online Journalism Awards highlighted Bloomberg Businessweek's explanatory reporting work on "What Is Code?"

== Employees ==
Notable present and former employees of the magazine include:

- Stephen B. Shepard, former editor-in-chief of BusinessWeek (1984–2005) and founding dean of the CUNY Graduate School of Journalism
- Elliott V. Bell, former publisher and editor-in-chief of BusinessWeek and Superintendent of Banks for the State of New York, advisor to Thomas E. Dewey
- Robert Kolker, former investigative journalist and author of Hidden Valley Road
- Brad Stone, former investigative journalist and author of books on tech companies
- Josh Tyrangiel, former editor and deputy managing editor of Time magazine
- Malcolm Muir, founder of the magazine, president of McGraw-Hill Publishing (1928–1937)
- Virgil Jordan, former editor and past president of The Conference Board
- Judith H. Dobrzynski, former senior editor
- Stephen J. Adler, former editor-in-chief of BusinessWeek (2005–2009), editor-in-chief of Reuters (2011–2021)
- Carla Robbins, former reporter and deputy editorial page editor of The New York Times (2007–2012)

== See also ==
- Bloomberg Markets
- Bloomberg News
