= Fortune (magazine) =

American business magazine

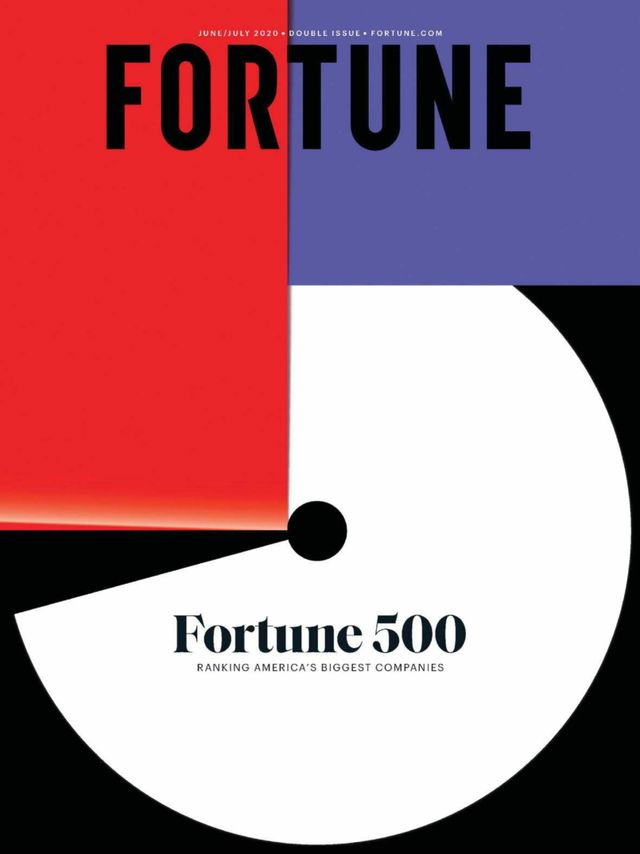
- Cover of the issue dated June–July 2020
- Editor: Alyson Shontell
- Categories: Business magazines
- Frequency: 12 issues/year (1929–1978); 24 issues/year (1978–2009); 18 issues/year (2009–2014); 16 issues/year (2014–2017); 12 issues/year (2018–2019); 10 issues/year (2020); 6 issues/year (2021–present)
- Publisher: Fortune Media Group Holdings (Chatchaval Jiaravanon)
- Total circulation: 852,202 (2018)
- Founder: Henry Luce
- Founded: 1929; 97 years ago
- First issue: September 1, 1929; 97 years ago
- Country: United States
- Based in: New York City, U.S.
- Language: English
- Website: fortune.com
- ISSN: 0015-8259 (print); 2169-155X (web)
- OCLC: 38999231

Fortune (stylized in all caps) is an American global business magazine headquartered in New York City. It is published by Fortune Media Group Holdings, a global business media company. The publication was founded by Henry Luce in 1929. The magazine competes with Forbes and Bloomberg Businessweek in the national business magazine category and distinguishes itself with long, in-depth feature articles.

The magazine regularly publishes ranked lists, including ranking companies by revenue, such as in the Fortune 500 that it has published annually since 1955 and in the Fortune Global 500. The magazine is also known for its annual Fortune Investor's Guide.

== History ==
Fortune was founded by Time magazine co-founder Henry Luce in 1929, who declared it as "the Ideal Super-Class Magazine", a "distinguished and de luxe" publication "vividly portraying, interpreting and recording the Industrial Civilization." Briton Hadden, Luce's business partner, was not enthusiastic about the idea—which Luce intended to title Power—but Luce went forward with it after Hadden's sudden death on February 27, 1929.

In late October 1929, the Wall Street crash of 1929 occurred, marking the onset of the Great Depression. In a memo to the Time Inc. board in November 1929, Luce wrote, "We will not be over-optimistic. We will recognize that this business slump may last as long as an entire year." The publication made its official debut in February 1930. Its editor was Luce, managing editor Parker Lloyd-Smith, and art director Thomas Maitland Cleland. Single copies of the first issue cost $1 (equivalent to $19 in 2025). An urban legend says that Cleland mocked up the cover of the first issue with the $1 price because no one had yet decided how much to charge; the magazine was printed before anyone realized it, and when people saw it for sale, they thought the magazine must really have worthwhile content. There were 30,000 subscribers who had already signed up to receive that initial 184-page issue. By 1937, the number of subscribers had grown to 460,000, and the magazine had turned half a million dollars in annual profit.

At a time when business publications were little more than numbers and statistics printed in black and white, Fortune was an oversized 11" × 14", using creamy heavy paper, full color throughout, and a high-quality cover printed by a special process. Leading graphic designers Leo Lionni and Will Burtin were among Fortune art directors in 1950s and 60s. Fortune was also noted for its color photography, featuring the work of Margaret Bourke-White, Ansel Adams, and others. Walker Evans served as its photography editor from 1945 to 1965.

During the Great Depression, the magazine developed a reputation for its social conscience and for a team of writers, including James Agee, Archibald MacLeish, John Kenneth Galbraith, and Alfred Kazin, hired specifically for their writing abilities. The magazine became an important leg of Luce's media empire; after the successful launch of Time in 1923 and Fortune in 1930, Luce went on to launch Life in 1936 and Sports Illustrated in 1954.

From its launch in 1930 to 1978, Fortune was published monthly. In January 1978, it began publishing biweekly. In October 2009, citing declining advertising revenue and circulation, Fortune began publishing every three weeks. As of 2018, Fortune was published 14 times a year. Currently it is published six times per year.

Marshall Loeb was named managing editor in 1986. During his tenure at Fortune, Loeb expanded its traditional focus on business and the economy with added graphs, charts, and tables, as well as the addition of articles on topics such as executive life and social issues connected to the world of business, including the effectiveness of public schools and on homelessness. The magazine's November 10th, 1986 cover story featured a picture of Anthony “Fat Tony” Salerno with the headline, 'The 50 Biggest Mafia Bosses.'

During the years when Time Warner owned Time Inc., between 1990 and 2014, Fortune articles (as well as those from Money magazine) were hosted at CNNMoney.com. In June 2014, after Time Inc. spun off from its corporate parent, Fortune launched its own website at Fortune.com.

On November 26, 2017, it was announced that Meredith Corporation would acquire Time Inc. in a $2.8 billion deal. The acquisition was completed on January 31, 2018.

On November 9, 2018, it was announced that Meredith Corporation was selling Fortune to Thai billionaire Chatchaval Jiaravanon for $150 million. A member of Thailand's wealthiest family, Jiaravanon is affiliated with the Thailand-based conglomerate Charoen Pokphand Group, which has holdings in agriculture, telecommunications, retail, pharmaceuticals, and finance.

Since March 2020, access to Fortune.com has been restricted by a paywall. In July 2025, Fortune laid off 10 percent of its staffers. At the time, the magazine had 360 full-time employees.

=== Fortune Indonesia ===
Fortune Indonesia is an American global business magazine headquartered in New York City and published for the Indonesian region. It is published by Fortune Media Group Holdings, a global business media company. FORTUNE Indonesia is available in print version every month as well as an online news portal. Currently, Fortune Indonesia is led by Editor-in-Chief Hendra Soeprajitno.

== Lists ==
Fortune regularly publishes ranked lists. In the human resources field, for example, it publishes a list of the Best Companies to Work For. Lists include companies ranked in order of gross revenue and business profile, as well as business leaders:

- Fortune 500
- Fortune 1000
- Fortune Global 500
- Fortune India 500
- Fortune China 500
- Fortune Southeast Asia 500
- 40 Under 40
- Fortune Most Powerful Women Entrepreneurs
- 100 Best Companies to Work For
- World's Most Admired Companies
- 100 Fastest Growing Companies
- The Unicorn List
- Businessperson of the Year
- Change the World
- The World's 50 Greatest Leaders
- The Ledger 40 Under 40
- Future 50
- 100 Best Workplaces For Millennials
- 100 Best Workplaces For Women
- 50 Best Workplaces for New College Graduates
- Best Workplaces for Diversity
- 50 Best Places to Live for Families
- Crypto 40

== Editors ==
There have been 20 top editors since Fortune was conceived in 1929. Following the elimination of the editor-in-chief role at Time Inc. in October 2013, the top editor's title was changed from "managing editor" to "editor" in 2014. The present title is "editor-in-chief".

- Parker Lloyd-Smith (1929–1931)
- Ralph Ingersoll (1932–1935)
- Eric Hodgins (1935–1937)
- Russell Davenport (1937–1940)
- Richardson Wood (1940–1941)
- Ralph D. "Del" Paine, Jr. (1941–1953)
- Hedley Donovan (1953–1959)
- Duncan Norton-Taylor (1959–1965)
- Louis Banks (1965–1970)
- Robert Lubar (1970–1980)
- William S. Rukeyser (1980–1986)
- Marshall Loeb (1986–1994)
- Walter Kiechel III (1994–1995)
- John Huey (1995–2001)
- Richard "Rik" Kirkland (2001–2005)
- Eric Pooley (2005–2006)
- Andrew "Andy" Serwer (2006–2014)
- Alan Murray (2014–2017)
- Clifton Leaf (2017–2021)
- Alyson Shontell (2021-present)

== See also ==
- Fortune Battle of the Corporate Bands, an annual music competition for amateur company-sponsored bands
- List of United States magazines
