= List of members of the United States Marine Corps =

The following is a list of people who served in the United States Marine Corps and have gained fame through previous or subsequent endeavors, infamy, or successes. Marines who became notable in the United States Marine Corps and are part of the Marine Corps history and lore are listed and posted in the list of historically notable United States Marines.

== A ==
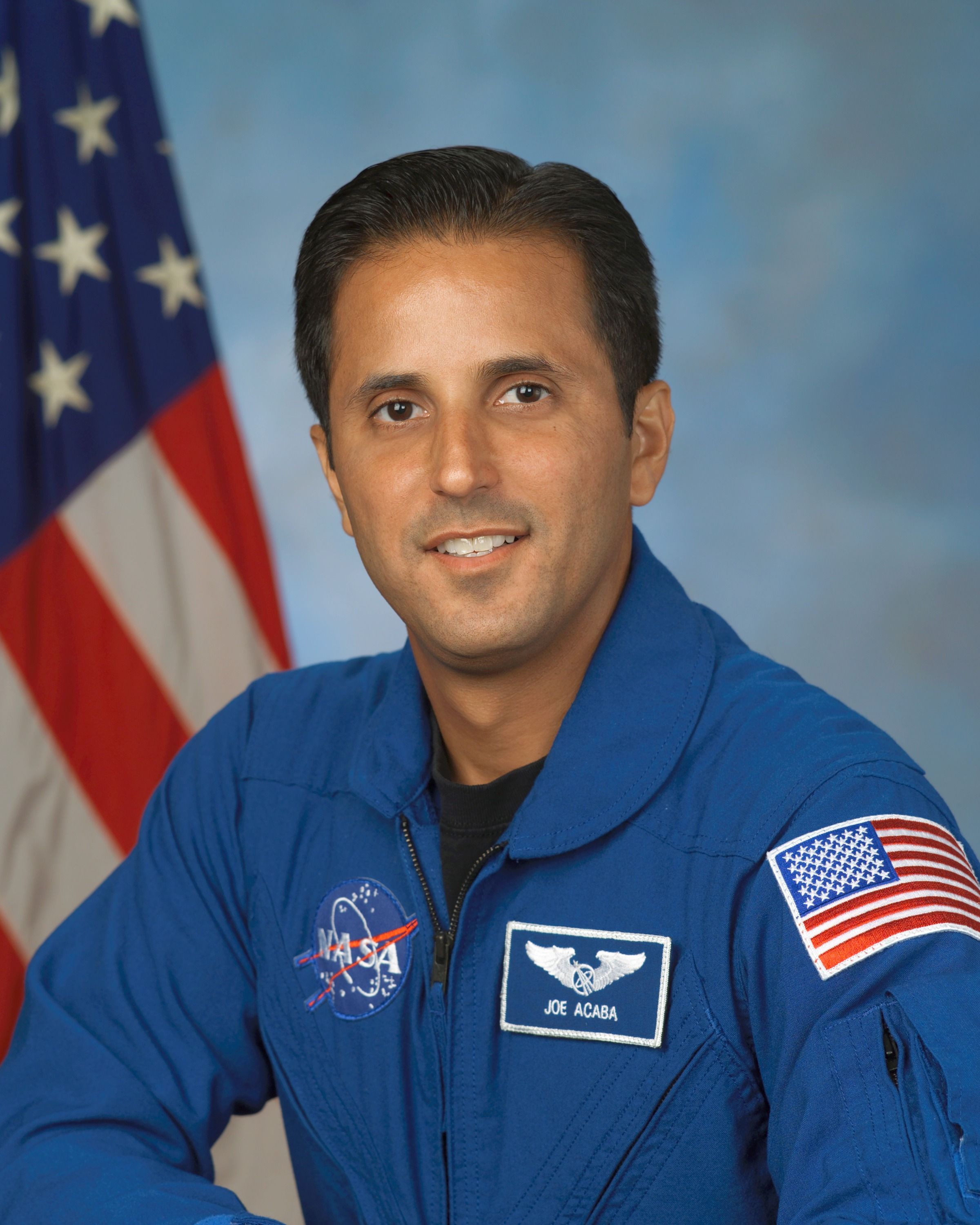
Joseph M. Acaba

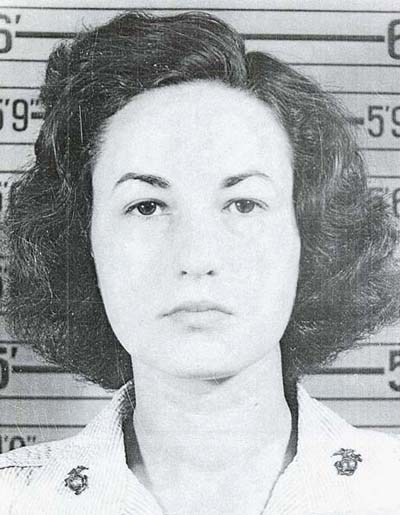
Bea Arthur 1943 USMC identity photo.

- Joseph M. Acaba – NASA astronaut
- Don Adams – Emmy Award-winning actor (Get Smart)
- Eddie Adams – Pulitzer Prize-winning photographer
- James H. Adams III – Marine Corps lieutenant general serving as the deputy commandant for programs and resources of the U.S. Marine Corps. Previously served as the deputy director for requirements and capability development of the Joint Staff.
- Sandy Alderson – General Manager of the New York Mets
- Andrew M. Allen – NASA astronaut
- Nicholas Andersen – Former Presidential Appointee and Acting Assistant Secretary of Energy for Cybersecurity, Energy Security, and Emergency Response
- Art Anderson – NFL football player
- Mike Anderson – NFL football player
- Terry Anderson – journalist for the Associated Press who was taken hostage by Shia Hezbollah militants of the Islamic Jihad Organization in Lebanon and was held for six years
- Walter Anderson – author; Parade editor; Parade Publications CEO; GED spokesperson
- Afa Anoaʻi – Samoan-American professional wrestler and manager best known for performing with his brother Sika as The Wild Samoans
- Paul Arizin – NBA basketball player
- Bea Arthur – Emmy and Tony Award-winning and Golden Globe-nominated actor (Maude, The Golden Girls); she denied her service in the USMC in later life

== B ==
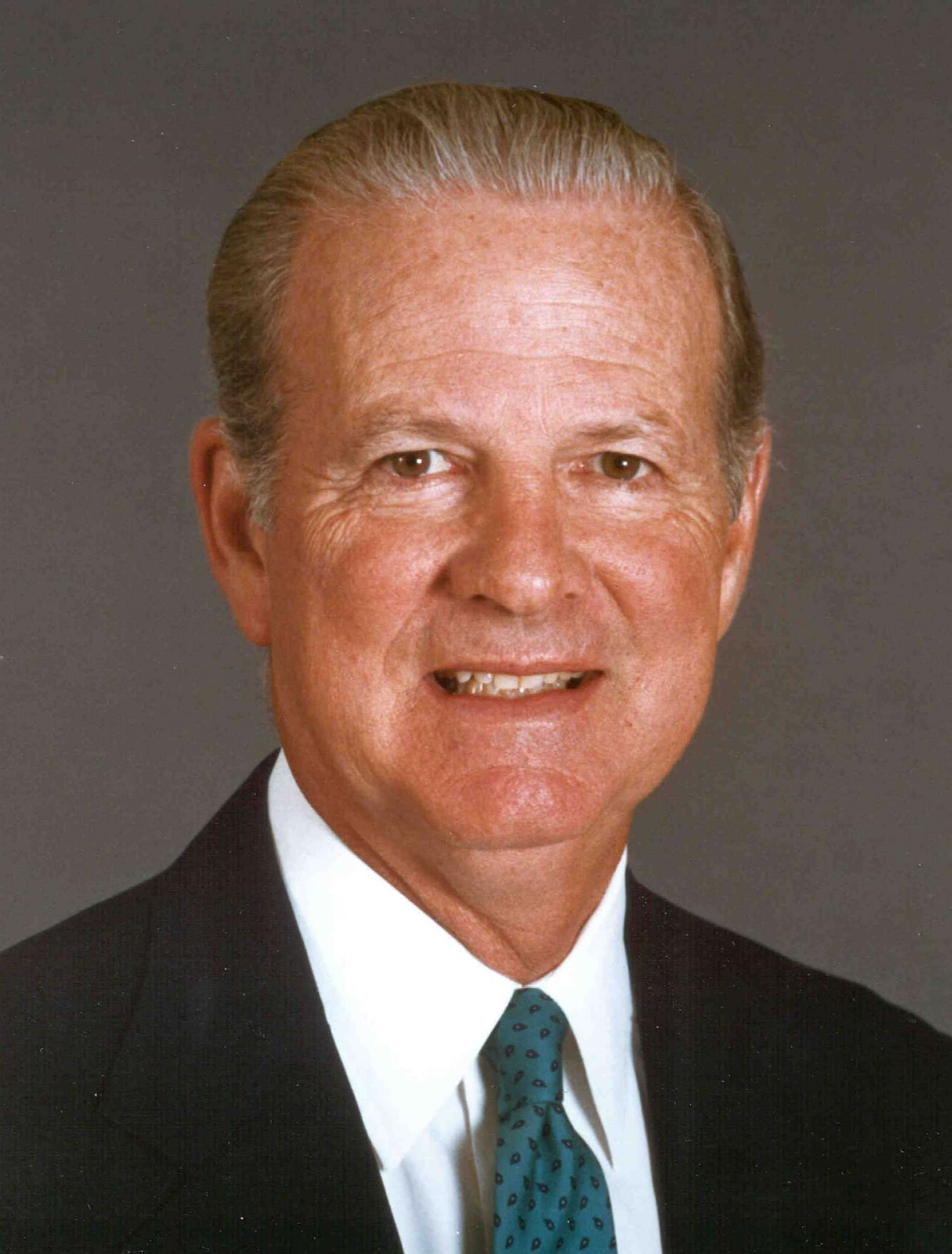
James Baker

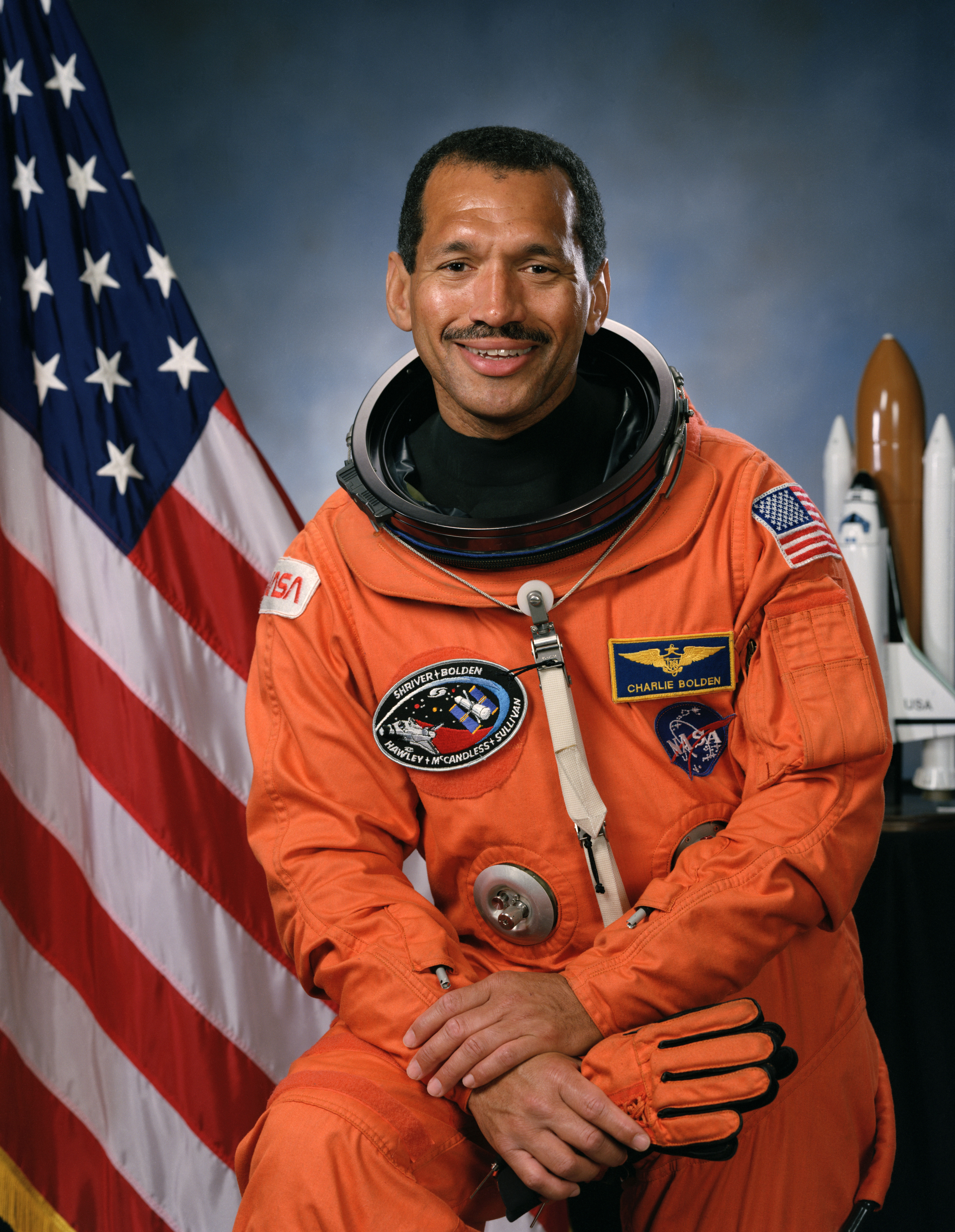
Charles Bolden

- F. Lee Bailey – lawyer, notable for his involvement in cases relating to the My Lai Massacre and the O.J. Simpson trial
- Dusty Baker – Major League Baseball manager for the San Francisco Giants
- James Baker – former U.S. Secretary of State, elder statesman, advisor and friend of the Bush family
- Leslie M. "Bud" Baker, Jr. – chairman of the Board of Wachovia Bank
- Greg Ballard – Mayor of Indianapolis
- Dan Bankhead – first African American pitcher in Major League Baseball who played in the Negro leagues for the Birmingham Black Barons and the Memphis Red Sox and later for the Brooklyn Dodgers
- Nick Barone – boxer (1950s), the "Fighting Marine"
- Thomas D. Barr – attorney with Cravath, Swaine & Moore, "father of modern big-case litigation"
- James Lee Barrett – Tony Award-winning writer (Shenandoah)
- Carmen Basilio – world champion boxer, Boxing Hall of Famer
- Hank Bauer – professional baseball player
- Paul Baxley – actor and stunt coordinator best known for his work as a stunt coordinator on Star Trek: The Original Series and as William Shatner's stunt double
- Jim Beaver – actor, writer, star of Deadwood and Supernatural
- John Beckett – college football star and coach
- Bob Bell – Bozo the Clown (TV)
- Glen Bell – founder of Taco Bell fast food chain
- Terrel Bell – U.S. Secretary of Education (1981–1984) during the Reagan administration
- Donald P. Bellisario – television producer and screenwriter of Magnum, P.I., JAG, and NCIS
- Henry Bellmon – Governor of Oklahoma, U.S. Senator (OK-R)
- Peter Benchley – Golden Globe and BAFTA Award-nominated author, screenwriter and ocean activist (Jaws, The Deep)
- Paul Benedict – actor (Cold Turkey, Jeremiah Johnson)
- John Besh – chef and restaurant owner
- Patty Berg – LPGA golfer
- Rod Bernard – swamp pop musician
- Larry Blyden – Tony Award-winning actor and game show host (What's My Line?, On a Clear Day You Can See Forever)
- John Wayne Bobbitt – husband who gained international fame in 1993 when his then-wife Lorena severed John's penis with a knife while he was asleep in bed
- Charles F. Bolden, Jr. – NASA shuttle pilot and administrator
- Robert Bork – retired federal judge, law professor and Supreme court nominee
- Blackbear Bosin – artist
- Harold Bradley Jr. – football player, International artist, actor and musician
- Vance D. Brand – Astronaut who also served in the U.S. Air Force (Apollo–Soyuz Test Project, STS-5, STS-41-B, STS-35)
- Hugh Brannum – "Mr. Green Jeans" on Captain Kangaroo
- Donald Bren – CEO, The Irvine Company
- Randolph Bresnik – NASA astronaut, Space Shuttle Crew STS-129, and ISS Flight Engineer/Commander 52/53
- Daniel B. Brewster – U.S. Senator from Maryland
- Wilford Brimley – Award-winning-actor (The Thing, Cocoon, The Natural, The China Syndrome, Tender Mercies)
- Richard Brooks – Academy Award-winning filmmaker and novelist (In Cold Blood, Blackboard Jungle, Crossfire, Cat on a Hot Tin Roof, Elmer Gantry)
- Art Buchwald – humor columnist
- Dale Bumpers – Governor of Arkansas, U.S. Senator from Arkansas
- Jack Burke Jr. – professional golfer who won the 1956 Masters Tournament and the 1956 PGA Championship
- Lem Burnham – American football player
- Romus R.V. Burgin – Author of Islands of the Damned: A Marine at War in the Pacific who was portrayed in the HBO miniseries The Pacific (2010)
- Bob Burns – comedian
- Conrad Burns – U.S. Senator from Montana

== C ==
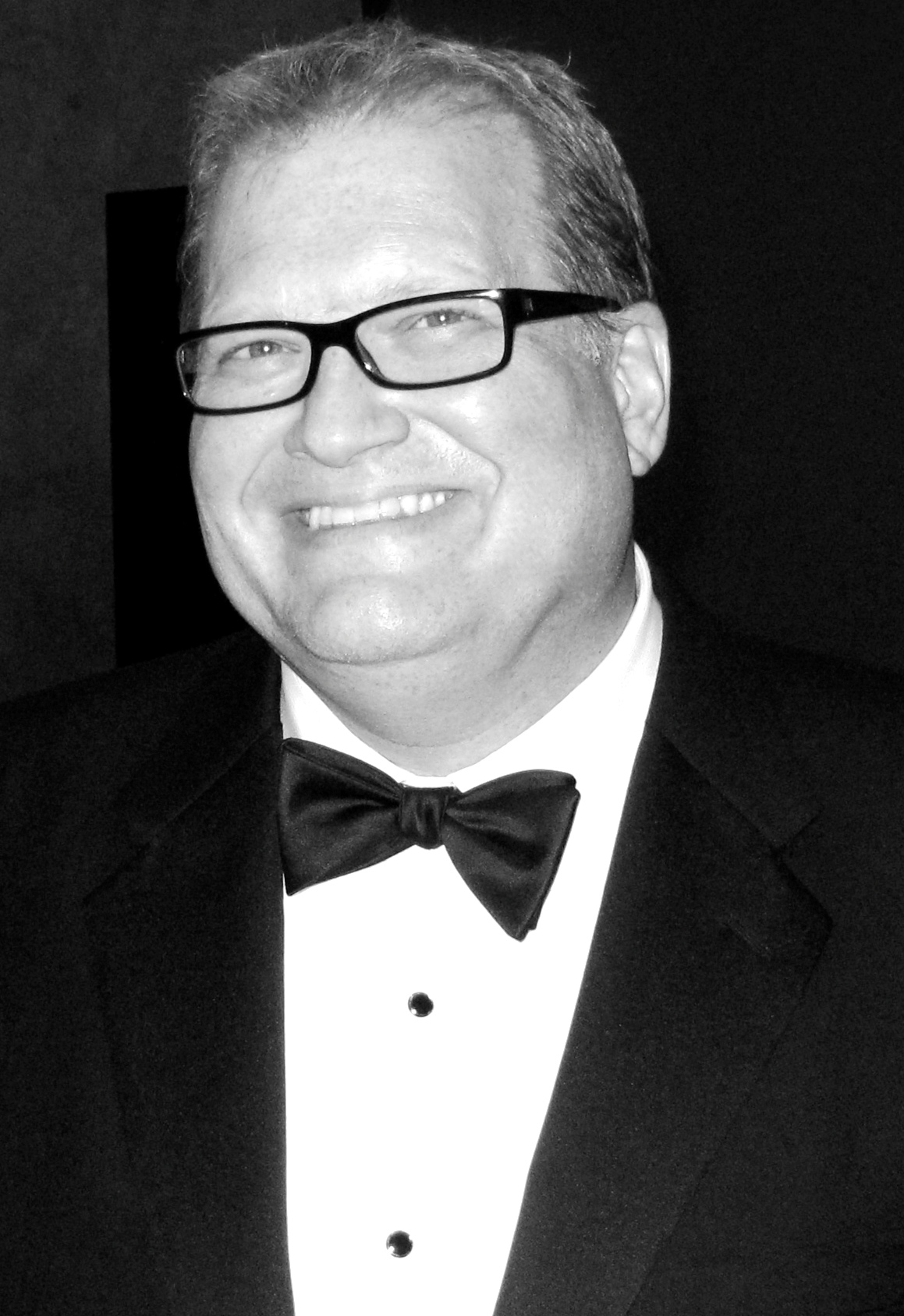
Drew Carey

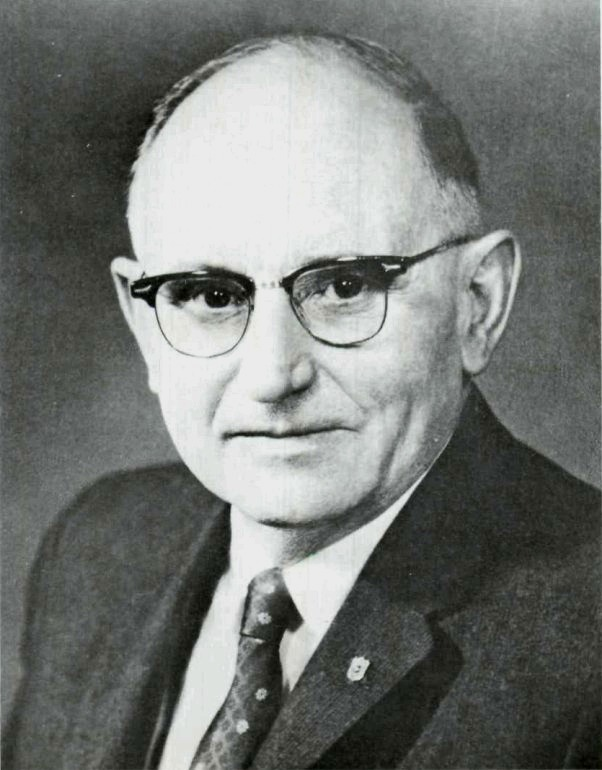
Francis H. Case

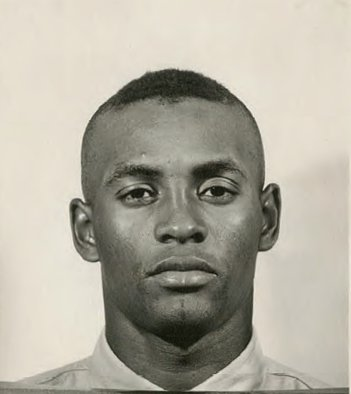
Roberto Clemente

- Robert D. Cabana – NASA space shuttle astronaut, director of Stennis and Kennedy Space Centers
- Enrique Camarena – Mexican-American DEA agent murdered in 1985
- Philip Caputo – author, journalist
- Rod Carew – baseball Hall of Famer
- Drew Carey – Grammy Award-nominated comedian, actor, host of The Price Is Right (2007–present)
- Philip Carey – actor (One Life to Live)
- Timothy Carey – actor known for his roles in Stanley Kubrick and John Cassavetes films (The Killing, Paths of Glory, The Killing of a Chinese Bookie)
- Liz Carmouche – mixed martial arts fighter and Bellator Women's Flyweight World Champion
- Gerald P. Carr – NASA astronaut
- Paul Carr – actor (Executive Action, Akira)
- James Carville – political strategist and manager
- Francis H. Case – represented South Dakota in the U.S. House of Representatives (1937–1950) and the U.S. Senate (1951–1962)
- Ronald D. Castille – Chief Justice of the Supreme Court of Pennsylvania
- John Chafee – Governor of Rhode Island, Secretary of the Navy, U.S. Senator (R-RI)
- Lonny Chapman – actor (Norma Rae, Take the Money and Run)
- Ernie Cheatham – former defensive tackle for the Pittsburgh Steelers and the Baltimore Colts who led troops during the Korean and Vietnam Wars, attaining the rank of Lieutenant General
- Jack Chevigny – American football player, coach, lawyer and Marine Corps officer who was killed in action on the first day of the Battle of Iwo Jima during World War II. He is best known for scoring the famous "that's one for Gipper" touchdown for Knute Rockne's Notre Dame football team on 10 November 1928, against Army at Yankee Stadium.
- Roberto Clemente – baseball Hall of Famer
- Stephen Cochran – country music singer and songwriter
- Mike Coffman – U.S. Congressman representing Colorado
- Tim Colceri – actor and comedian best known for his role in the 1987 Stanley Kubrick film Full Metal Jacket, where he played the door gunner who uttered the much-quoted lines "Get some!" and "Ain't war hell?", he was also originally cast to play Gunnery Sergeant Hartman but was replaced by fellow Marine R. Lee Ermey
- Jerry Coleman – baseball player, announcer
- Eddie Collins – baseball Hall of Famer
- Charles Colson – White House special counsel, Nixon staffer (Watergate), evangelist
- Charlie Conerly – pro football player and College Football Hall of Fame inductee
- Tommy Cook – actor (Panic in the Streets, Stalag 17)
- Gene L. Coon – writer, Star Trek; Coon also wrote under the pseudonym Lee Cronin.
- Courtney Ryley Cooper – writer
- Gordon Cooper – aerospace engineer, test pilot and astronaut (Mercury-Atlas 9, Gemini 5)
- Barry Corbin – actor (No Country for Old Men, WarGames)
- Don Cornelius – Grammy-winning and Emmy Award-nominated television show host and producer (Soul Train)
- Jon Corzine – former Governor of New Jersey and U.S. Senator (D-NJ)
- Bill Cowan – hostage rescue expert, Fox News television commentator
- Brad Crandall – radio personality, voice-over announcer and film narrator, best known for his radio show on WNBC in New York City which aired from March 1964 to September 1971. Crandall also served in the U.S. Air Force.
- Bob Crosby – jazz singer and bandleader (The Jack Benny Program)
- Josh Culbreath – 1956 Summer Olympics 400m hurdles bronze medalist, college track coach with 10 national championships, actor on The Cosby Show
- Walter Cunningham – Apollo 7 astronaut

== D ==
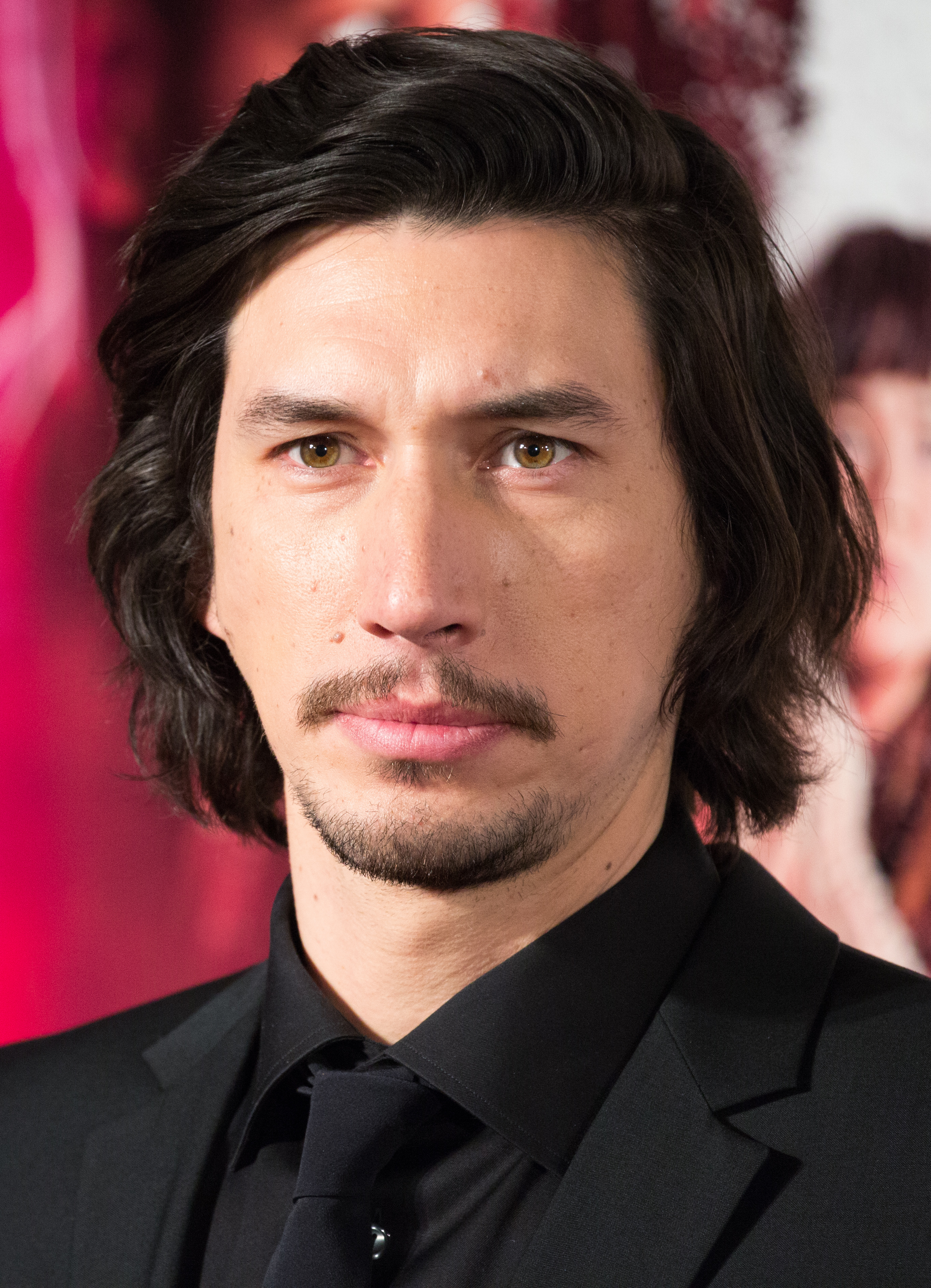
Adam Driver

- Jack Davis – American football player
- Brian Dennehy – Golden Globe and Tony Award-winning and Emmy Award-nominated actor (First Blood)
- James Devereux – U.S. Congressman from Maryland
- Albert Diaz – 4th Circuit Court of Appeals Judge, first Hispanic judge to serve the Fourth Circuit Court of Appeals
- Richard Diebenkorn – artist
- Charles Dierkop – actor (The Sting, Butch Cassidy and the Sundance Kid)
- Bradford Dillman – Golden Globe and Emmy Award-winning actor (Compulsion)
- David Dinkins – 106th Mayor of New York City (1990–1993)
- Nate Dogg – Grammy Award-nominated rapper and singer
- Vince Dooley – head football coach and athletic director of University of Georgia
- Art Donovan – football Hall of Famer
- Terry Downes – British former world middleweight champion boxer
- Paul Douglas – United States Senator and the oldest Marine recruit to have completed recruit training
- Buster Drayton – world champion boxer
- Ben Driebergen – reality television personality best known for competing on and winning Survivor: Heroes vs. Healers vs. Hustlers
- Adam Driver – Academy Award-nominated actor best known for playing Kylo Ren in the Star Wars sequel trilogy
- Don Dubbins – actor (From the Earth to the Moon, Separate but Equal)
- Andre Dubus – author
- Donald Roan Dunagan – child actor best known for providing the voice of young Bambi in Bambi (1942), and also for portraying the young son of Baron Frankenstein in Son of Frankenstein (1939).
- David Douglas Duncan – photographer
- Frank Dux – Canadian-American martial artist and fight choreographer who claimed to have won a secret martial arts tournament called the Kumite in 1975. His alleged victory at the Kumite served as the inspiration for the 1988 film Bloodsport starring Jean-Claude Van Damme.
- Dale Dye – actor, film industry military technical advisor and historian (Platoon)

== E ==
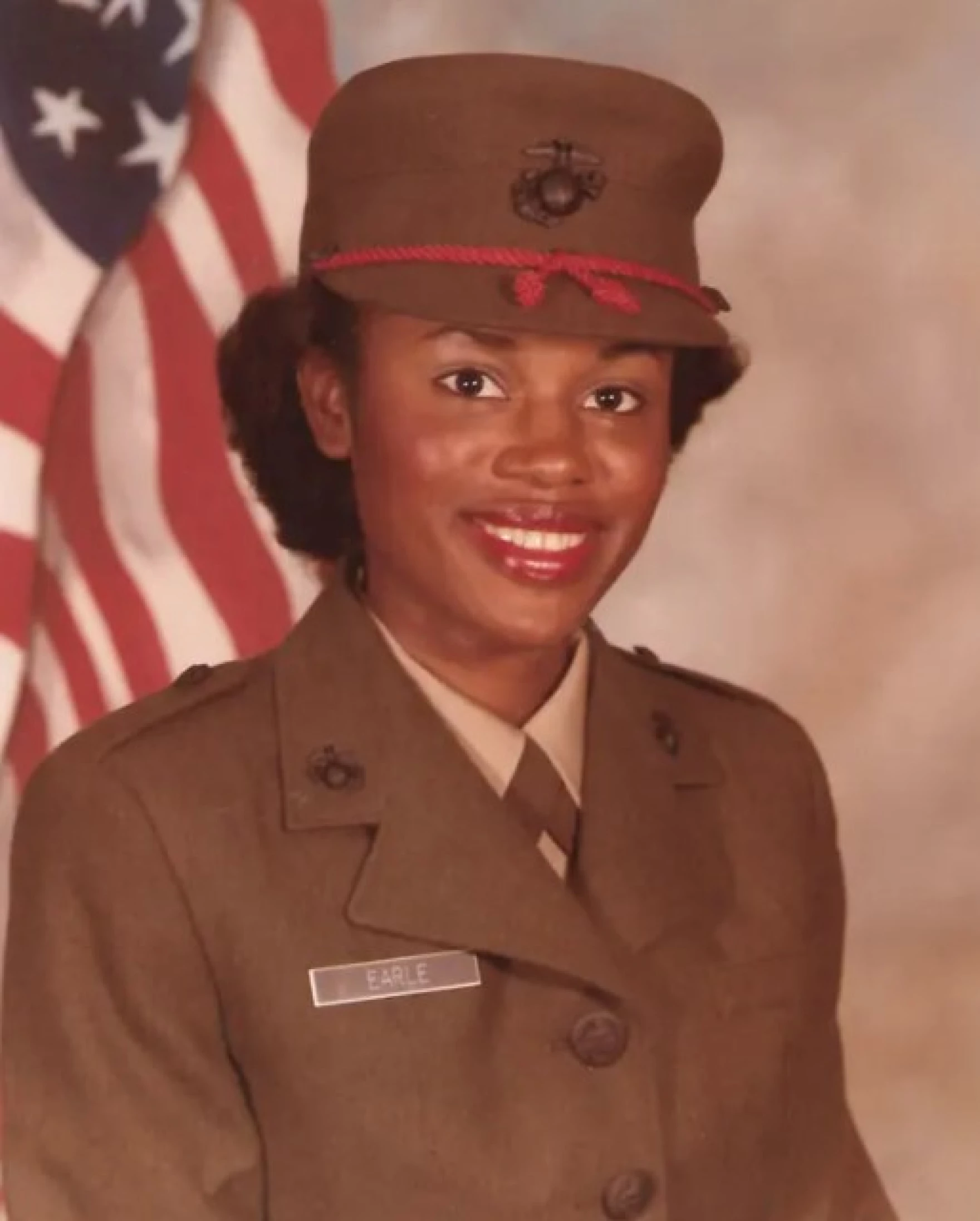
Earle-Sears (then Earle) in the Marines, c. 1983–1986

R. Lee Ermey, in his USMC full-dress uniform.

- Winsome Earle-Sears – 42nd Lieutenant Governor of Virginia (2022–present)
- William A. Eddy – university professor and president, U.S. minister to Saudi Arabia (1943–1946)
- Eddie Egan – actor and former police detective who was the subject of the nonfiction book The French Connection and its 1971 film adaptation
- David Eigenberg – actor (Sex and the City)
- Ronald "R." Lee Ermey – Golden Globe-nominated actor (Full Metal Jacket) and host of Mail Call
- Nicholas Estavillo – NYPD Chief of Patrol (Ret.); became in 2002 the first Puerto Rican and the first Hispanic in the history of the NYPD to reach the three-star rank of Chief of Patrol
- Lacey Evans – female professional wrestler best known for her career in WWE
- Don Everly – Grammy Award-winning musician, member of Rock & Roll Hall of Fame
- Phil Everly – Grammy Award-winning musician, member of Rock & Roll Hall of Fame

== F ==
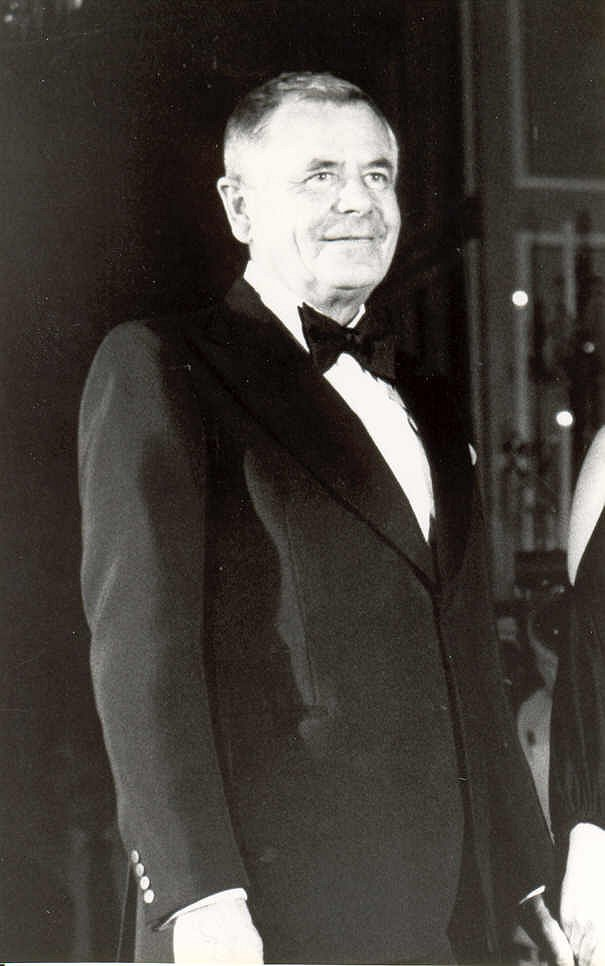
Glenn Ford

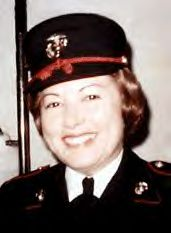
Rose Franco

- Hussein Mohamed Farrah – son and successor of Somali warlord Mohamed Farrah Aidid
- Mike Farrell – Emmy Award-nominated actor and DGA Award-nominated television director (M*A*S*H)
- Freddie Fender – Grammy Award-winning Tejano music recording artist
- Bob Ferguson – songwriter, record producer, and historian
- Jesse Ferguson – heavyweight boxer
- Nathaniel Fick – diplomat and technology entrepreneur
- Edward J. FitzSimons —Attorney and mayor of Mettawa, IL
- Morris Fisher – five-time Olympic gold medalist for shooting
- Bill Fitch – basketball coach
- Pat Flaherty – actor and pro football and baseball player (The Asphalt Jungle, Harvey)
- Shelby Foote – author, American Civil War historian
- Glenn Ford – Golden Globe-winning and BAFTA Award-nominated actor (Gilda)
- Joe Foss – former Governor of South Dakota, first Commissioner of the AFL, former NRA President
- George Franck – football halfback who played for the New York Giants
- Rose Franco – Administrative Assistant to the Secretary of the Navy
- Orville Freeman – 29th Governor of Minnesota
- Hayden Fry – football coach, University of Iowa
- Mark Fuhrman – LAPD detective who became famous during the O.J. Simpson trial for his racial profiling and police brutality tactics

== G ==
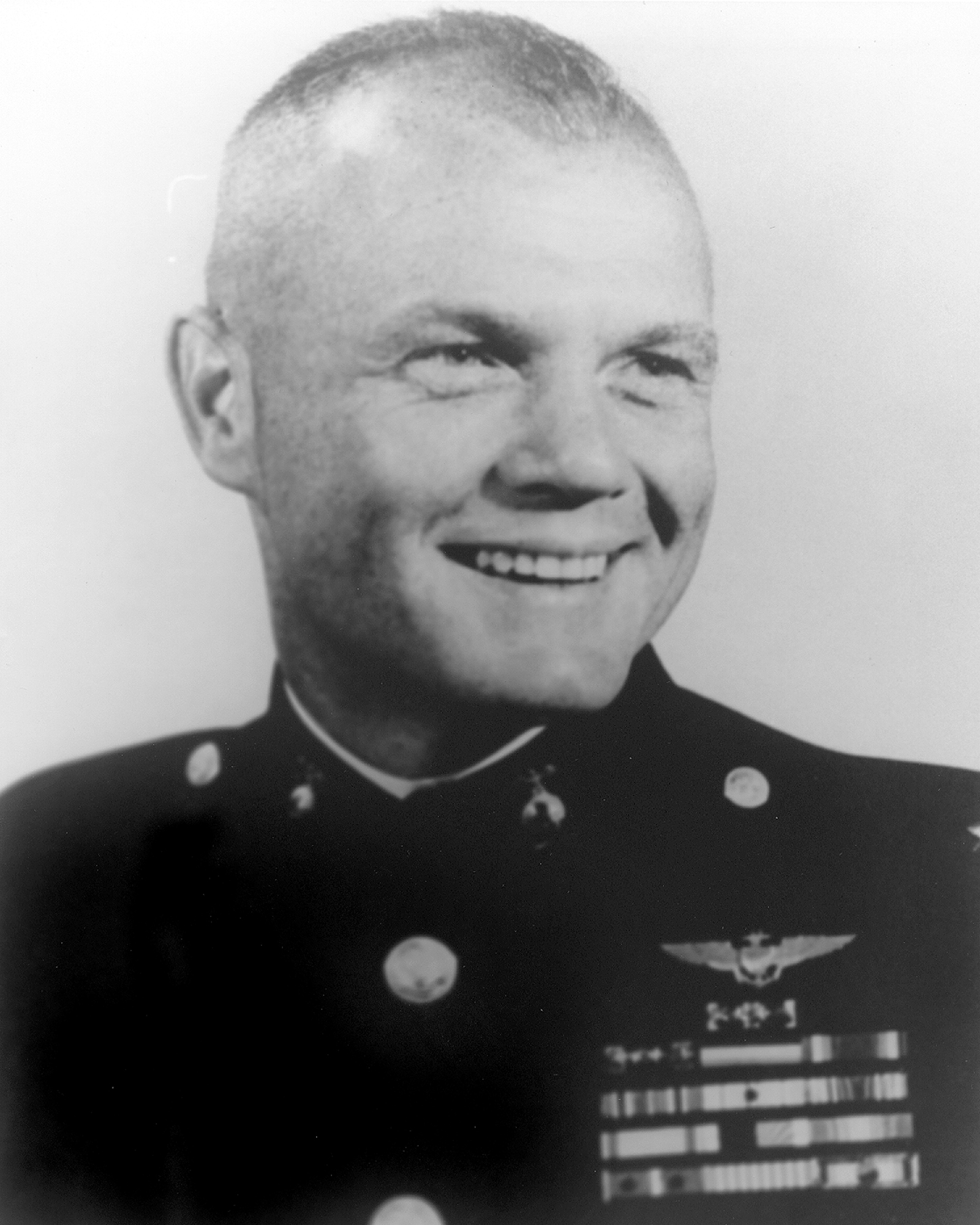
Sen. John Glenn as a Marine colonel

- Verne Gagne – amateur and professional wrestler, football player and actor (The Wrestler)
- Bill Gallo – cartoonist, journalist
- Christopher George – Golden Globe-nominated actor (The Rat Patrol)
- Merlin German – "Miracle Marine", founder of Merlin's Miracles
- Wayne Gilchrest – Republican U.S. Representative from Maryland
- Jack Ging – actor (The A-Team)
- Seamon Glass – actor and stunt performer who also served in the U.S. Merchant Marine (Deliverance, This Is Not a Test)
- John Glenn – astronaut, first American to orbit Earth, oldest man in space, U.S. senator
- Scott Glenn – Saturn Award-nominated actor (The Right Stuff, The Silence of the Lambs)
- John F. Goodman – Marine Corps three-star general and naval aviator
- Josh Gracin – country singer and American Idol contestant
- Calvin Graham – At age 12, Graham became the youngest U.S. serviceman to serve and fight in World War II, serving in the U.S. Navy. The TV movie Too Young the Hero is based on his life. Graham later served in the Marine Corps during the Korean War.
- Bill Greason – former Major League Baseball player of the St. Louis Cardinals and Baptist minister in Birmingham, Alabama
- James Gregory – actor (The Manchurian Candidate, Captain Newman, M.D.)
- Clu Gulager – Saturn Award-nominated actor and Palme d'Or-nominated filmmaker (The Return of the Living Dead)

== H ==
Gustav Hasford

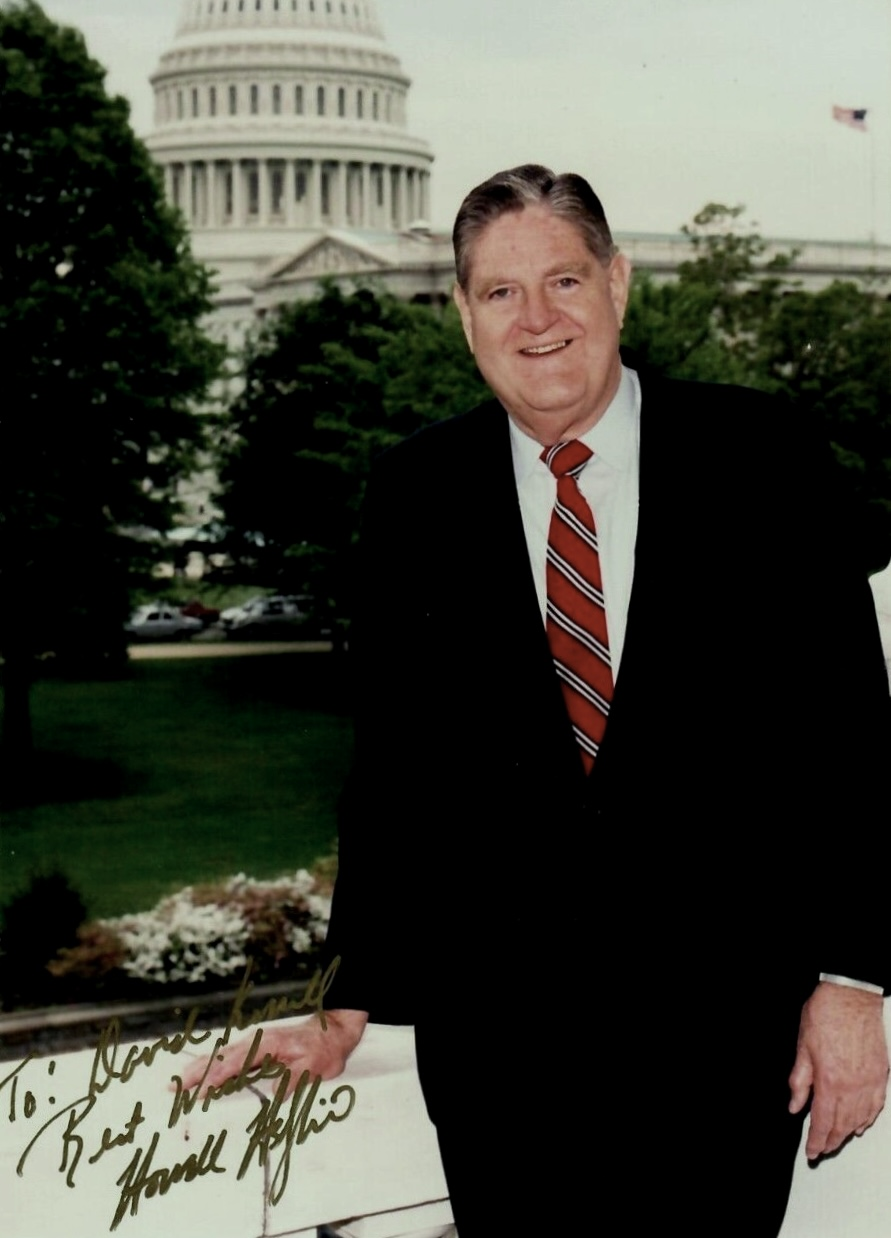
Howell Heflin

- Gene Hackman – Academy Award-winning actor (The French Connection, Crimson Tide)
- David Hahn – American nuclear radiation enthusiast who attempted to build a homemade nuclear reactor at the age of seventeen (aka the "Radioactive Boy Scout" and the "Nuclear Boy Scout")
- Fred Haise – NASA astronaut (Apollo 13 and Space Shuttle Enterprise), who also served in the United States Air Force. Of the 24 men to have ever flown to the moon, Haise is the only Marine.
- Ahmard Hall – NFL football player
- Peter Hansen – Emmy Award-winning actor (General Hospital, The War of the Roses)
- Hugh W. Hardy – pioneer of the 3D seismic method
- Ernie Harwell – sports journalist and Detroit Tigers broadcaster
- Gustav Hasford – author of The Short-Timers and The Phantom Blooper and Oscar-nominated screenwriter (Full Metal Jacket)
- Sterling Hayden – BAFTA Award-nominated actor (Dr. Strangelove or: How I Learned to Stop Worrying and Love the Bomb)
- Bill Hayes – actor and recording artist who also served in the U.S. Navy (The Cardinal, "The Ballad of Davy Crockett")
- Lloyd Haynes – Emmy Award-nominated actor who also served as an officer in the U.S. Navy (Room 222, Ice Station Zebra)
- Louis Hayward – actor (The Saint in New York)
- Howell Heflin – U.S. Senator from Alabama
- Charles W. Henderson – author of books about Carlos Hathcock
- Jamel Herring – professional boxer who held the World Boxing Organization junior lightweight title from 2019 to 2021
- George Roy Hill – Academy Award-winning director of Butch Cassidy and the Sundance Kid and The Sting
- Jack W. Hill – Hill bears the distinction of holding Marine Corps enlisted service number one million (1,000,000).
- Elroy "Crazy Legs" Hirsch – football Hall of Famer
- Gil Hodges – professional baseball player
- Ernie Hudson – actor best known for playing Winston Zeddemore in the Ghostbusters franchise
- Duncan D. Hunter – U.S. Congressman (California-R)
- Douglas G. Hurley – NASA astronaut

== I ==
- Paul Romanovsky Ilyinsky – Mayor of Palm Beach, Florida
- Don Imus – Grammy Award-nominated radio talk show host
- Zach Iscol – entrepreneur, candidate in the 2021 New York City Comptroller election

== J ==
- Keith Jackson – Emmy Award-winning sportscaster
- Brian Girard James – TNA professional wrestler
- Jamesons Travels – YouTuber who specializes in reaction videos to military content
- Bill Janklow – Governor of South Dakota, U.S. Congressman (R-SD)
- Jamey Johnson – Grammy Award-nominated country music artist
- Howard Johnson – American football player for the Green Bay Packers
- George Jones – Grammy Award-winning country music artist

== K ==
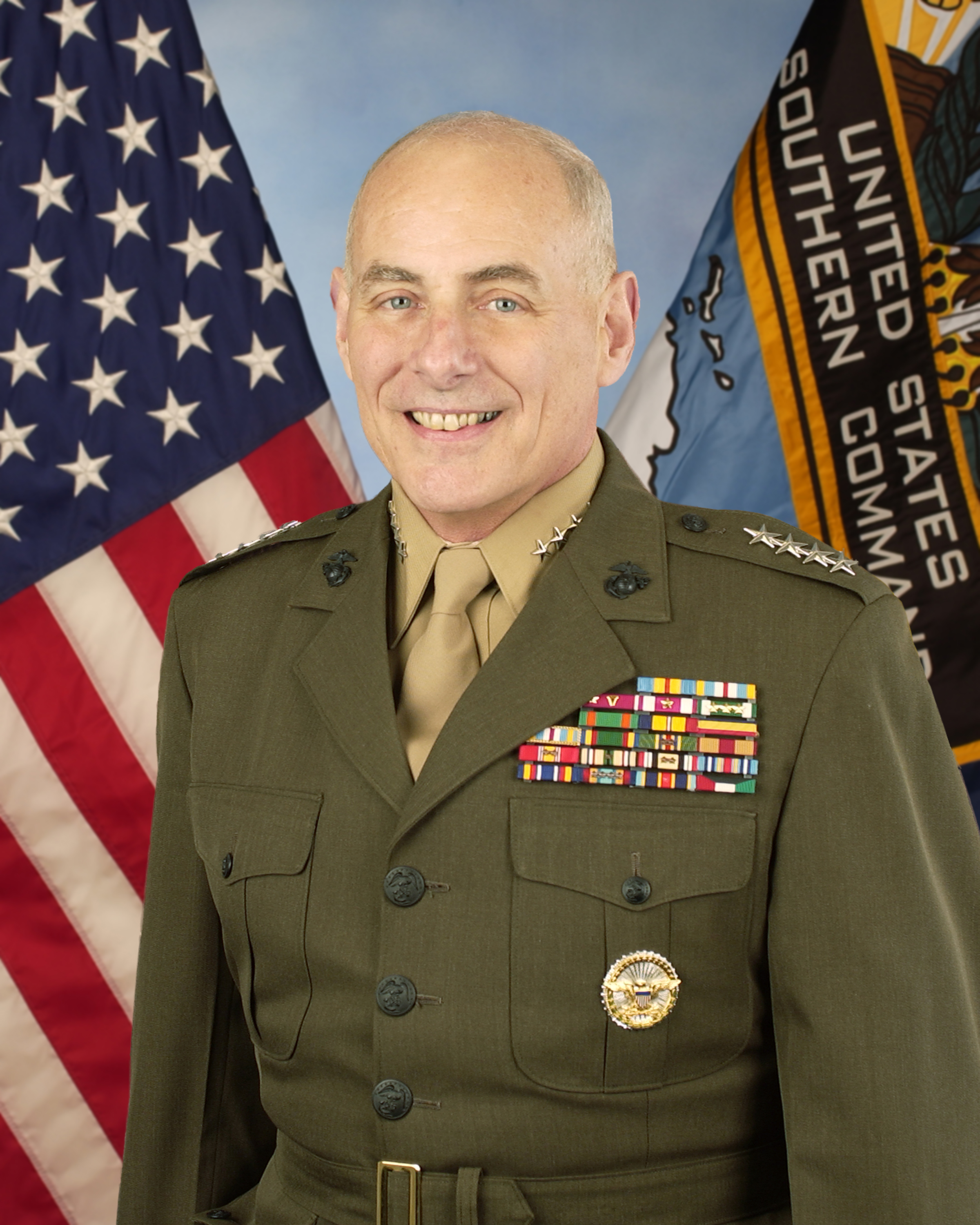
John F. Kelly

- Robert A. Katz – Oscar-nominated film producer (Gettysburg, Selena, Introducing Dorothy Dandridge)
- Bob Keeshan – Captain Kangaroo, original Clarabell the Clown on Howdy Doody
- Harvey Keitel – Oscar-nominated actor (Reservoir Dogs, Pulp Fiction)
- Brian Keith – actor (The Parent Trap)
- Greg Kelly – Fox News broadcast journalist and news reporter
- John F. Kelly – United States Secretary of Homeland Security
- Raymond W. Kelly – police commissioner of the City of New York
- Skip Kenney – U.S. Men's Olympic Swim Coach, Head Swim Coach at Stanford University
- Donald Keyhoe – Marine Corps naval aviator, writer of aviation stories and articles, tour manager for aviation pioneer Charles Lindbergh and author of the 1953 non-fiction book Flying Saucers from Outer Space about UFOs. His book served as the inspiration for the iconic 1956 sci-fi film Earth vs. the Flying Saucers.
- Jake King – owner of the newspaper Samoa News, published in Pago Pago, American Samoa
- Robert Kiyosaki – motivational speaker, author of Rich Dad, Poor Dad
- Russell Klika – U.S. military combat photographer, photojournalist, author of Iraq: Through the Eyes of an American Soldier
- Ron Kovic – Oscar-nominated author and screenwriter (Born on the Fourth of July and its subsequent film adaptation directed by Oliver Stone)
- Ted Kulongoski – Governor of Oregon
- Bill Kurtis – Emmy Award-nominated television journalist, producer, narrator and news anchor
- Gary Kurtz – Oscar-nominated film producer (American Graffiti, Star Wars, The Empire Strikes Back)

== L ==
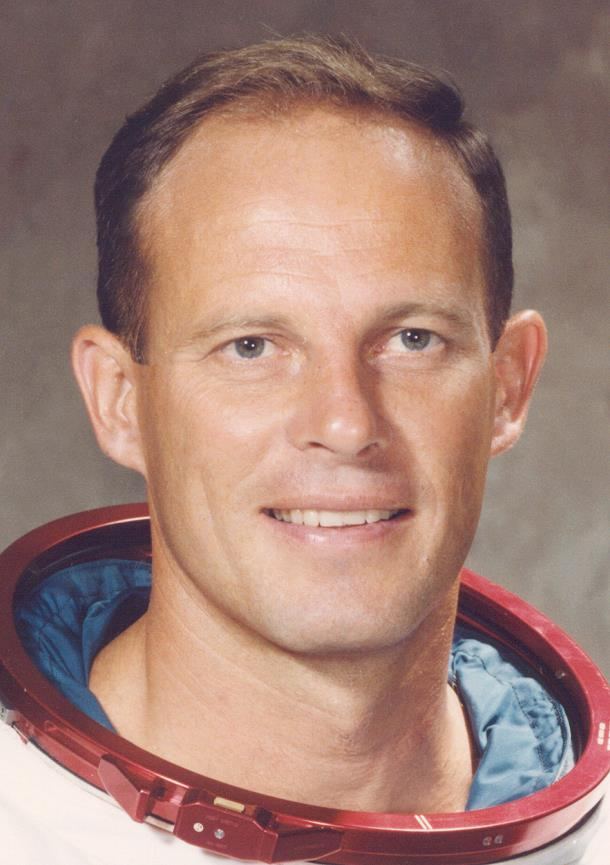
Jack Lousma

- Mills Lane – boxing referee and TV's People's Court judge
- Jim Lange – television game show host, including The Dating Game.
- Dan Lauria – television, stage and film actor (The Wonder Years)
- Eddie LeBaron – professional football player
- Robert Leckie – author of over 40 American war history books who was later portrayed in the HBO miniseries The Pacific (2010)
- Jim Lehrer – journalist, host of PBS' The NewsHour with Jim Lehrer
- Alfred Lerner – financier, Chairman of MBNA Corporation
- Sheldon Lettich – screenwriter, film director and producer (Bloodsport, Rambo III, Double Impact)
- Joe Lisi – actor (Third Watch), retired NYPD Captain
- Carey Loftin – professional stuntman, stunt coordinator and actor (Bullitt, Vanishing Point, Duel, The French Connection)
- Clayton J. Lonetree – spied for Russia in the mid-1980s
- Tommy Loughran – world boxing champion
- Jack R. Lousma – NASA astronaut
- Robert A. Lutz – Vice Chairman of Global Product Development at General Motors Corporation
- Robert Ludlum – author (The Bourne Identity)
- William Lundigan – actor (Men into Space)
- Ted Lyons – baseball Hall of Famer

== M ==
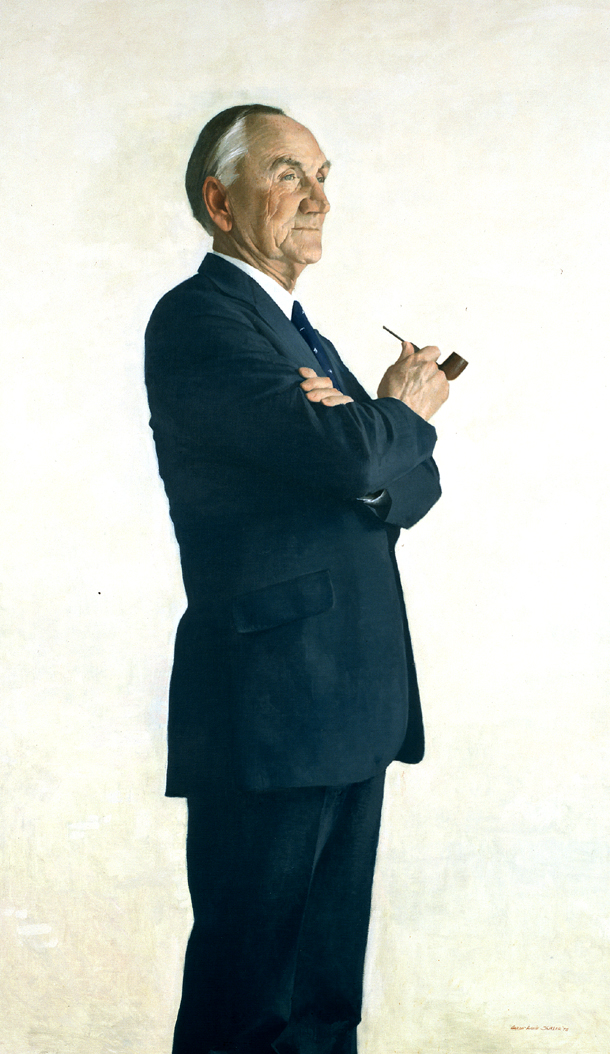
Mike Mansfield

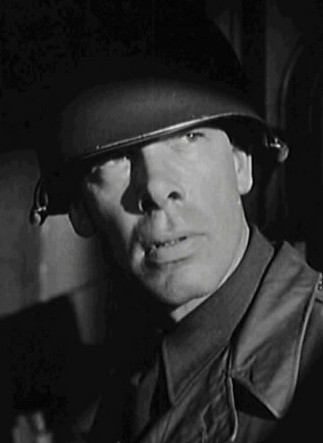
Lee Marvin

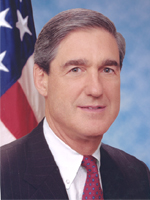
Robert S. Mueller, III

- George Maharis – Emmy Award-nominated and Theatre World Award-winning actor and singer
- Jock Mahoney – actor, stuntman (Tarzan Goes to India, The Range Rider)
- William Manchester – author and historian
- Herman J. Mankiewicz – Oscar-winning screenwriter of Citizen Kane who also served in the United States Army Air Service
- Arman T. Manookian – artist of Hawaiian themes
- Mike Mansfield – U.S. Representative and Senator for Montana, Longest-serving Senate Majority Leader, U.S. Ambassador to Japan, co-author of the Douglas–Mansfield Bill (1951) supporting the U.S. Marine Corps.
- Karl Marlantes – businessman, author of Matterhorn: A Novel of the Vietnam War
- Lee Marvin – Academy Award-winning actor (Cat Ballou)
- Robert F. Marx – pioneer scuba diver and author
- Carlo Mastrototaro – Mafia boss
- Al Matthews – actor and singer known for playing Gunny Apone in Aliens (1986) directed by James Cameron
- Tim Matheson – American Actor, star of Animal House and Fletch
- Bob Mathias – two-time Olympic champion in the decathlon, U.S. Congressman (California-R)
- James Mattis – United States Secretary of Defense
- Sam Mele – baseball player and manager
- Ronald Meyer – Vice Chairman of NBCUniversal, former president and Chief Operating Officer of Universal Studios
- Joseph McCarthy – U.S. Republican Senator from Wisconsin best known for "McCarthyism", in reference to his anti-communist practices which included blacklisting
- Hugh McColl – former chairman and CEO of Bank of America
- Pete McCloskey – U.S. Congressman (California-R)
- Robert C. McFarlane – National Security Advisor to President Ronald Reagan; known for his role in Iran–Contra
- Tug McGraw – Major League relief pitcher and two-time World Series winner
- Paul F. McHale Jr. – U.S. Congressman from Pennsylvania (D), Assistant Secretary of Defense for Homeland Defense
- Ed McMahon – television personality
- Walter Stauffer McIlhenny – served as president of McIlhenny Company, maker of Tabasco brand pepper sauce.
- Sid McMath – Governor of Arkansas
- Steve McQueen – Academy Award-nominated actor who also served in the U.S. Merchant Marine during World War II (Bullitt)
- William McMillan – Olympic gold medalist (1960), 25 meter rapid fire pistol
- Donald E. McQuinn – author of military and science fiction
- Zell Miller – Governor of Georgia, U.S. Senator (D)
- Billy Mills – Olympic gold medalist (1964), 10,000m run
- Tom Monaghan – founder of Domino's Pizza
- Lawrence Montaigne – actor and stuntman (The Great Escape, Star Trek)
- Elizabeth Moon – award-winning fantasy and science fiction author
- Alvy Moore – actor (Green Acres)
- Paul Moore Jr. – 13th Bishop of New York
- Jim E. Mora – NFL head football coach
- Robert S. Mueller III – former director of the FBI (2001-2013)
- Blackjack Mulligan (a.k.a. Robert Windham) – retired professional wrestler
- Robert Mulligan – Academy Award-nominated filmmaker (To Kill a Mockingbird, Summer of '42)
- Michael Murphy – Gemini Award-winning actor (M*A*S*H, Manhattan, Nashville, An Unmarried Woman, Tanner '88, Batman Returns, Magnolia)
- Jimmy Murray – former GM of Philadelphia Eagles and co-founder of Ronald McDonald House Charities
- John Murtha – U.S. Representative (D-PA)
- Franklin Story Musgrave – NASA astronaut
- Clay Myers – photographer (Pawprints of Katrina), animal welfare advocate
- Anton Myrer – author (Once an Eagle)

== N ==
- Art Nalls – pilot/owner of an air show business starring his privately owned Harrier jump jet
- Kelly Lynn Nauyokas – professional female bodybuilder
- James Neilson – Emmy Award-nominated film and television director (Bon Voyage!)
- John Nelson – founder of SWAT
- Oliver Nelson – jazz composer and musician
- Nick Newlin – rugby league player at the 2017 Rugby League World Cup
- Cody Nickson – television personality, winner of The Amazing Race 30, contestant of Big Brother 19
- Carlos I. Noriega – NASA astronaut
- Oliver North – Iran-Contra involvement, political commentator
- Ken Norton – world champion boxer, Boxing Hall of Famer

== O ==
- Warren Oates – National Society and New York Film Critics Circle Award-nominated actor (In the Heat of the Night, The Wild Bunch, Badlands, Stripes)
- Tom O'Brien – former NCAA head football coach, Boston College, NC State
- Gerald S. O'Loughlin – actor (The Rookies)
- Lee Harvey Oswald – accused assassin of U.S. President John F. Kennedy
- Hugh O'Brian – Golden Globe-winning and Emmy Award-nominated actor (The Life and Legend of Wyatt Earp)

== P ==
- Ralph Parcaut – professional wrestler, Middleweight Champion of the World
- Fess Parker – Emmy-nominated film and TV actor
- Bob Parsons – founder and CEO of GoDaddy.com
- Pat Paulsen – Emmy Award-winning actor, comedian and satirist (The Smothers Brothers Show, Night Patrol)
- Sam Peckinpah – Oscar-nominated filmmaker of The Wild Bunch and Straw Dogs
- Paul Pender – Middleweight Boxing Champion
- Jack Pennick – actor (Mister Roberts, The Searchers, The Man Who Shot Liberty Valance)
- Daniel Penny – former Marine acquitted of second-degree manslaughter in the self-defense death of Jordan Neely on a New York City subway on 1 May 2023
- Luke Pensabene – actor and film producer (Friend of the World, South of 8)
- George Peppard – BAFTA Award-nominated actor (Breakfast at Tiffany's)
- Jack Perkins – actor (What's Up, Doc?, Nickelodeon)
- Andy Phillip – Basketball Hall of Famer
- Bum Phillips – NFL head coach
- Charles Phillips – businessman, president of Oracle Corporation
- Robert Phillips – actor and professional football player for the Washington Redskins (The Killers, The Dirty Dozen, Walking Tall: Final Chapter)
- Sidney Phillips – author of You'll be Sor-ree, basis in part for Ken Burns' World War II documentary, The War (2007), and later portrayed in the HBO miniseries The Pacific (2010)
- Tony Poe – CIA paramilitary officer during the Vietnam War
- Charles Portis – author, best known for True Grit
- Lee Powell – actor (The Lone Ranger)
- Tyrone Power – actor (Alexander's Ragtime Band)
- Steven Pressfield – American author of historical fiction, non-fiction and screenplays including his 1995 novel The Legend of Bagger Vance and 2002 non-fiction book The War of Art
- Lewis Chesty Puller – The most decorated Marine in American History
- Lewis Burwell Puller Jr. – Pulitzer Prize-winning author, son of Lewis "Chesty" Puller
- Artimus Pyle – Lynyrd Skynyrd drummer
- Joe Pyne – 1960s conservative talk show host

== R ==
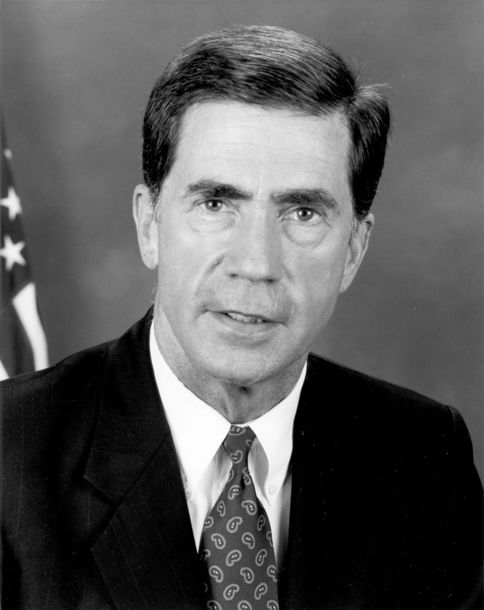
Chuck Robb

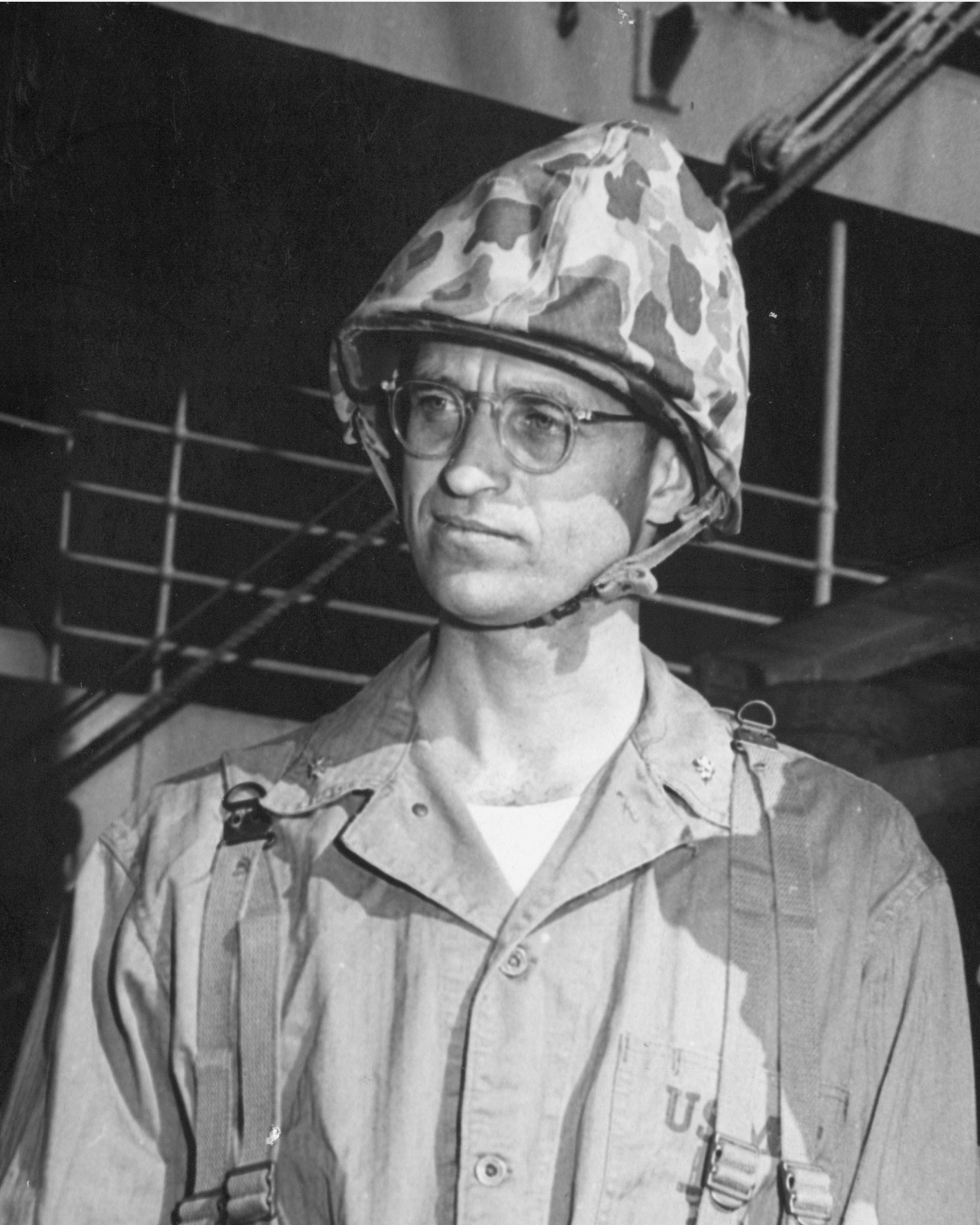
James Roosevelt

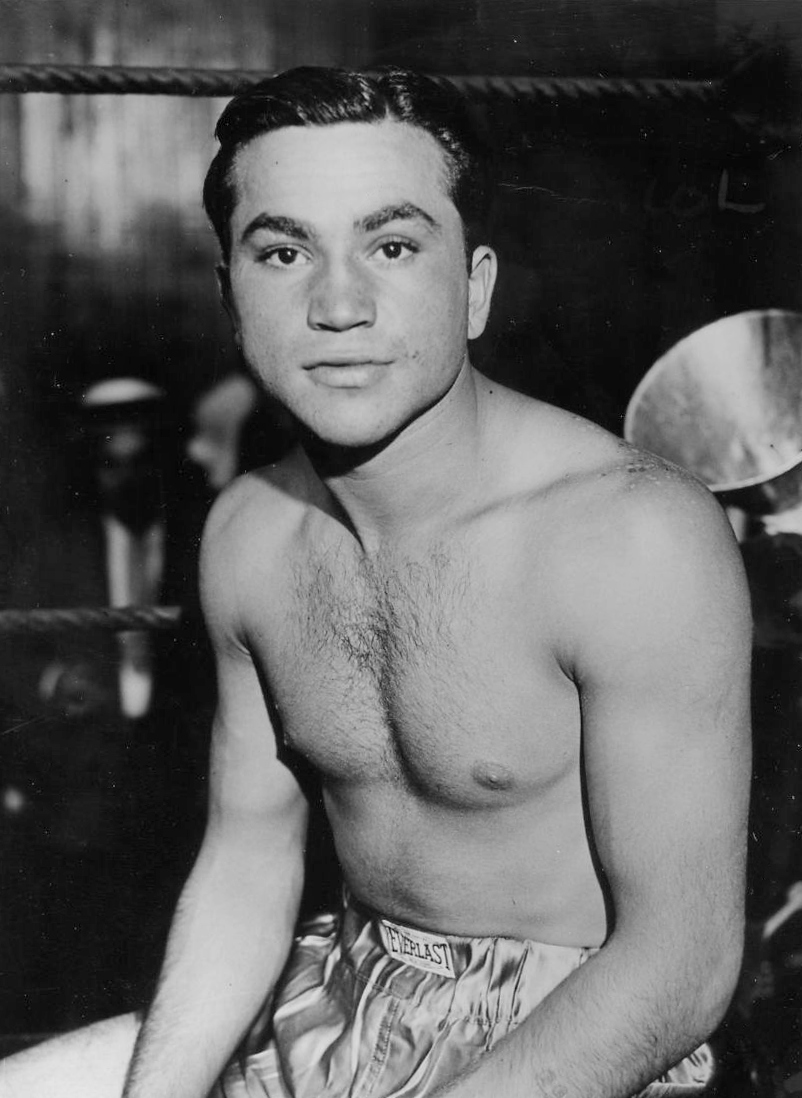
Barney Ross

- C.J. Ramone (b. Christopher Joseph Ward) – musician, former member of The Ramones
- Dan Rather – Emmy and Peabody Award-winning journalist, commentator and former national evening news anchor
- Lawrence G. Rawl – CEO of Exxon (1988–1993)
- Alex Raymond – cartoonist
- Donald Regan – U.S. Secretary of the Treasury, Chief of Staff (Reagan administration)
- Buddy Rich – jazz drummer
- Rudy Reyes – actor and martial arts instructor (Generation Kill)
- Hari Rhodes – actor and author (Shock Corridor, Return to Peyton Place)
- Rob Riggle – actor/comedian (The Daily Show with Jon Stewart)
- Scott Ritter – former United Nations arms inspector, intelligence officer, outspoken opponent of the Bush administration's foreign policy
- Charles S. "Chuck" Robb – Governor of Virginia, U.S. Senator, married to Linda Bird Johnson (daughter of President Lyndon Johnson)
- Pernell Roberts – Emmy Award-nominated actor (Bonanza, Trapper John, M.D.)
- Pat Robertson – evangelist, social commentator
- James Roosevelt – U.S. Congressman (California); son of FDR, former Marine Raider
- Barney Ross – world champion boxer, Boxing Hall of Famer
- Dan Rossi – American hot dog vendor in New York City
- Arthur Rowe – screenwriter and television producer (The Magnificent Seven Ride!, Fantasy Island)
- John Russell – actor (Lawman)
- Mark Russell – political satirist
- J.T. Rutherford – Lawyer and Democratic U.S. Congressional Representative from 1955 to 1963
- Robert Ryan – Oscar-nominated actor (The Wild Bunch, Crossfire)

== S ==
Tony Santiago

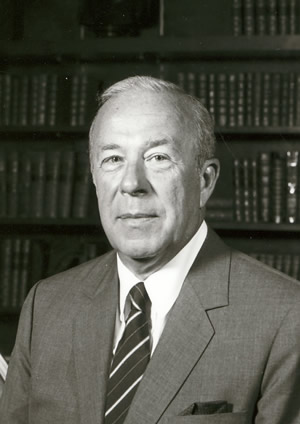
George Shultz

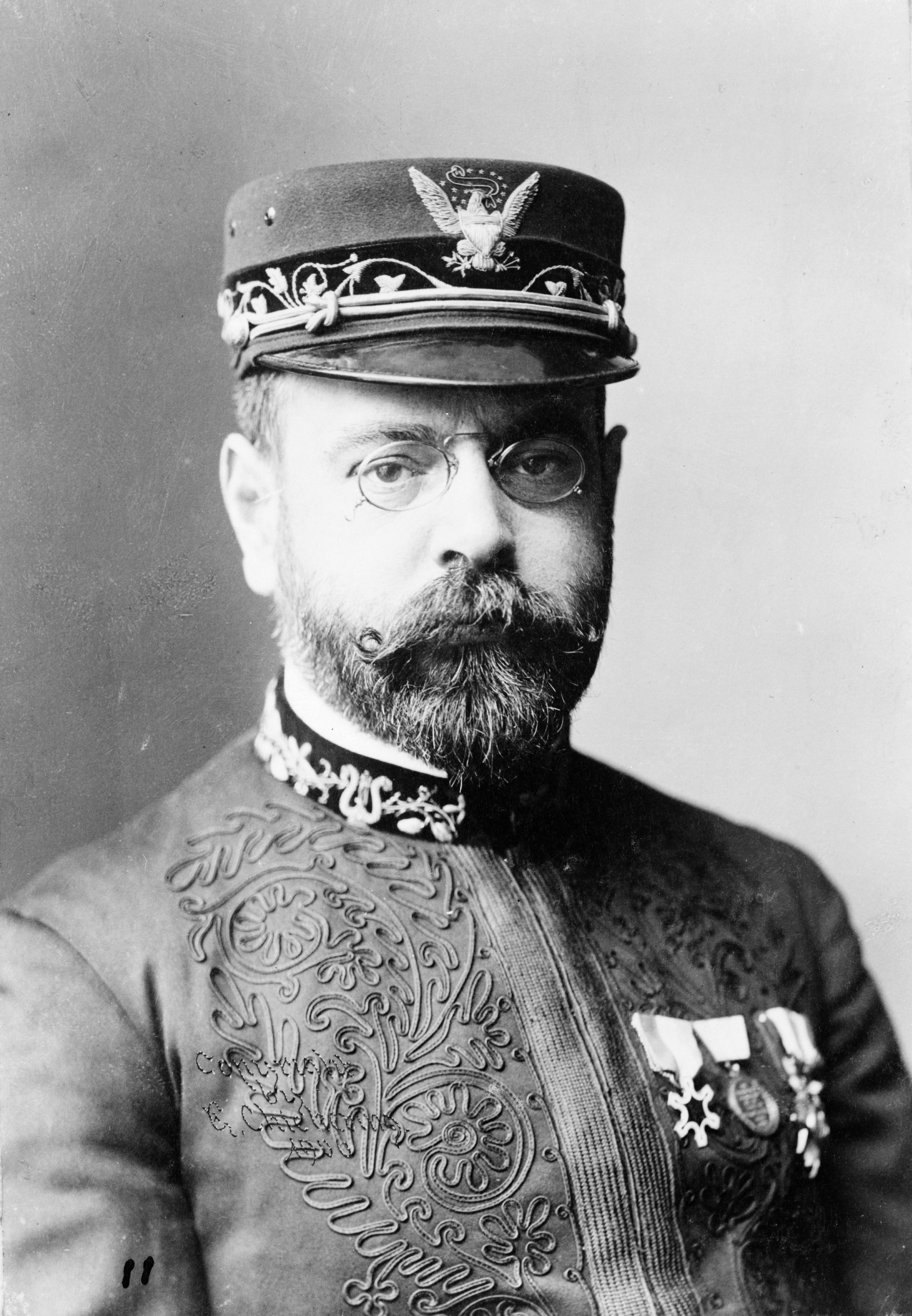
John Philip Sousa

- Tony Santiago – military historian
- Jim Sasser – U.S. senator from Tennessee
- George C. Scott – Academy Award-winning actor (Patton)
- Mike Scotti – author and producer of the documentary film Severe Clear
- Tom Seaver – baseball Hall of Famer
- Walter Seltzer – film producer (One-Eyed Jacks, The Omega Man, Soylent Green)
- Shaggy – musician and singer
- John Patrick Shanley – playwright, screenwriter, and director
- Bernard Shaw – CNN news anchor
- Mark Shields – journalist
- James Shigeta – Golden Globe-winning Japanese-American actor (Die Hard, The Yakuza)
- Alana Shipp – American/Israeli IFBB professional bodybuilder
- Scott Shriner – bass guitarist, member of Weezer
- George Shultz – economist, U.S. Secretary of State, Secretary of Labor, Secretary of the Treasury
- Oliver Sipple – saved President Gerald Ford's life during an assassination attempt
- Otis Sistrunk – defensive tackle, Oakland Raiders, National Football League
- Eugene Sledge – author of With the Old Breed: At Peleliu and Okinawa, basis in part for Ken Burns' World War II documentary, The War (2007), and later portrayed in the HBO miniseries The Pacific (2010)
- Harold "Dutch" Smith – diver, representing the US in the Summer Olympics in 1928 and 1932 (1 gold, 1 silver medal)
- Frederick W. Smith – businessman, founder of FedEx
- W. Thomas Smith, Jr. – author, journalist
- Guillermo Söhnlein – cofounder of OceanGate together with Stockton Rush, the company that later went on to build the Titan (submersible)
- John Philip Sousa – composer, conductor/orchestra leader
- Anthony Sowell – Ohio serial murder suspect
- Thomas Sowell – economist, social commentator, and author
- Taylor Spadaccino – Fitness and glamour model
- Leon Spinks – world boxing champion
- Robert C. Springer – NASA astronaut.
- Scott H. Stalker – Command Senior Enlisted Leader of the United States Cyber Command, and the National Security Agency
- Laurence Stallings – playwright, screenwriter, literary critic, journalist, novelist and photographer best known for the 1924 play What Price Glory
- Brian Stann – World Extreme Cagefighting Light Heavyweight champion, Ultimate Fighting Championship fighter
- Ernie Stautner – NFL football player and coach
- Richard Steele – boxing referee
- Robert J. Stevens – Retired Chairman, President and chief executive officer of Lockheed Martin Corporation
- Tuffy Stone – chef and competitive barbecue master
- Eugene Stoner – designer of the AR-15 rifle, adopted by the US military as the M-16
- Michael R. Strobl – author, co-screenwriter of the 2009 Award-winning movie Taking Chance, inspired by his own story as the final military escort of Lance Corporal Chance Phelps
- Frederick W. Sturckow – NASA astronaut and shuttle commander
- William Styron – Pulitzer Prize-winning author
- Arthur Ochs Sulzberger – publisher of The New York Times
- Bo Svenson – Saturn Award-winning actor best known for the Walking Tall film and television series
- Charles R. "Chuck" Swindoll – evangelical Christian pastor, radio preacher
- Anthony Swofford – author of the memoir Jarhead

== T ==
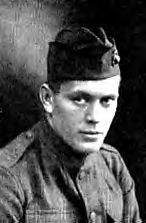
Gene Tunney

- Steven W. Taylor – Oklahoma Supreme Court justice
- Frank M. Tejeda – U.S. Congressman from Texas
- Jerald terHorst – press secretary (1974) for President Gerald Ford
- Craig Thomas – U.S. Senator from Wyoming (R)
- Jason Thomas – saved two police officers' lives on September 11 who were trapped in the rubble of the towers
- Bernard Trainor – author, journalist, NBC military analyst
- Lee Trevino – PGA Tour golfer and member of the World Golf Hall of Fame
- Bobby Troup – actor, singer, songwriter of (Get Your Kicks on) Route 66
- Daniel Truhitte – actor best known for playing Rolf Gruber, the young Austrian telegram delivery boy in The Sound of Music (1965)
- William M. Tuck – U.S. Congressman from Virginia, Governor of Virginia
- Gene Tunney – world boxing champion, Boxing Hall of Famer
- Martin Tytell – owner of the Tytell Typewriter Company who became known as "Mr. Typewriter, New York"

== U ==
- Leon Uris – author (Exodus, Trinity, Battle Cry)

== V ==
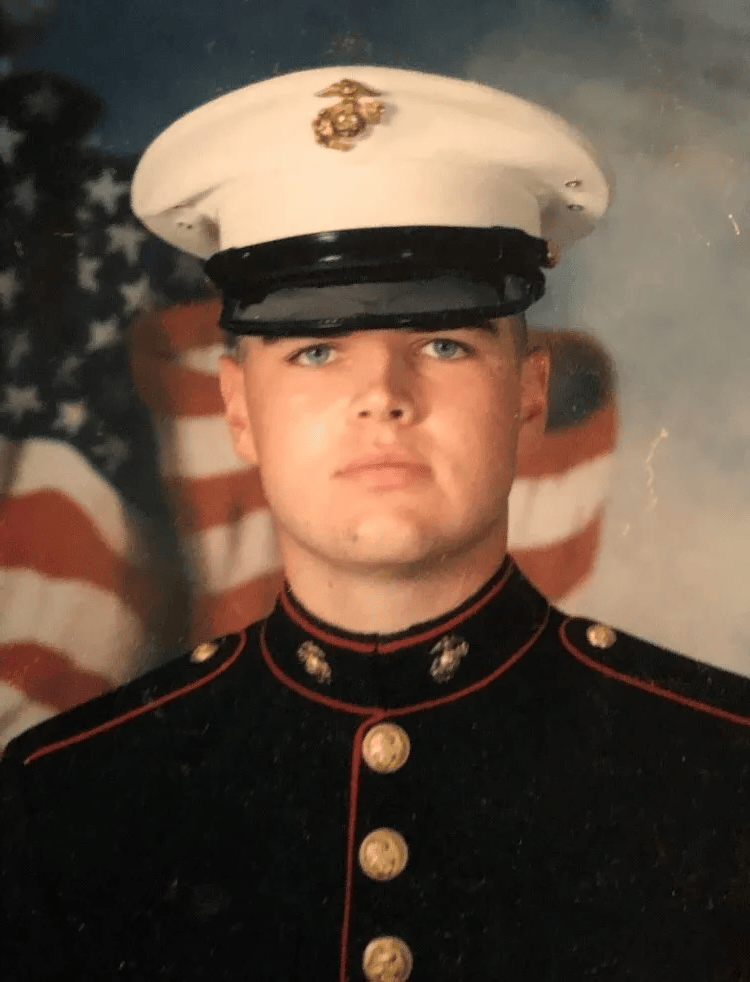
Vance (then Hamel) in the Marines, 2003

- JD Vance – 50th Vice President of the United States (2025–present), writer and venture capitalist known for his memoir Hillbilly Elegy
- Bill Veeck – baseball team owner, baseball Hall of Famer

== W ==
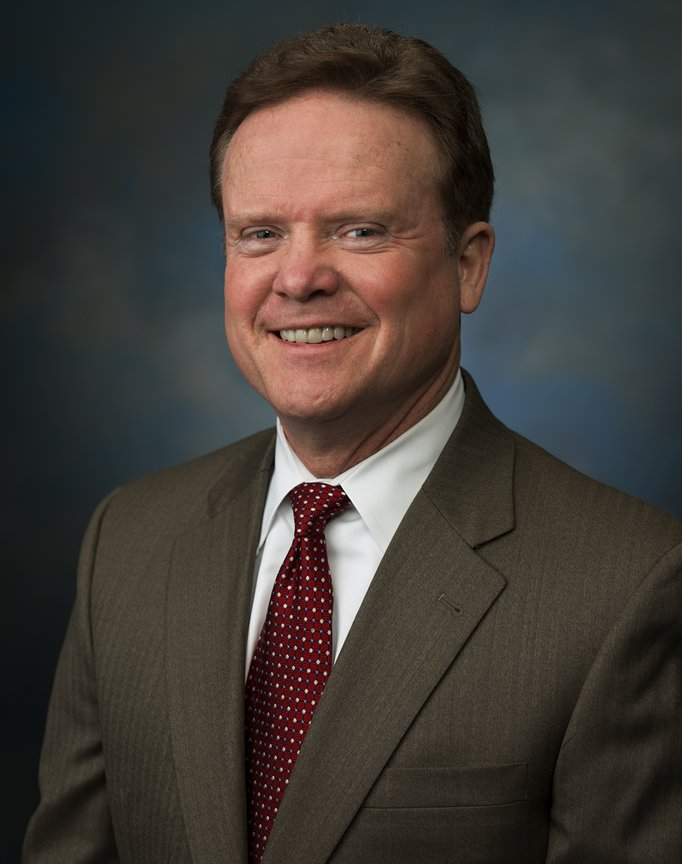
Jim Webb

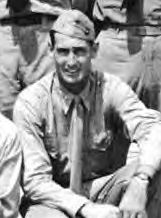
Ted Williams

- Ralph Waite – Emmy Award-nominated actor (The Waltons)
- Walter Walsh – FBI agent, award-winning shooter
- Joseph Wambaugh – bestselling American writer (The Onion Field)
- John Warner – former Secretary of the Navy, U.S. Senator from Virginia
- Charles Waterhouse – artist
- Mike Weaver – world boxing champion
- James E. Webb – second Administrator of NASA
- James H. "Jim" Webb – U.S. Senator (D-VA), former U.S. Secretary of the Navy, author
- Robert Webber – actor (12 Angry Men, The Dirty Dozen)
- Preston A. Wells Jr. – businessman and Heritage Foundation board member
- Chuck Wepner – boxer, often named as the inspiration for the Rocky movie series
- Bing West – author, former Assistant Secretary of Defense in the Reagan Administration
- Floyd "Red Crow" Westerman – Dakota Sioux musician, country music singer, political activist and actor
- Jo Jo White – former NBA basketball player with the Boston Celtics
- Charles Whitman – University of Texas clocktower sniper
- James Whitmore – Oscar-nominated actor (Give 'em Hell, Harry!, The Shawshank Redemption)
- Larry Wilcox – actor (CHiPs)
- Steve Wilkos – TV host, Chicago Police Department veteran
- Montel Williams – Emmy Award-winning talk show host who later served as a cryptology officer in the U.S. Navy; retired as a lieutenant commander after 22 years of service (The Montel Williams Show)
- Ted Williams – baseball Hall of Famer
- Michael Wilson – Oscar-winning screenwriter (A Place in the Sun, The Bridge on the River Kwai, Lawrence of Arabia, Planet of the Apes)
- Pete Wilson – former Governor of California
- Terry Wilson – actor (Wagon Train, Westworld)
- Jonathan Winters – Emmy and Grammy Award-winning and Golden Globe-nominated comedian, actor, author, television host and artist (It's a Mad, Mad, Mad, Mad World)
- Ed Wood – director (Glen or Glenda and Plan 9 from Outer Space)
- Jeremiah Wright – controversial pastor of Trinity United Church of Christ in Chicago

== Y ==
- Burt Young – Oscar-nominated actor, artist and former boxer (Rocky, Chinatown)
- Otis Young – actor (The Last Detail, Rawhide)

== Z ==
- George D. Zamka – NASA astronaut
- Douglas Zembiec – Marine Corps officer and member of the CIA's Special Activities Division's Ground Branch who was killed in action while serving in Operation Iraqi Freedom
- Anthony Zinni – foreign policy analyst and television commentator
- Barry Zorthian – press officer for 4 1/2 years during the Vietnam War

== See also ==
- List of historically notable United States Marines
- List of United States Marine Corps astronauts
- List of United States Marine Corps four-star generals
- List of Medal of Honor recipients
