= Famous Crime Scene =

- Famous Crime Scene logo, with yellow and black.
- Country of origin: United States
- No. of seasons: 1
- No. of episodes: 7

Production
- Running time: 21 min.

Original release
- Network: VH1
- Release: February 12 – March 26, 2010

Famous Crime Scene was a VH1 show that follows a documentary format. This show exposes the evidence and the last moments of a celebrity and the subsequent chaos about their deaths; all this through the view of special investigators, and even exposes the point of view and details that only the ones present are able to give.

Famous Crime Scene received positive reviews from critics, with praise for it design, role, and performance. Despite the positive reviews, Famous Crime Scene has never received a new season, due to lack of development.

== Episodes ==
No.	Title	Original release date
1	"Tupac Shakur"	February 12, 2010
Tupac Shakur, the 25-year-old rap superstar was brutally gunned down on the Las Vegas Strip. Learn how doctors helped Tupac fight for his life and how police missed crucial chances to find the killer--who remains unidentified to this day. Go deep inside one of the most notorious celebrity shootings of all time.
2	"Anna Nicole Smith"	February 19, 2010
The former model and media sensation was a symbol of trainwreck TV--but also a grieving mother whose death may have involved foul play. Find out how Anna Nicole spent her sad final days in a Florida hotel room, what ultimately killed her and why authorities believe people close to her were responsible.
3	"Michael Jackson"	February 26, 2010
Follow LAPD detectives in their investigation of the sudden and shocking death of the King of Pop. Toxicology reports confirm he died from a combination of prescription medications and a heavy-duty anesthesia drug called Propofol, all administered by a mysterious physician who was treating Jackson at home in the last month of his life. But other doctors were also giving Michael drugs up until his final days, some administered through his various aliases. Will this ongoing homicide investigation turn into a criminal case? Who will be responsible for this music legend's tragic and controversial death?
4	"John Lennon"	March 4, 2010
Probe the twisted mind of Mark David Chapman, the man who shockingly ended a music legend's life in 1980. Follow the NYPD's efforts to prove Chapman's sanity in preparation for a trial that never came. The real inside story of arguably music's most disturbing and high-profile death ever.
5	"Selena"	March 12, 2010
Learn the real story of Selena's shocking murder at the hands of the former president of her fan club. With the help of eyewitnesses, first responders and law enforcement officials involved in the case, go beyond the crime scene tape at the Days Inn in Corpus Christi, Texas, for details of a shooting that left fans around the world devastated.
6	"Marvin Gaye"	March 18, 2010
In 1984, this Motown legend was shot to death in his Los Angeles home--by his own father. Through interviews with family, friends, and investigators, unravel the story and find out whether his death was cold-blooded murder, a family dispute gone horribly wrong, or suicide born out of drug-induced depression.
7	"The Notorious B.I.G."	March 26, 2010
Rap legend Biggie Smalls was shot to death after leaving a star-studded party in Los Angeles. Today, the controversial case remains unsolved. Discover how this infamous murder and investigation unfolded, through the eyes of cops assigned to the case.

== See also ==
- The Killing of Tupac Shakur by crime author Cathy Scott (appeared in "Tupac Shakur" episode, 2010)
- The Murder of Biggie Smalls by crime author Cathy Scott (appeared in "The Notorious B.I.G." episode, 2010)
