= Clay Myers =

Clay Myers may refer to:

- H. Clay Myers Jr. (1927–2004), American politician in Oregon
- Clay Myers (photographer), American photographer, videographer and animal welfare advocate
