= The Rough Guide to True Crime =

2009 book by Cathy Scott

- Author: Cathy Scott
- Language: English
- Genre: True crime, Reference
- Publisher: Penguin Books
- Publication date: August 2009
- Publication place: United States, United Kingdom
- Media type: Print (Paperback)
- Pages: 336 pp
- ISBN: 978-1858283852

The Rough Guide to True Crime is a non-fiction paperback reference guide to national and international true crime cases by the American crime writer Cathy Scott. It was released in the UK and US in August 2009 by Penguin Books through its Rough Guides imprint.

== Summary ==
The Rough Guide to True Crime is a compendium of diverse cases, including historic crimes, with sections broken down by the type of offenses and by who committed them. It is illustrated with black-and-white photos. Forensic expert Dr Louis B. Schlesinger contributes psychological profiles of a wide range of perpetrators, including serial killers, murderers, hit men and burglars. Among the book's more notorious cases are those of the serial killer Jeffrey Dahmer, the mob hitman Richard "The Iceman" Kuklinski, John Wayne Glover ("The Granny Killer") and the British "Doctor of Death", Harold Shipman.

The book's section about the mob enforcer Herbert Blitzstein was selected for inclusion in the July 2012 retrospective of crime writing, Masters of True Crime: Chilling Stories of Murder and the Macabre.

Appearing on BlogTalkRadio's True Murder show, the author described cases from the 19th century covered in her book as episodes from "a different time in America, where people like Billy the Kid could walk in and just rob a bank" and get away with it. While "there was nothing glamorous about what they did," Scott said, "they are a part of lore."

== Critical reception ==
The book was featured at BookExpo America 2009's trade fair in DK Publishing's booth in New York City.

In a review, True Crime Book Reviews wrote, "From the Moors murders and Harold Shipman, to the murder of 2pac, this guide illuminates the psychology in play behind the most intriguing crimes in history, from the absurd to the appalling. The Rough Guide to True Crime explores the best of the haunting genre of True Crime."

== Contents ==
- Outlaws: "The money, or your life"
- Heists and Robberies
- Kidnapped
- White-collar Crime
- Deception: The Art of the Con
- Homicide
- Serial Killers
- Organized Crime
- Dirty Cops and Bad Apples
- Lesser Violations
- Cybercrime
