= Thug Life =

Thug life may refer to:

- Thug Life (group), a hip hop group including Tupac Shakur
  - Thug Life, Volume I, the only album released by Thug Life
- Tupac: A Thug Life, a book about Shakur
- Thug Life (2001 film), a 2001 American crime drama film directed by Greg Carter
- Thug Life (2025 film), an Indian action drama film directed by Mani Ratnam
- Thug Life (soundtrack), of the 2025 film
- "Thug Life", a song from the album Iridescence by Brockhampton
- "Thug Life", a song from the album Issa Album by 21 Savage
- "Thug Life", a song from the album Pray 4 Love by Rod Wave
- "Thug life", a song by Trippie Redd

== See also ==
- Thug Law: Thug Life Outlawz Chapter 1, a compilation album by Big Syke
