= McQuinn =

McQuinn is a surname. Notable people with the surname include:

- Delores McQuinn (born 1954), American politician
- Donald E. McQuinn (born 1930), American writer
- George McQuinn (1910–1978), American baseball player
- Harry McQuinn (1906–1986), American racecar driver
- Jason McQuinn, American anarchist

== See also ==
- Quinn (disambiguation)
