= Cathy Scott =

American journalist (born c. 1950)

- Born: Cathleen Scott c.1950 (age 75–76); San Diego, California, U.S.
- Education: University of Redlands (1990); Grossmont Community College (1970)
- Occupations: Author; journalist; biographer
- Spouse: Ray Somers (divorced)
- Children: 1 (Raymond Somers Jr.)
- Parent(s): Eileen Rose Busby and James (Jim) Scott
- Relatives: J. Michael Scott (brother), Seraphim Rose (uncle), Esther Rose (grandmother)
- Writing career
- Genres: True crime; Narrative nonfiction; Historical; Mystery
- Subject: Murder
- Notable works: The Killing of Tupac Shakur; Murder of a Mafia Daughter; The Murder of Biggie Smalls
- Movement: True crime
- Website: cathyscott.com

Cathleen Scott (born c. 1950) is a Los Angeles Times and New York Times bestselling American true crime author and investigative journalist who penned the biographies and true crime books The Killing of Tupac Shakur and The Murder of Biggie Smalls, both bestsellers in the United States and United Kingdom, and was the first to report Shakur's death. She grew up in La Mesa, California, and later moved to Mission Beach, California, where she was a single parent to a son, Raymond Somers Jr. Her hip-hop books are based on the drive-by shootings that killed the rappers six months apart in the midst of what has been called the West Coast-East Coast war. Each book is dedicated to the rappers' mothers. She is currently writing a biography of the late true crime author Ann Rule.

== Early life and education ==
Scott was born in San Diego, California. She attended Helix High School in La Mesa, California, Grossmont College and graduated with a bachelor's degree from the University of Redlands in 1990.

Scott is the daughter of author Eileen Rose Busby and James (Jim) Scott, a Senior Olympics winner who helped pioneer and develop the game of racquetball. She is the granddaughter of California artist Esther Rose and Frank Rose (a sports writer at the Two Harbors, Minnesota, newspaper in the 1920s), and niece of Russian Orthodox hieromonk Seraphim Rose. Her brother is scientist and author J. Michael Scott. Her twin sister, Cordelia Mendoza, is an antiquarian and appraiser.

== Career ==
Scott wrote poetry as a teenager and worked on the Helix High School yearbook during her senior year. Her first full-time newspaper position was as a reporter for the Beach & Bay Press in Mission Beach and Pacific Beach, in 1987. She also freelanced for the Mira Mesa Scripps Ranch Sentinel. She then became business editor of the La Jolla Light weekly newspaper after winning a Best of Show journalism award out of 1,200 entries from the San Diego Press Club. She then moved to a daily paper, the Vista Press, in North San Diego County, part of William McPherson Papers. She left the Vista Press to string as a correspondent for the Associated Press and The San Diego Union-Tribune. While reporting in San Diego, she was a member of the San Diego Press Club.

In 1993, she moved to the Mojave Desert as a crime beat reporter for the Las Vegas Sun, where she worked until 1998, then freelanced for The New York Times and Reuters News Service and wrote true-crime books and biographies. While still at the Sun, in 1997, her first book, The Killing of Tupac Shakur, was released. Huntington Press released the book on the first anniversary of Shakur's death, issuing a 25,000-copy first printing, according to Publishers Weekly, with a second edition released in 2002. The Killing of Tupac Shakur was number 2 on the Los Angeles Times bestseller list in paperback nonfiction the week of June 11, 2000. The Murder of Biggie Smalls the same year made The New York Times bestseller list in nonfiction hardcover the week of October 15, 2000.

Scott and fellow journalist Jeff German were at the murder scene and the first reporters to break the national story in the Las Vegas Sun of the gangland killing in 1997 of Las Vegas and Chicago Outfit mob associate Herbert “Fat Herbie” Blitzstein in Las Vegas.

Scott's article, first published in George magazine, was included in the 2005 anthology Tupac: A Thug Life, a compilation of national magazine writers released by Plexus Publishing. She contributed to two other anthologies, The Big Book of Social Media (Yorkshire Publishing 2010) and Masters of True Crime (Prometheus Books 2012).

Scott has coached writers, including at the Flathead River Writers Conference in Montana and San Diego State University's Writers' Conference.

Scott taught journalism and advanced magazine writing for five years at the University of Nevada, Las Vegas School of Journalism until September 2005, when she traveled to New Orleans as an embedded reporter for Best Friends Animal Society to cover animal rescues in the aftermath of Hurricane Katrina for its magazine and website. On her return from Louisiana, she hired on with Best Friends as a staff writer. She sat as the Nevada State Sunshine Chair for ten years, until 2007, and on the Society of Professional Journalists Sunshine Committee.

From 2005 through 2007, Scott wrote a column titled "Crime & Punishment" for the alternative weekly Las Vegas CityLife.

Her sixth book, Pawprints of Katrina: Pets Saved and Lessons Learned, with photos by Clay Myers and foreword by actress Ali MacGraw, was a result of Scott's four months on the Gulf Coast writing about the largest rescue of animals in U.S. history. Her seventh book, The Rough Guide to True Crime, a title in the Rough Guides series of books, was released in August 2009 and featured at BookExpo America 2009.

She spoke at the 2008 National Book Festival, sponsored by the Library of Congress and hosted by First Lady Laura Bush, on the National Mall in Washington, D.C. She was a speaker at the 2011 No More Homeless Pets National Conference. and at the 2012 Vegas Valley Book Festival.

In January 2011, Anderson Cooper's 360° blog included Scott in an update on the Tupac and Smalls cases, quoting her as saying that "the failure to secure the actual scene of the shooting and interview witnesses immediately doomed the investigation."

Her work has appeared in The New York Times when she worked as a Times correspondent for 11 years and a stringer for Reuters, as well as in The New York Times Magazine, New York Post, George magazine, Los Angeles Times, The Christian Science Monitor, San Diego Union-Tribune and Las Vegas Sun.

On KTTV's "Good Day L.A." in March 2013, Scott discussed the verdict against chef David Viens in the disappearance of his wife Dawn.

Scott appeared twice on the public-access TV show Connie Martinson Talks Books in January 2003 to talk about the unsolved killing of Susan Berman and her book Murder of a Mafia Daughter and in November 2000 to discuss rapper The Notorious B.I.G. and the book The Murder of Biggie Smalls. She appeared on three Oxygen network "Snapped" segments concerning murder cases involving women and on Unsolved Mysteries about the Tupac Shakur investigation. In 2010 she appeared in the Discovery Channel's documentary, On the Case with Paula Zahn: Death in the Desert, about the Ted Binion trial. On November 7 and 8, 2015, she appeared on a Fox News special about Robert Durst to discuss details about Berman's relationship with Robert Durst covered in Scott's book Murder of a Mafia Daughter.

Las Vegas CityLife newspaper named Scott's 2003 release, Murder of a Mafia Daughter, "Pick of the Week" in February of that year.

In 2011, she wrote the introduction and foreword to military combat photographer Russell Klika's book Iraq: Through the Eyes of an American Soldier.

Her eighth book, The Millionaire's Wife, about the 1990 contract murder of businessman George Kogan, was released by St. Martin's Press True Crime Library in March 2012. The book was launched at Scott's former high school library in April 2012.

In 2013, The Huffington Post reported that Scott was co-writing, with former drug kingpin "Freeway" Rick Ross, his autobiography, released in 2014. The memoir, Freeway Rick Ross: The Untold Autobiography, was launched at the Eso Won Bookstore in Los Angeles on June 17, 2014, to a standing-room-only crowd.

In May 2014, Scott lodged a complaint with YouTube over a re-created image included in rapper Wyclef Jean's music video "April Showers." The controversy arose after Scott reported to YouTube that no attribution had been given, nor was permission sought for use of an autopsy photo released in Scott's book The Killing of Tupac Shakur. YouTube banned the video. TMZ, which broke the story, reported that video director Hezues R' and Scott had settled the matter and agreed upon a screen credit at the end of the video.

Scott is a contributor to Psychology Today, ForbesWoman blog and Women in Crime Ink, described by The Wall Street Journal as "a blog worth reading."

In March 2015, her book Unconditional Honor: Wounded Warriors and Their Dogs, with photos by Clay Myers and foreword by Bill Walton, was released by Globe Pequot Press.

Scott co-authored The Crime Book volume with American crime writers Shanna Hogan, Lee Mellor, Rebecca Morris and British author Michael Kerrigan, with a foreword for the U.S. edition by Scott and the U.K. edition by author Peter James. It was released in April 2017 in the U.K. and May 2017 in the U.S. by Dorling Kindersley (Penguin Random House). In an August 2017 interview with Rolling Stone magazine, Scott explained the choice of stories for the book: "We tried to include the famous ones, and then some lesser-known. They needed to be from across the world and across the years and across a variety of crimes."

Scott appeared in 2018 as a cast member in season 2 of The First 48: Marcia Clark Investigates in an episode titled "The Spreckels Mansion." Clark scrutinized the death of Rebecca Zahau, whose body was discovered outside the mansion of her boyfriend Jonah Shacknai, which Scott blogged about for Forbes.

Author Ann Rule called Scott "a star writer in the crowded field of true crime."

On February 13, 2026, Publishers Marketplace reported that Scott, in a four-book deal, was writing a biography of Ann Rule, titled First Lady of Murder, for publication in spring 2026 by WildBlue Press.

=== Awards and honors ===
- For a year, at age 13, the Scott girls were named by the San Diego County Heart Association as the Heart Fund Twins during its year-long fund drive
- In 1963, then-Mayor Charles Dail awarded Keys to the City of San Diego to the Scott twins at a 1963 ceremony at City Hall after her twin underwent repair of a congenital heart defect, a surgery at the time that was rare.

==== Journalism and Book Awards ====
- Best Political/Governmental Story (1st Place, Beach & Bay Press), San Diego Press Club, 1989
- News Feature (2nd Place, The Vista Press), Society of Professional Journalists, 1991
- Best of Show (The Vista Press), San Diego Press Club, 1992
- Best News Story (1st Place, The Vista Press), San Diego Press Club, 1992
- Feature Story Writing (1st Place, The Vista Press), North San Diego County Press Club, 1992
- Feature Story (2nd Place, The Vista Press), North San Diego County Press Club, 1992
- Best News Story (1st Place, The Vista Press), North San Diego County Press Club, 1992
- Deadline News (2nd Place, The Vista Press), Society of Professional Journalists, 1992
- Spot News (Honorable Mention, The Vista Press), San Diego Press Club, 1992
- Criticism (1st Place, San Diego Union-Tribune), Society of Professional Journalists, 1993
- Best Spot News (2nd Place, Las Vegas Sun), Nevada Press Association, 1996
- Best Spot News Story (3rd Place, Las Vegas CityLife), Nevada Press Association, 2007
- Top 10 Best True Crime Books, True Crime Zine reader's poll, 2012
- ForeWord magazine's 2013 Book of the Year Awards, True Crime (finalist)
- ForeWord magazine's silver award for 2013 Book of the Year in True Crime
- Nominated to the Nevada Writers Hall of Fame, 2014
- ForeWord magazine's 2014 Book of the Year Awards, True Crime (finalist)
- Magazines, Criminal Justice Story (1st Place, Politico), digital magazine, San Diego Press Club, 2023
- Magazines, Criminal Justice (2nd Place, Psychology Today), San Diego Press Club, 2023
- Non-daily Newspapers, Essay/Commentary/Opinion (2nd Place, Julian Home Journal), San Diego Press Club, 2023
- Magazines, Criminal Justice (1st Place, Psychology Today), San Diego Press Club, 2025
- Magazines, Criminal Justice (2nd Place, Psychology Today), San Diego Press Club, 2025

== Filmography ==
=== Film ===
- Death in the Desert (film)

== Bibliography ==
=== Books ===
==== Non-fiction ====
- The Killing of Tupac Shakur (2014, 2002, 1997, Huntington Press) (ISBN 1935396544)
- The Murder of Biggie Smalls (2000, St. Martin's Press) (ISBN 0312266200)
- Death in the Desert: The Ted Binion Homicide Case (2012, 2000) (ISBN 1588205320)
- Seraphim Rose: The True Story and Private Letters (2000, Regina Orthodox Press) (ISBN 1928653014)
- Murder of a Mafia Daughter: The Life and Tragic Death of Susan Berman (2002, Barricade Books) (ISBN 1569802386)
- Pawprints of Katrina: Pets Saved and Lessons Learned (2008) (ISBN 0470228512)
- The Rough Guide to True Crime (2009, Penguin) (ISBN 185828385X)
- The Millionaire's Wife (2012, St. Martin's Press True Crime Library) (ISBN 0312594356)
- Murder in Beverly Hills (2013, AuthorHouse) (ISBN 978-1434305602)
- Freeway Rick Ross: The Untold Autobiography (co-author) (2014, Freeway Studios) (ISBN 978-1499651539)
- Hot Blooded, Cold Crime (2014, Crime Rant Classic) (ASIN B00PEZITHM)
- Unconditional Honor: Wounded Warriors and Their Dogs (2015, Globe Pequot Press) (ISBN 978-1493003297)
- Murder of a Mafia Daughter: The Story Behind Suspicions Robert Durst Murdered Susan Berman (2015 2nd ed, Barricade Books) (ISBN 978-0934878494)
- Murder of a Mafia Daughter: Robert Durst and Susan Berman: The Shocking Inside Story (2022 3rd anniversary ed., Crime, She Writes) (ISBN 978-0578259147)
- The Crime Book (co-authored) (2017, Dorling Kindersley) (ISBN 978-1465462862)
- The Murder of Biggie Smalls (2021 2nd ed., Crime, She Writes) (ISBN 0578249413)
- First Lady of Murder: Ann Rule's Life, Legacy, and the Serial Killer She Called Friend (2026, WildBlue Press) (ISBN 978-1970361278)

==== Anthologies (contributor) ====
- Tupac: A Thug Life (2005, Plexus Publishing) (ISBN 978-0859653756)
- The Big Book of Social Media: Case Studies, Stories, Perspectives (2010, Yorkshire Publishing) (ISBN 978-0881441598)
- Masters of True Crime: Chilling Stories of Murder and the Macabre (2012, Prometheus Books) (ISBN 978-1616145675)
- The Mob: Inside the Brutal World of the Mafia (2017, TIME-LIFE Books)(ISBN 1683308638)

=== Magazines ===
==== Non-fiction ====
- "Dead Poet's Society: Who's Covering Up the Murders of Tupac and Biggie?" (Oct. 1998), George (magazine) Conspiracy Issue

==== Fiction ====
- Crime mystery series (2013, The Social Media Monthly magazine)

== Personal life ==
She was married to Raymond "Ray" Somers, with whom she has a son, Raymond Somers Jr. She lives in Julian, California, a mountain town in San Diego County.
