= The Big Book of Social Media =

2010 compilation of non-fiction articles and chapters edited by Robert Fine

- Author: Robert Fine
- Language: English
- Subject: Internet marketing, business
- Genre: Social media
- Publisher: Yorkshire Publishing
- Publication date: November 2010
- Publication place: United States
- Pages: 312 pp
- ISBN: 978-0-88144-159-8
- OCLC: 2011282372

The Big Book of Social Media: Case Studies, Stories, Perspectives, released in November 2010 by Yorkshire Publishing, is a compilation of non-fiction articles and chapters written by social media experts in their respective fields and edited by Robert Fine, organizer of the Cool Social Conferences World Tour and founder of Cool Blue Press, with a foreword by Sam Feist, political director for CNN.

== Synopsis ==
The publisher, on its site, summed up the book as, "Not business. Not marketing. This is an idea book." And an article in Business Insider described the book as bringing "the social back into social media."

== Contributors ==
Contributing authors include: Alan Rosenblatt, Alane Anderson, Alecia Dantico, Alex Priest, Alfred Naranjo, Becky Carroll, Carri Bugbee, Cathy Scott, Colleen Crinklaw, Constantine Markides, Cordelia Mendoza, Craig Kanalley, Dave Ingland, Eric Andersen, Eric Brown, Gary Zukowski, Haja Rasambainarivo, Jennifer Kaplan, Kari Quaas, Lauri Stevens, Lev Ekster, Mark Stelzner, Matthew Felling, Matt Stewart, Melani Gordon, Michael Bourne, Michele Mattia, Mirna Bard, Neal Schaffer, Nic Evans, Noaf Ereiqat, Pek Pongpaet, Perri Gorman, Phil Baumann, Regina Holliday, Rory Cooper, Sam Feist, Shashi Bellamkonda, Shrinath Navghane, Steve Pratt, Ted Nguyen, Todd Schnick, Tonia Ries, Wayne Burke, as well as Robert Fine.

In December 2011, some of the contributing authors organized "Tweet It Forward," a holiday charity fundraiser, with net proceeds benefitting the Food Bank for New York City.

== Reception ==
Reviewer Mike Brown wrote on the Brainzooming blog that the book goes "beyond the valueless chatter out there; it provides solid discussions of real-life social media strategy implementations that have truly integrated organizational objectives and delivered real metrics."

And Tech Cocktail wrote it in its review, "Through a collection of entertaining anecdotes and insightful marketing agendas, one sees what social media is truly all about and how it is revolutionizing the communications industry."

In 2011, at the SXSW social media festival in Austin, Texas, Fine launched Cool Blue Press and reintroduced The Big Book of Social Media, with plans, he told a reporter from the Washington Examiner, for other new media books and publishing projects, including The Social Media Monthly magazine.

The book was reviewed in 2012 by SAGE Publications for its Journalism and Mass Communication Educator magazine. It is also cited in several books and journals.

=== Awards ===
The book was a winner in the 4th Annual Reader's Choice "Small Business Book Awards" for 2011.

Windmill Networking named it the Top 15 recommended social media books of 2010.
