= Unconditional Honor =

- Author: Cathy Scott
- Language: English
- Genre: Disabled veterans, Service dogs, Dogs
- Publisher: Globe Pequot Press
- Publication date: 2015
- Publication place: United States
- Media type: Print Hardcover, Ebook
- Pages: 288
- ISBN: 978-1-4930-0329-7
- Dewey Decimal: 362.4092/6970973
- LC Class: UB363 .S36 2015

Unconditional Honor: Wounded Warriors and Their Dogs is a 2015 true account of injured military personnel, active and retired, and how service dogs help them acclimate into daily life once they are back on American soil. Authored by American nonfiction and crime writer Cathy Scott with photographs by Clay Myers, a military veteran, and foreword by Bill Walton, a retired NBA star with a service dog, it was released in March 2015 by Globe Pequot Press. The book was launched upon its release at the San Diego Public Library, near the Naval Base Coronado military installation.

== Synopsis ==
More than 200 military personnel from all branches of the service are featured in the book with their stories and photos. The author and photographer traveled across the country to interview veterans and to meet and photograph them with their dogs.

== Awards ==
Named a Foreword Reviews' 2015 INDIEFAB Book of the Year Award Finalist.
