= Pawprints of Katrina =

2008 book by Cathy Scott

- Author: Cathy Scott
- Language: English
- Genre: Non-fiction
- Publisher: Howell Book House
- Publication date: June 2008
- Publication place: United States
- Media type: Hardcover, Kindle
- Pages: 288
- ISBN: 978-0-470-22851-7

Pawprints of Katrina: Pets Saved and Lessons Learned is a non-fiction book written by author and journalist Cathy Scott that documents the author's experience with an animal welfare group and the rescue and reunions of lost animals with their owners in the Gulf region. The book, with a foreword by actor Ali MacGraw, was released in August 2008 on the third anniversary of Hurricane Katrina.

More than 200 stories with photos by Clay Myers detail rescues, examinations, treatment, reunions, and follow-up care by volunteers.

== Summary ==
The book begins on September 11, 2005, at a freeway off-ramp used as a boat launch, with New York City Parks Enforcement (Search & Rescue Team) Department's Captain Scott Shields, known for the efforts of his search-and-rescue dog, Bear, at the World Trade Center on 9/11.

An excerpt from that chapter describes the moment: "Before we set out on a boat to look for stranded pets, the captain asked us to take a moment to remember those lost on 9/11. There, standing amidst the rubble of Hurricane Katrina with the black water just a few feet from us, we bowed our heads, and not a sound was heard. No cars. No lawnmowers. No birds. No planes. No trains. No voices. Not even the couple of dogs rescued and then tied with leashes to the off-ramp railing, awaiting transport, uttered a sound. It was as if, at that brief but somber point in time, they, too, acknowledged the loss of life. It was a poignant moment, observing those lost in the largest terrorist attack on American soil while we were in the thick of rescuing animals in the wake of the biggest natural disaster in U.S. history. The Crescent City was devoid of life, except for those of us out rescuing that day and, of course, the animals left behind."

A story included in the book about Red, a partially paralyzed pit-bull terrier, was covered by CNN's Anderson Cooper. A gray cat whose owner drove 10 hours to reunite with his cat and covered in the book was featured by Dateline NBC.

== Reception ==
Reviewer Steve Donoghue noted, in Open Letters: A Monthly Arts and Literature Review, "...this will certainly be the definitive account of Katrina animal rescue."

The Canada Free Press wrote that "Pawprints of Katrina tells the inspiring story of the fate of the abandoned pets, some ending in tragedy, many in against-all-odds happy endings."

Book Hound's review said, "An experienced rescuer herself, Scott conducted amphibious reporting on the ground and in boats, so her book makes you feel like a firsthand witness to history, as animals are saved and the lucky ones get to be reunited with their people."

Reviewer Justin Moyer with Washington City Paper recommended the book on his Katrina reading list., as did the Chicago Tribune. It was on Sacramento Public Library's "Suggested Reading List" for 2010. And the Tampa Bay Times recommended it for spring reading.

The Times-Picayune columnist Susan Larson reviewed the book, writing, "Scott ends her tale of this 'remarkable collaborative effort' on a note of hope: Katrina raised awareness about how important it is to incorporate caring for animals in disaster planning, and she offers helpful suggestions for pet disaster preparedness."

The author spoke at the 2008 National Book Festival in Washington, D.C., reading from Pawprints of Katrina on the National Mall. She also appeared on KSFR's Santa Fe Radio Cafe in November 2008 while there for a Pawprints book event with MacGraw.

Photographer Myers was awarded "Best Spot News Photo Coverage" from the Nevada Press Association for the book's cover photo included in a first-person account by Scott in Las Vegas CityLife.
