= The Killing of Tupac Shakur =

Biographical book on events that surrounded Tupac Shakur's death

The Killing of Tupac Shakur Third edition
- First edition
- Author: Cathy Scott
- Language: English
- Genre: True crime, Biography
- Publisher: Huntington Press
- Publication date: 1997, 2002, 2014 (3rd ed)
- English publication date: 1997
- Pages: 328 pp
- ISBN: 9781935396543
- OCLC: 37811479
- Dewey Decimal: 364.15/23/09793135
- Preceded by: 1st ed, 2nd ed

The Killing of Tupac Shakur is a biographical, true crime account by American journalist and author Cathy Scott of the 1996 murder of rapper Tupac Shakur. The book made news upon its September 1997 release, on the first anniversary of Shakur's death, because of an autopsy photo included in its pages. It was the first book to be released covering the rapper's death. The book was reprinted in the UK by Plexus Publishing and in Poland by Kagra. Coverage of the autopsy photo, taken of Shakur's body on a gurney in the coroner's examining room, catapulted the book onto the Los Angeles Times bestseller list. New editions of the book were released in 2002 and 2014.

== History ==
Cathy Scott was employed as a reporter at the Las Vegas Sun when Tupac was gunned down on September 7, 1996, in a drive-by shooting near the Las Vegas Strip. She covered the case from the start and turned it into a book. The shooting occurred a few hours after the Mike Tyson-Bruce Seldon match, which Tupac and his music producer, Suge Knight, were in Las Vegas to attend. Tupac died from his injuries six days later, and Scott was the first to report Shakur's death.

The killer has never been caught, although it is widely believed the Crips gang member Orlando Anderson, who was murdered 18 months later, was the shooter. Compton, California, police interviewed Anderson, but he was never charged.

Huntington Press released the book on the first anniversary of Shakur's death by issuing a 25,000-copy first printing, according to Publishers Weekly. The book was number 2 on the Los Angeles Times bestseller list in paperback nonfiction the week of June 11, 2000.

Six months after the murder, Unsolved Mysteries covered the case, following Scott through a reenactment of the crime scene. Las Vegas Metropolitan Police Department declined to be at the studio to field calls and participate when the show aired, saying the publicity would not help their investigation.

People magazine covered the case in 2007 as one of "six haunting mysteries that continue to confound police." The article quotes Scott as saying, "The case is cold. The Crips (street gang) shot Tupac, but who was behind it?"

Upon the book's release, the internal affairs bureau of the Las Vegas Metropolitan Police Department launched an investigation into how the autopsy photo was released to the author. The investigation, which Scott has reported she did not participate in, ended 30 days later with no results. MTV News reported, the week of the book's release, that Tupac is dead, and publicized his "autopsy photo that should end all speculation as to whether the late rapper might still be alive," alluding to rumors that the star rapper and actor had faked his own death. Two years after the murder, Los Angeles Magazine featured a story by writer Heidi Seigmund Cuda focusing on rumors about Tupac "still living large" and described the autopsy photo as a "gruesome shot."

As much as $100,000 was offered for the photo by tabloids. Scott has not revealed her source.

In May 2014, a Wyclef Jean YouTube music video, titled "April Showers", reignited the autopsy photo controversy when Scott lodged a copyright infringement complaint with YouTube because an image in the video was similar to the autopsy photo released in her book. YouTube banned the video. TMZ, which broke the story, reported that the video director, Hezues R', and Scott had settled the matter and agreed that Hezues R' would include a screen credit to the book at the end of the video.

== East Coast-West Coast rap war ==
A second updated edition of The Killing of Tupac Shakur was released in September 2002, which includes a chapter about rapper Biggie Smalls' death, with a third edition released in March 2014. Scott also wrote The Murder of Biggie Smalls, about Notorious B.I.G., who was murdered six months later as an apparent result of a feud between Tupac and Biggie, onetime friends, in what has been called the East Coast – West Coast hip hop rivalry.

== Reception ==
The St. Louis Post-Dispatch featured the book in a November 1997 article, writing: "When Las Vegas Sun crime reporter Cathy Scott got a call to cover a murder in the summer of 1996, she had no idea it would take her on a fast-track trip into the world of rap music, blind witnesses and too many coincidences."

TruTV's "Crime Library" quoted the book as saying that, because of unreleased music potentially worth millions, Shakur "was worth more dead than alive."

Publishers Weekly's writer Judy Quinn wrote that the book with "never-before-seen photos ... "put to rest rumors that Shakur is still alive and in hiding."

True Crime Zine in July 2012 gave the book a five-star review.

== See also ==
- The Murder of Biggie Smalls
- List of murdered hip hop musicians
