= Russell Klika =

American journalist

- Born: 1960 (age 65–66); Appleton, Wisconsin, USA
- Occupations: Photojournalist, combat photographer
- Notable credit: Bronze Star Medal
- Website: http://www.russellklika.com/

Russell Lee Klika (born 1960) is a newspaper and U.S. military combat photographer, photojournalist and trainer who grew up in Appleton, Wisconsin, 100 miles north of Milwaukee.

== Education ==
Klika attended Appleton High School but dropped out in the 10th grade. While in the military on a Western Pacific cruise, he obtained his GED.

In 1988, he graduated from the Eddie Adams Workshop.

== Military career ==
At age 17, Klika joined the U.S. Marine Corps and eventually became a combat photographer and trainer, serving 12 years. Staff Sgt. Klika served three tours of duty in Iraq, the latest in 2006 with the 133rd Mobile Public Affairs Detachment of the Tennessee Army National Guard. and, 2008, one tour of duty in Afghanistan, where United Press International regularly picked up and ran his photos on the wire. He remained deployed on full duty as a combat photographer in Afghanistan until late 2009. His photos from the frontline have been featured on Tennessee's Volunteer State Guard online publication in a column titled "Klika's Korner."

== Photography ==
In late 1980, he left the Marine Corps and became head photographer at The Vista Press, a now-closed daily newspaper in Vista, California, where he covered the 1992 Rodney King riots in Los Angeles, California. While at The Vista Press, in 1992 he was awarded Best of Show photo in the San Diego Press Club's annual county-wide journalism contest. He left the newspaper in 1992 to go to work for the Escondido Times Advocate while also freelancing for the Los Angeles Times.

Iraq: From the Eyes of an American Soldier, Book Cover

In 2004, he joined the 278th Regimental Combat Team Tennessee Army National guard as a noncommissioned officer as head of public affairs, deploying with the unit for a tour in Iraq. After he returned, he became an operation warrior trainer for the first army and a combat photography trainer in public affairs at Camp Atterbury in Edinburgh, Indiana. When his service ended in February 2008, Klika became a contract employee for the National Guard in Smyma, Tennessee, where he currently supervises civilian photographers assigned to the National Guard.

== Awards and appearances ==
In April 2007, Klika won first place in the Military Photographer of the Year contest for his portrait of an Iraqi child. In February 2008, 40 of his Iraq photos were displayed at Slippery Rock University in Pennsylvania. In May 2008, Klika was awarded an honorable mention in the Art of Photography Show for a photo titled "Faces of Iraq," on display at the Lyceum Theatre Gallery in downtown San Diego. In February 2008, he had two one-man shows and gave lectures at Point Park University and Slippery Rock University In May 2007, his photos of soldiers saving a dog along the Syrian-Iraqi border were featured on an animal rescue news site.

Then, in late May 2008, his photos appeared with eight other combat photographers' in the "Eye of the Storm" gallery showing in West Hollywood, California.

In June 2009, he was awarded the Bronze Star from the Army's Special Forces after going with his unit on more than 60 combat missions in Afghanistan and documenting the operations with photo images.

Klika's photography work in Iraq is depicted in his book Iraq: Through the Eyes of an American Soldier, with an introduction and foreword by author Cathy Scott.
