= Tupac: A Thug Life =

Anthology and collection of writings about Tupac Shakur

- Book cover
- Author: Sam Brown, et al
- Language: English
- Genre: Music, biography
- Publisher: Plexus Publishing
- Publication date: 19 December 2005
- Publication place: UK
- Pages: 208 pp (paperback ed)
- ISBN: 978-0859653756

Tupac: A Thug Life is an anthology and collection of writings on the rapper Tupac Shakur released in 2005 by Plexus Publishing in the UK. The book was edited by Sam Brown with a foreword by music journalist Kris Ex. The title was taken from a quote by Shakur, who once said, "I didn't choose the thug life; the thug life chose me."

== Storyline ==
The book is divided into five sections to illustrate the rap artist's troubled childhood living in housing projects in Oakland, California and his relationship with his mother Afeni Shakur, his recording and film career, his unsolved 1996 murder and conspiracy surrounding it, and his legacy and posthumous releases. It includes reviews for Shakur's film roles as well as a selection of photos.

The publisher described the book as "the definitive story of Tupac's career in a thorough selection of interviews, articles, reviews and essays on rap music's enduring icon."

Writings from contributors include interviews with Shakur's music producer Suge Knight, rapper Snoop Dogg, actor Tim Roth, and Tupac's mother Afeni Shakur, with a chapter by crime writer Cathy Scott.

== Reception ==
The Library Journal included the anthology in its 22 January 2008 "First Look at New Books" column for "readers looking for more in-depth biographical information" about the late rapper.

The hip-hop news site ThugLifeArmy.com wrote that "every aspect of Tupac's condensed life and career is explored in a new book entitled Tupac: A Thug Life."

Rap News Network wrote, "Through interviews, articles, reviews, dozens of photos, and essays, Sam Brown the editor looks into the life of the late rap icon."
