= The Murder of Biggie Smalls =

Non-fiction book by Cathy Scott

- 2nd Edition
- Author: Cathy Scott
- Language: English
- Genre: True crime, Biography
- Publisher: St. Martin's Press
- Publication date: May 18, 2021 (2nd ed); October 11, 2000 (1st ed)
- Publication place: United States
- Media type: Print (trade-size paperback and hardcover), Audible Audio Edition, Amazon Kindle eBook
- Pages: 210
- ISBN: 978-0-312-26620-2
- Preceded by: The Killing of Tupac Shakur
- Followed by: Death in the Desert

The Murder of Biggie Smalls is a non-fiction true crime book by author and journalist Cathy Scott. Published in October 2000 by St. Martin's Press, it covers the March 9, 1997 murder of the Notorious B.I.G. in a drive-by shooting. A second updated edition of the book was released in September 2021.

== Background ==
The book includes a chapter about accusations from fellow rapper Tupac Shakur, that Biggie, 24, and his producer, Sean "Diddy" Combs, were responsible for Tupac being injured during a 1994 shooting at New York City's Quad Studios, where Biggie was recording that same night. Smalls denied the accusation, as did Combs, and no arrests were ever made in the case. In September 1996, Shakur, 25, was shot a second time, this time in Las Vegas. Shakur died six days later. That murder, too, remains unsolved, which Scott covered in The Killing of Tupac Shakur.

In what was promoted as a Sunday series with "exclusive information" in the Los Angeles Times, the article quoted a single source saying Biggie Smalls had been in Las Vegas the night Shakur was murdered and that Smalls had paid for and ordered the hit against Shakur. When Voletta Wallace, Smalls' mother, gave proof to the Times that her son had, in fact, been in a New York studio recording music the night Shakur was shot, the newspaper retracted the story and ultimately removed it from its website. Scott commented on the article in a Las Vegas CityLife column. "Wallace was a rapper, not a killer," she wrote. "He was an only child who attended private Catholic school and was raised by an over-protective single mom. While Wallace spewed violence in his songs, he wasn't a street thug like Shakur."

People magazine interviewed Scott about the claim, quoting her as saying, "It's easy to point a finger at a dead guy. The dead can't sue." TruTV's "Crime Library" quoted one possible scenario from the book that Combs could have been responsible for Smalls' death because "dead stars sell records without the bothersome upkeep."

An earlier article in the L.A. Times, which accused Tupac's music producer, Suge Knight, and a rogue Los Angeles Police Department officer as also being involved in Smalls' murder, the informant for the article recanted his claims and described himself to the Times as "a paranoid schizophrenic."

Based upon the newspaper's earlier accusations against her son, Voletta Wallace filed suit against the City of Los Angeles and the LAPD in a wrongful death suit accusing police of taking part in a conspiracy to kill her son. She lost the suit when, in April 2010, a judge dismissed the claim. The civil suit, along with LAPD's internal investigation, are included in The Murder of Biggie Smalls.

In January 2011, Anderson Cooper AC360 reported that a new task force, composed of law enforcement officers based in the Los Angeles area, was taking a fresh look at the Smalls murder case, interviewing author Scott for AC360's blog about the probe that is said to also be looking into Shakur's murder.

The book was optioned in 2000 for a feature film, Record Wars, by Jonathan Sheinberg's development and production company The Machine.

== Reception ==
According to Booklist magazine's Mike Tribby in his October 2000 review, "Whereas others who have dealt with this stuff have often neglected to humanize the principals involved, Scott points up biographical details that bring them into focus as human beings. For setting the record straight as well as for limning a major pop music star, this is a valuable book."

It made the New York Times best seller nonfiction hardcover list the week of October 15, 2000.

The editors at Barnes & Noble wrote that "the fatal shooting of rapper Notorious B.I.G. remains shrouded in a blanket of mystery, speculation, and grief, while his popularity is as strong as ever. Cathy Scott's The Murder of Biggie Smalls is an engrossing examination of the death of the beloved Big Poppa and the resulting investigation, which finally seems to be nearing a conclusion."

Kirkus Reviews described the book as, "A thorough report on the investigation of the drive-by shooting of one of rap music's top stars. ... A compelling tale that ... reveals an exotic world based in greed, violence, and the need for self-expression."

Nelson George with Africana-Magazine also reviewed the book, noting, "The picture painted of the investigation of Biggie's murder is more detailed than anything found in the music press. In 2000, The Murder of Biggie Smalls made Library Booklist's "Realistic and Urban Fiction" for teens.

The New York Post ran an excerpt upon the book's 2000 release.

== Book editions ==
1st edition

- The Murder of Biggie Smalls, a biography covering the life and death of the late rapper, was released by St. Martin's Press in October 2000.
- The Murder of Biggie Smalls was reprinted in the UK by Plexus Publishing, a music genre publisher. It has also been made into a talking book, read by narrator Bob Moore.
- A second edition of The Murder of Biggie Smalls 2nd Edition was released by Crime, She Writes in October 2022.

== See also ==
- The Killing of Tupac Shakur
- List of murdered hip hop musicians
