= National Mill Dog Rescue =

Non-profit animal welfare organization

- Abbreviation: NMDR
- Established: February 2007; 19 years ago
- Founder: Theresa Strader
- Tax ID no.: 26-0574783
- Website: nmdr.org

National Mill Dog Rescue (NMDR) is a non-profit organization based in Peyton, Colorado. It was established by Theresa Strader in February 2007, and legally incorporated on July 23, 2007. According to the organization's website, it aims to "rescue, rehabilitate and rehome discarded breeding dogs and to educate the general public about the cruel realities of the commercial dog breeding industry".

== Founding ==
In February 2007, founder Teresa Strader heard that a large-scale commercial breeder, or puppy mill, was going out of business and a massive dog auction would take place in Missouri. She attended the auction and was left speechless at the mistreatment of the dogs. She adopted 13 of the 561 dogs up for auction, including an Italian Greyhound named Lily. She soon established National Mill Dog Rescue in honor of Lily. National Mill Dog Rescue was legally incorporated on July 23, 2007. Lily died on May 13, 2008, at the age of 8.

== Accomplishments ==
On March 3, 2019, the organization said they had rescued over 13,000 dogs. On September 27, 2019, the organization said they had provided exemplary care for more than 14,400 dogs over the previous 12 years. They have an 11,000 square foot kennel, a 6,000 square foot medical/rehabilitation facility, and a foster program, which when combined allows them to care for about 130 large and small dogs. As of September 27, 2019, they had 33 full and part-time staff and 700 volunteers.

In 2013, Theresa Strader was given the ASPCA's Henry Bergh Award for her work with NMDR.

== Controversy ==
In March 2017, NMDR was cited by the Pet Animal Care Facilities Act agency for failing to comply with nine different state regulations. Violations included housing male and female dogs together, having kennels with rusty and sharp panels that could hurt a dog, and transferring 62 dogs from Kansas to Colorado without obtaining the required certificates of veterinary inspection (CVIs). In early 2019, NMDR's former marketing director Jene Nelson filed complaints with two state agencies, alleging that NMDR had trafficked dogs across state lines without required veterinary paperwork, falsified rabies certificates before offering dogs for adoption or transferring them to other shelters, and delayed or failed to provide needed veterinary treatment multiple times. Theresa Strader was sent a cease-and-desist letter on June 28, 2019, which said the State Board of Veterinary Medicine had credible evidence that Strader had interpreted test results, administered vaccinations, performed exams, and diagnosed animals, all without the proper license. The board also launched their own investigation.

On July 14, 2019, an article detailing questionable practices used by NMDR was published on the Huffington Post news website. Among other things, the article said that despite claiming to fight commercial dog breeding, NMDR often works hand-in-hand with breeders. After the article's publication, Strader published a post on NMDR's Facebook page, which denied multiple claims the article made.

On August 8, 2019, NMDR was fined $15,000 by the Pet Animal Care Facilities Act agency. The order cited 15 regulatory violations including importing dogs without the required vaccinations and paperwork, failing to produce medical records, failing to produce a complete origin record for one dog, and transporting dogs and cats without a license. The order also said that two dogs named Oscar and Jubilee were severely injured in dogfights at the facility. According to the order, NMDR admitted that there is a factual basis for disciplinary proceedings, and waived its rights to any hearing or appeal. According to the agency's manager, Nick Fisher, Nelson's allegations of wrongdoing were correct, and pretty much all of her allegations were founded in their investigation.
