= Clay Myers (photographer) =

American photographer and activist

- Born: Kokomo, Indiana
- Known for: Photography
- Notable work: "Lead by Example" poster "Captured Moments" exhibit
- Movement: Animal welfare, nature
- Awards: Best Spot News Photo Coverage; Nevada Press Association

Clay Myers (born in Kokomo, Indiana) is an American photographer, videographer and animal welfare advocate best known for his portraits of rescued companion animals.

== Education ==
Myers graduated from Haverford High School in Havertown, Pennsylvania, in 1976. He served four years in the United States Marine Corps, from 1977 to 1981, as a grade E-4. He received a mechanics license from Quaker City School of Aeronautics in 1985.

== Career ==
Myers, a photographer for 20 years, began his photo career by shooting for photo stock agencies.

From 2002 to 2007, he was the lead photographer and photo manager for Best Friends Animal Society and a photographer until 2011. He presented a workshop at the 2005 annual No More Homeless Pets Conference.

Beginning in 2008, he volunteered for National Mill Dog Rescue and was the still photographer for the group's 2010 documentary I Breathe.

His photos have appeared in newspapers and magazines, including the San Francisco Chronicle, the Los Angeles Times, Vanity Fair, The New York Times, Outdoor Photographer, New Jersey Magazine, and the St. Louis Post-Dispatch. In 2008, an article about National Mill Dog Rescue founder Theresa Strader that included Myers' photos ran on the front page of the Colorado Springs Independent.

Myers' photos were used by the New Jersey Department of Environmental Protection in its Conserve Wildlife newsletters.

In May 2008, Myers began a photo assignment for a PetSmart Charities' program to help save lives by transporting homeless dogs from high pet population areas to shelters where dogs were in demand. The program was featured in Parade magazine.

=== ADOPT poster ===
Los Angeles street artist Shepard Fairey used Myers' photo of a rescued shaggy dog named Sylvie (owned by dog trainer Ann Allums) and made it a screen print similar to the "Hope" poster Fairey did of Barack Obama during the 2008 U.S. presidential election. For the ADOPT poster, released in January 2009, Fairey created a mutt version of the red, white and blue screen print. Four hundred copies were offered by Adopt-a-Pet.com. Fairey explained why he turned the photo into a poster, then donated it with Myers' permission for free downloading: “Homeless pets urgently need us to take the lead and speak out on their behalf, now more than ever. ... It is my hope that this new print will give people a way to advocate for these animals and show their support for pet adoption."

The poster, available for download at no cost, ran on the cover of Dog's Life magazine in spring 2009. In September 2009, Fairey released the poster in gold and black. The prints were covered in September 2009 on Martha Stewart's blog, The Daily Wag.

=== Gallery exhibit ===
Myers' work, titled "Captured Moments," was included in a May 2005 gallery exhibit at the Russell Senate Office Building in Washington, D.C., along with paintings by artist Cyrus Mejia. The newspaper Roll Call covered the event.

=== Books ===
In 2005, he was deployed three times by Best Friends to cover the rescue of animals in the Gulf region in the aftermath of Hurricane Katrina. Afterward, more than 70 of his photos were featured in the book Pawprints of Katrina by Cathy Scott. His photos illustrated the 1998 book New Jersey Wildlife Viewing Guide by Laurie Pettigrew.

Myers was awarded "Best Spot News Photo Coverage" in 2006 from the Nevada Press Association for the book's cover photo, which also illustrated an article in Las Vegas CityLife.

In November 2008, Myers and Scott joined actress and animal advocate Ali MacGraw, who wrote the book's foreword, for a book signing at Garcia Street Books in Santa Fe, New Mexico, where MacGraw lives.

The Times-Picayune, in a June 2008 review of Pawprints of Katrina, wrote that "Clay Myers' color photos provide an up-close and personal view of the animals, and their rescuers and families."

Myers took photos for the book Unconditional Honor: Wounded Warriors and their Dogs by Cathy Scott, with a foreword by former NBA star Bill Walton, who has a service dog. It was released by Globe Pequot Press in March 2015.

== Personal life ==
He lives in Oregon with his wife, Cathie.
