= R. Barri Flowers =

American novelist

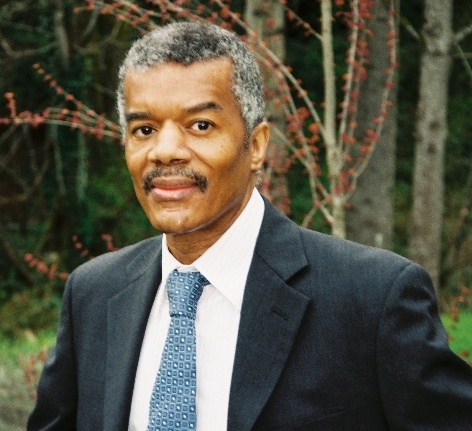
- R. Barri Flowers
- Born: Ronald Barri Flowers; October 25, 1956 (age 69); Detroit, Michigan, U.S.
- Education: Mumford High School; Michigan State University (BA, MS)
- Occupation: Writer
- Writing career
- Period: 1980–present
- Genres: True crime, Teen and adult non-fiction
- Subjects: Criminology, Thrillers, Romance
- Notable works: Justice Served; Masters of True Crime
- Website: www.rbarriflowers.com

Ronald Barri Flowers (born October 25, 1956) is an American writer of mystery novels and non-fiction books, as well as a criminologist. He lives in Honolulu, Hawaii.

== Early life and education ==
Flowers was born the second of five children in Michigan. He attended Mumford High School on the northwest side of Detroit. He graduated from Michigan State University with a Bachelor of Arts degree in 1977 and a masters of science in 1980, both in criminal justice. In 2006, he was inducted into the MSU Criminal Justice Wall of Fame.

== Career ==
In 2004, after previously writing non-fiction books and short stories, Flowers wrote his first legal thriller, Persuasive Evidence.

He has written 12 romance novels under the pseudonym "Devon Vaughn Archer" and was the first male author for Harlequin's Arabesque imprint. Midwest Book Review described Kissing the Girl Next Door, a title in the series, as romance that "flows off the page."

Flowers' short story, "The Wrong End of A Gun Barrel," was included in author Curt Colbert's Seattle Noir. It was released in spring 2009 as a part of Akashic Books' noir series.

He has edited two mystery and one true-crime anthology, including Masters of True Crime, released by Prometheus Books in July 2012. He also writes short stories and collections.

He appeared on Investigation Discovery's "Wicked Attraction" series in an episode titled "Twisted Twosome." Flowers also appeared in A&E's 2008 Biography Channel crime series episode "The Love Slave Murders" about the Gerald and Charlene Gallego case depicted in his true crime book The Sex Slave Murders, an excerpt of which was printed in the February 1997 issue of Cosmopolitan magazine. It was also included in Suspense Magazine's Best of 2011 books.

Flowers was profiled in a Q&A article on Yahoo! Voices in May 2012.

== Awards ==
His 2005 book, Justice Served, was nominated for a Romantic Times Award.

== Books ==
=== True crime ===
- The Sex Slave Murders (1996, 2012) (ISBN 978-1461191001)
- Murders in the United States (Sept 2004) (ISBN 978-0786420759)
- Mass Murder in the Sky (Feb 2012) (eBook edition)
- Serial Killer Couples (April 2012) (ISBN 978-1475200072)
- The Pickaxe Slave Killers (April 2013) (ISBN 9781301333806)
- Murder at the Pencil Factory (May 2013) (ISBN 9781301379514)
- The Sex Slave Murders 2 (July 2013) (ISBN 9781301508372)
- Dead at the Saddleworth Moor (July 2013) (ISBN 9781301114870)
- Killers of the Lonely Hearts (Aug 2013) (ISBN 9781301424313)
- Murder of a Star Quarterback (Sept 2013) (ISBN 9781301174218)
- Murder Chronicles (November 2014) (ISBN 978-1503391024)

=== Criminology ===
- Children and Criminality (Nov 1986) (ISBN 978-0313251245)
- Women and Criminality (June 1987) (ISBN 978-0313253652)
- Demographics and Criminality (Dec 1989) (ISBN 978-0313253676)
- Minorities and Criminality (Feb 1990) (ISBN 978-0275936044)
- Criminal Jurisdiction Allocation in Indian Country (Feb 1990) (ISBN 978-0275936044)
- The Victimization and Exploitation of Women and Children (Oct 1994) (ISBN 978-0899509785)
- Domestic Crimes, Family Violence and Child Abuse (July 2000) (ISBN 978-0786408238)
- Runaway Kids and Teenage Prostitution (June 2001) (ISBN 978-0275973421)
- Kids Who Commit Adult Crimes (July 2002) (ISBN 978-0789011305)
- Murder, at the End of the Day and Night (Aug 2002) (ISBN 978-0398073077)
- The Prostitution of Women and Girls (Aug 2005) (ISBN 978-0786424481)
- Sex Crimes (Oct 2006) (ISBN 978-0398076788)
- Female Crimes, Criminals and Cellmates (Dec 2008) (ISBN 978-0786440535)
- Drugs, Alcohol and Criminality in American Society (Feb 2008) (ISBN 978-0786438693)
- The Adolescent Criminal (Dec 2008) (ISBN 978-0786440542)
- College Crime (Oct 2009) (ISBN 978-0786440344)
- Street Kids (April 2010) (ISBN 978-0786441372)
- Prostitution in the Digital Age (April 2011) (ISBN 978-0313384608)
- The Dynamics of Murder (Nov 2012) (ISBN 978-1439879733)

=== Thrillers ===
- Persuasive Evidence (Oct 2004) (ISBN 978-0843954692)
- Justice Served (Aug 2005) (ISBN 978-0843955620)
- State's Evidence (Apr 2006) (ISBN 978-0843955712)
- Dead in the Rose City (Nov 2010) (ISBN 978-1456406509)
- Dark Streets of Whitechapel (Feb 2012) (e-book and audio releases)
- Murder in Maui: A Leila Kahana Mystery (April 2012) (ISBN 978-1475202847)
- Murder in Honolulu: A Skye Delaney Mystery (June 2012) (ISBN 978-1477634783)
- Killer in the Woods (July 2012) (e-book edition)
- Seduced to Kill in Kauai (Nov 2012) (ISBN 978-1475202847)
- Before He Kills Again (April 2013) (ISBN 9781301454785)
- Fractured Trust (Mar 2014) (ISBN 9781310325045)

=== Young adult fiction ===
- Ghost Girl in Shadow Bay (Jan 2011) (ISBN 978-1456500887)
- Danger in Time (Jan 2011) (ISBN 978-1456593070)
- Christmas Wishes: Laura's Story (Nov 2012) (ISBN 978-1480296213)
- Count Dracula's Teenage Daughter (Dec 2012) (ISBN 978-1481264792)
- Teen Ghost at Dead Lake (Sept 2013) (ISBN 9781301174812)
- Out for Blood (Nov 2013) (ISBN 978-1310335099)

=== Young adult fiction (under pseudonym) ===
- Her Teen Dream (Nov 2011) (ISBN 978-1475199543)
- Her Teen Dream: Summer Heartbreak (April 2012) (ISBN 978-1475199543)
- His Teen Dream (Oct 2012) (ISBN 978-1-4657-9287-7)

=== Romance novels ===
- Forever Sweethearts (Nov 2012) (e-book edition)

==== Under pseudonym ====
- Love Once Again (2006) (ISBN 978-1583146798)
- Christmas Heat (2007) (ISBN 978-0373860470)
- Destined to Meet (2008) (ISBN 978-0373860715)
- Kissing the Man Next Door (2009) (ISBN 978-0373861156)
- The Secrets of Paradise Bay (2010) (ISBN 978-1601622198)
- The Hitman's Woman (2011) (ISBN 978-1601624628)
- Private Luau (2011) (ISBN 978-0373862399)
- Pleasure in Hawaii (2011) (ISBN 978-0373862153)
- Aloha Fantasy (April 2012) (ISBN 978-0373862597)
- Danger at Every Turn (2012) (ISBN 978-1601623423)
- Love is in The Air (2013) (ISBN 978-0373862955)
- Say It With Roses (2013) (ISBN 978-0373863006)
- Bet on Love (Jan 2014) (ISBN 978-0373863402)

=== Anthologies ===
- Murder Past, Murder Present (Sept 2009) (ISBN 978-1606192061)
- Murder Here, Murder There (May 2012) (ISBN 978-1606192412)
- Masters of True Crime (July 2012) (ISBN 978-1616145675)
