= Donald E. McQuinn =

American novelist

- Education: University of Washington
- Occupation: US Marine
- Writing career
- Language: English
- Notable works: Targets; Warrior; The Prisoner Within

Donald E. McQuinn (born 1930 in Winthrop, Massachusetts) is an American best-selling author, and former U.S. Marine.

McQuinn graduated from high school in Texas, and attended the University of Washington on a Navy scholarship. He served 20 years in the Marines, retiring in 1971 as a major, before becoming an author.

In September 1998 he suffered a sudden cardiac arrest while on vacation in Hawaii and became the first person saved by the police department's recent deployment of automated external defibrillators.

A third book in the Captain Lannat series was announced by the publisher as "a work in progress", but remains unfinished or unpublished.

== Bibliography ==
- Targets (set during the Vietnam War), 1980, ISBN 0-02-583710-9
- Wake in Darkness (set in the Philippines), 1981, ISBN 0-02-583730-3
- Shadow of Lies (contemporary spy novel), July 1985, ISBN 0-312-93726-1
- Moondark Saga post-apocalyptic trilogy (published in nine parts in Germany)
  1. Warrior (November 1990), ISBN 0-345-36504-6
  2. Wanderer (November 1993), ISBN 0-345-37840-7
  3. Witch (November 1994), ISBN 0-345-37841-5
- Captain Lannat science fiction series
  1. With Full Honors (November 1996), ISBN 0-345-40045-3
  2. The Prisoner Within (December 1997), ISBN 0-345-40044-5
