= Death in the Desert =

2000 book by Cathy Scott

- Death in the Desert cover
- Author: Cathy Scott
- Language: English
- Genre: True crime, biography
- Publisher: AuthorHouse
- Publication date: 2012 (first edition published 2000)
- Publication place: United States
- Media type: Print (Paperback)
- Pages: 322 pp
- ISBN: 978-1588205322 (2nd edition, paperback)

Death in the Desert: The Ted Binion Homicide Case is a 2000 biographical and crime account by the American journalist and crime author Cathy Scott, with a second edition in 2012. The book, which was the first of four released about the case, details the homicide investigation and ensuing trial and re-trial of Ted Binion’s live-in girlfriend Sandy Murphy and her lover Rick Tabish in connection with Binion's death.

== Storyline ==
The book is an in-depth look at the life and death of Lonnie Theodore "Ted" Binion, the 54-year-old heir to Binion's Horseshoe Casino, who died from a drug overdose on September 17, 1998. The book seeks to resolve whether Binion was murdered by Murphy and Tabish or accidentally overdosed on drugs he had purchased in the days before his death. It includes historical photos of the Binion family from the archives of the Las Vegas News Bureau and University of Nevada, Las Vegas's Lied Library "Special Collections."

The murder motive, the prosecution contended, was Binion's $50 million estate. In his will, he left Murphy $300,000 cash in addition to his $900,000 house and its contents, which included original paintings and a silver coin collection kept in a safe inside the house.

The author interviewed the defendants before and after the first trial and re-trial, which was dubbed Las Vegas's "trial of the century."

== Film adaptation ==
Death in the Desert, a full-length film that completed shooting in Las Vegas in February 2014, is based on the book of the same title with the script by screenwriter John Steppling. Directed and produced by Josh Evans, it stars Michael Madsen as Ted Binion (played as Ray), Shayla Beesley as Sandy Murphy (played as Kim) and Paz de la Huerta as Kim's friend Margo, with a musical score by record producer Chris Goss and performed by singer Roxy Saint. The film premiered at the Tucson Film Festival on October 9, 2015. Distribution was scheduled for 2016 by Osiris Entertainment.

== Popular culture ==
In 2012, author R. Barri Flowers chose the chapter "Fat Herbie Blitzstein" from Death in the Desert for inclusion in the anthology Masters of True Crime released by Prometheus Books in July 2012.

Investigation Discovery's series On the Case with Paula Zahn covered the case in 2009, interviewed the author, and gave the episode the same title as the book.

In 2006, Scott appeared on Oxygen Network’s "Snapped" series "Women Who Kill" about defendant Murphy, which was the show's fourth season debut episode.

In October 2004, Steve Bornfeld with the Las Vegas Sun wrote a musical spoof about the Binion case and included Scott as one of the play's three narrators.

== Critical reception ==
The book was reviewed by the Nevada Historical Society Quarterly in fall 2002.

In February 2001, the Las Vegas Mercury called the book "lively and informative." AmericanMafia.com in 2003 described Death in the Desert as "objective and not favoring either the prosecution or the defense."

The book is on display at University of Nevada, Las Vegas's Lied Library Special Collections.

True Crime Zine, which gave the second edition of the book a five-star review in January 2013, wrote, "Even if you’ve seen the television episodes on the case, you still want to read Death In The Desert because it’s a rollercoaster of a read. ... Just when you think it ends, it doesn’t. There’s so much more and a surprise ending."
