= Roxy Saint =

American singer (born 1977)

- Born: Roxanne Saint; November 5, 1977 (age 48); Los Angeles, California, U.S.
- Genres: Hard rock; punk rock; gothic; alternative rock
- Occupations: Musician, songwriter, singer, producer, director, fashion designer, actress
- Instruments: Guitar; vocals; percussion

Roxanne Saint (born November 5, 1977), known professionally as Roxy Saint, is an American singer, musician, video producer, director, and actress who started singing at age 17. She's known for her role in the film Zombie Strippers and as the lead performer in the goth band Roxy Saint and the Blackouts.

== Early life ==
Roxanne Saint was born on November 5, 1977, in Los Angeles, California. An only child whose father died when she was two, Saint was raised in Southern California by her mother.

== Career ==
In the early 1990s, she was the vocalist for Hollywood band Never on Sunday. She went solo, and in 1995 released the CD Orphan Child, which contained rerecorded songs from her previous band. Her debut DVD release, however, which Saint directed and produced, was The Underground Personality Tapes in 2003. She toured in England, including performing at the Leeds and Reading festivals. Blog Critics called Saint "the next huge thing" and "PJ Harvey crossed with Sofia Coppola."

She has released her music, which include videos, as an indie producer, via DVDs, the Internet and digital downloads. Saint contributed to the rock band Die Trying's self-named album with guest vocals on the single "Dirty, Dirty".

She performed a song for the 1999 movie The Criminal, starring Steven Mackintosh, and a song for the 2002 film The Hot Chick, starring actor Rob Schneider.

KNAC radio's Mick Stingley, in a CD/DVD review of The Underground Personality Tapes, wrote that Saint was "New Wave retro cool, LA glammo sleaze-rock, with Boss Super Over-Drive distortion pedal to the floor" who "has something to offer." And in a 2004 interview, In Music We Trust Magazine described Saint's brand of music as "defying convention and going against logic."

Also in 2004, Saint, who's known for shopping for her clothes at thrift stores, launched her own clothing line titled Trash Couture with her dresses numbered and individually named ("Chaos," "Aquarius" and "Glitch"). MK Magazine described the line as "one-of-a-kind dresses made from black plastic trash bags."

The San Francisco Weekly wrote that during her 2005 European tour, Saint's belongings were stolen, which the paper said, "may have been the best thing that ever happened to her. ... Her slashed, duct-taped, hand-painted 'Trash Couture' creations were such a hit that she now sells them online."

=== Films ===
She co-starred, playing the role of Lillith, in the 2008 film Zombie Strippers, written and directed by Jay Lee.

In 2014, filming completed in Las Vegas for Death In The Desert, a full-length movie in which Saint plays the character Corey and performs an original song by record producer Chris Goss. Saint, an executive producer on the film, which is directed and produced by her husband, Evans, stars Michael Madsen, Shayla Beesley and Paz de la Huerta.

== Personal life ==
She has one son, with husband Josh Evans born in December 2017. She is the daughter-in-law of actress Ali Macgraw.
