= Trying =

Trying may refer to:

- Trying (play), by Joanna Glass
- "Trying" (The Hilltoppers song)
- Trying (Midwxst song), 2020
- Trying (TV series), a 2020 comedy on Apple TV+
- "Trying" (Brooklyn Nine-Nine), an episode of Brooklyn Nine-Nine

== See also ==
- Attempt
- Die Trying (disambiguation)
- Effort (disambiguation)
- Try (disambiguation)
