= Cheryl Tiegs =

American model (born 1947)

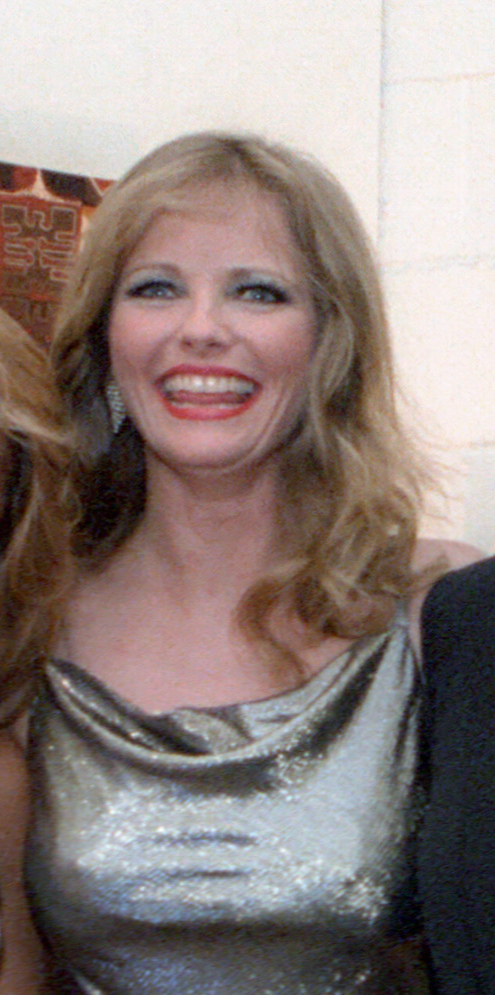
- Tiegs on May 20, 1983
- Born: Cheryl Rae Tiegs; September 25, 1947 (age 79); Breckenridge, Minnesota, U.S.
- Occupations: Model, fashion designer
- Years active: 1964–present
- Spouses: Stan Dragoti (m. 1970; div. 1979); Peter Beard (m. 1981; div. 1983); Anthony Peck (m. 1990; div. 1995); Rod Stryker (m. 1998; div. 2001)
- Children: 3

Cheryl Rae Tiegs (born September 25, 1947) is an American model and fashion designer. Frequently described as America's first supermodel, Tiegs made multiple appearances on the covers of the Sports Illustrated Swimsuit Issue and Time magazine.

Her 1978 "Pink Bikini" poster became an iconic image of 1970s pop culture.

== Early life ==
Tiegs was born in Breckenridge, Minnesota, to Phyllis and Theodore Tiegs, an auto-assembly lineman turned funeral director. She and her family moved to Alhambra, California, in 1952. She is of German descent. Tiegs was encouraged to start modeling by a friend. Regarding the start of her career, Tiegs stated,

I started very slowly. I worked part-time in high school and college. I would do anything and everything. I would do fashion shows in the back parking lot of a department store for free. I would work for $5 an hour, which was great money for me at the time. I was thrilled. I just worked hard, and I did anything and everything I could.

As a senior at Alhambra High School, Tiegs posed for a swimsuit ad for bathing suit manufacturer Cole of California; the ad, which appeared in Seventeen, launched her career as a model. Although she enrolled as an English major at California State University, Los Angeles, she left college before her junior year in order to pursue her career.

== Career ==
Tiegs's break as a model came when she was 17, after the editorial staff at Glamour saw the Cole bathing suit ad. Bypassing the traditional in-person meeting, Tiegs was booked on a shoot in Saint Thomas with Ali MacGraw, which resulted in her first Glamour cover. Later that same year, Tiegs made the covers of Seventeen and Elle. She subsequently appeared on the covers of Vogue and Harper's Bazaar, among others.

Tiegs was the first model to appear twice on the cover of the Sports Illustrated Swimsuit Issue, but she significantly raised her profile in 1978, when she posed in a fishnet swimsuit. Tiegs additionally made the cover of People four times, and did three covers for Time, most notably for the "All-American Model" cover story in 1978. A year later, she was signed to a reported $1.5 million two-year contract with Cover Girl cosmetics, then the biggest contract ever. In 2004, Tiegs was inducted into the Sports Illustrated Swimsuit Issue's 40th anniversary "Hall of Fame", and was included on People's 2008 50 Most Beautiful People list, and Men's Health magazine's 2012 "100 Hottest Women of All Time" feature. Tiegs posed in 2001 in a bikini for the cover of More, and earned considerable praise for breaking age barriers related to fitness, fashion, and beauty.

Tiegs met photographer Peter Beard in New York in 1978. In 1979, she traveled to Kenya with him on a photographic expedition to investigate the management and widespread destruction of African wildlife; their journey was documented in an Emmy-winning episode of ABC's The American Sportsman titled "Africa: End of the Game". Tiegs and Beard were married in 1981; between 1978 and 1982 she traveled back and forth between the US and Hog Ranch in Kenya. In 1979, Look magazine ran a cover story titled "Cheryl Tiegs: The New African Queen". She was also featured on the cover of Outside in 1980.

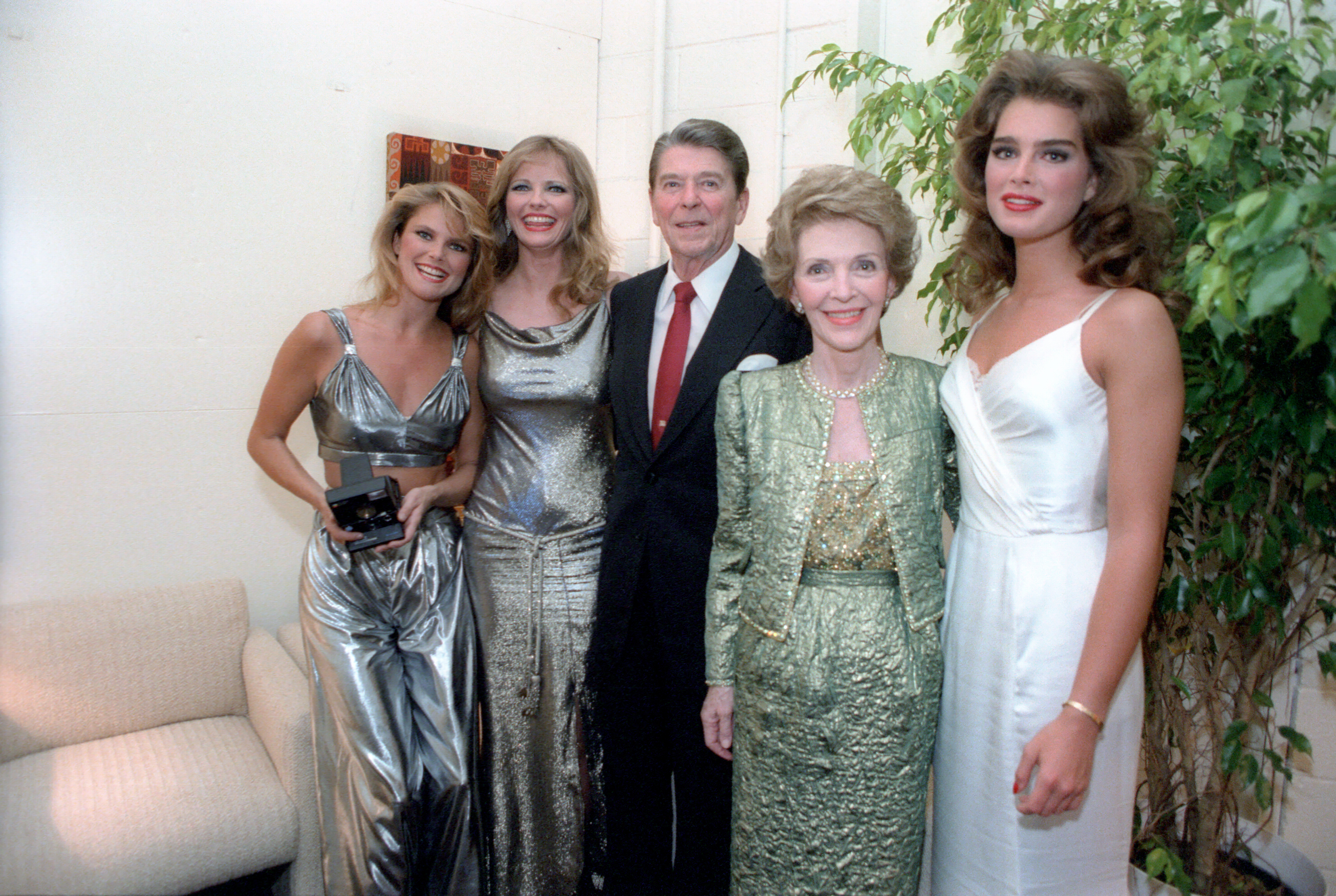
Christie Brinkley, Cheryl Tiegs, President Ronald Reagan, Nancy Reagan and Brooke Shields posing together at a tribute to Bob Hope's 80th birthday.

In 1980, Tiegs launched a signature line of clothing and accessories for Sears. The first retail venture by a supermodel, the Cheryl Tiegs collection neared $1 billion in sales by 1989. Tiegs was credited with helping the retail chain's 1980s turnaround, and once again appeared on the cover of Time, this time for a cover story titled "Sassy Sears". A doll in her likeness was created in 1990 as part of the "Real Model Collection", which additionally featured Christie Brinkley and Beverly Johnson. In 1995, Tiegs established Cheryl Tiegs Sportwear, which sold exclusively on QVC. She also developed a line of wigs and hair accessories for Revlon.

In 2012, Tiegs was a contestant on Celebrity Apprentice, with proceeds from her participation benefiting the Farrah Fawcett Foundation. She has also appeared on NBC's Just Shoot Me, Oxygen's Girls Behaving Badly and, in a recurring role, portraying herself in Family Guy. Tiegs hosted a 13-part travel adventure series, Pathfinders: Exotic Journeys for the Travel Channel, appeared as a judge on the ABC reality show True Beauty, and was a regular guest on The Oprah Winfrey Show. Additionally, Tiegs has frequently appeared on The Today Show, Access Hollywood, Extra, and The Dr. Oz Show. Her film credits include Vincent Gallo's The Brown Bunny, and Walk Hard: The Dewey Cox Story with John C. Reilly. Tiegs created and was featured in Sports Illustrated's exercise video Aerobic Interval Training.

Tiegs is the spokeswoman for Renewal: A Time for You, a program created by Deepak Chopra which offers practical advice on healthy lifestyle changes for women in transition. Additionally, she is the spokesperson for Cambria, a producer of natural quartz surfaces.

== Philanthropy and activism ==
Tiegs is active in the philanthropic community, and serves on the Board of Directors of C.O.A.C.H. for Kids and the Earth Conservation Corps. She is a spokeswoman for City of Hope and an Ambassador for the International Planned Parenthood Foundation. Tiegs also supports the Macula Vision Research Foundation, I Am Waters, and the Farrah Fawcett Foundation. As an activist, Tiegs explored the effects of global warming via an expedition to the Arctic. She also participated in a General Motors environmental program, driving a hydrogen-powered fuel cell vehicle for three months to raise awareness for zero emissions. In 2010, she appeared on Living with Ed, to promote environmentally conscious living, and was named "Green Star of the Week" by Access Hollywood.

== Personal life ==
Tiegs has been married four times: to film director Stan Dragoti (from 1970 to 1979); to photographer Peter Beard (from 1981 to 1983); to Anthony Peck (from 1990 to 1995), son of actor Gregory Peck; and to yoga instructor Rod Stryker (from 1998 to 2001). She has three sons: Zachary (born in 1991), with Anthony Peck, and twins Theo and Jaden (born in 2000), who were delivered via surrogacy during her marriage to Stryker.

Tiegs lived in Bel Air, California, but placed her home on the market in May 2015 for $15 million.

== List of appearances ==
=== Film ===
Year	Title	Role	Notes
2003	The Brown Bunny	Lilly	
2007	Walk Hard: The Dewey Cox Story	Herself	Cameo appearance

=== Television ===
Year	Title	Role	Notes
1979	Superstars	Herself	Documentary
1979	Playboy's Roller Disco & Pajama Party	Herself	Television special
1979–81	The American Sportsman	Narrator	3 episodes
1980	Making Xanadu: The Musical Fantasy Movie	Wrap-up party guest	
1981	Bob Hope's All-Star Comedy Look at the Fall Season: It's Still Free and Worth It!	Herself	Television special
1983	Andy Warhol's TV	Herself	Episode: "Pilot"
1985	Frank Sinatra: Portrait of an Album	Herself	Television special
1986	Moonlighting	Herself	Episode: "It's a Wonderful Job"
1995	The John Larroquette Show	Lola Valenti	Episode: "Time Out"
2000	The Infinite Power Workout	Herself	Episode: "300"
2000–02	Just Shoot Me!	Herself	2 episodes
2002	Hollywood Squares	Herself	6 episodes
2009	True Beauty	Herself	12 episodes
2011	Rupaul's Drag Race	Herself	1 episode
2012	The Apprentice	Contestant	14 episodes
2011–13	Family Guy	Herself	2 episodes
2015	Childrens Hospital	Herself	Episode: "Just Like Cyrano de Bergerac"
2016	Sharknado 4: The 4th Awakens	Raye	Television film

=== Video games ===
Year	Game	Role	Notes
2015	Family Guy: The Quest for Stuff	Herself	Voiced herself

== Books ==
- Tiegs, Cheryl; Lindner, Vicki (October 29, 1980). The Way to Natural Beauty. New York: Simon & Schuster. ISBN 0671248944. 284 pp.
