= Echo (2003 film) =

- Film poster
- Directed by: Tom Oesch
- Starring: Haven Pell
- Release date: 2003
- Country: United States
- Language: English

Echo is a 2003 short film written and directed by Tom Oesch. It stars Haven Pell, Sean Le, and Armand Kirshman.

== Overview ==
The short film tells the story of an American soldier’s grief, guilt, and descent into madness when he encounters a local boy carrying a mysterious package in the war-torn jungle of Vietnam.

Echo was produced at the USC School of Cinematic Arts. It features black-and-white cinematography by Kevin Oeser and a film score by Sasha Ivanov.

In 2004, the film won at the "46th Rochester International Film Festival."
