= Ali MacGraw =

American actress (born 1939)

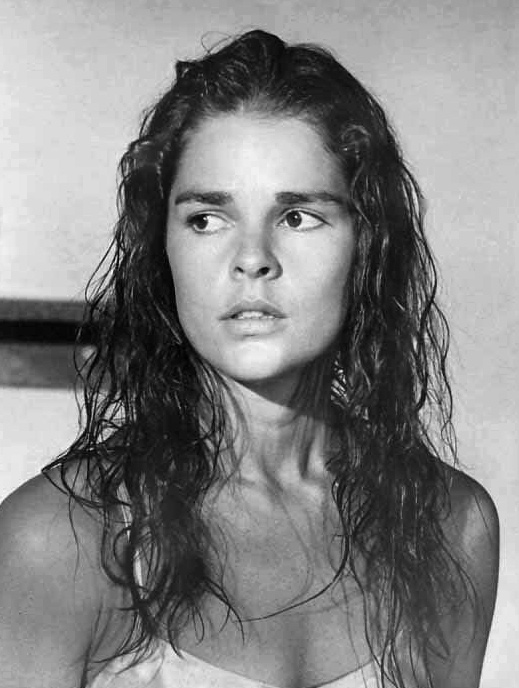
- MacGraw in The Getaway, 1972
- Born: Elizabeth Alice MacGraw; April 1, 1939 (age 87)
- Education: Wellesley College
- Occupations: Actress; model; author; animal welfare activist
- Years active: 1960–present
- Spouses: Robin Hoen (m. 1960; div. 1962) Robert Evans (m. 1969; div. 1973) Steve McQueen (m. 1973; div. 1978)
- Children: Josh Evans

Elizabeth Alice MacGraw (born April 1, 1939) is an American actress. For her role in Goodbye, Columbus (1969) she won a Golden Globe Award for Most Promising Newcomer. She then starred in Love Story (1970), for which she was nominated for an Academy Award for Best Actress and won a Golden Globe Award for Best Actress in a Motion Picture – Drama. In 1972, MacGraw was voted the top female film star in the world and was honored with a hands and footprints ceremony at Grauman's Chinese Theatre after having made just three films. She went on to star in The Getaway (1972), Convoy (1978), Players (1979), Just Tell Me What You Want (1980), and The Winds of War (1983). In 1991, she published an autobiography, Moving Pictures.

== Early life ==
MacGraw was born on April 1, 1939. She is the daughter of Frances and Richard MacGraw. She has one brother, Dick, an artist, and grew up in the suburb of Pound Ridge, New York. MacGraw's mother chose not to disclose her Jewish ancestry to Ali's father, instead professing ignorance about it. "I think Daddy was bigoted," MacGraw has said.

Her mother was considered a "pioneer" as an artist, who had taught in Paris before settling in Greenwich Village. Her parents married when her mother was nearing 35: "My gorgeous father: a combination of Tyrone Power and a mystery, a brilliant artist and a brain beyond brains." He was born in New Jersey with his childhood spent in an orphanage. He ran away to sea when he was 16, studied art in Munich and built a career as a commercial artist. MacGraw adds, "Daddy was frightened and really, really angry. He never forgave his real parents for giving him up." As an adult, he constantly suppressed the rage he built up against his parents. She described her father as "violent".

MacGraw attended Rosemary Hall in Greenwich, Connecticut and graduated from Wellesley College in Wellesley, Massachusetts in 1960.

== Career ==
=== Early career ===
Beginning in 1960, MacGraw spent six years working at Harper's Bazaar magazine as a photographic assistant to fashion maven Diana Vreeland. She worked at Vogue magazine as a fashion model and as a photographer's stylist. She has also worked as an interior designer. She was photographed for a Chanel ad in 1966.

=== Film and television ===
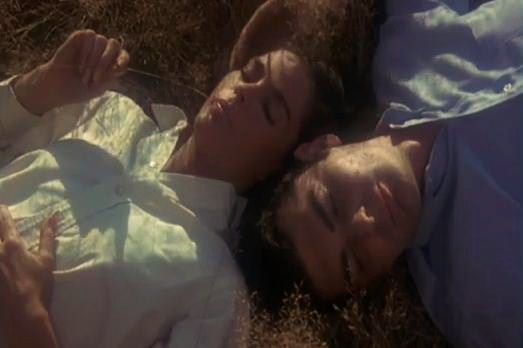
With Richard Benjamin in Goodbye, Columbus (1969)

MacGraw began her acting career in television commercials, including one for the Polaroid Swinger camera. In one commercial for International Paper, she was on a beach in a bikini made of Confil and went for a swim underwater to prove its strength and durability. MacGraw gained widespread attention with Goodbye, Columbus (1969), her first leading role, but real stardom came when she starred opposite Ryan O'Neal in Love Story (1970), one of the highest-grossing films in U.S. history. The film, and MacGraw's performance in particular, received widespread critical acclaim, and earned her the Golden Globe Award for Best Actress in a Motion Picture – Drama, in addition to a nomination for the Academy Award for Best Actress. Following Love Story, MacGraw was celebrated on the cover of Time (January 11, 1971 edition).

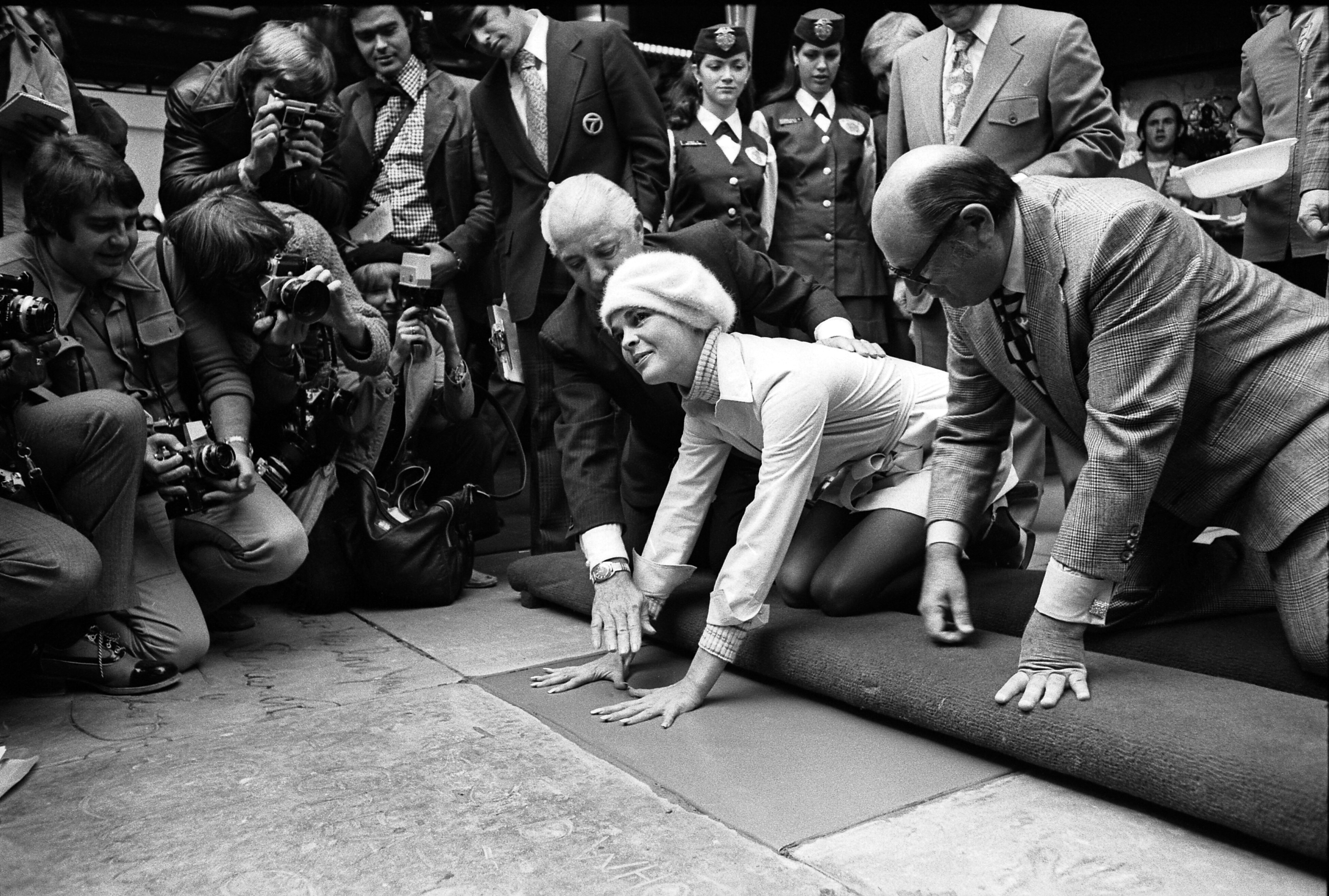
Ali MacGraw placing her hand prints in cement at Grauman's Chinese Theatre in 1972

In 1972, after appearing in just three films, she had her handprints, footprints, and autograph engraved at Grauman's Chinese Theatre. She then starred opposite Steve McQueen in The Getaway (1972), which was one of the year's top ten films at the box office. Having taken a five-year break from acting, in 1978 MacGraw re-emerged in another box office hit, Convoy (1978), opposite Kris Kristofferson. She then appeared in the films Players (1979) and Just Tell Me What You Want (1980), directed by Sidney Lumet.

In 1983, MacGraw starred in the highly successful television miniseries The Winds of War. In 1985, MacGraw joined hit ABC prime-time soap opera Dynasty as Lady Ashley Mitchell, which, she admitted in a 2011 interview, she did for the money. She appeared in 14 episodes of the show before her character was killed off in the "Moldavian Massacre" cliffhanger episode in 1985.

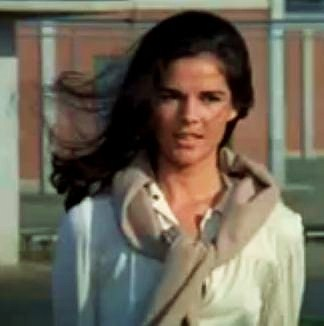
Ali MacGraw in The Getaway, 1972

She also hosted segments for the Encore Love Stories premium cable network in the late 1990s and 2000s.

In February 2021, MacGraw and O'Neal were honored with stars on the Hollywood Walk of Fame, 50 years after the release of Love Story.

=== Stage ===
MacGraw made her Broadway theater debut in New York City in 2006 as a dysfunctional matriarch in the drama Festen (The Celebration).

In 2016, MacGraw reunited with Ryan O'Neal in a staging of A.R. Gurney's play Love Letters, which toured the US and UK through 2017.

=== Magazine recognition ===
In 1991, People magazine selected MacGraw as one of its "50 Most Beautiful People" in the World.

In 2008, GQ magazine listed her in their "Sexiest 25 Women in Film Ever" edition.

=== Yoga ===
Having become a Hatha Yoga devotee in her early 50s, MacGraw produced a yoga video with the American Yoga Master Erich Schiffmann, Ali MacGraw Yoga Mind and Body. The impact of this bestselling video was such that in June 2007, Vanity Fair magazine credited MacGraw with being one of the people responsible for the practice's recent popularity in the United States.

== Animal welfare ==
In July 2006, MacGraw filmed a public service announcement for People for the Ethical Treatment of Animals (PETA), urging residents to take their pets with them in the event of wildfires. In 2007, she advocated to ban cockfighting in New Mexico. In 2008, she wrote the foreword to the book Pawprints of Katrina by author Cathy Scott and photography by Clay Myers about Best Friends Animal Society and the largest pet rescue in U.S. history. MacGraw is also a U.S. Ambassador for animal welfare charity Animals Asia. She has been a life long lover of Scottish Terriers, now having her sixth. An animal welfare advocate throughout her life, she received the Humane Education Award by Animal Protection of New Mexico for speaking out about animal issues.

== Personal life ==
While in college, MacGraw met German Canadian Robert "Robin" Martin Hoen, a Harvard-educated banker, and the couple married on October 29, 1960. They divorced in July 1962.

Following her first divorce, MacGraw had a string of relationships and one abortion; the procedure was still illegal at the time. In 1979, MacGraw's mother, who was 38 when she had her, revealed that she had an abortion of her own in the early 1920s.

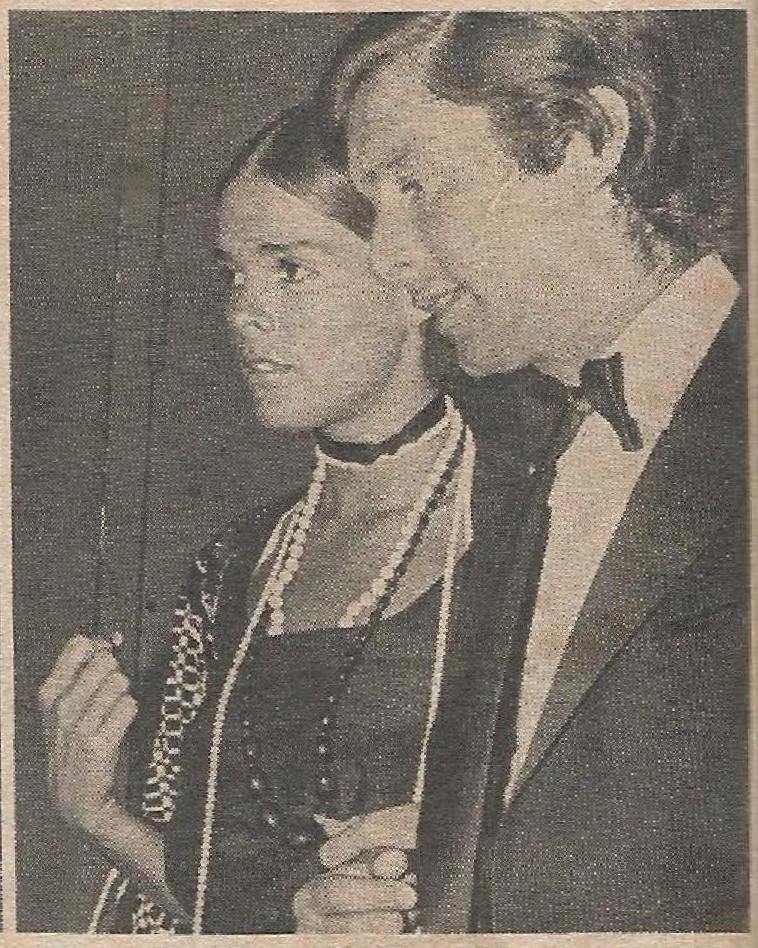
With Robert Evans in 1972

On October 24, 1969, MacGraw married film producer Robert Evans. Their son, Josh Evans (born January 16, 1971), is an actor, director, producer and screenwriter. They separated in 1972 after she became involved in a public affair with Steve McQueen on the set of The Getaway. MacGraw's divorce from Evans was finalized on June 7, 1973, and on July 12, she married McQueen in Cheyenne, Wyoming. They divorced in August 1978.

In the nearly half-century since her divorce from McQueen, MacGraw has never remarried. Her boyfriends have included Warren Beatty, Rick Danko, Bill Hudson, Ronald Meyer, Rod Stryker, Fran Tarkenton, Peter Weller, Henry Wolf and Mickey Raphael.

MacGraw's autobiography, Moving Pictures, revealed her struggles with alcohol and sex addiction. She was treated for the former at the Betty Ford Center.

When ex-husband Evans received his star on the Hollywood Walk of Fame in 2002, she accompanied him. Their grandson Jackson was born in December 2010 to Josh and his wife, singer Roxy Saint. After Evans' 2019 death, MacGraw told The Hollywood Reporter, "Our son, Joshua, and I will miss Bob tremendously, and we are so very proud of his enormous contribution to the film industry." Evans told Vanity Fair in 2010 that MacGraw had remained a close friend.

MacGraw has lived in Tesuque, New Mexico, since 1994, after the house she rented in Malibu was destroyed by a fire.

== Filmography ==
=== Feature films ===
| Year | Title | Role | Notes |
|---|---|---|---|
| 1968 | A Lovely Way to Die | Melody | |
| 1969 | Goodbye, Columbus | Brenda Patimkin | Golden Globe Award for New Star of the Year – Actress; Nominated—BAFTA Award for Most Promising Newcomer |
| 1970 | Love Story | Jennifer Cavilleri | Golden Globe Award for Best Actress in a Motion Picture – Drama; David di Donatello Award for Best Foreign Actress; Nominated—Academy Award for Best Actress |
| 1972 | The Getaway | Carol McCoy | |
| 1978 | Convoy | Melissa | |
| 1979 | Players | Nicole Boucher | |
| 1980 | Just Tell Me What You Want | Bones Burton | |
| 1985 | Murder Elite | Diane Baker | |
| 1994 | Natural Causes | Fran Jakes | |
| 1997 | Glam | Lynn Travers | |
| 1999 | Get Bruce | Herself | |

=== Television ===
| Year | Title | Role | Notes |
|---|---|---|---|
| 1983 | The Winds of War | Natalie Jastrow | Miniseries |
| 1983 | China Rose | Rose | TV movie |
| 1985 | Dynasty | Lady Ashley Mitchell | 14 episodes |
| 1992 | Survive the Savage Sea | Claire Carpenter | TV movie |
| 1993 | Gunsmoke: The Long Ride | Uncle Jane Merkel | TV movie |

=== Documentaries ===
| Year | Title |
|---|---|
| 2002 | The Trail of the Painted Ponies |
| 2005 | Passion & Poetry: The Ballad of Sam Peckinpah |
| 2007 | Do You Sleep in the Nude? |
| 2009 | Split Estate |
| 2010 | Landscapes of Enchantment |
| 2012 | Valles Caldera: The Science |
