= Death in the Desert (film) =

- theatrical release poster
- Directed by: Jose Evans
- Written by: John Melmoth
- Produced by: Josh Evans
- Starring: Michael Madsen; Shayla Beesley; John Palladino
- Narrated by: Michael Madsen
- Edited by: Edward D. Wood, Jr.
- Music by: Chris Goss
- Distributed by: Osiris Entertainment
- Release dates: October 9, 2015 (Arizona Underground); March 2016
- Running time: 83 minutes
- Country: United States
- Language: English

Death in the Desert Is a 2015 American love-drama film directed and produced by Josh Evans, and starring Michael Madsen, Shayla Beesley, John Palladino, Paz de la Huerta and Roxy Saint. Principal filming completed in February 2014 in Las Vegas, Nevada. It is the second film collaboration between Madsen and Evans, who produced The Price of Air in which Madsen starred.

Released in March 2016 by Osiris Entertainment, the film is based on the book Death in the Desert by true-crime author Cathy Scott about Ted Binion, a wealthy gambling executive and one of the sons of famed Las Vegas casino magnate Lester Ben "Benny" Binion, owner of Binion's Horseshoe. The book adaptation was written by screenwriter John Melmoth.

The storyline covers the real-life 1998 death of the younger Binion, a drug addict who had lost his Nevada gaming license, and his live-in girlfriend Sandra Murphy, charged with murdering Binion along with her lover Rick Tabish, who was caught digging up Binion's buried silver.

== Reception ==
The film first premiered in October 2015 at the Tucson Festival of Films.

Indiewire wrote, "Luckily for Madsen fans, the actor looks to be having a complete blast in his most recent film, Death in the Desert.

Vegas Seven Magazine, in its review, wrote, "Death in the Desert, despite its protagonist’s wealth, rides the downbeat vibe of a back-alley, underbelly Vegas. What emerges is a muted, thoughtful study of disillusionment, dashed dreams and fatal appetites via a relationship that takes root amid the mechanical sensuality of a Downtown strip joint."

Movies Review 101 described the film as "already labelled a 'classic' by The Huffington Post, who applauded the film’s 'captivating' cast of characters and 'dark and addictive' story" which is "expected to win Michael Madsen some of the best notices of his career."

== Cast ==
- Michael Madsen as Ray Easler
- Shayla Beesley as Kim Davis
- John Palladino as Matt Duvall
- Paz de la Huerta as Margo
- Roxy Saint as Cory
- Julian Brand as Nicky Ramone
- Eduard Osipov as Pete
- Kent Christian as Faque Brown
- Timothy Skyler Dunigan as Rocky
- Kerry Fezza as Nurse
- Richard Hotson as Mac Curry
- Mark Justice as Rudy
- Allison Lear as Christy
- Stephen Manley as Cicero
- Alfonzo McCarther as Merced
- Joe Palubinsky as Garza
- Gary Sax as Wesley
- Brian H. Scott as David Mattsen
