= Die Trying =

Die Trying may refer to:

- Die Trying (band), an American rock band
  - Die Trying (album), a 2003 album by the band
- "Die Trying" (PartyNextDoor, Drake, and Yebba song)
- "Die Trying", a song by Art of Dying from the album Vices and Virtues
- Die Trying (novel), a 1998 Jack Reacher novel by Lee Child
- "Die Trying", an episode from season 3 of Star Trek: Discovery
