= James Jurdi =

American actor, screenwriter, and film producer

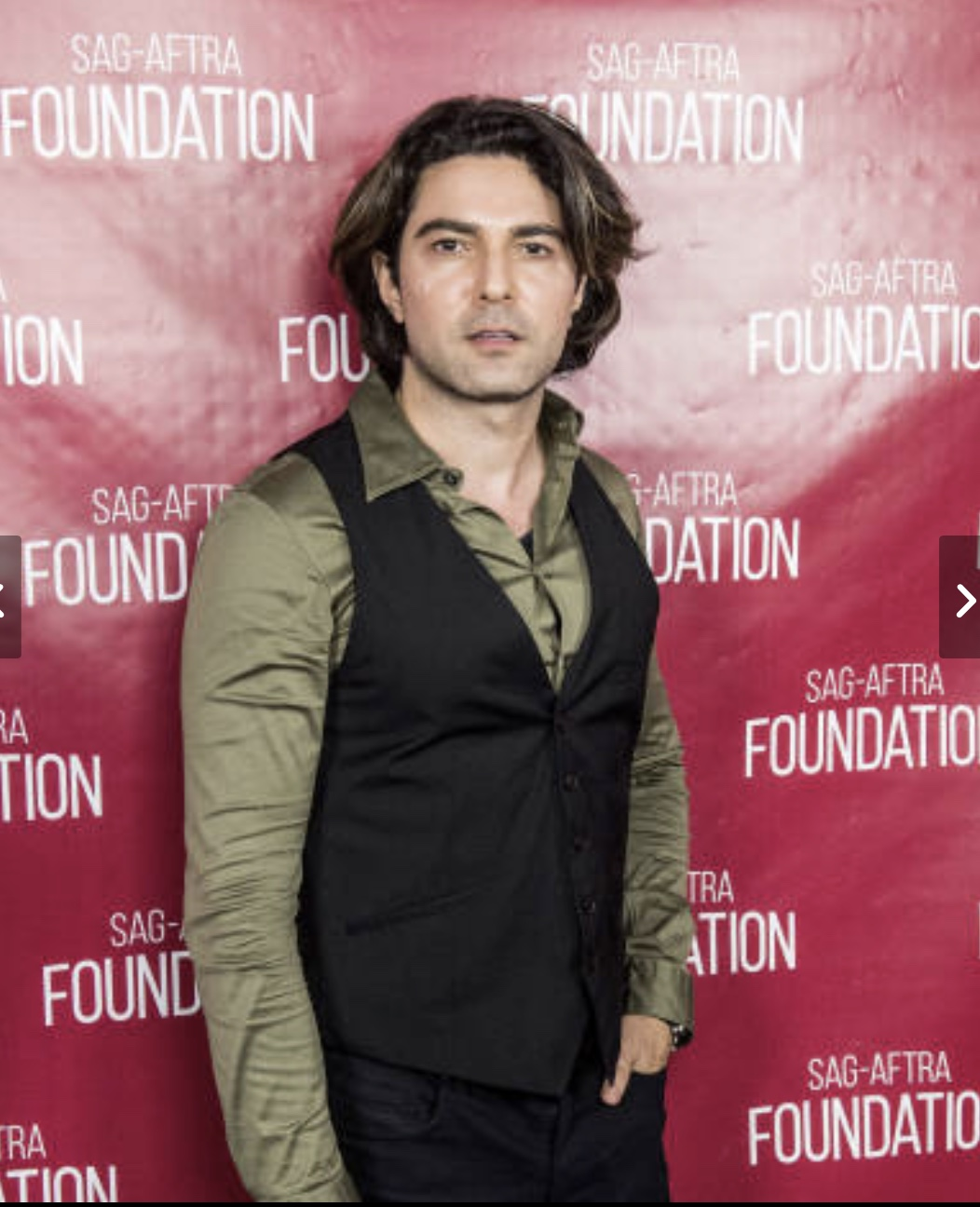
- Born: Los Angeles, California
- Education: UCLA
- Occupations: Actor, screenwriter, and producer

James Jurdi is an American actor, screenwriter, and film producer. He is best known for his roles in the films Pocket Listing, Danger One, and Reaper.

== Early life ==
James Jurdi was born in Los Angeles, California and is of Lebanese-American descent. He attended UCLA, where he studied cinema, playwriting, and performance arts.

== Career ==
As a television actor, Jurdi has appeared in roles in The Bold and The Beautiful, Melrose Place, and General Hospital. Jurdi co-wrote the 2014 supernatural horror-thriller feature film Reaper; he also co-produced and played a role in the film. In 2015 he then wrote and acted in the role of Jack Woodman in the crime-thriller film Pocket Listing. Jurdi then acted in the 2018 film Danger One, a movie he also co-produced. In the film, he plays a paramedic that keeps a share of a million dollars that he and his partner find on a dying man they have been called to save. Jurdi is the cofounder of Mythmaker Productions.
