= Ken Davitian =

American-Armenian actor

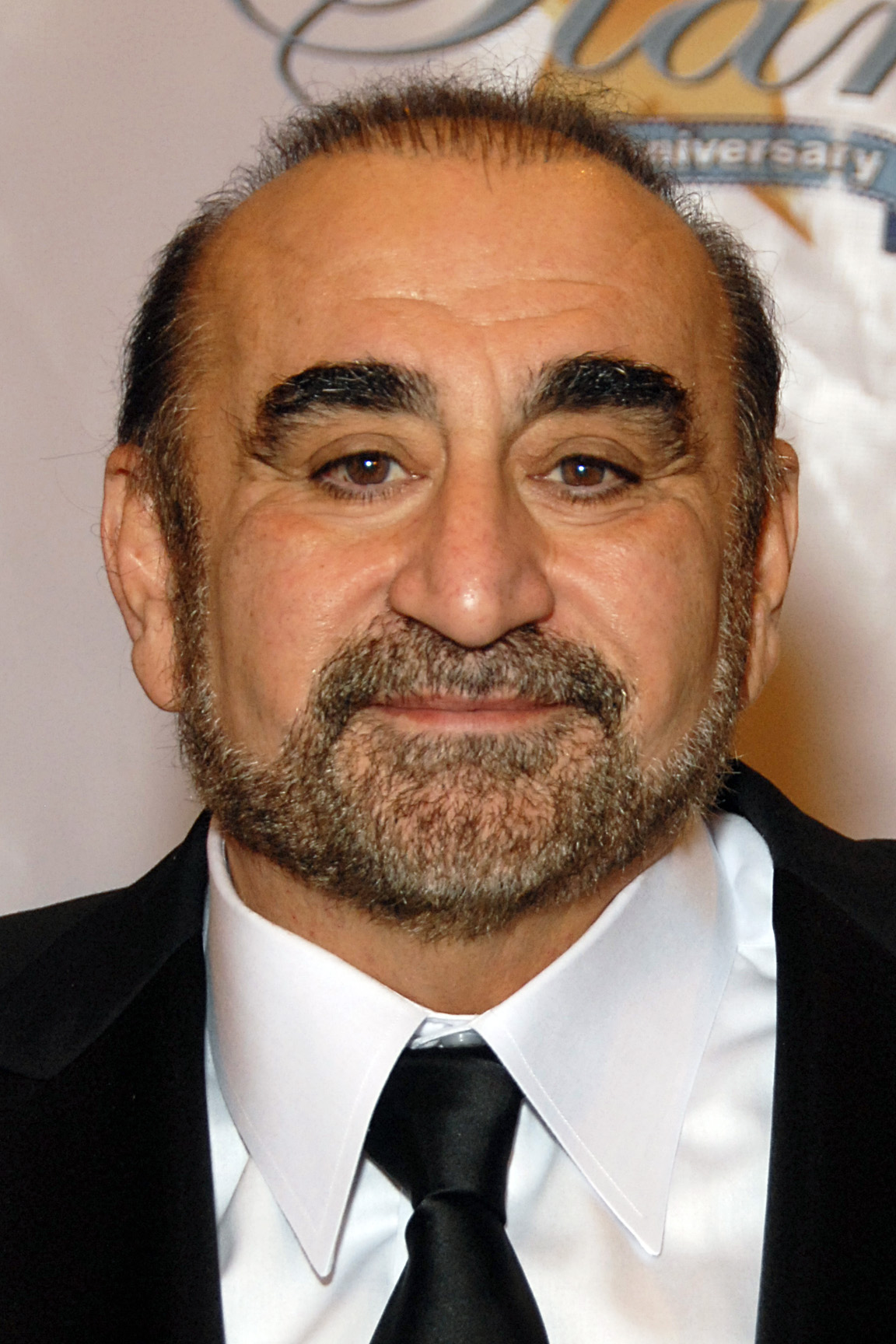
- Davitian attending the "Night of 100 Stars" for the 82nd Academy Awards viewing party at the Beverly Hills Hotel on March 7, 2010
- Born: Kenneth Davitian; 19 June 1953 (age 73); Los Angeles, California, U.S.
- Education: Whittier College
- Occupations: Actor; comedian; restaurateur
- Years active: 1975–present

Kenneth Davitian (Armenian: Քենեթ Դավիթյան; born June 19, 1953) is an American actor, best known for his role as Borat's producer Azamat Bagatov in the 2006 comedy film Borat, and for his role as Shtarker in the 2008 action-comedy film Get Smart.

== Early life, family and education ==
Kenneth Davitian was born in Los Angeles on June 19, 1953, to an Armenian American family from Montebello, California. His maternal grandparents were survivors of the Armenian genocide. His father was a Red Army soldier during World War II who was captured by Wehrmacht forces and placed at an Armenian Legion camp in Stuttgart, Germany. After the end of the war, he immigrated to the US through the efforts of restaurateur and chef George Mardikian, known for his philanthropy.

Davitian graduated from Garfield High School in East Los Angeles and Whittier College. His teenage idol was Burt Reynolds, who greatly influenced his choice of becoming an actor. Davitian would go on to perform in the film Pocket Listing, which also featured Reynolds. Davitian worked in his father's waste management company.

Davitian is fluent in Armenian; he speaks the language as Azamat in Borat.

== Restaurant ventures ==
Davitian founded a restaurant in 2003 called The Dip, which was located in Los Angeles. His son Robert used to run his baseball-themed hot dog restaurant The Infield in Sherman Oaks, which boasted a hot dog, conceived by Charlie Sheen, called the "Charlie Sheen Dog with Tiger Blood".

== Filmography ==
=== Film ===
Year	Title	Role	Notes
1975	Sons of Sassoun	Freedom Fighter	
1977	Prime Time a.k.a. American Raspberry	Fat Bartender	
1991	Talkin' Dirty After Dark	Seat Mate	
1991	Bikini Summer	Max	
1992	Tuesday Never Comes	Greenberg	
1992	Maximum Force	Fat Man	
1992	Return to Frogtown	Bud	
1993	Sexual Intent	Topless Bar Owner	Direct-to-video
1993	Private Wars	Bartender	Direct-to-video
1994	The Silence of the Hams	Luciano Pavarotti	
1994	Red Sun Rising	Cab driver	
1995	Lord of Illusions	Swann Audience Member	Uncredited
1996	The Garbage Man	Uncle Herbert	
2000	Virgins of Sherwood Forest	Manny / Friar Tuck	Direct-to-video
2000	Our Lips Are Sealed	Thug No. 1	
2001	Bukas, Babaha ng Dugo	Raul	Filipino film
2002	May	Foreign Doctor	
2002	Boris	Pawn-Shop Dealer	Short film
2002	After Freedom	Jacob	
2003	A Man Apart	Ramon Cadena	
2003	Holes	Igor Barkov	
2003	S.W.A.T.	Uncle Martin Gascoigne	
2004	L.A. Twister	Walter	
2006	Borat	Azamat Bagatov	
2007	Lucky You	Poker Player	Uncredited
2007	South of Pico	Nick	
2007	On Bloody Sunday	Grandpa	
2008	Get Smart	Shtarker	
2008	Stone & Ed	Senor Gordo	
2008	Meet the Spartans	Xerxes	
2008	Julia	Taxi Driver	
2008	Lonely Street	Raj (Motel Owner)	
2008	Float	Vahig Manoogian	
2008	Soul Men	Ardesh Kezian	
2009	Not Forgotten	Father Salinas	
2010	Let the Game Begin	Eric Banks	
2010	The Prankster	Stavros Karas	
2011	You May Not Kiss the Bride	Vlatko 'Vadik' Nikitin	
2011	The Artist	Pawnbroker	
2011	The Ballerino	Sergey 'Sam' Belyakova / Homeless Bob	Short film
2012	Sharkproof	Yuri	
2012	Melvin Smarty		
2013	Abstraction	Jacob Sarian	
2014	Small Time	Wexler	
2014	Walk of Shame	Cab Driver	
2015	Pocket Listing	Mr. Mousian	
2015	Big Baby	Underbrunter	
2015	Burn Off		
2016	Nina	Club Owner	
2016	Paint It Black	Masha The Baker	
2016	The Hollywouldn'ts	Frankie 'The Method' DeSayse	
2017	The Sex Addict	Ken Davitian	
2017	The President's Sun	Khoren	Short film
2017	Once Upon a Time in Venice	Yuri	
2017	Price for Freedom	Sheik Omar	
2017	Five Star Fouad	Fouad	Short film
2018	Diverted Eden	Scotty	
2018	The Samuel Project	Vartan	
2020	Roe v. Wade	Papa Potemkin	
2021	Habit	Gus	
2024	Angels Fallen: Warriors of Peace	Armen	
TBA	Concert Heroes		

=== Television ===
Year	Title	Role	Notes
1996	Saved by the Bell: The New Class	Gus	Episode: "Trash TV"
1997	C-16: FBI	Professor David Amir	Episode: "The Sandman"
1997	Players	Big Oscar	Episode: "Contact Sport"
1998	Soldier of Fortune, Inc.	Russian Captain	Episode: "Double-Edged Sword"
1999	Oh, Grow Up	Taxi Driver	Episode: "President of the House"
1999	Becker	Cab Driver	Episode: "Hate Thy Neighbor"
2000	Missing Pieces	Jorge	Television film
2000, 2007	ER	Zakar Papazian	2 episodes
2000	L.A. 7	Alphonse	Episode: "House Sitting"
2000	Strong Medicine	Cabbie	Episode: "Drug Interactions"
2001	Arliss		Episode: "As Others See Us"
2002	The Shield	Older Armenian	Episode: "Blowback"
2002	Gilmore Girls	Jesus	Episode: "Take the Deviled Eggs..."
2003	Six Feet Under	Krikor Hovanessian	Episode: "I'm Sorry, I'm Lost"
2003	The Division	Archimedes	Episode: "Hearts & Minds"
2003	Boomtown	Jewelry Store Owner	Episode: "Wannabe"
2004	Line of Fire	Zach	Episode: "I'm Your Boogie Man"
2005	Mind of Mencia	Gardner	Episode: #1.2
2006	Boston Legal	Mr. Kahanov	Episode: "Chitty Chitty Bang Bang"
2006	The Closer	Mr. Sarcasian	Episode: "To Protect & to Serve"
2006	Friday Night with Jonathan Ross	Azamat Bagatov	Episode: #11.8
2006	Saturday Night Live	Azamat Bagatov	Episode: "Hugh Laurie/Beck"
2007	Ghost Whisperer	Jake Rose	Episode: "The Collector"
2008	Starting Under	Ken	Television film
2009	Chuck	'Uncle' Bernie	Episode: "Chuck Versus the First Kill"
2011	The Cape	Store Owner	Episode: "Tarot"
2011	Big Time Rush	King of Kerplankistan	Episode: "Big Time Wedding"
2012	Chasing the Hill	Arnold Sarca	Episode: "Awesomeness Is a Warm Gun"
2012	Natasha Mail Order Bride Escape to America	Boris the Butcher	Television film
2013	It's Always Sunny in Philadelphia	Snyder	Episode: "The Gang Broke Dee"
2014	Two and a Half Men	Mr. Mardirosian	Episode: "Lotta Delis in Little Armenia"
2015	Hawaii Five-0	Omar Sadek	Episode: "A Make Kaua"
2015	Ray Donovan	Vartan	3 episodes
2017	Small Shots	Amir	2 episodes
2017	All Wrong	Kourosh	Television miniseries
2018	3rd Eye	Zoran Fashard	
2018–2021	Cobra Kai	Armand Zarkarian	3 episodes
2018	BBZ Good Morning Horizon: The Royal Wedding LIVE Coverage	Hank Markle	Television film
2018	Actress: Another Word for Waitress	Giagni Mustavo	Episode: "SHOWTIME"
2019	NCIS: Los Angeles	Narek	Episode: "Human Resources"

=== Video games ===
Year	Title	Role	Notes
1996	The Adventures of Pinocchio	Grande	

=== Music videos ===
Year	Title	Director	Label	Role	Notes
1999	Stand Inside Your Love	W.I.Z.	Virgin Records	Throne figure	
