= Just Tell Me What You Want =

1980 film by Sidney Lumet

- Theatrical release poster
- Directed by: Sidney Lumet
- Written by: Jay Presson Allen
- Produced by: Jay Presson Allen; Sidney Lumet
- Starring: Ali MacGraw; Alan King; Peter Weller; Myrna Loy; Dina Merrill; Keenan Wynn; Tony Roberts
- Cinematography: Oswald Morris
- Edited by: Jack Fitzstephens
- Music by: Charles Strouse
- Distributed by: Warner Bros.
- Release date: January 18, 1980
- Running time: 112 minutes
- Country: United States
- Language: English
- Box office: $2.1 million (domestic)

Just Tell Me What You Want is a 1980 American comedy film directed by Sidney Lumet. It stars Ali MacGraw, Peter Weller and Alan King, and was also Myrna Loy's final film. The screenplay by Jay Presson Allen, adapted from her novel, won her the David di Donatello Award for Best Screenplay of a Foreign Film. This is MacGraw's last leading role in a film.

== Plot ==
Max Herschel, the married, wealthy, vulgar, egotistical, middle-aged head of a corporate empire, is satisfied with the somewhat casual love/hate relationship he shares with his mistress and protegee, television producer "Bones" Burton, just as it is, but she wants a more serious commitment.

The young woman attempts to extricate herself from the affair—or perhaps force her lover into taking the next, more permanent step—by dating a younger man, off-off-Broadway playwright Steven Routledge. Max, however, is not a man to accept defeat in any of his endeavors, and he retaliates with a vengeance.

The two engage in an escalating battle of wits, with Max discovering that money cannot resolve everything when he is outsmarted by business rival Seymour Berger and his grandson Mike. It leads to a comic fight between Max and Bones at New York's Bergdorf Goodman.

== Cast (in alphabetical order) ==
- Judy Kaye as the Baby
- Alan King as Max Herschel
- Myrna Loy as Stella Liberti
- Ali MacGraw as Bones Burton
- Joseph Maher as Dr. Coleson
- Dina Merrill as Connie Herschel
- Tony Roberts as Mike Berger
- Peter Weller as Steven Routledge
- Keenan Wynn as Seymour Berger

== Production ==
The film features the last motion picture performance of Myrna Loy, who plays Herschel's confidential secretary.

Interiors of the Warner Bros. Pictures release were filmed at the Kaufman Astoria Studios in Queens, New York, with Manhattan exteriors (and the scene inside Bergdorf Goodman) shot on location.

== Critical reception ==
In his review in Time, Frank Rich stated, "After a brisk 20 minutes, the movie loses its assurance and sense of purpose. Indeed, Jay Presson Allen's screenplay reels around like a drunken sailor. From moment to moment, Just Tell Me is a somber and confusingly plotted story of corporate power struggles, a syrupy account of a love triangle, and a sloppy satire of show business...There are still some bright moments, but they are separated by flaccid, poorly connected scenes that go nowhere at great length. The few high points belong to King and MacGraw. [He] is too much of a pussycat to convey the hero's toughness, but he delivers Allen's best sallies with crackling speed...Though MacGraw is no comedian, she is animated and playful for the first time in memory."
