= Glam (film) =

- Directed by: Josh Evans
- Written by: Josh Evans; Uri Zighelboim
- Produced by: Josh Evans; Caradoc Ehrenhalt; Thomas Garvin; H. Michael Heuser; Zachary Matz
- Starring: William McNamara; Natasha Gregson Wagner; Frank Whaley; Jon Cryer; Tony Danza; Ali MacGraw
- Cinematography: Fernando Arguelles
- Edited by: Richard Candib
- Music by: Mouse on Mars (original version); Josh Evans and Geoffrey Moore (final version)
- Distributed by: Cineville Entertainment
- Release date: October 1997 (Vancouver)
- Running time: 92 minutes
- Country: United States
- Language: English

Glam is a 1997 experimental drama film directed by Josh Evans.

== Plot ==
Sonny (William McNamara) travels to Los Angeles to visit his cousin Franky (Frank Whaley), and is introduced to a grim world of sex and violence.

== Cast ==
- William McNamara as Sonny Daye
- Frank Whaley as Franky Syde
- Natasha Gregson Wagner as Vanessa Mason
- Valérie Kaprisky as Treasure
- Tony Danza as Sid Dalgren
- Jon Cryer as Jimmy Pells
- Ali MacGraw as Lynn Travers
- Donal Logue as Tom Stone

== Production ==
The film was Josh Evans' second effort as a director, following 1994's Inside the Goldmine, which also featured actress Natasha Gregson Wagner. When Inside the Goldmine performed well at Seattle and Montreal festivals, independent film company Cineville agreed to back his next project Glam. Cineville were able to finance its seven figure budget through foreign pre-sale contracts.

=== Music ===
Once principal photography wrapped in Los Angeles, Evans flew to Europe to work on the film's score with German electronic duo Mouse on Mars. Evans would end up rejecting the soundtrack they created, due to its overly experimental and unorthodox sound, instead creating his own electronic score. Mouse on Mars later released their music for Glam in 1998, to critical acclaim.

== Release ==
Glam premiered at the Vancouver International Film Festival in October 1997. Prior to being released in America, the film received an NC-17 rating for "a scene of explicit sexuality and some sexual dialogue."

=== Reception ===
Leonard Klady of Variety reviewed the film in November 1997, stating "Josh Evans’ second feature, Glam, is another downbeat saga certain to enhance his rep but unlikely to break the bounds of specialized exhibition. A grim tale of Hollywood hustlers and marginals, the film is confident, disturbing and sometime diffuse. A technical tour de force, its assured vision will divide both audiences and critics but will leave an indelible impression on the few willing to venture inside the nightmarish world."

Kevin Thomas of the Los Angeles Times wrote in 1998 that "Evans really is fearless: He's made the kind of picture that those who aren't ready to go along with him will dismiss as arty and pretentious but that pays off for those willing to pay attention and go the distance."
