= Erich Schiffmann =

American yoga master

Erich Schiffmann (born 1953 in Los Angeles, California) is an American yoga teacher, known for his 1994 video, Yoga Mind & Body, featuring actress Ali MacGraw. He is the author of a best-selling book, Yoga: The Spirit and Practice of Moving into Stillness. He has taught yoga for more than forty years.

He deepened his practice of yoga with Desikachar and Iyengar in India, and with Dona Holleman and Vanda Scaravelli in Europe.

Yoga Journal called Schiffmann one of the "innovators" of today's yoga and "an accomplished and popular teacher". He has produced numerous yoga instructional videos and conducts yoga workshops and teacher training throughout the United States and internationally. He currently resides in Santa Monica, California.

He is married to fellow yoga teacher Leslie Bogart, daughter of film actors Humphrey Bogart and Lauren Bacall.

== Books and videos ==
- Schiffmann, Erich (1996). Yoga: The Spirit and Practice of Moving into Stillness. New York: Pocket Books. ISBN 0-671-53480-7.
- Schiffmann, Erich (Yoga Master); and MacGraw, Ali (Performer) (1994). Yoga, Mind & Body (Videotape). Burbank, Calif.: Warner Home Video.
