= Pocket Listing (film) =

2015 film

- Theatrical release poster
- Directed by: Conor Allyn
- Screenplay by: James Jurdi
- Produced by: Alejandro Salomon; Frederic Cipoletti; Naji Jurdi
- Starring: James Jurdi; Logan Fahey; Caitlin Gerard; Christos Vasilopolous; Jessica Clark; Rob Lowe; Ken Davitian; Burt Reynolds
- Cinematography: Amanda Treyz
- Edited by: Nic Hill; Brett Solem
- Music by: Sean Murray
- Production companies: Helios Productions; Mythmaker Productions
- Distributed by: Metro-Goldwyn-Mayer; Orion Pictures; Momentum Pictures
- Release date: December 2, 2016
- Running time: 92 minutes
- Country: United States
- Language: English

Pocket Listing is a 2016 American neo-noir black comedy film directed by Conor Allyn, written by James Jurdi, and starring Jurdi, Logan Fahey, Caitlin Gerard, Christos Vasilopolous, Jessica Clark, Rob Lowe, and Burt Reynolds. The film was acquired by Metro-Goldwyn-Mayer and Orion Pictures for limited theatrical and video on demand release on December 2, 2016.

It has been described as a "darkly comic crime thriller" which centers on "the story of a former hot-shot Los Angeles property broker who is given a second chance by a corrupt power couple with a commission to sell their Malibu mansion, a deal riddled with criminal activity.

== Plot ==
Set around the issue of the U.S. real-estate market and its various casualties, Frank Hunter and his sultry wife, Lana, hire disgraced Los Angeles property broker, Jack Woodman, to discreetly market and sell their Malibu villa. Fired from a top broker firm by real-estate mogul Ron Glass, and framed by his menacing, drug-addled son, Aaron, Woodman soon finds himself in a world of double crosses, mistaken identity and crooked deals, the type that are literally life or death.

== Cast ==
- Rob Lowe as Frank Hunter
- Burt Reynolds as Ron Glass
- James Jurdi as Jack Woodman
- Jessica Clark as Lana Hunter
- Logan Fahey as Aaron Glass
- Noel Gugliemi as "El Cabron"
- Ken Davitian as Mr. Mousian

== Critical reception ==
Ben Gummery of Battle Royale with Cheese wrote: "This plays like a ‘Wolf of Wall Street‘ tale for the L.A. property market however in the third act this turns into more of a Cohen-brothersesque dark comedy of betrayal and adultery" and ended his review by writing that "this is a fun little flick."

Weetas wrote that the film is one of the essential movies about real estate. "Another thriller that takes place in the real estate arena, this great movie ... is part thriller and part black comedy, it shows the shady side of huge real estate deals...it is very entertaining to watch."

Steve Cook of the American Genius wrote that "It’s a hip new Hollywood offering with an edgy story line about money, greed, power, sex, revenge, redemption, and real estate. In that order...Set in Malibu and featuring such well-worn talent as Rob Lowe and Burt Reynolds, the flick is a racy shoot‘em up about an extraordinary villa with a pool that seems to flow off the edge of a cliff into a Malibu arroyo."
