= Reaper (film) =

2014 American slasher film

- Theatrical release poster
- Directed by: Philip Shih
- Screenplay by: James Jurdi/Mark James
- Produced by: Alejandro Salomon; Frederic Cipoletti; James Jurdi
- Starring: Danny Trejo; Vinnie Jones; Jake Busey; Shayla Beesley; James Jurdi; Linda Mendez; Christopher Judge
- Edited by: Nic Hill
- Music by: Sean Murray
- Distributed by: Entertainment One
- Release dates: October 6, 2014 (United Kingdom); June 6, 2015 (United States)
- Running time: 90 minutes
- Country: United States
- Language: English

Reaper is a 2014 American slasher film directed by Philip Shih and written by James Jurdi and Mark James. The film stars Danny Trejo, Shayla Beesley, Vinnie Jones, Jake Busey, James Jurdi, and Christopher Judge. It was released in the United States on June 9, 2015 by Entertainment One.

In the film, a female hitchhiker seduces and robs two men in a desperate attempt to pay for her mother's medical expenses. She is soon targeted by a religious fanatic who wants to personally execute sinners. She is taken to the church building where he habitually transports his victims.

== Plot ==
A former cult leader escapes the electric chair and returns as a supernatural serial killer named Reaper, wreaking havoc on a small county and targeting those he believes to be sinners.

Natalie, an attractive hitchhiker, gets picked up by alcoholic salesman Bill, but his car breaks down and they wind up at a motel. Bill and Natalie check in as newlyweds and get intimate. She spikes his cup of Jack Daniels with a sleeping pill, ties him up, and takes his wallet and car keys. The Reaper kills Bill with a scythe. Natalie calls her mother and finds out that her mother needs money for her surgery, or else the bank will cancel her hospice. Natalie says to her that she will get the money and pay for the operation.

She stops in at a diner. Rob, a mob boss, realizes that his young protege Brad has been botching his tasks. Rob gives Brad a final chance and throws him some money to finish up a pending deal. After witnessing Brad tip a waitress handsomely, Natalie sets her sights on him, first tampering with his wheels, then running him over. Feigning concern, she runs out of the car and offers him a ride. Some sexual foreplay ensues, but she convinces him to get her a drink from a liquor mart, then zooms off with his money and gun.

Natalie finds out that Brad is a drug mule, and his dealer, truck driver Jack, is at the same motel she stayed at with Bill. Two hit men enter the motel and are killed by the Reaper. The motel owner tries to rape her when she tries to call the police. The Reaper kills him. Jack and Brad decide to help Natalie. A policeman named Banks arrives and takes them into custody. The Reaper lures Banks to follow him with a shotgun. Rob, fed up with Brad's inability to close the deal, goes after him. Natalie and the others are locked in a supply closet for their safety. After searching the motel, Banks is killed by the Reaper. The trio escape from the supply closet, and decide to work together to fight the Reaper.

They try to escape in Jack's truck, but she removed the distributor cap. Brad and Natalie decide to put their differences aside and locate the money and the drugs. Brad is cornered by Rob, but Natalie drops a fire extinguisher on Rob's head. Rob survives and slaps Natalie around. Brad kills him with his own knife. Jack pulls up in the truck. Brad shoots Jack, intending to take the money and the drugs for himself and strand Natalie as payback for robbing him earlier. He is killed by the Reaper.

Natalie is captured by the Reaper, then taken to a church where he brings his victims. He starts to torment her, planning to send her to hell. Jack (who survived his gunshot wound) returns and drowns the Reaper in a bucket of water, saving Natalie's life. Jack tells Natalie to start her life all over before dying. She calls her mother to let her know she is on her way to see her. Natalie takes off in Jack's truck, then picks up a female hitchhiker who asks about Natalie's story. She smiles, asking how much time she has got.

The Reaper survived and rises to his feet, on his way to continue reaping.

== Cast ==
- Danny Trejo as Jack
- Vinnie Jones as Rob
- Jake Busey as Bill
- Shayla Beesley as Natalie
- James Jurdi as Brad
- Linda Mendez as Natalie's mother
- Christopher Judge as Officer Banks
- Justin Henry as Caine
- Ian Fisher as Vagabond

== Production ==
Much of the film was shot at the Tudor-style getaway "The Glen Tavern Inn" in Santa Paula, California.

== Reception ==
=== Critical responses ===
The film was hyped for its pairing of "indie film icons Danny Trejo and Vinnie Jones," said David McNary of Variety.

Steve Barton of Dread Central wrote "Danny Trejo and Vinnie Jones. If ever there were a magic pairing of violence and machismo in cinema, this is it. Putting these two together is a no-brainer, and now thanks to this new film, appropriately titled Reaper, that’s just what we’re getting!".

Ryan Miller of JoBlo.com wrote: " We can't possibly ignore the fact that two of cinemas most badass mother f*ckers will be sharing the screen together now can we!"

Matt Wavish of Horror Cult Films wrote: "Now here is a damn fine paring (sic) up of movie hardmen if ever there was one!"

Upon its release, the film was met with favorable reviews from critics. Ben Gummery of Battle Royale With Cheese wrote: "the film features a strong cast..." then added that "I found the characters in this film really well developed; especially for a genre where there is usually more attention paid to killing off characters than giving them believable stories. Trejo plays a character he has played many times before and easily masters; the toughened criminal with morals. He even brandishes a Machete in tribute to his best known role. Beesley is a revelation as Natalie and we see her character jump off the screen and delve to new depths as the story develops. Busey; despite only making a brief appearance is electric as Bill and really helps to kick start the film; following his success in the From Dusk till Dawn: The Series. I also really enjoyed Jurdi’s performance as self-interested criminal Brad." Gummery ended his review by writing "as a stand-alone movie it is enjoyable and a must see for fans of this horror sub-genre".

Horror Cult Films wrote "it’s crime narrative and the performances from Busey, Beesley, Jurdi and Trejo make it an entertaining watch of sorts" also adding that "The Last Chance hotel is also one of the stars of the film in its own little way. The hotel, much like Psycho’s The Bates Motel, is home to a creepy receptionist named Caine (Justin Henry), whose religious talk and peak cap eblazoned (sic) with the word ‘Repent’ should have been enough for the characters to think twice... The hotel acts as a prison for the film’s survival scenes to take place and in that respect it does a decent enough job."

A review on Realm of Horror wrote that "I was pleased to find it actually exceeded my expectations... Its (sic) quite different in that no one in the film can actually be classed as a “good guy”. Everyone has a dark side ... overall, I found the film to be thoroughly entertaining.
