= Danger One =

- Theatrical release poster
- Directed by: Tom Oesch
- Screenplay by: Steffen Schlachtenhaufen
- Produced by: Dwjuan F. Fox; Naji Jurdi; Mark James; James Jurdi; Scott C. Silver
- Starring: Tom Everett Scott; James Jurdi; Angelica Celaya; Denis O'Hare; Damon Dayoub; Charles Shaughnessy; Michael O’Neill
- Cinematography: Vance Burberry
- Edited by: Thomas Sabinsky
- Music by: Nima Fakhrara
- Production companies: Mythmaker Productions; Silvatar Media
- Distributed by: Entertainment Studios; Freestyle Releasing
- Release date: September 14, 2018
- Running time: 101 minutes
- Country: United States
- Language: English

Danger One is a 2018 action comedy film directed by Tom Oesch, written by Steffen Schlachtenhaufen, and starring Tom Everett Scott, James Jurdi, Angelica Celaya, and Denis O'Hare. The film was acquired by Freestyle Releasing, the digital division of Byron Allen Entertainment Studios, and released theatrically and via digital platforms on September 14, 2018.

== Plot ==
In Los Angeles, paramedics Dean and Eric pick up a dying man from a car wreck and find a million dollars hidden in his clothes. Dean and firefighter Max convince the hesitant Eric to keep the money, seeing it as a chance to escape their struggles. Meanwhile, immigration agent Beckwith is investigating the money smuggling operation connected to the wreck, and a ruthless enforcer, Craddock, is also on Dean and Eric’s trail. Dean's plan quickly unravels when Max grows distrustful and demands his share of the cash. Amid the chaos, Max is killed. As Dean and Eric try to dispose of his body, Beckwith pulls them over, suspecting their involvement, but they manage to escape after another violent altercation. Back at the ambulance station, their cunning coworker, EMT Brie, finds out about the money and insists on receiving a portion of it. Eric, fed up with the greed and violence, attempts to burn the cash, but Brie knocks him unconscious and some of it is saved. The situation escalates when Craddock shows up, posing as an insurance investigator. After a shootout and car chase, Craddock and Brie are killed. Mortally wounded, Dean reveals he hid the money in case Brie tried to steal it from them and tells Eric the location. Eric returns home to his family, haunted by the night's horrors but hoping for a fresh start.

== Cast ==
- Tom Everett Scott as Dean
- James Jurdi as Eric
- Angelica Celaya as Brie
- Denis O’Hare as Craddock
- Damon Dayoub as Max
- Michael O'Neill as Beckwith
- Charles Shaughnessy as Akkerman
- Julissa Bermudez as Montez
- Kelly Frye as Valerie
- Stephen A. Chang as Wong

== Production ==
The screenplay was written in the aftermath of the Great Recession and intended as an indictment of capitalism. The filmmakers wanted to tell a story about the anxiety and anger of working men and women who fear an uncertain future in an economy they’re told is strong. The script was also inspired by the director’s upbringing (his father was a medical doctor) and the ‘80s/‘90s buddy action comedies that he and the writer had grown up with.

Tom Everett Scott joined the production only two days before cameras started rolling. Other actors that were considered for the role were Bokeem Woodbine, Seann William Scott, and Michael Rapaport.

Damon Dayoub was initially cast as one of the corrupt ICE agents. But when the filmmakers couldn’t decide between Angelica Celaya and Julissa Bermudez for the role of Brie, they cast them both: Bermudez took over the ICE agent role from Dayoub who then went on to play firefighter Max instead.

Prior to filming, director Tom Oesch spent a week choreographing all the fight scenes in the producer’s backyard. Because of the tight schedule, however, there was no time for stunt rehearsals ahead of principal photography and so the actors all had to quickly learn the choreography on set.

Most of the ambulance interiors were “cheated” in front of three large rear-projection screens that had been set up inside a warehouse that doubled as the paramedics’ headquarters. That warehouse was located right next door to a recycling plant, which made so much noise that a large portion of the dialog had to be re-recorded in post-production.

Filming lasted 23 days. It took place in Los Angeles, Anaheim, Vernon, and Griffith Park.

The initial director’s cut was a few minutes shorter than the final cut that was eventually shown in theaters.

== Reception ==
David Duprey of That Moment In rated it 3 1/2 out of 5 stars and called it “a clever comedy with a string of smart turns and a genuinely entertaining style that give it plenty to keep it in the black.” He added that “what works best in all this is Oesch’s direction, his quick cuts and closeups helping a lot in giving it some momentum as it pushes towards its chaotic end. This is a good looking movie.”

Writing for Horror Geek Life, Frankie Torok gave it 3 out of 5 stars and wrote that it is “a fun movie, with some great performances and one hell of a climax”, adding that “The stand-out performances definitely come from Scott and O’Hare. Dean’s a well crafted, ego-centric, charismatic nightmare, with not a single ounce of conscience, but as it turns out, a fairly big heart.”

Remy Cashman of HorrorBuzz wrote that the film “features strong performances from leads played by Tom Everett Scott, Damon Dayoub, and James Jurdi” and added that “a hand-held camera can be overwhelming but it works well for this film to reflect its overall energy and tone.”
