= A Perfect Ending =

2012 film by Nicole Conn

- Movie poster for A Perfect Ending
- Directed by: Nicole Conn
- Written by: Nicole Conn
- Story by: Marina Rice Bader
- Produced by: Marina Rice Bader
- Starring: Barbara Niven; Jessica Clark; John Heard; Morgan Fairchild; Rebecca Staab; Kerry Knuppe
- Edited by: Nicole Conn
- Production company: Naledi Tlhoaele
- Release date: June 21, 2012 (Frameline 36)
- Running time: 110 minutes
- Country: United States
- Language: English

A Perfect Ending is a film written and directed by Nicole Conn.

== Plot ==
The film immediately introduces the two main protagonists. Paris (Jessica Clark) is a young, dark-haired woman who works as a high-priced escort/call-girl, but is a creative artist by nature. Rebecca (Barbara Niven) is a rich, blonde, middle-aged wife. The initial voice-over also narrates a cancer affliction that has grown beyond hope.

Rebecca has lived a wealthy yet unhappy existence in creating a seemingly perfect family with her husband Mason Westridge (John Heard). The signs of trouble are their hostility towards each other and conflicting opinions about whether Jessica, Rebecca's only daughter, who has a different father, should receive equal stock shares of the family business as her two half-brothers. It is revealed that Mason had attempted to, and possibly succeeded in, sexually assaulting Jessica.

Rebecca feels an emotional emptiness and confides in her two lesbian best friends that she has never had an orgasm, and that she and Mason only have sex once every six months, which is fine with her. One of her friends suggests that Rebecca try a very discreet escort service run by her own cousin (Morgan Fairchild).

Rebecca meets Paris and through a series of very discreet meetings, Rebecca eventually opens to Paris' gentle advances, achieving her goal of having sex with another woman and experiencing happiness and satisfaction.

We learn that Paris, who is well appreciated for her services, seems to be in agony over a past mistake that had led her to this profession. It is implied that Paris' husband died after she accidentally pushed him into the road and he was hit by a car shortly after their wedding day. It is Rebecca who later helps Paris to let go of her past and heal.

Meanwhile, one of the three Westridge children finds the medical report of inoperable cancer that Mason Westridge has been hiding in his office desk. They all confront Rebecca and ask whether she had known about it all along. The children assume that the report refers to their father, and Rebecca tells her children that they are not to mention it. Rebecca contacts another escort, Paris' friend, and gives her an envelope of money to help Paris leave the escort world and pursue her artistic talents. She reveals that she is the one who has cancer, and that she is dying. Afterwards, Rebecca makes the courageous decision to say goodbye to Paris.

Towards the end of the movie, Rebecca is seen as a butterfly, beautiful girl and such a kind human. Someone who has learned to spread her wings because of her relationship with Paris. In the final scene, Paris has her own art exhibition after Rebecca's funeral. Jessica approaches Paris and introduces herself, as the two lesbian best friends watch, and says, "I want to learn about my mother at the end."

== Cast ==
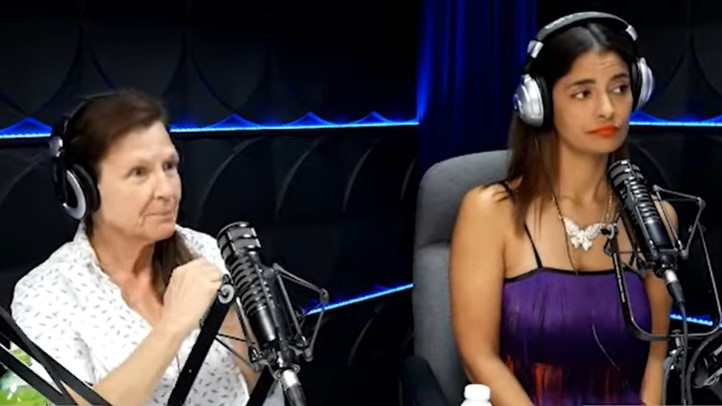
Director Nicole Conn and actress Jessica Clark in 2023.

- Barbara Niven as Rebecca Westridge
- Jessica Clark as Paris
- John Heard as Mason Westridge
- Morgan Fairchild as Valentina
- Rebecca Staab as Sylvie
- Kerry Knuppe as Jessica Westridge
- Imelda Corcoran as Kelly
- Mary Jane Wells as Shirin
- Michael Adam Hamilton as Aaron Westridge
- Bryan Jackson as Hank Westridge
- Gloria Gifford as Sharon
- Marc Crumpton as Jared
- Lauryn Nicole Hamilton as Janice
- Cathy DeBuono as Dawn
- Lee Anne Matusek as Megan
- Erika Schiff as Ella
- Gary Weeks as Dr. Weller
