= Josh Evans (film producer) =

American filmmaker

- Born: Joshua Evans; January 16, 1971 (age 55); New York City, U.S.
- Occupations: Filmmaker, author, actor, screenwriter
- Notable work: Glam; Born on the Fourth of July
- Spouses: Charis Michelsen (m. 2003; div. 2011) Roxy Saint (m. 2012)
- Children: 1
- Parents: Robert Evans (father); Ali MacGraw (mother)

Joshua Evans (born January 16, 1971) is an American filmmaker, screenwriter, author, and actor best known for his role in Born on the Fourth of July (1989).

== Early life and education ==
Evans was born in New York City to actress Ali MacGraw and producer Robert Evans. His father was of Russian-Jewish descent, and his maternal grandmother was of Hungarian-Jewish ancestry. His maternal grandfather was Irish. Evans is the nephew of the late producer Charles Evans, Sr., the stepson of actor Steve McQueen, and the stepbrother of actor and race car driver Chad McQueen. Evans grew up in Los Angeles and graduated in 1989 from the private Crossroads School in Santa Monica.

== Career ==
He earned a Young Artist Awards in 1988. He went on to produce, direct, write and act. Most notably, he acted as Ron Kovic's hippie younger brother in Born on the Fourth of July, which won a 1990 Golden Globe Award, and John Lithgow's character's servile assistant in Ricochet.

The Daily Press's Kevin Thomas called Inside the Goldmine (1994), which Evans wrote, directed and starred in, a "meaningful look at a nihilist" and "the kind of film that could be made only by someone prepared to strive for self-knowledge."

He followed Inside the Goldmine by producing and directing the 35mm Glam, which a Los Angeles Times review called "an edgy tale of Hollywood innocence, corruption."

About Evans's third independent film, The Price of Air, a Los Angeles Times review pointed out that "Evans also stars, giving a persuasive portrayal as the naive but likable slacker, Paul... ." Variety wrote about the plot, in which the lead character agrees to courier a package of illicit drugs, "Conceptually, it’s an intriguing notion for a movie... ."

Evans also wrote, produced and directed the 2005 independent film Che Guevara starring Eduardo Noriega. The film screened at a 2006 conference sponsored by UCLA's Latin American Center's Working Group on Education and Culture.

In February 2014, filming in Las Vegas completed for Death in the Desert, a full-length movie directed and produced by Evans and starring Michael Madsen, Shayla Beesley Paz de la Huerta and Roxy Saint . The score for a song performed by Roxy Saint, was done by Chris Goss. The film is based on the book Death in the Desert by Cathy Scott with the screenplay written by John Steppling. The film had its world premiere at the Tucson Film Festival, on October 9, 2015, which was presented by the Arizona Underground Film Festival. Distribution was scheduled for 2016 by Osiris Entertainment.

== Book ==
Evans wrote and published a novella titled Gold Star in April 2013.

== Filmography ==
=== Actor ===
- Dream a Little Dream (1989) - Low Life #1
- Born on the Fourth of July (1989) - Tommy Kovic
- The Doors (1991) - Bill Siddons
- Ricochet (1991) - Kim
- Grey Knight (1993) - Lt. Regis
- Inside the Goldmine (1994) - Clyde Daye
- The Price of Air (2000) - Paul
- The Kid Stays in the Picture (2002) - Himself (archive footage)
- Thirty Nine (2016) - Adam

=== Director ===
- Inside the Goldmine (1994)
- Glam (1997)
- The Price of Air (2000)
- Che Guevara (2005)
- Everybody Dies (2009)
- Thirty Nine (2013)
- Death in the Desert (2015)

=== Writer ===
- Inside the Goldmine (1994)
- Glam (1997)
- The Price of Air (2000)
- Che Guevara (2005)
- Thirty Nine (2013)

=== Producer ===
- Glam (2001)
- Che Guevara (2005)
- Thirty Nine (2013)
- Death in the Desert (2014)
