= Jessica Clark (actress) =

British model and actress

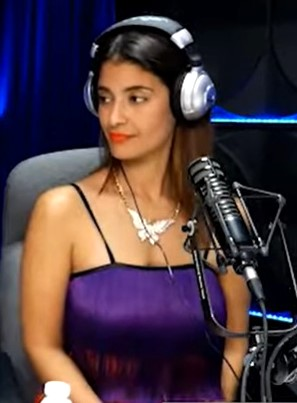
- Clark in 2023
- Born: 21 April 1985 (age 40); United Kingdom
- Spouse: Lacey Stone (m. 2010; div. 2012)
- Website: "Jessica Clark — " at the Wayback Machine (archived 13 December 2015)

Jessica-Rose Clark (born 21 April 1985) is a British model and actress.

== Early life and education ==
Clark grew up in London; she is of Irish, Indian, and Nigerian descent. At 16, she won a national modeling competition, and signed with Models 1. Choosing initially to combine modeling with her studies, Clark attended the London School of Economics as a law undergraduate with the intention of pursuing a law career. However, the success of her modeling career led her to leave the program after 18 months, and move first to Paris and then a year later to New York City.

== Career ==
Clark is signed with Marilyn NY Agency. Clark has worked with clients such as Hermes, Redken, and L’Oreal. She has also appeared in magazines such as Vogue, Vogue India, Elle, Marie Claire, and Jalouse. She has walked the runway for designers such as Hermes, Bottega Veneta, and Matthew Williamson.

While living in New York City, Clark had trained as an actress, and in 2011 relocated to Los Angeles where she has appeared in TV and independent film. Clark had a central role in the feature film A Perfect Ending, a 2012 lesbian film directed by Nicole Conn. She played the vampire goddess Lilith in True Blood. In 2015, she had a central role in the satirical thriller Pocket Listing.

== Personal life ==
Clark is openly lesbian. She is one of the hosts of the Vlog Lesbian love, on AfterEllen. She married fitness professional Lacey Stone in 2010, but the couple divorced in 2012.

== Filmography ==
Year	Title	Role	Notes
2004	MTV of "Burn" by Usher	Female Lead	Music video
2010	Sara	Lexus	Short film
2011	Bed. Head.	Maya	Short film; also writer
2012	State of Georgia	Natalia	Episode: "Pilot"
2012	Chemistry	Chantal	6 episodes
2012	A Perfect Ending	Paris	feature-length film
2012–2013	True Blood	Lilith	9 episodes
2014	Pocket Listing	Lana Hunter	
2014	Girlfriends' Guide to Divorce	Merete	2 episodes
2014	Revenge	Pretty Woman	Episode: "Struggle"
2015	Murder in the First	Rachel	2 episodes
2019	Alien: Harvest	Hannah	Short film
2019	Season of Love	Lou	Feature-length film
2024	Dragon Age: The Veilguard	Neve Galus	Video game

== Awards ==
Clark is the recipient of a New Now Next Award (2009) in the category "Cause You're Hot".
