= Tom Oesch =

Tom Oesch

Tom Oesch (born September 27, 1980) is a Swiss filmmaker working in Hollywood, California.

== Biography ==
Tom Oesch grew up in Rebstein, a small rural town in Switzerland. After his mother had taken him to see Jurassic Park at the local movie theater, he decided that he wanted to make a film himself. He shot his first short with his brother's help on his father's old S-VHS camcorder at age 14. That short film ended up being shown on national TV and went on to win several awards at various Swiss film festivals.

After high school and a handful of other short films, he decided to relocate to Los Angeles in 2000 to pursue filmmaking professionally. He attended both Los Angeles City College and USC School of Cinematic Arts where he wrote and directed another dozen shorts. He graduated in 2004 and directed his first music video just a few months later.

He continued to direct and edit music videos, commercials, and other short form content, and soon also worked for many of the major TV networks (HBO, BBC, VH1, Sy Fy, E! Entertainment, Oxygen, Bravo, BET, OWN, Lifetime, Spike TV, Animal Planet, and many more).

He completed his first feature film in 2017, the action comedy Danger One, starring Tom Everett Scott, Denis O'Hare, Michael O'Neill, and Charles Shaughnessy. The film was based on his original idea and it was released in the United States in theaters and on VOD by Freestyle Digital Media on September 14, 2018.
