= Bare (2015 film) =

2015 film by Natalia Leite

- Theatrical release poster
- Directed by: Natalia Leite
- Written by: Natalia Leite
- Produced by: Alexandra Leite; Natalia Leite; Chad Burris
- Starring: Dianna Agron; Chris Zylka; Louisa Krause; Paz de la Huerta
- Cinematography: Tobias Datum
- Edited by: Joe Murphy
- Production companies: Purple Milk; Indion Entertainment Group
- Distributed by: IFC Films
- Release dates: April 19, 2015 (Tribeca); October 30, 2015 (United States)
- Running time: 91 minutes
- Country: United States
- Language: English

Bare is a 2015 American drama film written and directed by Natalia Leite and produced by Alexandra Roxo, Natalia Leite, and Chad Burris. It stars Dianna Agron, Paz de la Huerta, Chris Zylka, and Louisa Krause. The film follows a young woman living in a small desert town in Nevada, who becomes romantically involved with a female drifter who leads her into a life of drugs, stripping, and psychedelic spiritual experiences. The film had its world premiere at the Tribeca Film Festival on April 19, 2015. IFC Films released it on October 30, 2015, in a limited release and through video on demand.

== Plot ==
Sarah Barton lives in a small Nevada desert town with her mother and works as a cashier. After a co-worker's complaint causes her to lose her job, she meets Pepper, a drifter who has crashed at an antiques store owned by her family. Intrigued by Pepper, Sarah allows her to stay at the store until she can find a place to live somewhere else. Sarah begins hanging out with Pepper and becomes drawn into Pepper's partying lifestyle, to the annoyance of her boyfriend, Haden, who does not understand why she has so little time for him. Haden offers to get her a job where he works and to let her stay with him, but she declines both offers.

On a trip to Reno, Sarah follows along as Pepper cons a gambler into giving them money to play blackjack. After celebrating their winnings, Pepper reveals that she works at a strip club, called the Blue Room, as a bartender. Sarah initially takes a job at a fast food restaurant but soon tries out for the strip club instead. The strippers laugh when Sarah suggests that Pepper is a bartender. One of the strippers gives Sarah a free sample of an unspecified drug (presumably cocaine), and Sarah goes out on the stage. After Sarah and Pepper ingest peyote in the desert, Pepper admits that stripping is addictive and difficult to stop, as the money is good. The two women promise each other that either will quit if the other does. The two then confess their mutual attraction to each other and have sex for the first time.

Meanwhile, Haden and Sarah's other friends become worried about her, as she has kept her new life secret from them. Sarah breaks up with Haden, telling him that they have gone in separate directions. When the other strippers tell Sarah that Pepper has worked in the past as a recruiter and seduced other women, Sarah becomes worried that she has been used. Pepper first denies everything but admits she has worked in the past as a recruiter; she still denies that she intentionally recruited Sarah or used her. After they reconcile, Sarah insists on paying off Pepper's debts so they can run away together and start over somewhere else.

However, an altercation breaks out at the strip club when a man accuses Pepper of not paying back the full debt. Sarah intercedes on Pepper's behalf, only to panic when she sees Haden and another friend about to enter the club. As she attempts to slip out unnoticed, Haden discovers her and berates her. A cop, drawn by the earlier disturbance, breaks up the scene and arrests Sarah for possession of a controlled substance when she accidentally drops several drugs. Outed as both a stripper and drug-user, Sarah at first attempts to return to her friends but finds them too judgmental. After offering to pay back her mother for bailing her out by working at the fast food restaurant she applied to in the first place, the two tearfully embrace. Sarah tells Pepper that she has become tired of the lifestyle and it can not continue, as it is counter to her values. In the final scene, Sarah is seen hitchhiking out of town by herself.

== Cast ==
- Dianna Agron as Sarah Barton
- Paz de la Huerta as Pepper
- Chris Zylka as Haden
- Louisa Krause as Lucille Jacobs
- Mary Price Moore as Linda Barton
- Lora Martinez-Cunningham as Jaz

== Production ==
Bare was filmed in Albuquerque and Moriarty, New Mexico, and Reno, Nevada; it started on July 31, 2014, and finished on August 23, 2014.

Director Natalia Leite wanted to cast two women who were willing to be totally raw and exposed on camera in the leading roles. She stated: "I wanted to find two women who were very different from each other to put those two contrasting energies together."

== Release ==
The film had its world premiere at the Tribeca Film Festival on April 19, 2015. The film was scheduled to be released in a limited release and through video on demand on October 30, 2015. The film is set to be released in the UK on April 25 through Paramount Pictures. Filmmaker Matt McKinzie wrote an essay for PopMatters that discussed queer female film, saying that Bare was mis-marketed to as arthouse and only granted limited release in a move "upholding the all-too-common tradition of erasing queer, female-driven narratives from the popular consciousness — as if a queer female audience did not exist, or if queer female narratives were incapable of being publicly embraced".

== Critical reception ==
Rotten Tomatoes reports that 56% of seven surveyed critics gave the film a positive review; the average rating is 5.9/10. Frank Scheck of The Hollywood Reporter wrote, "Performing her first onscreen nude scene, Agron is quite convincing as a character markedly different from her duplicitous cheerleader on Glee, well conveying Sarah's newfound sexual freedom and adventurousness." He also stated that de la Huerta was perfectly cast for her role as Pepper, though the film has a "mundane storyline".

Katie Walsh of the Los Angeles Times wrote, "Director Natalia Leite brings an emotional intelligence and sensitivity to Bare that raises it above its smutty late-night cable premise of a small-town girl falling into a lesbian affair and exploring the world of stripping".

John Stewart of The Slanted wrote, "The film is an wonderful departure for Glee’s Dianna Agron and her performance with Paz De La Huerta is sure to spark a lot more work in the future for both rising stars. Also deserving praise is the writer and director of the film Natalia Leite, a young woman that is quickly cementing her reign over highly-stylized and sexually progressive dramas."
