= Natalia Leite =

Brazilian writer and director

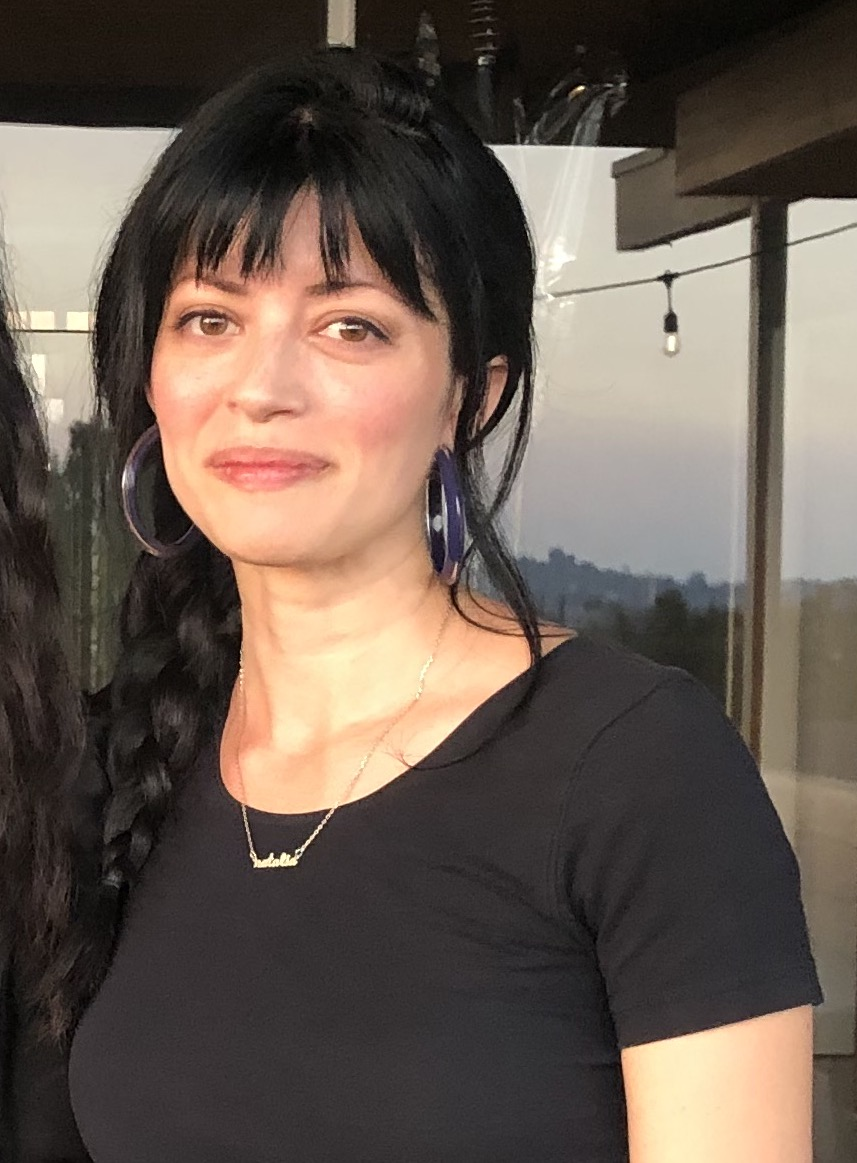
- Born: October 14, 1985; São Paulo, Brazil
- Occupations: Film director, screenwriter, producer
- Years active: 2014–present
- Notable work: Bare (2015); M.F.A. (2017); Be Here Nowish (2014–2016); The Handmaid's Tale (2022–2024); Black Cake (2023)

Natalia Leite is a Brazilian writer and director. She is best known for directing the indie hit film M.F.A., a feminist rape-revenge thriller that spurred debates at the start of the #MeToo movement. Subsequently, she went on to direct episodes of The Handmaid's Tale. Her work has been described as having “a bracing, assertive style” (Variety), "emotional intelligence" (Los Angeles Times), and as “cementing the reign over highly stylized, sexually progressive dramas” (Slant). Leite is known to incorporate her documentary subjects into her scripted films.

== Early life ==
Leite was born and raised in São Paulo, Brazil. She later studied at the San Francisco Art Institute.

Leite began her career showcasing drawings, photography, and performance art films in galleries. After moving to New York City, she started writing, directing, acting and producing her own micro-budget short films. From these early works she was able to raise financing for her first feature film.

== Career ==
Leite has directed feature films, television, and documentaries. She co-created, directed, and starred in the comedy web-series Be Here Nowish. In her unscripted show for Vice Media, Every Woman, she lived and worked as a stripper in a truck-stop in New Mexico, which she discovered while location scouting for Bare. She went on to create a pilot for a Vice TV series with a similar concept in which she would immerse herself in different female-centric worlds as a form of first-person investigative journalism.

Her directorial debut, Bare, stars Dianna Agron, Paz de la Huerta, Chris Zylka, and Louisa Krause. Bare premiered at the Tribeca Film Festival in 2015 to positive reviews and was bought shortly after by IFC for domestic theatrical distribution. Upon its premiere, Film Journal wrote "An award-winning director, Leite's portrait of Sarah's quest for identity is riveting for its storytelling and its direction." The Los Angeles Times wrote "Director Natalia Leite brings an emotional intelligence and sensitivity to Bare."

Leite's second feature film M.F.A. is a psychological thriller centered around rape crimes in a university and one art student who seeks revenge. The film premiered at SXSW in March 2017 to positive reviews and was nominated for a Grand Jury Award and a Game Changer Award. It stars Francesca Eastwood, Clifton Collins Jr., and Peter Vack. The film has been described as a "David Fincher-style thriller," "bravely tackling the dark side of empowerment," and as "an angry as hell piece of pulpy and politicized pop cinema."

Since 2021, Leite has directed numerous TV series. Most notably The Handmaid's Tale, The Twisted Tale of Amanda Knox, and Black Cake.

Frequently collaborating with Kyp Malone, Leite starred and co-directed the music video "Million Miles" for TV On The Radio. Malone then went on to create the original score for the film Bare.

== Personal life ==
Leite is bisexual, and often deals with sexuality in her works.

== Filmography ==
=== Film ===
Year	Title	Director	Writer	Producer	Notes
2015	Bare	Yes	Yes	Yes	
2017	M.F.A.	Yes	No	No	
2019	Kiki and the Mxfits (short)	Yes	Yes	No	

=== TV ===
Year	Title	Role	Notes
2014–2016	Be Here Nowish	Nina	Also director, writer and producer
2021	Love Life	Director	Season 2
2022	Minx	Director	Season 1
2023	Black Cake	Director	Season 1, also Co-executive Producer
2022-2024	The Handmaid's Tale	Director	Season 3–5
2025	The Twisted Tale of Amanda Knox	Director	Miniseries
2026	The 'Burbs	Director	Season 1
2027	The Age of Innocence	Director	Miniseries
