= Rod Stryker =

American yoga and meditation teacher, author and speaker

- Born: Nimrod Andre Gross; October 19, 1957 (age 68)
- Occupation: Yoga teacher
- Years active: 1976–present
- Spouses: Cheryl Tiegs (m. 1998; div. 2001) Gina D'Orazio (m. 2006)
- Children: 4
- Parent(s): Joseph and Marion Gross

Rod Stryker (born Nimrod Andre Gross; October 19, 1957) is an American yoga and meditation teacher, author and speaker. He is the founder of ParaYoga, the author of The Four Desires: Creating a Life of Purpose, Happiness, Prosperity, and Freedom (2011 Random House). He has been teaching yoga since 1982. He is a former actor on the soap opera Capital and an actor in two 1980s action adventure shows (Riptide and The A-Team)

== Professional life ==
Raised in Los Angeles, California, Stryker attended Beverly Hills High School and the University of Denver, in addition to studying abroad. Stryker began studying and practicing yoga at the age nineteen. He taught his first class in 1980 and led his first teacher training in 1987. Following nearly two decades of study with Yoga master, Kavi Yogiraj Mani Finger and his son, Yogiraj Alan Finger he achieved the title Yogiraj, or master of Yoga. In 1999, Stryker was initiated into the tantric tradition of Sri Vidya, by his current teacher, Pandit Rajmani Tigunait, spiritual head of the Himalayan Institute. Stryker currently serves on the board of Give Back Yoga Foundation and is a featured faculty member of Yoga International.

Stryker founded ParaYoga, a Yoga Alliance Registered Yoga School, in the early 2000s. The name of the school was changed to Tantra Yoga Alchemy in 2024.

== Personal life ==
Stryker has been married twice. His first marriage (from 1998 to 2001) was to his private student, former supermodel Cheryl Tiegs. They had twin sons, Jaden and Theo, who were born via surrogacy in 2000. Stryker's marriage to Tiegs was mentioned in "The Negotiation", Season 3 Episode 18 of The Office. Stryker's second marriage (2006–present) is to Gina D'Orazio. The couple has two children. He is brother to ESPN mixed martial arts writer Josh Gross. He currently lives in Colorado.

== Works ==
=== Books ===
- Stryker, Rod (July 26, 2011). The Four Desires: Creating a Life of Purpose, Happiness, Prosperity, and Freedom. Delacorte Press. p. 400. ISBN 978-0-553-80398-3.
- Stryker, Rod (2015) The Four Desires Workbook: Creating a Life of Purpose, Happiness, Prosperity, and Freedom

=== CDs ===
- Meditations for Inner & Outer Peace (Audio, 76 minutes)
- Meditations for Life (Audio, 73 minutes)
- Relax Into Greatness (Audio, 88 minutes)
- Tantra: The Radiant Soul of Yoga (Audio 23-CD set)
- The Four Desires (Audio 2-CD Set)
