= Shayla Beesley =

American actress (born 1988)

- Occupation: Actress
- Years active: 2006–present

Shayla Beesley is an American actress best known for her role in the horror film Reaper.

== Biography ==
Beesley was born the oldest of four children to mother Tegan Ollie, a belly dancer who died in 2012, and father Graham Beesley. She lives in Hollywood, California. At age 7, she won a Young Authors Award and at 12 received 2nd place in a Veterans of Foreign Wars essay competition.

She grew up in Oak Harbor, Washington, and attended Oak Harbor High School where she took drama classes.

== Career ==
=== Film ===
In 2006, she played the lead female role in Perkins' 14, a horror film revolving around a group of brainwashed, bloodthirsty teenagers. The film was picked up by the Sci-Fi Channel. “Two of the actors cast through the online competition also hold their own and turn in very good work, particularly Shayla Beesley as Daisy Hopper,” Fangoria magazine reported. “The best part is that she elevates the role as written, which, if played by someone less talented, would’ve been a typical rebellious ‘Goth girl.’”

At 19, she starred as Audrey Shaw in her first feature film, Sex and the USA, previously titled Promises, which premiered at the Deauville American Film Festival in France on September 12, 2008.

In 2014, Beesley appeared in a lead role in Reaper with Danny Trejo and Vinnie Jones.

In March 2014, filming finished in Las Vegas for Death in the Desert, in which Beesley stars with Michael Madsen. The film is directed and produced by Josh Evans. She plays casino mogul Ted Binion's live-in girlfriend (named Kim in the film), alongside co-star Madsen, who plays Binion (renamed Ray for the film), with actress Paz de la Huerta as Kim's friend Margo. The film is inspired by the book Death in the Desert by author Cathy Scott with the screenplay by John Steppling.

=== TV ===
In 2008, she starred as Hayden Sayer in HBO's short film Trophy.

She appeared in the television series CSI: NY in a 2013 episode. She has appeared in several other TV series episodes, including Written by a Kid in 2012.

=== Video ===
She played a leading role in director Mike Diva's "Kill the Noise (Part 1)," which won MTV Clubland's Video of the Year award for 2012.

== External lists ==
- Shayla Beesley at IMDb
- Fears Magazine's Perkins' 14 review
