= Effort =

Effort may refer to:

- Effort, Pennsylvania, a census-designated place in Monroe County, Pennsylvania, United States
- Effortfulness, the subjective experience of exertion when performing an activity
- Effort (gamer), League of Legends pro-gamer

== See also ==
- Work (disambiguation)
- Second Effort, a 1968 film
- Effort heuristic, a rule of thumb to measure quality by effort
- Da Costa's syndrome, also known as Effort syndrome, a type of psychosomatic disorder
