= Lied Library =

Library at the University of Nevada, U.S.

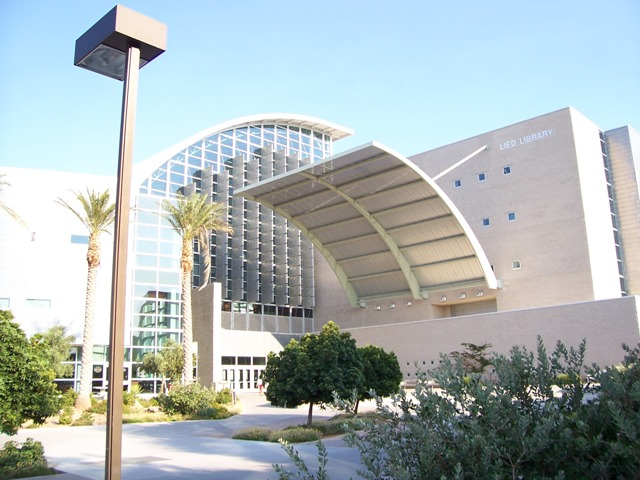
- Lied Library on the University of Nevada, Las Vegas campus
- 36.1072°N 115.1425°W
- Location: 4505 S Maryland Pkwy, Las Vegas, Nevada, United States, 89154
- Type: Academic library
- Established: January 8, 2001

Other information
- Website: www.library.unlv.edu

The Lied Library (/liːd/, LEED) is the main library of the University of Nevada, Las Vegas (UNLV), located on the university’s campus in Paradise, Nevada. It opened on January 8, 2001, and contains more than one million volumes across five floors.

The library is named for real-estate investor and developer Ernst Lied. The Lied Foundation Trust contributed more than $15 million toward its construction.

As of the 2023–2024 fiscal year, the libraries’ collection budget totaled $8.5 million.

== Media Distribution System ==
The Media and Computer Services Department at Lied Library operates the Safari integrated video network system, which supports delivery of analog and digital media to carrels, preview rooms, multimedia computers, classrooms, and conference rooms.

== Special Collections and Archives: Gaming ==
Special Collections and Archives maintain a collection of gaming materials, including books, periodicals, visual materials, and oral histories. The department also holds corporate archives from gaming companies such as Harrah's, MGM, Boyd Gaming, and Binion's Horseshoe.

Additional holdings include architectural drawings of historic and contemporary casinos and papers related to the design and construction of Las Vegas neon signs, many produced by the Young Electric Sign Company. These materials include sketches, designs, and photographs, some of which are represented in the Neon Museum collection.
