= Tom Everett Scott =

American actor (born 1970)

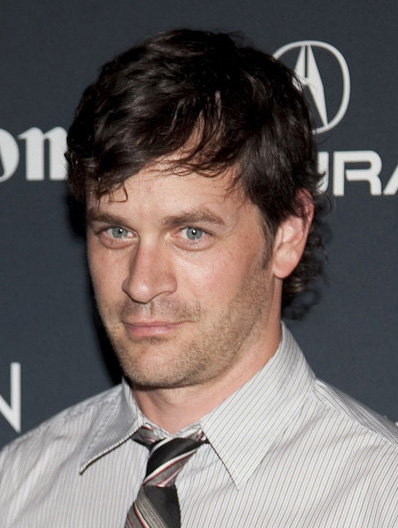
- Scott in 2010
- Born: Thomas Everett Scott; September 7, 1970 (age 56); East Bridgewater, Massachusetts, U.S.
- Education: Syracuse University
- Occupation: Actor
- Years active: 1993–present
- Spouse: Jenni Gallagher (m. 1997)
- Children: 2

Thomas Everett Scott (born September 7, 1970) is an American actor. His film work includes a starring role as drummer Guy Patterson in the film That Thing You Do!, the protagonist in An American Werewolf in Paris, and notable roles in Boiler Room, One True Thing, Dead Man on Campus, The Love Letter, Because I Said So, Danger One, La La Land, and Clouds.

In television, he played Detective Russell Clarke in the series Southland, Charles Garnett in Z Nation, and the recurring roles of Eric Wyczenski in ER, Sam Landon in Beauty & the Beast, Kevin Duval in the series Scream, William in Reign, Mr. Down in 13 Reasons Why, and Adam Fisher in The Summer I Turned Pretty. He also co-starred in the truTV sitcom I'm Sorry.

== Early life ==
Scott was born in East Bridgewater, Massachusetts, the son of Cynthia "Cindy" (née Pierce), an insurance sales representative, and William Joseph "Bill" Scott (died 2007), a civil engineer. He graduated from Syracuse University in 1992, where he started out as a communications major, but eventually majored in drama.

== Career ==
After appearing in an episode of Law & Order and a commercial for Crest toothpaste in 1993, Scott's first notable role was as Matthew for several seasons on the television situation comedy Grace Under Fire. He played the title character's illegitimate son, whom she had placed for adoption. In 1996, Scott landed the role of Guy Patterson in the film That Thing You Do! He was almost passed over because of his resemblance to the film's director, actor Tom Hanks, but Hanks' wife, Rita Wilson, encouraged Hanks to cast Scott in the role.

Scott has had several other roles; he was the lead in the films An American Werewolf in Paris and Dead Man on Campus, and co-starred with Kate Capshaw and Tom Selleck in The Love Letter. He starred in the cult film Boiler Room and made an uncredited cameo in Van Wilder. He played Bert Cates in the film Inherit the Wind (1999) with George C. Scott and Jack Lemmon. He has had recurring roles on the television series ER in 2002 and 2003 and has played numerous minor parts in other films and television shows such as Will & Grace and Sons of Anarchy. He co-starred in the series Philly as a lawyer, partnering with Kim Delaney. The show was a critical success, but suffered poor ratings and was cancelled after one season. He also starred in Saved, a medical drama series on TNT. He starred in the television film Surrender Dorothy. He appeared as one of Mandy Moore's character's boyfriends in the comedy Because I Said So, and starred in a Broadway theatre comedy, The Little Dog Laughed, as closeted film star Mitchell Green, written by Douglas Carter Beane. He starred as Jack Cutting on the ABC's brief comedy drama series Cashmere Mafia (2008). In 2009, he appeared in four episodes of Law & Order playing the fictional Governor of New York, Don Shalvoy. He also played Detective Russell Clarke in the seven episodes of the first season of Southland, which was dropped by NBC and subsequently picked up by TNT. At the start of the second season, he became a recurring character appearing in three of six episodes. In the third and fifth seasons, he continued to appear in selected episodes.

Scott had supporting roles in other films such as Race to Witch Mountain, Tanner Hall, Mars Needs Moms, Parental Guidance, Enemies Closer, Sister Cities, and portrayed an affable but amoral paramedic in Danger One. His former television roles include Sam Landon in Beauty and the Beast, Kevin Duval in Scream, Charles Garnett in Z Nation, and William in Reign. In 2016, he appeared in the film La La Land. In 2017, he co-starred in the film Diary of a Wimpy Kid: The Long Haul, and was a series regular on the TruTV sitcom I'm Sorry, starring alongside Andrea Savage for two seasons.

== Personal life ==
Scott married Jenni Gallagher, whom he met at Syracuse University, on December 13, 1997. They have two children.

== Filmography ==
=== Film ===
Year	Title	Role	Notes
1996	That Thing You Do!	Guy Patterson	
1997	An American Werewolf in Paris	Andy McDermott	
1998	One True Thing	Brian Gulden	
1998	Dead Man on Campus	Josh Miller	
1998	River Red	Dave Holden	Also producer
1999	The Love Letter	Johnny Howell	
1999	Top of the Food Chain	Guy Fawkes	
2000	Attraction	Garrett	
2000	Boiler Room	Michael Brantley	
2002	Van Wilder	Elliot Grebb	
2005	Sexual Life	Todd	
2006	Air Buddies	Buddy	Voice
2007	Because I Said So	Jason Grant	
2008	Snow Buddies	Buddy	Voice
2009	Race to Witch Mountain	Mr. Matheson	
2009	Tanner Hall	Gio	
2011	Mars Needs Moms	Milo's Dad	Voice
2012	Parental Guidance	Phil Simmons	
2012	Santa Paws 2: The Santa Pups	Santa Paws	Voice
2013	Enemies Closer	Park Ranger Henry Taylor	
2015	Bravetown	Jim	
2015	Forever	Fred	
2016	Pup Star	Charlie	Voice
2016	La La Land	David	
2016	Vanished – Left Behind: Next Generation	Damon	
2017	The Last Word	Ronald Odom	
2017	Diary of a Wimpy Kid: The Long Haul	Frank Heffley	
2017	Pup Star: Better 2Gether	Charlie	Voice
2018	Collusions	Martin	
2018	Danger One	Dean	
2018	Back Roads	Brad Mercer	
2019	I Hate Kids	Nick Pearson	
2020	Clouds	Rob Sobiech	
2020	Sister of the Groom	Ethan	
2021	Finding You	Montgomery Rush	
2023	One True Loves	Michael	
2024	Rockbottom	Jesse	
TBD	Rule of Three †	TBD	

Key
†	Denotes films that have not yet been released

=== Television ===
Year	Title	Role	Notes
1993	Law & Order	Charles Wilson	Episode: "Pride and Joy"
1994	CBS Schoolbreak Special	Matt Hansen	Episode: "Love in the Dark Ages"
1995–1997	Grace Under Fire	Matthew	5 episodes
1999	Inherit the Wind	Bertram Cates	Television film
2000–2001	The $treet	Jack T. Kenderson	12 episodes
2001–2002	Philly	Will Froman	Main role, 22 episodes
2002–2003	Do Over	Adult Joel Larsen	Voice, 13 episodes; uncredited
2002–2003	ER	Eric Wyczenski	8 episodes
2003	Will & Grace	Alex	Episode: "Strangers with Candice"
2004	Justice League Unlimited	Booster Gold	Voice, episode: "The Greatest Story Never Told"
2004	Karroll's Christmas	Allen Karroll	Television film
2005	Stacked	Gavin P. Miller	Episode: "Unaired Pilot"
2006	Saved	Wyatt Cole	Main role, 13 episodes
2008	Cashmere Mafia	Jack Cutting	3 episodes
2008	Sons of Anarchy	Rosen	3 episodes
2008–2009	Law & Order	Governor Donald Shalvoy	4 episodes
2009–2011	Batman: The Brave and the Bold	Booster Gold	Voice, 8 episodes
2009–2013	Southland	Detective Russell Clarke	Main role, 17 episodes
2010	The Devil's Teardrop	Parker Kincaid	Television film
2011	Bad Mom	Ted Lacey	Television film
2012	GCB	Andrew Remington	3 episodes
2013	Independence Daysaster	Sam Garsette	Television film
2013	Bloodline	Dr. Christopher Benson	Television film
2014	Love Finds You in Sugarcreek, Ohio	Joe Matthews / Micah Matthias	Television film
2014	Beauty and the Beast	Sam Landon	5 episodes
2014	Z Nation	Charles Garnett	6 episodes
2015	How to Get Away with Murder	Father Andrew Crawford	Episode: "The Night Lila Died"
2015	Criminal Minds	Greg Sullivan	Episode: "Beyond Borders"
2015–2016	Scream	Kevin Duval	6 episodes
2015–2016	Reign	William Cecil	6 episodes
2016	Elementary	Henry Baskerville	Episode: "Hounded"
2016	Sister Cities	Chief Barton Brady	Television film
2017–2019	13 Reasons Why	Mr. Down	8 episodes
2017	Christmas Connection	Jonathan Murphy	Television film
2017–2019	I'm Sorry	Mike Harris	Main role, 20 episodes
2019	God Friended Me	Paul Levine	Episode: "Prophet and Loss"
2020	The Healing Powers of Dude	Marvin Ferris	Main role
2020	Council of Dads	Scott Perry	Guest role
2021	Rise and Shine, Benedict Stone	Ben Stone	Television film
2021	The Good Father: The Martin MacNeill Story	Martin MacNeill	Television film
2022–2025	The Summer I Turned Pretty	Adam Fisher	Series regular
2022	Dolly Parton's Mountain Magic Christmas	Sam Heskel	Television film
2026	Elle	Wyatt Woods	Filming

=== Video games ===
Year	Title	Role
2004	Call of Duty: Finest Hour	
2010	Batman: The Brave and the Bold – The Videogame	Booster Gold

== Awards and nominations ==
Year	Award	Category	Nominated work	Result
1998	Stinkers Bad Movie Awards	Worst On-Screen Couple (shared with Mark-Paul Gosselaar)	Dead Man on Campus	Nominated
1999	Teen Choice Awards	Choice Hissy Fit	Dead Man on Campus	Nominated
2009	Tribeca Festival Awards	Best Narrative Short	Glock	Nominated
2017	Gold Derby Awards	Ensemble Cast (shared with the cast)	La La Land	Nominated
