= Die Trying (album) =

Studio album by Die Trying
- Released: June 10, 2003
- Recorded: November–December 2002
- Genre: Alternative metal, post-grunge, nu metal
- Length: 37:54
- Label: Island
- Producer: Neal Avron

Die Trying chronology
Sparrows EP (2002)	Die Trying (2003)	Die Young (demo) (2007)

Singles from Die Trying
- 1. "Oxygen's Gone" Released: April 29, 2003

Professional ratings
Review scores
Source	Rating
Allmusic	2/5 stars

Die Trying is the only studio album by rock band Die Trying. It was released through Island Records on June 10, 2003.

That year, Die Trying toured with the likes of Andrew W.K. and Hoobastank in promotion of the album.

== Single ==
"Oxygen's Gone" served as the album's only single. Its music video found significant airplay on Fuse TV and MTV2 during the summer of 2003. The band is seen performing in the city along with shots of young men freerunning across urban buildings and structures. Hoobastank vocalist Doug Robb, also employed by Island Records, makes a brief cameo appearance in a car that's leaped over by one of the men. Jacoby Shaddix of Papa Roach makes a cameo appearance in the video as well.

== Track listing ==
All music is composed by Die Trying.

No.	Title	Length
1.	"One Day at a Time"	3:19
2.	"Runaway"	2:32
3.	"Oxygen's Gone"	3:23
4.	"Turn Up the Radio"	3:34
5.	"Love and Guns"	2:58
6.	"Fuck You"	2:37
7.	"Dirty Dirty"	3:17
8.	"Conquer the World" (feat. Jacoby Shaddix)	2:48
9.	"Never Good Enough"	2:25
10.	"Words That Kill"	3:23
11.	"Die Trying"	3:21
12.	"So Long"	4:17
Total length:		37:54

== Personnel ==
- Jassen Jensen - vocals
- Jack Sinamian - guitars
- Matt Conley - drums
- Steve Avery - bass
- Jacoby Shaddix - guest vocals on "Conquer The World"
- Roxy Saint - guest vocals on "Dirty Dirty"
- Neal Avron – producer, engineer
- Jay Baumgardner – mixing
- Ryan Castle – assistant engineer
- Travis Huff – digital editing, pro-tools
- Louis Marino – art direction, design
- Phil Mucci – photography, cover photo
- Dean Nelson – assistant engineer

== Charts ==
Album - Billboard (North America)

Year	Chart	Position
2003	Heatseekers	14

Singles - Billboard (North America)

Year	Single	Chart	Position
2003	"Oxygen's Gone"	Mainstream Rock Tracks	35
2003	"Oxygen's Gone"	Modern Rock Tracks	29
