= Confil =

Wet-laid nonwoven fabric

Confil is a wet-laid nonwoven fabric made from a blend of polyester and cellulose. The International Paper Company acquired the manufacturing process from Feldmühle in 1968, and marketed Confil as a disposable fabric for domestic and hospital use. Although the product was too late to market to take advantage of the 1960s paper clothing fad, International Paper promoted it for general clothing use, positioning the product as superior to paper in feel and durability, but cheap enough to throw away. Despite limited adoption in the fashion industry, demand justified construction of a $16 million factory in Lewisburg, Pennsylvania to increase production volumes. As the price of cotton more than doubled during the 1970s, Confil found use in other specialty applications such as wallpaper, construction fabrics, and geotextiles. In the early 21st century, Confil is largely used in filtration media.
