= Die Trying (band) =

American rock band

- Origin: Sacramento, California, U.S.
- Genres: Post-grunge; alternative metal; nu metal
- Years active: 2001–2007
- Label: Island

Die Trying was a four-member rock band formed in 2001 and based in Sacramento, California.

After signing a contract with Island Records in 2002, they released their first single, "Oxygen's Gone", followed by their self-titled debut album on June 10, 2003.

== Discography ==
- Sparrows (EP) (2002)
- Die Trying (2003)
- Die Young (Demo Tape) (2007)

== Members ==
- Jassen Jensen – vocals
- Jack Sinamian – guitar
- Steve Avery – bass
- Matt Conley – drums
