= Paz de la Huerta =

American actress (born 1984)

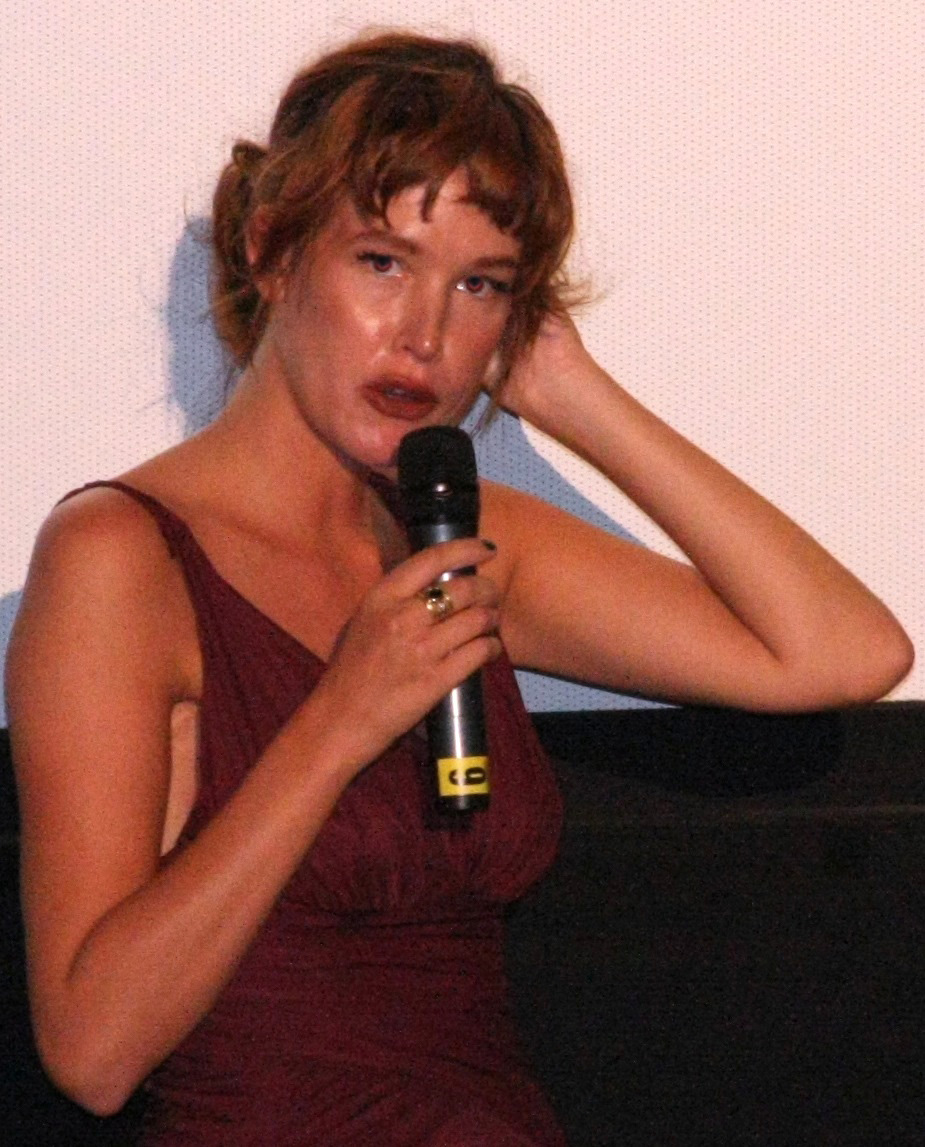
- De la Huerta in 2009
- Born: María de la Paz Elizabeth Sofía Adriana de la Huerta y Bruce; September 3, 1984 (age 42); New York City, U.S.
- Occupations: Actress; model; painter
- Years active: 1998–present

María de la Paz Elizabeth Sofía Adriana de la Huerta y Bruce (born September 3, 1984), known professionally as Paz de la Huerta (pronounced [paθ de la ˈweɾ.ta]), is an American actress, model and painter. She began her career as a teenage model before appearing in supporting roles in the films The Cider House Rules (1999) and A Walk to Remember (2002).

She had a lead role in Gaspar Noé's art film Enter the Void (2009), and subsequently played Lucy Danziger in the HBO period drama series Boardwalk Empire from 2010 to 2011. She also starred in the horror film Nurse 3D (2013).

== Early life ==
De la Huerta was born September 3, 1984 in New York City, the daughter of Spanish nobleman Don Ricardo Ignacio (Íñigo) Rafael de la Huerta y Ozores (14th Duke of Mandas and Villanueva, Grandee of Spain, born in San Sebastián on November 17, 1944) and wife Judith Bruce (born in Minneapolis, Minnesota, October 23, 1946). Her older sister, Doña Rafaela María de la Paz de la Huerta y Bruce (born in New York City on 15 November 1981), is the presumptive heiress of their father's titles. De la Huerta was born with recurrent cystic hygroma under her arm, which she has had treated with multiple surgeries. She and her older sister were raised by their mother in the SoHo neighborhood of Lower Manhattan. Her mother worked as an authority on birth control and women's issues in Third World countries. De la Huerta was raised a Roman Catholic, and has described herself as "very Catholic".

She attended the private Saint Ann's School in the New York City borough of Brooklyn on a scholarship, where she met fellow student and future fashion designer, Zac Posen, for whom she later became a muse. During this time she was a babysitter for Lexi Jones, daughter of David Bowie and Iman.

== Career ==
=== 1998–2009: Modeling and early work ===
She made her film debut with a small role in the 1998 romantic comedy The Object of My Affection. The next year, she appeared opposite Michael Caine and Charlize Theron in Lasse Hallström's The Cider House Rules (1999), a period drama adapted from John Irving's novel of the same name, in which she portrayed a young orphan. She next had a small role in the independent drama Looking for an Echo, followed by a minor appearance in Ethan Hawke's directorial debut, Chelsea Walls (2001).

De la Huerta subsequently starred in the ABC television film Bailey's Mistake (2001) opposite Linda Hamilton. Jonathan Storm of the Orlando Sentinel praised her performance in the film as "exquisite". In 2002, she appeared opposite Shane West and Mandy Moore in A Walk to Remember, an American coming-of-age romantic drama film based on the Nicholas Sparks novel of the same name.

In 2007, de la Huerta was cast in a lead role in Enter the Void (2009), a psychedelic melodrama set in neon-lit nightclub environments of Tokyo, in which she portrayed a troubled young woman whose brother is murdered by the local police. Director Gaspar Noé found her after holding auditions in New York City. "I met Paz and I really liked her. She had the profile for the character because she likes screaming, crying, showing herself naked - all the qualities for it."

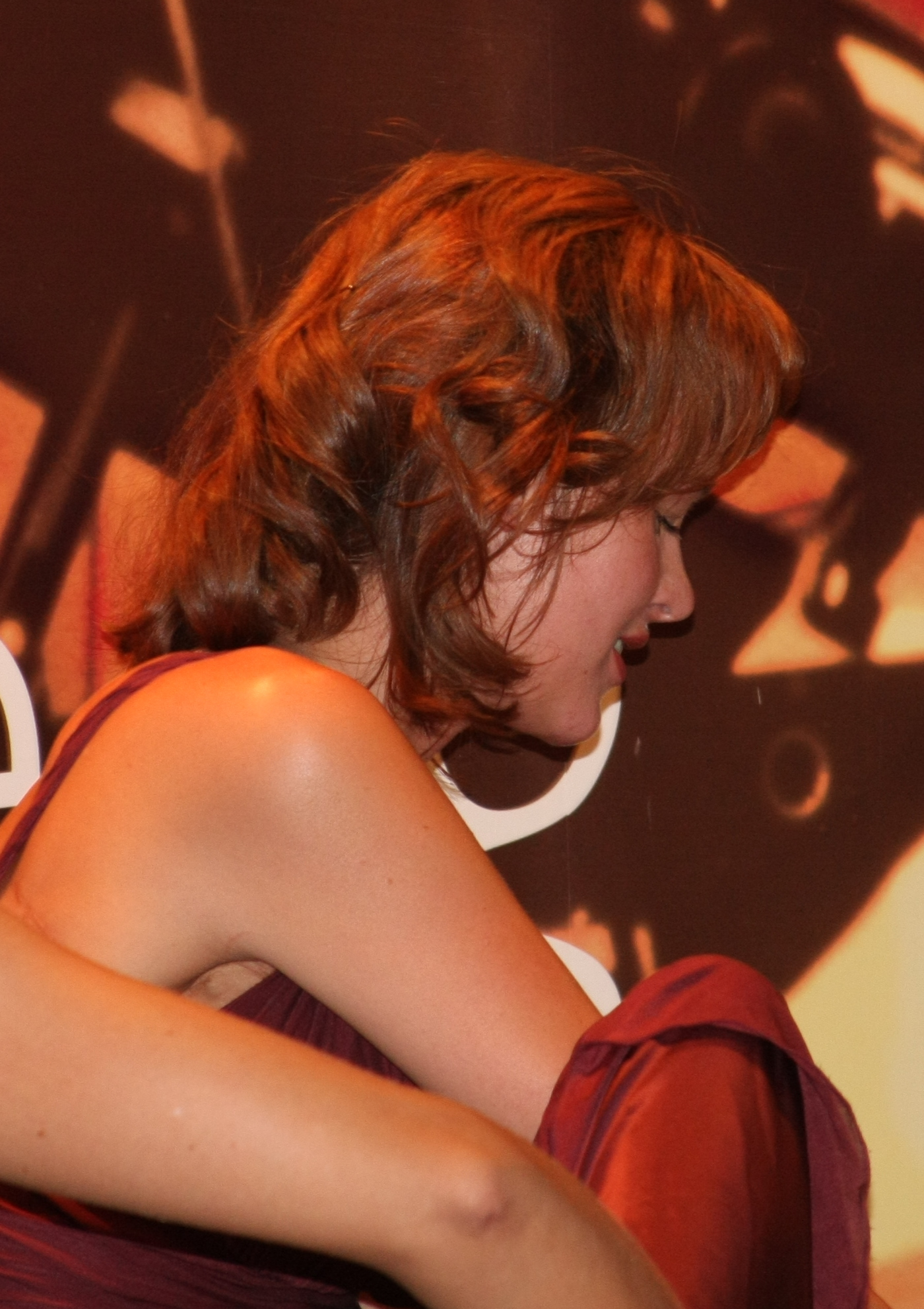
De la Huerta at the 2009 Toronto International Film Festival

The following year, she appeared in a supporting role opposite Sam Rockwell in the dark comedy Choke (2008), based on the novel of the same name by Chuck Palahniuk. In 2009, de la Huerta appeared in a supporting role in Jim Jarmusch's mystery film The Limits of Control.

=== 2010–present: Career expansion and later roles ===
In 2010, de la Huerta appeared in the HBO pilot Boardwalk Empire, set in Atlantic City during the Prohibition era, as Enoch "Nucky" Thompson's mistress, a former Ziegfeld Follies dancer. Boardwalk Empire was renewed for a second season, with de la Huerta returning as Lucy. Discussing the second season she said; "The first season was very different from the second season. With the first season, nobody really knew how the show was going to be received. With the second season, we had gotten lots of accolades and great reviews, so it was work, work, work, where we were shooting two episodes at a time." After the second season ended, de la Huerta and fellow co-stars Michael Pitt, Aleksa Palladino, and Dabney Coleman all departed the cast. In 2012, she commented on her departure from the series, stating she wanted to put her focus on other things. In 2013, she commented on how she would like to return to the hit series. "I’m still close with the producers. Terry (Terence Winter) always says it's possible for me to come back." Also adding; "I would love to come back with Lucy as a loving, doting mother."

In 2011, Lana Del Rey, an American singer, received widespread attention when the music video for her single "Video Games" became a viral internet sensation. The video—directed and edited by Del Rey—included paparazzi footage of de la Huerta falling down while intoxicated. When asked if she was upset about the video, de la Huerta stated, "No, no. I don't get hung up about anything really. That's insignificant. I didn't really care."

In July 2011, de la Huerta signed on to play Abby Russell, the protagonist in the horror film Nurse 3D. A sequel for Nurse had been rumored by de la Huerta on her Twitter page with her stating that Nurse 2 would start shooting soon. However, In 2015, it was reported that de la Huerta was suing the filmmakers, for ruining her career and injuring her when a speeding ambulance driven by a stunt driver struck her while shooting.

In 2014, she completed filming in Las Vegas for the movie Death in the Desert, cast as Margo and co-starring with Michael Madsen and Shayla Beesley. She also had a supporting role in the Canadian horror film The Editor. She later appeared in Louis Theroux's 2015 documentary My Scientology Movie when she "crashed" an interview.

The next year, de la Huerta played Pepper in the drama film Bare opposite Dianna Agron. The film follows a young woman living in a small desert town in Nevada, who becomes romantically involved with a female drifter who leads her into a life of drugs, stripping, and psychedelic spiritual experiences. Director Natalia Leite wanted to cast two women who were willing to be totally raw and exposed on camera in the leading roles. She stated: "I wanted to find two women who were very different from each other to put those two contrasting energies together." The film had a world premiere at the Tribeca Film Festival on April 19, 2015. Frank Scheck of The Hollywood Reporter wrote that de la Huerta was perfectly cast for her role as Pepper, though the film has a "mundane storyline". John Stewart of The Slanted wrote, "The film is an wonderful departure for Glee's Dianna Agron and her performance with Paz de la Huerta is sure to spark a lot more work in the future for both rising stars."

De la Huerta walked the runway for the Autumn 2026 Vivienne Westwood collection in March 2026.

== Artwork ==
In July 2024, de la Huerta, who began painting in her childhood, exhibited a collection of fourteen works at the Ruttkowski;68 contemporary art gallery in Paris, titled "El Valle de Lágrimas" (English: "The Valley of Tears"). The collection featured works completed in watercolor, ink, and oil resin. The paintings, often surrealist in nature, are also based on parts of de la Huerta's life. She described her paintings as "very Biblical" and influenced by her Catholic faith. Her work was exhibited at a Los Angeles art gallery in February 2025.

== Personal life ==
De la Huerta lived in New York City in an apartment on Gay Street, and then moved into an apartment adjacent to her mother in the Tribeca neighborhood. As of 2021, de la Huerta resided in a farmhouse "near Paris".

She has a cobra tattooed on one leg and a crown on an arm, the latter as a tribute to her lineage.

=== Legal and health issues ===
In April 2011, she was sued by MTV reality show actress Samantha Swetra after an altercation at a bar. De la Huerta was arrested, issued a desk appearance ticket, and released.

In July 2011, she pleaded guilty to harassment and, in exchange, misdemeanor charges against her were reduced to a non-criminal violation. A judge ordered her to complete 12 weeks of alcohol counseling, one day of community service, and to stay away from Swetra.

==== Abuse allegations ====
De la Huerta, at the height of the Me Too movement, said in an interview with Vanity Fair that movie mogul Harvey Weinstein raped her on two occasions in 2010, once after demanding to enter her apartment and have a drink, and once showing up after she had been subjected to repeated phone calls and was intoxicated. De la Huerta came forward to police in 2017, within the New York state statute of limitations for rape in the first degree, and the New York District Attorney's Office was considering bringing charges against Weinstein. While charges have yet to be filed in de la Huerta's case, Weinstein has been charged in New York with the rape of another woman. More than 75 women accused Weinstein of sexual abuse.

In November 2018, de la Huerta filed a $60 million lawsuit in Los Angeles Superior Court accusing Weinstein of raping her in 2010 and then embarking on a campaign of harassment that she contends damaged her career. "After Weinstein raped me for the second time I went to a journalist," de la Huerta said in a 2024 interview. "Shortly after that I got fired from Boardwalk Empire and was blackmailed into making this B movie called Nurse 3D. During the filming I was hit by a truck; an ambulance in one of the scenes piloted by a 'stunt driver' drove right into me." De la Huerta stated that she was hospitalized for over two years after being struck by the vehicle, and was subsequently "blackmailed" into taking 300 milligrams of Seroquel shortly before a subsequent court hearing.

In 2021, she ran away from her father in Madrid. In a 2024 interview, de la Huerta stated she is now living in hiding from her parents, of whom she accused of exploiting and harassing her: "I have nearly died many times. And guess what, now I want to expose it and all the abuse I have suffered at the hands of my family, which was basically Satanic ritual abuse. Satanic abuse is real, and I was a victim of it. I come from Spanish royalty, this is the thing. And they think they can get away with murder. Spain is kind of corrupt. I have evidence, and when I show people the things I've survived, they're like, 'How are you alive?'"

== Filmography ==
=== Films ===
Year	Title	Role	Notes	Ref.
1998	The Object of My Affection	13-year-old Sally		
1998	Luminous Motion	Beatrice		
1999	The Cider House Rules	Mary Agnes		
2000	Looking for an Echo	Nicole Delgado		
2001	Bailey's Mistake	Becca Donovan	Television film	
2001	Chelsea Walls	Girl		
2001	Riding in Cars with Boys	Phone call flirt		
2001	Salome		Short film, director	
2002	A Walk to Remember	Tracie		
2002	A Girl's Guide to the Galaxy	Maxie	Short film	
2003	Bringing Rain	Dakota Cunningham		
2003	Rick	Vicki		
2004	Homework	Sara		
2005	Steal Me	Lily Rose		
2005	Fierce People	Jilly		
2005	Pupa, Papa, Puta		Short film, director	
2006	Hollywood Dreams	Wedding guest		
2006	5up 2down	Allie		
2006	Nail Polish	Becky Burns		
2006	The Tripper	Jade		
2007	Anamorph	Young woman		
2007	Light and the Sufferer	Annette		
2007	Neal Cassady	Tonya Novak		
2008	The Guitar	Constance "Cookie" Clemente		
2008	Choke	Nico		
2008	Deception	List member #1		
2008	The Hairy Beast		Short film, director	
2009	The Limits of Control	Nude		
2009	Enter the Void	Linda		
2009	Nothing Personal	Tess	Short film	
2009	42 One Dream Rush	—N/a		
2011	4:44 Last Day on Earth	Woman on street		
2012	Getting High	Ally		
2012	30 Beats	Laura		
2013	Nurse 3D	Abby Russell		
2013	In the Woods	—N/a	Part of The Being Experience trilogy by Jennifer Elster	
2014	The Editor	Josephine Jardin		
2015	Bare	Pepper		
2015	The Girl Is in Trouble	Maria		
2015	Aimy in a Cage	Caroline		
2015	Death in the Desert	Margo		
2015	My Scientology Movie	Herself	Documentary film; cameo appearance	
2015	El Vallé de lagrimas		Short film, director	
2016	Streets of East L.A.	The Nun		
2017	A Midsummer Night's Dream	Hippolyta		
2019	Superstrata	Emily Faraday		
2020	Puppy Love	Carla		
2024	The Roots	Rose Miller		

=== Television ===
Year	Title	Role	Notes
2000	Law & Order	Chloe	Episode: "Loco Parentis"
2000	The Practice	Jenny Holbrook	Episode: "Black Widows"
2000	Law & Order: Special Victims Unit	Karen Raye	Episode: "Chat Room"
2008	X Femmes	Miss Lingerie	Episode: "Le bijou indiscret"
2010–2011	Boardwalk Empire	Lucy Danziger	Main cast (seasons 1–2); 13 episodes
2013	Eagleheart	Tess	2 episodes

=== Music videos ===
Year	Title	Artist	Notes
2007	"By the Time I Get Home There Won't Be Much of a Place for Me"	Grand National	
2011	"Video Games"	Lana Del Rey	Paparazzi footage
2025	"New Wave America"	The Hellp	
