= Cold North Killers: Canadian Serial Murder =

2012 book by Lee Mellor

- Author: Lee Mellor
- Cover artist: Jesse Hooper
- Language: English
- Genre: Non-fiction (True crime)
- Published: 3 March 2012
- Publisher: Dundurn Press
- Publication place: Canada
- Media type: Print (Paperback)
- Pages: 472
- ISBN: 9781459701243
- OCLC: 724670637
- Dewey Decimal: 364.152320971
- Followed by: Rampage: Canadian Mass Murder and Spree Killing
- Website: https://www.dundurn.com/books/Cold-North-Killers

Cold North Killers: Canadian Serial Murder is a 2012 Canadian non-fiction book written by Lee Mellor and published by Dundurn Press. It documents the lives of sixty Canadian serial killers, with the earliest being Edward H. Rulloff and the most recent being Russell Williams. The book uses Katherine Ramsland's interpretation of what constitutes a serial killer—someone who has killed at least two people on two occasions, and who attempted to or likely would have killed again—as outlined in her 2007 book The Human Predator. Cold North Killers' own definition of what constitutes a Canadian serial killer includes both Canadians who committed murder abroad (such as Keith Hunter Jesperson and Gordon Stewart Northcott) and non-Canadians who committed murder in Canada (like William Dean Christensen and Earle Nelson).

== Background ==
While bedridden with illness in 2009, Mellor occupied his time by writing a novel about an RCMP criminal profiler's hunt for a serial killer terrorizing Canada, but partway into the story, Mellor realized that he had very little knowledge of any actual Canadian serial killers beyond Clifford Olson, Paul Bernardo, Karla Homolka and Robert Pickton. While looking up other cases, Mellor, inspired by both the lack of a single comprehensive source regarding serial murder in Canada and the high-profile arrest of Russell Williams in 2010, decided to abandon his original idea for a book in favor of a new one, specifically an encyclopedia about serial homicide in Canada.

Mellor researched seventy-five cases for the book, but at the behest of the editors at Dundurn Press reduced the number of them included in it to sixty due to spatial constraints. Mellor later included two of the excised cases—the Montreal child murders of 1981–1992 and the "Headless Valley" murders 1908–1946—in the third issue of his online magazine Serial Killer Quarterly.

== Synopsis ==
Each of the book's four sections cover different aspects of serial murder, and are divided into chapters that are each about a different Canadian serial killer. In between each section are passages relating to Russell Williams, who was active and arrested in the same area where Mellor was residing while he was in the process of writing Cold North Killers.

The first section showcases four of Canada's earliest serial killers—Edward H. Rulloff, Joseph LaPage, Theodore Durrant, and Gordon Stewart Northcott—and then delves into the nature versus nurture debate by scrutinizing the lives of Russell Johnson, Doug Moore, Peter Woodcock and Clifford Olson. Modus operandi and signature crime are then discussed by looking into the crimes committed by Léopold Dion, William Patrick Fyfe, Earle Nelson, Serge Archambault, Sam Pirrera and William Dean Christensen, with victimology then being explored through examination of John Martin Crawford, Donald Sherman Staley and Allan Legere, as well as the unsolved Toronto gay village murders of 1967–1968 and the Highway of Tears murders of 1969–2011.

The next section begins with a focus on the three different categories of serial killer: organized, disorganized, and mixed (someone who displays both organized and disorganized traits). Angelo Colalillo and David Threinen are used as examples of organized offenders, Braeden Nugent and Carl Hall as examples of disorganized offenders, and Donald Armstrong and Danny Wood as examples of mixed offenders. Next, subcategories are explored, beginning with "visionary" killer Bruce Hamill followed by "missionary" killer Ronald Sears, and then the three varieties of "hedonist" killer; Henry Williams and Christian Magee are presented as instances of "hedonist-lust" killers, James Greenidge and Michael Wayne McGray as "hedonist-thrill" killers, and insurance fraudsters Charles Kembo and Sukhwinder Dhillon, "black widow" Melissa Ann Shepard, and baby farmers Lila and William Young as "hedonist-comfort" killers. After chapters on "power/control" killers David Snow and Keith Hunter Jesperson, the section concludes with passages on "angels of death" Thomas Neill Cream and Robert MacGregor.

The third section centres around techniques that are used by the authorities to help them investigate serial killers. Offender profiling was employed in the Brian Arp, Paul Bernardo, and the still unsolved Edmonton serial killer cases, while advances in DNA analysis resulted in cold case murders being positively attributed to Ronald West, Gerald Thomas Archer, and Alan Craig MacDonald. Crime-solving methods pioneered by Canada are then showcased; metal detectors were used to uncover Michael Vescio's discarded shell casings in what was the first instance of the devices being used to assist with a criminal investigation, while bite-mark analysis was used to help convict Wayne Boden in what was one of the earliest usages of forensic dentistry in North America. In 1998, Kim Rossmo used geographic profiling to discern the presence of a serial killer operating in Vancouver's Downtown Eastside. Rossmo's data, which the Vancouver Police Department refused to look into, was later vindicated by the arrest of Robert Pickton in 2002.

The first half of the book's final section is dedicated to discussing violence against Canadian sex workers, and how many of their deaths seemingly go unreported and under-investigated, possibly due to both their profession and the fact that many of them are Indigenous. The cases examined here are all unsolved ones, and include the Hemlock Valley murders of 1995, the Calgary prostitute murders of 1991–1993, the Prostitutes-in-the-Lake killings of 1994–1997, and the Niagara prostitute murders of 1995–2006. The second half of the section presents six cases (Karla Homolka, Allan Sweeney, Melvin Stanton, Paul Cecil Gillis, Michael Hector, and Gilbert Paul Jordan) that Mellor regards as having been notably "botched" in some way, such as through investigative, judicial, or bureaucratic incompetence, apathy, or red tape. The concluding chapter consists of brief write-ups on Noel Winters, Allan George Foster, Paul Alan Hachey, Raymond Russell, Donald Falkner, Davey Mato Butorac, Camille Cléroux, Cody Legebokoff, and Mark Garfield Moore, all offenders who did not receive longer entries in the book due to either a lack of easily accessible information about their crimes, or because the murders that they committed were only unearthed while the book was undergoing its final editing phase.

== Controversy ==
The Vancouver Public Library sent their copy of Cold North Killers to the hate-speech squad at the Vancouver Police Department for analyses in 2013 after receiving complaints about its content from a concerned citizen, who wrote, "There is no educational benefit in introducing a 10-year-old child who might pick this book up... to the ideas contained in it." The authorities concluded that there was nothing illegal about the book's content, and the Vancouver Public Library subsequently issued the formal statement, "This work is disturbing to read, but this does not affect the library's obligation to protect the right of a citizen to read this book."
