= Crime Stories (American TV program) =

American documentary television program

- Starring: Bill Courage, Richard Belzer
- Country of origin: United States
- No. of episodes: 67

Original release
- Network: Court TV (1998–2008); TruTV (2008–2010)
- Release: January 8, 1998 – December 2010

Crime Stories is an American documentary crime television program that was broadcast on Court TV/TruTV from January 8, 1998, to December 2010. The program was hosted by Bill Courage and Richard Belzer, and featured the investigation of crimes, including the apprehension of suspects and the subsequent interviewing by police and the trial of the suspects, whilst exploring the complexities of the American legal system.

== Episodes ==
=== Season 1 ===
- 1. Al Capone
- 2. Adolf Eichmann
- 3. Jeffrey MacDonald
- 4. John Wayne Gacy
- 5. Jimmy Hoffa
- 6. Scottsboro Boys
- 7. Sam Sheppard
- 8. Chicago Eight
- 9. Albert DeSalvo
- 10. John Gotti
- 11. Sante Kimes
- 12. Ted Bundy
- 13. Charles Manson

=== Season 2 ===
- 1. Allan Legere
- 2. Terry Driver
- 3. David Snow
- 4. Wayne Boden
- 5. David Shearing
- 6. Peter John Peters

=== Season 3 ===
- 1. Colin Thatcher
- 2. Michael Wayne McGray
- 3. Tien Poh Su
- 4. Marcello Palma
- 5. Russell Maurice Johnson
- 6. John Martin Crawford
- 7. David Milgaard
- 8. William Patrick Fyfe

=== Season 4 ===
- 1. Gary Alan Walker
- 2. Ray and Faye Copeland
- 3. Morris Solomon Jr.
- 4. Dorothea Puente
- 5. Robert Hansen
- 6. Ángel Reséndiz

=== Season 5 ===
- 1. Ivan Milat
- 2. John Ausonius
- 3. Richard Ramirez
- 4. David Alan Gore
- 5. Dean Corll
- 6. Leonard Fraser

=== Season 6 ===
- 1. Murder of Anita Cobby
- 2. Gerald and Charlene Gallego
- 3.Dennis Rader
- 4. Murder of Eric Wong
- 5. Murder of Katie Collman
- 6. Murder of Helle Crafts
- 7. Edward Delon Warren

=== Season 7 ===
- 1. John Edward Robinson
- 2. Keith Jesperson
- 3. Murder of Tara Lynn Grant
- 4. Madalyn Murray O'Hair
- 5. Cary Stayner
- 6. Thomas Lee Dillon
- 7. Richard Boggs
- 8. Helge Fossmo
- 9. Murder of Raymond Collin
- 10. Novi Ligure murder

=== Season 8 ===
- 1. Murder of Cindy Zarzycki
- 2. Lita McClinton
- 3. Jurijus Kadamovas and Iouri Mikhel
- 4. Robert Spangler
- 5. Murder of Pamela George
- 6. Murder of Clarence Pellet
- 7. Kristen Gilbert
- 8. Murder of Reena Virk

=== Season 9 ===
- 1. Murder of Arletha Hopkins
- 2. Gary Evans
- 3. Kendall Francois
- 4. Murder of Bruce Firman
- 5. Murder of Erin Chorney
- 6. Murder of Katherine Foster
- 7. Stacey Castor
- 8. Paul Durousseau
- 9. Murder of Kathy Odom
- 10. Murder of Susan McFarland

=== Season 10 ===
- 1. Derrick Todd Lee
- 2. Earl Bramblett
- 3. Bruce Mendenhall
- 4. Elias Abuelazam
- 5. Murder of Anita Spearman
- 6. Thomas Capano
- 7. Danny Wolfe
- 8. Anthony and Nathaniel Cook
- 9. Sebastian Burns and Atif Rafay
- 10. Murder of Jaime Wheeler
