= Waypoint (disambiguation) =

A waypoint is an intermediate point or place on a route or line of travel, a stopping point or point at which course is changed.

Waypoint may also refer to:

- Waypoint, a defunct online property of Vice Media
- Waypoint Centre for Mental Health Care, a mental health hospital in Canada
