= Melissa Ann Shepard =

Canadian criminal

- Born: Melissa Ann Russell; May 16, 1935 (age 91); Burnt Church, New Brunswick, Canada
- Known for: Manslaughter, fraud

Melissa Ann Shepard (née Russell; born May 16, 1935), also known as Melissa Ann Weeks, Melissa Ann Friedrich, Melissa Ann Shephard and Melissa Ann Stewart, sometimes given the sobriquet of Internet Black Widow, is a Canadian murderer and habitual offender. Shepard has been convicted of manslaughter in the death of one of her husbands, convicted of poisoning another, and convicted of numerous fraud offenses.

== Legal history ==
According to The Washington Post, Shepard's first husband, Russell Shepard, was her only husband not to "become [a victim] of a methodical, practiced ruse". This marriage ended in divorce. From 1977 to 1991, she served prison sentences for more than 30 convictions of fraud.

In 1992, Shepard was convicted of manslaughter of Gordon Stewart, her 44-year-old second husband, after running him over twice with a car in 1991. He had tranquilizers in his system at the time. She told police that he had raped her and that she ran him over while trying to escape. She was sentenced to six years in prison but was released early on good behaviour, serving just two years. Following her release, she toured the country, giving speeches on battered woman syndrome and killing in self-defense. She received a government grant to help others. During her tenure as a speaker, she sued journalist Barb McKenna of the Canadian newspaper The Guardian for writing an article in which she doubted Shepard's claims.

In 2000, Shepard married American Robert Friedrich, her third husband, shortly after meeting him online through a Christian dating site. He died 14 months later, leaving her with tens of thousands of dollars in assets. His sons made a criminal complaint against her, alleging that she caused his death by overdosing him with prescription medicine. She was never charged with a crime related to his death, but his sons later won back $15,000.

In 2005, she settled with a man that she met online in Pinellas Park, Florida. The man's son alerted police after his father was hospitalized a half-dozen times and he noticed unusual activity in his bank account. Hospital tests showed the man tested positive for tranquilizers but police could not prove she poisoned him; they instead charged her with grand theft, forgery and using a forged document, to which she pleaded guilty. She was sentenced to five years in prison.

In 2012, she was charged with attempted murder of Fred Weeks, her fourth husband, and after pleading guilty to lesser charges, she was sentenced to three and a half years in prison. Police found a substantial drugs stockpile (primarily lorazepam and temazepam) together with prescriptions from five different doctors and several sets of identity documents in different names among her possessions. Chief Justice Joseph Phillip Kennedy, sentencing, said: "People who have contact with this lady should be careful." On March 18, 2016, Melissa was released in Truro, Nova Scotia on a number of strict conditions. Halifax Regional Police released that she would be residing in the Halifax area, and that she had been assessed and found to be at a high risk to reoffend.

On April 11, 2016, Shepard was seen at the Halifax Central Library accessing the internet by a community response officer and was found with a device capable of accessing the internet during this incident, which were breaches of the release conditions she received a month before. She was charged with breaching the terms of her release. On August 4, her lawyer entered not guilty pleas for three counts of breaching a recognizance, including a ban on accessing the internet, on her behalf. Her trial was set to begin February 1, 2017, but the charges were dropped on December 22, 2016.

== In popular culture ==
After being released from prison in 1994, Friedrich appeared in the documentary When Women Kill and was interviewed by Peter Gzowski.

In 2012, she was the subject of an episode of CBC's the fifth estate, titled "The Widow's Web".

She was featured on the Investigation Discovery channel series Deadly Women in Season 8, Episode 11 "For the Money, Honey."

In 2017, she was also the subject of an episode of the Investigation Discovery channel series Web of Lies.

Author Lee Mellor (who appeared as a guest commentator in the Deadly Women episode "For the Money, Honey") included a passage on Shepard in his 2012 book Cold North Killers: Canadian Serial Murder, where he posited that Shepard is Canada's only known example of a "black widow"-type serial killer.
