= Morris Solomon Jr. =

American serial killer (1944–2024)

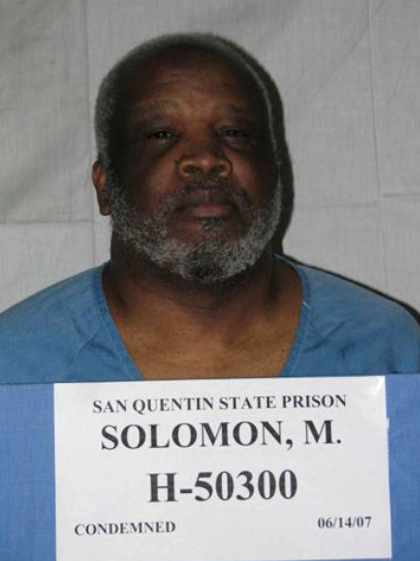
- Solomon's mugshot, 2007
- Born: March 15, 1944; Albany, Georgia, U.S.
- Died: August 1, 2024 (aged 80); Stockton, California U.S.
- Other name: The Sacramento Slayer
- Convictions: First degree murder with special circumstances (4 counts); Second degree murder (2 counts); Rape; Forcible oral copulation Forcible sodomy
- Penalty: Death

Details
- Victims: 7 (6 convictions)
- Span of crimes: June 1986 – April 1987
- Country: United States
- State: California
- Date apprehended: April 22, 1987
- Imprisoned at: San Quentin State Prison

Morris Solomon Jr. (March 15, 1944 – August 1, 2024), known as The Sacramento Slayer, was an American convicted serial killer on death row in San Quentin, California for the murders of six women.

== Early life ==
Solomon was born on March 15, 1944. Relatives and friends described Solomon's upbringing in rural Georgia as abusive. He was raised primarily by his grandmother, Bertha, who beat him and his brother daily for infractions such as bed wetting, mispronouncing words, or crying during a beating. Sometimes, she hit them for no apparent reason.

When Solomon was very young, Bertha beat him by laying him over her lap and hitting him repeatedly. She made him remove all his clothing and stand on a stool in the corner, where she beat his bare body, including his genitalia, with an electrical cord or switches she made him bring to her. Bertha sometimes beat him until he bled. Once, she tied his hands around the pole of a bed with an extension cord to keep him from backing away from her during a beating.

Solomon had little contact with his parents for the first 13 years. He was reunited with them when Bertha and the family moved to Isleton, a small farming town 40 miles south of Sacramento. They were among a handful of black families living in a poor, rundown section of the town known as "Cannery Row" or "Tinpan Alley."

His parents frequently beat and sexually assaulted one another in front of him. His mother and grandmother often beat him and verbally abused him in public. Friends and relatives would later describe his mother as a "loose woman" who regularly "entertained" different men.

After high school, he attended community college and worked various jobs, including carpentry, car repair, and bus driving.

He joined the army and was discharged as a sergeant. While in the army, he served in Vietnam during the Vietnam War for one year, starting in the summer of 1966. He returned to Isleton after his tour of duty ended in the summer of 1967. During this time, he became engaged to a woman he had known before going to Vietnam. When she broke the engagement, he relocated to the San Francisco Bay Area, married, and fathered a daughter. After he and his wife divorced, he moved back to Sacramento, where he found employment as a handyman.

In Solomon's appeal, his lawyer said his client had abused civilians in Vietnam:

"Young prostitutes were available to soldiers in Vietnam every day and everywhere, including combat zones, at bargain basement rates and with the blessing of the Army. The soldiers, including Morris, commonly viewed and treated the young women as sub-human and permissible objects of exploitation and debasement."

== The victims ==
- Yolanda Johnson (22) – found June 18, 1986.
- Angela Polidore (25) – found July 20, 1986.
- Maria Apodaca (18) – found March 19, 1987.
- Cherie Washington (26) – found April 20, 1987.
- Linda Vitela (24) – found April 22, 1987. She had been dead for about a year.
- Sheila Jacox (17) – also found April 22, 1987, and had likewise been dead for about a year.
- Sharon Massey (29) – found April 29, 1987, and had been dead for around 6 months.

== Investigation ==
The investigation began with a report to police of the discovery of Yolanda Johnson's body. The report was made by Solomon. Johnson, a drug user and a prostitute, had been bound and was found partially nude. Apodaca, also a drug user and a prostitute, was bound and buried wrapped up in bedding. Polidore was bound and partially nude. Washington, a prostitute and possibly a drug user, may have been bound and wrapped up in bedding. Vitela, a drug user and prostitute, was nude and wrapped in bedding. This was also true of Jacox. Massey, possibly a drug user and prostitute, was bound, nude, and wrapped in bedding. These common factors were interpreted by police to mean they were dealing with only one killer.

Solomon possibly took the initiative to report Johnson's body in order to appear innocent. Police questioned him after this discovery and he gave fingerprints and a blood sample, but he gave several inconsistent statements and he failed to properly identify himself. He was questioned a second time after Apodaca's body was discovered and gave false statements to police but later explained that he was concerned about outstanding misdemeanor warrants.

On April 20, 1987, he gave police permission to search his (abandoned) car on a lot where he lived. When they were at the premises, police noted a depression in the soil, borrowed a shovel, excavated and discovered Washington's body. On April 22, 1987, police discovered Vitela's and Jacox's bodies buried at a residence associated with Solomon. He was arrested. Police found Massey's body on the same lot where Apodaca's had been found.

In the course of their investigation police had discovered that Solomon had said to a third party that he would kill Johnson over the theft of some stereo equipment and that Apodaca had visited him at his residence several times. It was also indicated that the sheet in which Apodaca's body was wrapped came from his bed, and that Washington had been seen following him into his bedroom.

== Trial and sentencing ==
The prosecution case was largely circumstantial, because there was no evidence directly connecting Solomon with the crimes. Witness testimony connected him as an acquaintance of some of the victims. Tellingly, in all but one case the victims were found at locations where Solomon had either lived or had worked as a handyman. Although police had a blood sample, DNA testing was in its infancy and no connection was made by means of that technology. However, a semen sample had been collected from Johnson's body and it was determined to be consistent with Solomon's blood.

During the trial, defense attorneys Peter P. Vlautin III and Constance Gutowsky presented an extensive case in mitigation; 18 witnesses testified over the course of seven days.

The defense case largely attempted to show that the defendant's crimes stemmed from psychopathology born from the abuse he suffered as a child, compounded by his tour of duty in Vietnam and his cocaine use. Clinical forensic psychologist Brad Fisher and clinical psychologist John P. Wilson both testified that the abuse Solomon suffered as a child led to mental, emotional, and behavioral problems that were strongly linked to his crimes.

Solomon was convicted of six of the murders; the charges were dropped with respect to the Polidore murder.

=== Penalty phase ===
Solomon's first death penalty phase was declared a mistrial, though a second jury voted unanimously to put him to death in July 1992. When news about the case was made public, Solomon's surviving victims came forward and testified about their experiences. The following summarizes these incidents.

- Mary K. (18) testified about having been knifed September 19, 1969.
- Virginia J. (20s) testified to having been grabbed from behind, threatened with a gun, forced into a car and subjected to sexual assault and rape January 12, 1971.
- Dale W. testified that Solomon kicked her in the face (for which he was subsequently convicted of assault and intent to commit rape) on May 17, 1971.
- Connie S. testified that Solomon pulled a chain over her neck, choked her to unconsciousness, urinated on her face, assaulted and raped her on October 18, 1975. He was convicted of aggravated assault and false imprisonment.
- Darlene G. (18) testified that she was choked to unconsciousness in December 1976. Solomon was convicted of assault with intent to commit rape and false imprisonment. This happened at San Quentin State Prison, where he worked as a forklift operator.

Solomon had also been convicted of three counts of grand theft in 1984 in Arizona.

The second jury at the penalty phase unanimously decided on the death penalty and the decisions in this case were affirmed by the California Supreme Court. Solomon was the 342nd person to receive the death sentence in California and was on death row in San Quentin, California. His conviction was affirmed by the California Supreme Court on July 15, 2010.

Solomon died at California Health Care Facility in Stockton, California, on August 1, 2024, at the age of 80.

== Media ==
A documentary of Solomon's serial crimes appeared on the criminal documentary, Crime Stories on Discovery Channel and Biography Channel, featuring Antonio Harvey, a journalist/author, retired Sacramento police detective John Cabrera and former Sacramento Bee photographer Tom Parker.

In 2018 another documentary series "35 Serial Killers the World Wants To Forget" has also covered this case in their fourth episode featuring Antonio Harvey and John Cabrera.

Harvey, a northern California political/sports reporter and journalism graduate from Sacramento State University, completed a detailed true crime novel on Solomon's case. Harvey's book is titled, The Homicidal Handyman of Oak Park.

As of 2016, Harvey announced that he was working on a screenplay based on Solomon's case and hopes to release an updated version of the book since acquiring additional information.

== See also ==
- List of serial killers in the United States
