= Ghost Town Heart =

Studio album by Lee Mellor
- Released: 2007
- Recorded: September 2006–June 2007
- Genre: Alt-country
- Producer: Paul Johnston/Lee Mellor

Ghost Town Heart is the debut album of Canadian alt-country/folk singer Lee Mellor, produced by Paul Johnston and Lee Mellor. It was officially released in Toronto on August 18, 2007, and on September 7 in Montreal. The album has been praised for its lyrics in both the independent and mainstream media.

== Track listing ==
All songs written by Lee Mellor

1. "Liberty Street" – 4:21
2. "The Greatest Killer in a Small Town" – 3:08
3. "Nowhere, Manitoba" – 5:43
4. "Gravedigger Blues" – 3:50
5. "Girl on the Highway" – 6:00
6. "Ain't No Whiskey" – 3:53
7. "St. Lawrence River" – 6:06
8. "Bar Mirror" – 4:18
9. "Big Rusty Hammer" – 4:33
10. "Tumbleweed" – 2:20
11. "Jessie Hynes" – 2:27
12. "Blow My Heart Out of the Night" – 4:23
