= Shanna Hogan =

American writer (1982–2020)

- Born: October 21, 1982; Olathe, Kansas, U.S.
- Died: September 1, 2020 (aged 37); Phoenix, Arizona, U.S.
- Education: Arizona State University
- Occupations: Journalist, author
- Agent: Martin Literary Management
- Notable credit(s): Guest, The View
- Title: Picture Perfect
- Spouse: Matt LaRussa
- Children: Son, Zander
- Website: shannahogan.com

Shanna Hogan (October 21, 1982 – September 1, 2020) was an American non-fiction author and journalist. She was best known for writing the book Picture Perfect about convicted murderer Jodi Arias.

== Early life ==
Born in Olathe, Kansas, Hogan grew up in Phoenix, Arizona. In 2005, she graduated with a bachelor's degree in journalism from Arizona State University.

== Career ==
She was a reporter at the East Valley Tribune from 2004 to 2007. In 2008, she went to work for the Times Media Group as a features editor, where in 2012 she was promoted to executive editor.

Hogan wrote four true crime books, with her first, Dancing with Death, about Phoenix housewife Marjorie Orbin and the death of her husband Jay, an art dealer, released by St. Martin's Press in 2011. It was followed by Picture Perfect: The Jodi Arias Story, released in September 2013 by St. Martin's True Crime Library about the Travis Alexander murder in Mesa, Arizona. A third book, The Stranger She Loved, was released by St. Martin's in March 2015, about the murder of Utah doctor Martin MacNeil's wife, Michele, and his 2013 conviction. Her fourth book, Secrets of a Marine's Wife, released by St. Martin's in February 2019, is about the 2014 murder of 19-year-old pregnant Marine wife Erin Corwin.

Hogan appeared on Dateline NBC, 20/20, Anderson Cooper 360°, Inside Edition, and Oxygen's Snapped to discuss high-profile crime cases. She also appeared on Jane Velez-Mitchell Dr. Drew On Call, and multiple crime shows on the Investigation Discovery channel. On January 10, 2014, she was on The View with attorney and correspondent Darren Kavinoky in a panel discussion of the Jodi Arias case.

In 2017, Hogan co-authored The Crime Book volume with American crime writers Lee Mellor, Rebecca Morris, Cathy Scott, and British author Michael Kerrigan, with a foreword for the U.S. edition by Scott and the U.K. edition by author Peter James. It was released in April 2017 in the UK and May 2017 in the US by Dorling Kindersley (Penguin Random House).

In March 2019, Hogan co-hosted with editor Charlie Spicer the first series of the true-crime podcast Case Closed from Macmillan Books, featuring the case of murder victim Erin Corwin.

== Awards ==
Hogan was awarded the 2009 Arizona Press Club's Virg Hill Journalist of the Year. She was also awarded "Journalist of the Year 2011" by the Arizona Newspaper Association.

Hogan's book, Picture Perfect, debuted the week of September 22, 2013, at number 16 on The New York Times bestseller list for e-book nonfiction and combined print and e-book nonfiction the same week at number 23.

== Personal life ==
Hogan lived in Phoenix with her husband, Matt LaRussa, and son Zander. She was an adjunct professor at the Walter Cronkite School of Journalism and Mass Communication at Arizona State University.

== Death ==
She died on September 1, 2020, after a five-day hospital stay. She had fallen in her swimming pool while playing with her son on August 27, and hit her head. Her husband found her unconscious, though their son, who was wearing a flotation device, was fine.

== Books ==
- Dancing with Death (2011) (ISBN 978-0312532284)
- Picture Perfect (2013) (ISBN 978-1250049452)
- The Stranger She Loved (2015) (ISBN 9781250057501)
- The Crime Book (co-author) (2017) (ISBN 978-1465462862)
- Secrets of a Marine's Wife (2019) (ISBN 978-1250127303)
