= Peter Woodcock =

Canadian serial killer and child rapist (1939–2010)

David Michael Krueger
- Woodcock in 1957
- Born: Peter Woodcock; March 5, 1939; Peterborough, Ontario, Canada
- Died: March 5, 2010 (aged 71); Penetanguishene, Ontario, Canada
- Status: Deceased

Details
- Victims: 4
- Span of crimes: 1956 – 1957; 1991
- Country: Canada
- Date apprehended: January 21, 1957

David Michael Krueger (March 5, 1939 – March 5, 2010), best known by his birth name Peter Woodcock, was a Canadian serial killer, child rapist and diagnosed psychopath. He gained notoriety for the murders of three young children in Toronto in the late 1950s, as well as for a murder in 1991 on his first day of unsupervised release from the psychiatric institution in which he had been incarcerated for his earlier crimes.

An adopted child, Krueger lived in numerous foster homes as an infant and showed signs of severe emotional trauma when he found a permanent foster home at the age of 3. Unable to adjust to social situations, he was bullied by his peers. Krueger would often wander from his home by foot, bicycle or train to parts of Toronto, where he would molest dozens of children and ultimately murder three. Found not guilty by reason of insanity, he was sent to a psychiatric facility. Psychiatrists placed him in experimental treatment programs for psychopathy, but those treatments proved ineffective when he murdered a fellow psychiatric patient in 1991; after his death in 2010, he was described in the Toronto Star as "the serial killer they couldn't cure."

== Early life ==
Peter Woodcock was born in Peterborough, Ontario, to a 17-year-old factory worker, Waita Woodcock, who gave him up for adoption after breastfeeding him for a month. Adoption agency records report that the newborn showed feeding problems and cried constantly. As an infant, he stayed in various foster homes, unable to bond with any of his foster parents. After his first birthday, he became terrified of anybody approaching him, and his speech was incoherent—described as strange whining animal noises. He was also physically abused by at least one of his early foster parents, with a 2-year-old Woodcock having to be given medical treatment for an injured neck after receiving a beating. He was placed into a stable home at the age of 3 with foster parents Frank and Susan Maynard, an upper-middle-class couple with another son. Susan Maynard, who was described as a "forceful woman with an exaggerated sense of propriety", became strongly attached to the maladjusted child, who would still scream when someone approached him. By the age of 5, Woodcock remained socially maladjusted and became the target of neighbourhood bullies.

Worried about the child's fragile emotional state, Frank and Susan Maynard would regularly bring him to the Hospital for Sick Children, where Woodcock received extensive treatment. Woodcock was sent to a private school, but again failed to make friends and remained isolated. By the age of 11, he was described as an "angry little boy"; a Children's Aid Society report on him from that time read:

Slight in build, neat in appearance, eyes bright, and wide open, worried facial expression, sometimes screwing up of eyes, walks briskly and erect, moves rapidly, darts ahead, interested and questioning constantly in conversation ... He attributes his wandering to feeling so nervous that he just has to get away. In some ways, Peter has little capacity for self-control. He appears to act out almost everything he thinks and demonstrates excessive affection for his foster mother. Although he verbalizes his resentment for other children, he has never been known to physically attack another child ... Peter apparently has no friends. He plays occasionally with younger children, managing the play. When with children his own age, he is boastful and expresses determinedly ideas which are unacceptable and misunderstood.

Signs of Woodcock's violent fantasies were present at this time also, seen when a social worker was walking with him at the Canadian National Exhibition and Woodcock muttered, "I wish a bomb would fall on the Exhibition and kill all the children". Woodcock was sent to a school for emotionally disturbed children in Kingston, Ontario, and began acting on his strong sexual urges with other children—with Woodcock stating that here he had consensual intercourse with a 12-year-old girl when he was 13. When he turned 15, he was discharged from this school and returned to live with his foster parents, but was soon re-enrolled at his original private school, where he again failed to connect with his peers. At the age of 16, he left the private school again and was sent to a public high school, where children from the neighborhood instantly recognized him and resumed the bullying; he transferred to a private high school six weeks later. While his peers again shunned him, his teachers remembered him as a very bright student who excelled in science, history, and English, and who frequently scored 100 percent on his tests.

== Early crimes ==
Peter Woodcock's prized possession was a red and white Schwinn bicycle on which he satisfied his continuing compulsion to wander. He rode the bike to the far reaches of the city—and evolved a fantasy in which he led a gang of 500 invisible boys on bikes called the 'Winchester Heights Gang'. His foster parents were aware of this fantasy and his compulsion to wander, but they were unaware that he had begun travelling around Toronto on his bike and sexually assaulting children.

=== Murder of Wayne Mallette ===
On September 15, 1956, 17-year-old Woodcock was riding his bike around the grounds of the Exhibition Place when he met 7-year-old Wayne Mallette. He lured the boy out of sight and then proceeded to strangle him to death. Mallette's body was found in the early hours of September 16. It appeared that his clothing had been removed and he had then been re-dressed. His face was pushed into the dirt and two bite marks were found on the body—one on the boy's calf and the other on his buttock. There was no evidence of rape, however. Pennies were found scattered near the body. Woodcock had defecated next to the victim as well.

Toronto Police initially arrested and interrogated another boy, Ron Moffatt. Through relentless questioning they extracted a confession from then 14-year-old Moffatt. Despite witnesses who clearly placed him in a movie theatre before and after the murder of Wayne Mallette, he was found guilty and sentenced to youth detention. Eventually police acknowledged there was a serial predator in Toronto, but Moffatt was not released. However, when notes were shared between forces, Woodcock was arrested. After his conviction, Woodcock was called as a defence witness for Moffatt. The wrongful murder charge was stayed in 1957, and Moffatt was released from custody. Nate Hendley published in 2018 an account of Moffatt's experience, The Boy on the Bicycle.

=== Murder of Gary Morris ===
On October 6, 1956, Woodcock was riding his bike around Cabbagetown when he picked up 9-year-old Gary Morris. He then drove the boy to Cherry Beach, where he strangled and beat him to death—with a coroner later determining that Morris had died from a ruptured liver. Morris' body was found with a bite mark on his throat and, this time, paper clips seemed to have been ritualistically sprinkled near the corpse. Again, the clothing had been taken off the victim and then he had been re-dressed.

=== Murder of Carole Voyce ===
On January 19, 1957, Woodcock was again riding his bike when he approached 4-year-old Carole Voyce and offered her a ride. He then drove her under the Bloor Viaduct and murdered her. When she was found, her clothes had been pulled off. It appeared that she had been choked into unconsciousness and sexually molested, and that her death was caused by a tree branch being forcibly inserted into her vagina.

== Apprehension and trial ==
Witnesses saw a teenager cycling away from Carole Voyce's crime scene and an accurate composite sketch was created based on those witnesses' descriptions. This sketch ran on the front page of the Toronto Star and would lead to Woodcock's arrest on January 21, 1957, and his subsequent confession to all three murders. He recalled upon his arrest: "My fear was that Mother would find out. Mother was my biggest fear. I didn't know if the police would let her at me." Woodcock was tried only for the murder of Carole Voyce. On April 11, 1957, after a four-day trial, he was found not guilty by reason of insanity and was sent to the Oak Ridge division of the maximum-security Penetanguishene Mental Health Centre in Penetanguishene, Ontario.

== Imprisonment ==
While imprisoned, Woodcock was diagnosed as a psychopath. He underwent various forms of psychiatric therapy, including LSD treatments when they were popular in the 1960s. He was also given other personality-breaking drugs: scopolamine, sodium amytal, methedrine and dexamyl. He was subjected to "dyads"—a personality-breaking therapy in which inmates challenged each other's belief systems—which inmates referred to as "The Hundred-Day Hate-In". Dyads were developed in the late 1950s to early 1960s by a Harvard psychologist and former CIA interrogation and psychological warfare expert, Henry A. Murray. Woodcock did not respond well to these treatments and was not an ideal prisoner. He engaged in coercive sexual acts and exploited his fellow inmates, who were often less intelligent or less sane than he was. He convinced inmates that he had contact with an imaginary gang called The Brotherhood on the outside and that in order to be initiated, inmates had to perform oral sex on him and bring him gifts of cigarettes.

Woodcock was eventually transferred to less-restrictive institutions and ultimately arrived at the Brockville Psychiatric Hospital. Here, staff indulged his passion for trains by taking him to the Smiths Falls Railway Museum, and even took him to see The Silence of the Lambs. During this time, he legally changed his name to David Michael Krueger and rekindled a relationship with Bruce Hamill, an Ottawa killer who had been released from Oak Ridge and was working as a security guard at the Ottawa courthouse. Krueger convinced Hamill an alien brotherhood would solve his problems if he helped kill another Brockville inmate, Dennis Kerr.

=== Murder of Dennis Kerr ===
On July 13, 1991, Bruce Hamill went to a hardware store, bought a plumber's wrench, hatchet, knives and a sleeping bag, then went to the Brockville hospital and signed out the 52-year-old Krueger on his first publicly escorted day pass. Within the first hour of his first unsupervised release in 34 years, Krueger arranged to meet Dennis Kerr in the woods. When Dennis Kerr arrived, Krueger struck him in the head with the pipe wrench and continued to beat him into unconsciousness. Krueger and Hamill then seized the hatchet and knife they had hidden in the bushes while waiting for Kerr's arrival and hacked and stabbed Kerr, mutilating his body, nearly severing his head, and sodomized the corpse. Krueger then left the scene, walked to a police station about two miles away, and turned himself in.

=== Death ===
For the murder of Dennis Kerr, Krueger was transferred back to the Oak Ridge division of the Penetanguishene Mental Health Centre, where he had spent the majority of his 34 preceding years in custody. In the years after Kerr's murder, he was the focus of a biography and several documentary films and sometimes tried to explain why he killed, but he never came up with rational reasons. He said in a 1993 interview: "I'm accused of having no morality, which is a fair assessment, because my morality is whatever the system allows." On March 5, 2010, his 71st birthday, Krueger died of natural causes.

== See also ==
- List of serial killers by country
- List of youngest killers
