= Rebecca Morris (author) =

American author and journalist

- Rebecca Morris reading at the 2026 Gaithersburg Book Festival
- Born: Corvallis, Oregon, U.S.
- Education: Brown University; Seattle University; Oregon State University
- Occupations: Author, journalist
- Writing career
- Language: English
- Genres: True crime, Narrative nonfiction
- Notable works: A Killing in Amish Country; If I Can't Have You
- Website: rebeccatmorris.com

Rebecca Morris is an American true-crime author and a TV, radio and print journalist who lives in Seattle, Washington.

== Early life and education ==
Morris grew up in Oregon and attended Corvallis High School. Her parents were Lucille Morris (née Sterling) and James "Jimmie" Morris, a radio and broadcast pioneer who, from 1932 to 1973, headed the early radio station KOAC, which later became Oregon Public Broadcasting. Morris studied broadcast media at Oregon State University and received a B.A. in journalism from Seattle University, and an M.F.A. in creative writing from Brown University.

== Career ==
She wrote about theater for The Oregonian, anchored and reported for New York Public Radio, Bloomberg Radio, New York Times Radio, CNN and Fox News, and she freelanced articles for People, Entertainment Weekly, New York Newsday, American Theatre, and The Seattle Times.

Her first book, Ted and Ann: The Mystery of a Missing Child and Her Neighbor Ted Bundy, was independently released in 2011 as a paperback by Dog Ear Publishing and re-released in 2013 as an ebook. In November 2014, "Washington's Most Wanted" featured Morris and her book on KCPQ TV in the Seattle-Tacoma area.

In 2012, she wrote the book Bad Apples about teacher sex scandals.

Bodies of Evidence, the first in a book series titled Notorious USA, which Morris co-wrote with author Gregg Olsen, was released in September 2013. With the May 2014 release of Morris and Olsen's book If I Can't Have You about the disappearance of Susan Powell, Kirkus Reviews wrote that the authors "convincingly lay out the myriad of circumstantial evidence against (suspect) Josh." The book broke news with witness accounts that revealed the Powell children might have been molested. Publishers Weekly, in its review, wrote that the authors did "a solid job depicting the heartbreaking case of Susan Powell."

A second book in the Notorious USA series, Overkill, written by Morris and Olsen, debuted at number 20 on The New York Times Best Seller list in e-book nonfiction the week of August 16, 2015.

In 2016, Morris and Olsen co-wrote A Killing in Amish Country, released by St. Martin's Press. The book outlines one of just two reported murders among the Amish in America in more than 250 years. Also, the death of Barbara Weaver marked the third known Amish murder in hundreds of years. The Philadelphia Inquirer in its review wrote that "Olsen and Morris work hard to invest the crime with jump and venality."

In 2017, Morris co-authored The Crime Book volume with American crime writers Shanna Hogan, Lee Mellor, Cathy Scott and British author Michael Kerrigan, with a foreword for the U.S. edition by Scott and the U.K. edition by author Peter James. It was released in April 2017 in the U.K. and May 2017 in the U.S. by Dorling Kindersley (Penguin Random House) as part of its Big Ideas Simply Explained series.

In 2018, Morris called in a tip to The Seattle Times about a possible Confederate flag in her neighborhood. But it was a Norwegian flag hung by a man whose parents emigrated from Norway, to mark the start of the 2018 Winter Olympic Games and Norway's participation. TIME magazine picked it up, writing, "Woman Mistakes a Norwegian Flag for a Confederate One." Morris pointed to the current political climate as a possible reason for mixing up the flags.

=== Awards ===
A Killing in Amish Country was named Suspense Magazine's Best Books of 2016 in the true-crime category.

Overkill was a New York Times bestseller in August 2015.

Bodies of Evidence debuted the week of September 22, 2013, at number 16 on The New York Times Best Seller list in e-book nonfiction.

=== Bibliography ===
- A Murder in My Hometown (October 2021) (ISBN 979-8499367650)
- Boy Missing: The Search for Kyron Horman (May 2020) (ISBN 979-8645341213)
- The Crime Book (co-author) (2017) (ISBN 978-1465462862)
- The Girl and the Horrors of Howard Avenue: Oregon, Notorious USA (co-author) (March 2017) (ISBN 978-1544018713)
- A Killing in Amish Country: A Killing in Amish Country: Sex, Betrayal, and a Cold-Blooded Murder (co-author) (July 2016) (ISBN 978-1250067234)
- Overkill (True Crime Box Set, Notorious USA) (co-author) (August 2015) (ISBN 978-1505373684)
- If I Can't Have You: Susan Powell, Her Mysterious Disappearance, and the Murder of Her Children (co-author) (May 2015) (ISBN 978-1250066688)
- Ted and Ann: The Mystery of a Missing Child and Her Neighbor Ted Bundy (July 2013) (ISBN 978-1484925089)
- Bodies of Evidence (True Crime Box Set, Notorious USA) (co-author) (December 2013) (ISBN 978-1494414962)
- Bad Apples: Inside the Teacher/Student Sex Scandal Epidemic (co-author) (January 2012) (ASIN B0073XXP4U)
