= Wayne King (ice hockey) =

- Born: September 4, 1951 (age 74) Midland, Ontario, Canada
- Height: 5 ft 10 in (178 cm)
- Weight: 185 lb (84 kg; 13 st 3 lb)
- Position: Right wing
- Shot: Left
- Played for: California Golden Seals
- NHL draft: Undrafted
- Playing career: 1971–1977

Wayne Gordon King (born September 4, 1951) is a Canadian retired professional ice hockey winger of Ojibwe descent who played in the National Hockey League for the California Golden Seals. Skating for the Seals' best farm team, the Salt Lake Golden Eagles of the Western Hockey League, King recorded 34 goals and 34 assists in the 1973–74 campaign. At the conclusion of the season, he was named to the WHL Second Team All-Star Right Wing as a left-shot who played on the opposing wing.

== Early life ==
King was born in Midland, Ontario, about an hour north of Toronto, but raised in Port McNicoll, Ontario as the son of an engineer father and stay-at-home mother. The King's were the only Native family in Port McNicoll, the parents having both lived on reserves, but moving into the larger community in search of work.

After spending the 1976–77 season back in Salt Lake City, King joined the OHA senior Barrie Flyers, not far from his hometown. He averaged a point per game in 1977–78 for the Flyers then announced his retirement.

== Career ==
King reached the Ontario Hockey Association Finals while playing as a 17-year-old for the Midland Flyers Intermediate B team in 1968–69. In the same year, while trying out for the Junior B Owen Sound Greys, King was scouted by the owner and general manager of the Niagara Falls Flyers Junior A (OHL) team, Hap Emms, and spent the next two seasons playing for Niagara.

King was signed by the California Golden Seals, an expansion team in the National Hockey League. As a player he was known as a tough forward, an aggressive checker and an intrepid battler in the corners. He made his pro debut with the Columbus Seals of the International Hockey League (1945–2001) during the 1971–72 season. The Seals were the initial farm team of the California Golden Seals, and King later played for the top farm team, the Salt Lake City Golden Seals in the Western Hockey League. It was during his 1973–74 season with Salt Lake City that King put up the best statistical season of his professional career, compiling 34 goals and 34 assists in 76 games. King played 25 games with the California Golden Seals of the NHL during the 1974–75 season before suffering a devastating knee injury, tearing ligaments during a collision with Mike Marson of the Washington Capitals. Prior to this injury, King had amassed four goals and seven assists on the year. This injury slowed his pursuit of an NHL career, but King did not give up, returning to play for California in 1975–76. It was announced in 1976 that the Golden Seals would be ceasing operations at the end of the season. King appeared in 46 games in the 1976–77 season and retired at the end of the year after receiving little interest from the other professional teams.

King worked in an auto body shop for two years starting in 1977. Following this, King began his post-hockey career, working as a mental health worker and security guard at the Penetanguishene Mental Health Centre, now known as the Waypoint Centre for Mental Health Care. During this time, King became a registered practical nurse, having completed a two-year program to receive the designation. As of 2004, King was employed by the government of Ontario and enjoyed playing golf in his free time.

== Personal life ==
Upon retiring from hockey in 1978, King returned to his hometown of Midland, Ontario, to start a family with his wife, Shirley. The following year, 1979, they had their first child, a boy they named G.W. Four years later, in 1983, the Kings had another child, their daughter MaKala. King enjoyed playing hockey and fastball recreationally during his retirement, but due to a knee injury sustained during his professional career he no longer participates in these sports, but still golfs frequently.

== Career statistics ==
=== Regular season and playoffs ===
			Regular season					Playoffs
Season	Team	League	GP	G	A	Pts	PIM	GP	G	A	Pts	PIM
1968–69	Niagara Falls Flyers	OHA	4	1	0	1	0	—	—	—	—	—
1969–70	Niagara Falls Flyers	OHA	54	8	26	34	61	—	—	—	—	—
1970–71	Niagara Falls Flyers	OHA	59	14	18	32	112	—	—	—	—	—
1971–72	Columbus Seals	IHL	72	22	29	51	29	—	—	—	—	—
1972–73	Salt Lake Golden Eagles	WHL	72	16	27	43	55	9	2	5	7	11
1973–74	California Golden Seals	NHL	2	0	0	0	0	—	—	—	—	—
1973–74	Salt Lake Golden Eagles	WHL	76	34	34	68	72	5	1	0	1	9
1974–75	California Golden Seals	NHL	25	4	7	11	8	—	—	—	—	—
1975–76	California Golden Seals	NHL	46	1	11	12	26	—	—	—	—	—
1975–76	Salt Lake Golden Eagles	CHL	20	9	8	17	21	5	1	0	1	10
1976–77	Salt Lake Golden Eagles	CHL	51	12	13	25	36	—	—	—	—	—
1977–78	Barrie Flyers	OHA Sr.	40	24	16	40	47	—	—	—	—	—
NHL totals			73	5	18	23	34	—	—	—	—	—
