= The Crime Book =

2017 nonfiction book

- Author: DK Books
- Language: English
- Genre: True crime, History
- Publisher: Dorling Kindersley
- Publication date: May 2, 2017
- Publication place: United States
- Media type: Print Hardcover, Ebook
- Pages: 352
- ISBN: 978-1-4654-6286-2

The Crime Book (Big Ideas Simply Explained) is a non-fiction volume co-authored by American crime writers Cathy Scott, Shanna Hogan, Rebecca Morris, Canadian author and historian Lee Mellor, and United Kingdom author Michael Kerrigan, with a foreword for the U.S. edition by Scott and the U.K. edition by crime-fiction author Peter James. It was released by DK Books under its Big Ideas Learning imprint in May 2017.

== Synopsis ==
The publisher describes The Crime Book as a guide to criminology that explores the most infamous cases of all time, from serial killers to mob hits to war crimes and more.

It includes a variety of crimes committed by more than 100 of the world's most notorious criminals. From Jack the Ripper to Jeffrey Dahmer, the book is a study of international true-crime history that covers shocking stories through infographics and research that lays out key facts and details. It examines the science, psychology and sociology of criminal behavior. It profiles of villains, victims and detectives. Each clue is listed for readers to follow investigations from start to finish, and studies the police and detective work for each case.

In a Q&A article for CrimeCon.com's blog with Scott, the author described the crimes detailed in the book as "run[ning] the gamut—from nonviolent cons to gangland-style criminals, to white-collar offenders—with a complete representation starting with the first known homicide committed against a Neanderthal man."

== Critical reception ==
Rolling Stone magazine's description, in an August 2017 interview with co-author Scott about the book, wrote that it is "an encyclopedic treatment of the topic (that) makes for excellent companion reading. A compelling compilation of human trickery and awfulness, it covers crimes from arson, art forgery and kidnapping to bank robbery, drug trafficking and, of course, murder, with many of the entries accompanied by helpful illustrations."

Reader's Digest listed it as one of its "Best New Books You Should Read This April," describing it as "everything you ever wanted to know about some of the most audacious, hideous, hilarious and mysterious acts of crime in one explosive book, filled with graphs, illustrations, quotes and timelines. This highly addictive encyclopedia of crime ... is a trivia goldmine and a helpful guide allowing you to put events into context."

Culture Magazine in Germany wrote that the book "is lushly illustrated, readable and entertaining."

In September 2019, Flagler County, Florida sheriff's deputies discovered a copy of the book in the car of a couple arrested on attempted theft charges, noting that the book did not help the suspects carry out the crime.
