= Gary Alan Walker =

American serial killer (1953–2000)

Gary Walker
- Mugshot of Walker
- Born: September 25, 1953; Oklahoma, U.S.
- Died: January 13, 2000 (aged 46); Oklahoma State Penitentiary, Oklahoma, U.S.
- Status: Executed by lethal injection
- Convictions: Oklahoma: First-degree murder (4 counts); Kidnapping (2 counts); First-degree rape; Uttering a forged instrument; Kentucky: Murder; Kidnapping; Rape
- Penalty: Oklahoma: Death; Kentucky: Life imprisonment

Details
- Victims: 5
- Date: May 7–26, 1984
- Country: United States
- States: Oklahoma, Kentucky
- Imprisoned at: Oklahoma State Penitentiary

Gary Alan Walker (September 25, 1953 – January 13, 2000), also known as The Roaming Rapist, was an American serial killer and rapist. Within a 19-day span in May 1984, Walker committed five murders in Oklahoma. His crime spree began on May 7, 1984, when he robbed and murdered 63-year-old Eddie Cash after Cash picked him up while hitchhiking and invited him home. The remaining four victims were female; some of these women were also tortured, raped or kidnapped before their deaths.

Walker was arrested on June 2, 1984, and charged with multiple counts of first-degree murder. He was ultimately convicted and sentenced to multiple life sentences for the murders of his female victims, plus the death penalty for the murder of Cash. Walker was eventually executed by lethal injection on January 13, 2000.

== Personal life ==
Born on September 25, 1953, Gary Alan Walker, alias Gary Alan Edwards, had a tragic childhood marred by significant physical and sexual abuse as a child. His stepfather repeatedly beat him and once threatened him with a rifle. Additionally, Walker's mother had multiple men in the household and, when Walker was between ten and twelve years old, engaged in sexual relations with him as well as with his friends.

Walker struggled academically and was referred to Children's Medical Hospital at the age of 13. He stayed there for three months, where he was diagnosed with a personality disorder and poor control over his impulses and emotions. The hospital recommended that he be placed outside the home, but his parents refused. At age 14, Walker was convicted of car theft, his first offense in the juvenile justice system. By age 19, he was hospitalized at Eastern State Mental Hospital, where he was diagnosed with a severe schizophrenic-type disorder. He would go on to be hospitalized there eight more times, receiving anti-psychotic medications and electroconvulsive shock treatments. He was also diagnosed with bipolar disorder and treated with lithium.

== Murders ==
Between May 7 and 26, 1984, Gary Alan Walker, then 30 years old, committed a total of five murders in the U.S. states of Oklahoma and Kentucky.

On May 7, 1984, while he was hitchhiking in Broken Arrow, Oklahoma, Walker was approached by 63-year-old Eddie O. Cash, who gave him a ride to Owasso. Subsequently, Walker gained entry into Cash's home and decided to burglarize it. Cash had mentioned that he lived in Broken Arrow and this led to Walker's obtaining Cash's address through directory assistance. While Walker was making sure that no one was home by knocking on the door, Cash happened to arrive back home in his car, prompting Walker to flee the scene. However, Walker feared that Cash might contact the police, so he returned to the front door with a brick. After Walker knocked on the door and Cash opened it, Walker struck him with the brick and also strangled him with a vacuum cleaner cord. Cash died as a result of the attack.

On May 7, 1984, after the murder of Cash on that same day, 37-year-old Margaret Ann Bell Lydick became Walker's second victim. Lydick was abducted in Oklahoma before she was ultimately killed in Kentucky, making her the only one of Walker's victims to be killed outside of Oklahoma. Walker reportedly encountered Lydick in Poteau, Oklahoma . He kidnapped, raped, and tortured her, taking her from Oklahoma to Kentucky. Walker then murdered her and left her naked body at Princeton, Kentucky, where it was found on June 8, 1984.

On May 14, 1984, Walker committed his third murder, killing 35-year-old Jayne Kaye Hilburn. Walker reportedly strangled Hilburn, a grocery store clerk, near her house at Vinita, Oklahoma. He also stole her Camaro car, which was found two weeks later near Keystone Lake. Hilburn's body was discovered by her daughter on the day of Hilburn's death.

On May 23, 1984, Walker's fourth murder took place in Beggs, Oklahoma. The victim in this case was 32-year-old Janet Dee Jewell, who disappeared in the midst of job hunting. Her car was found abandoned at a local shopping mall in Tulsa, Oklahoma. According to Walker's confession to the murder, he approached Jewell while she was trying to refuel and restart her car and pretended to offer his help to do so. Walker managed to restart the car and then kidnapped Jewell, taking her to Beggs, where he raped and strangled her.

On May 24, 1984, 25-year-old Valerie Shaw-Hartzell, a radio reporter, became Walker's fifth murder victim. Walker kidnapped Shaw-Hartzell from a shopping mall parking lot in Tulsa, and held her hostage for 24 hours. He raped and strangled her before dumping her body in a rural area near Claremore in Rogers County.

== Arrest and charges ==
Merely days after he killed Valerie Shaw-Hartzell, through police investigations, Gary Walker was linked to the disappearances and murders of the victims he killed and listed on the wanted list. Walker was additionally named a suspect behind two missing person cases by the Arkansas authorities, and he was also suspected to have kidnapped a woman and raped her in a motel in Oklahoma, although the victim in this particular case survived.

Finally, Walker was arrested in Tulsa on June 2, 1984. He was thereafter charged with multiple counts of first-degree murder, as well as rape and kidnapping in all the serial murders and other crimes linked to him. Additionally, Walker also led police to the locations of where he disposed of the bodies of two of his victims, Janet Jewell and Valerie Shaw-Hartzell.

The murders were committed across a total of four counties in the state, namely Tulsa, Rogers, Craig and Okmulgee. The prosecution from these jurisdictions announced their intent to seek the death penalty for Walker; under Oklahoma state law, an offence of first-degree murder attracts a potential sentence of death or life imprisonment.

== Trial and sentencing ==
=== Cash murder trial ===
In July 1984, Gary Walker was ordered to stand trial first in Tulsa County for the murder of Eddie Cash, although the defence submitted a request to change the trial location to another county on the grounds of publicity. Jury selection concluded on November 7, 1984, and Walker's trial began that same month.

During the trial itself, the defence put up an insanity defence and submitted evidence of the troubled childhood which Walker had before he committed the murders. Dr. Thomas Goodman, a psychiatrist, testified at trial, supporting Walker's insanity defense. Dr. Goodman had reviewed Walker's medical records and conducted several examinations, including one under the influence of sodium amytal. Dr. Goodman opined that although Walker probably knew right from wrong at the time of the killing, his perception of the victim was so distorted that he believed he was killing his stepfather. Dr. Goodman also testified that Walker did not believe killing his stepfather was wrong. The prosecution however, rebutted that Walker was able to methodically seek the address of Cash, burglarize his home, and even killed Cash with the purpose of silencing him as a possible witness to his burglary attempt.

On November 13, 1984, the jury found Walker guilty of the first-degree murder of Eddie Cash.

On November 14, 1984, the jury unanimously recommended that Walker be sentenced to death for the murder of Eddie Cash.

On November 26, 1984, the trial judge, District Judge Joe Jennings, sentenced 31-year-old Gary Alan Walker to death during a formal sentencing hearing. An execution date of February 6, 1985, was set for Walker, but on December 6, 1984, the execution was stayed pending an automatic review by the Oklahoma Court of Criminal Appeals.

=== Shaw-Hartzell murder trial ===
Walker's second murder trial for the death of Valerie Shaw-Hartzell was conducted in May 1985, with jury selection commencing that same month.

At the end of his second murder trial, Walker was convicted of both kidnapping and first-degree murder, and Rogers County District Judge Edwin Carden sentenced him to death upon the jury's recommendation for capital punishment, marking Walker's second death sentence for the serial killings.

=== Sentencing for the other murders ===
As for the other three murders, Walker was similarly ordered to stand trial for these cases. For the murders of Janet Jewell and Jayne Hilburn, Walker was convicted in the Oklahoma courts and sentenced to life in prison for both homicides.

In August 1986, Walker was brought to trial in a Kentucky state court for murdering Margaret Bell Lydick. He reached a plea agreement with the prosecution, who decided to take the death penalty off the table on account of Walker's prior two death sentences for killing both Shaw-Hartzell and Cash. Walker was sentenced to life imprisonment plus 20 years for kidnapping, rape and murder by Caldwell Circuit Judge Willard Paxton.

In total, Walker received a total of two death sentences, six life sentences and 700 years' jail for all the five murders he committed (including the lesser charges pertaining to these serial murders).

== Appeals ==
On July 22, 1986, the Oklahoma Court of Criminal Appeals dismissed Gary Walker's direct appeal of his death sentence for the murder of Eddie Cash.

On December 1, 1986, the U.S. Supreme Court rejected Walker's appeal of his death sentence for Cash's murder.

On July 2, 1990, the Oklahoma Court of Criminal Appeals heard a separate appeal of Walker of his second death sentence for the murder of Valerie Shaw-Hartzell. The court allowed the appeal and overturned both the death sentence and murder conviction, and ordered that Walker be retried for killing Shaw-Hartzell. Walker was eventually retried for the case in 1991 but ultimately reached a plea deal and admitted to the killing. He was consequently resentenced to life in prison without the possibility of parole and avoided a second death sentence; however, Walker remained on death row for the murder of Cash.

While Walker's appeals against his one remaining death sentence were ongoing, Oklahoma Attorney-General Susan B. Loving petitioned to the Oklahoma Court of Criminal Appeals in March 1993 to set execution dates for Walker and five other inmates (including child rapist-killer Richard Rojem). Walker was originally set to be executed on September 17, 1993, but it was postponed due to his ongoing appeals.

On May 23, 1997, the Oklahoma Court of Criminal Appeals rejected another appeal from Walker.

On February 22, 1999, the 10th Circuit Court of Appeals turned down Walker's appeal.

On November 8, 1999, Walker's final appeal was denied by the U.S. Supreme Court, thus officiating Walker's eligibility for an execution date.

== Execution ==
On November 23, 1999, the Oklahoma Court of Criminal Appeals signed a death warrant for Gary Walker and scheduled his execution for January 13, 2000. During his last media interview, Walker described himself as "old and tired" and said he planned to wait for his execution to come. He also stated that he believed if he was not executed, he would have five years left to live due to a heart condition for which he had been hospitalized four times.

On January 13, 2000, 46-year-old Gary Alan Walker was put to death by lethal injection at the Oklahoma State Penitentiary. Prior to his execution, Walker reportedly apologized to the families of the people he killed and sought forgiveness. He was pronounced dead at 12:20 a.m. after the drugs were administered to him.

For his last meal, Walker ate three cheeseburgers with extra salt, three sliced tomatoes, french fries and a strawberry malt. He also received final prison visits from two sisters, a niece and two cousins. More than 30 family members of Walker's five murder victims gathered at the prison to witness his execution.

In the aftermath of his execution, Walker's case was adapted by Crime Stories with the episode airing in 2007.

== See also ==
- Capital punishment in Oklahoma
- List of people executed in Oklahoma
- List of people executed in the United States in 2000
- List of serial killers in the United States
