= Vernon Quinsey =

Canadian psychologist (born 1944)

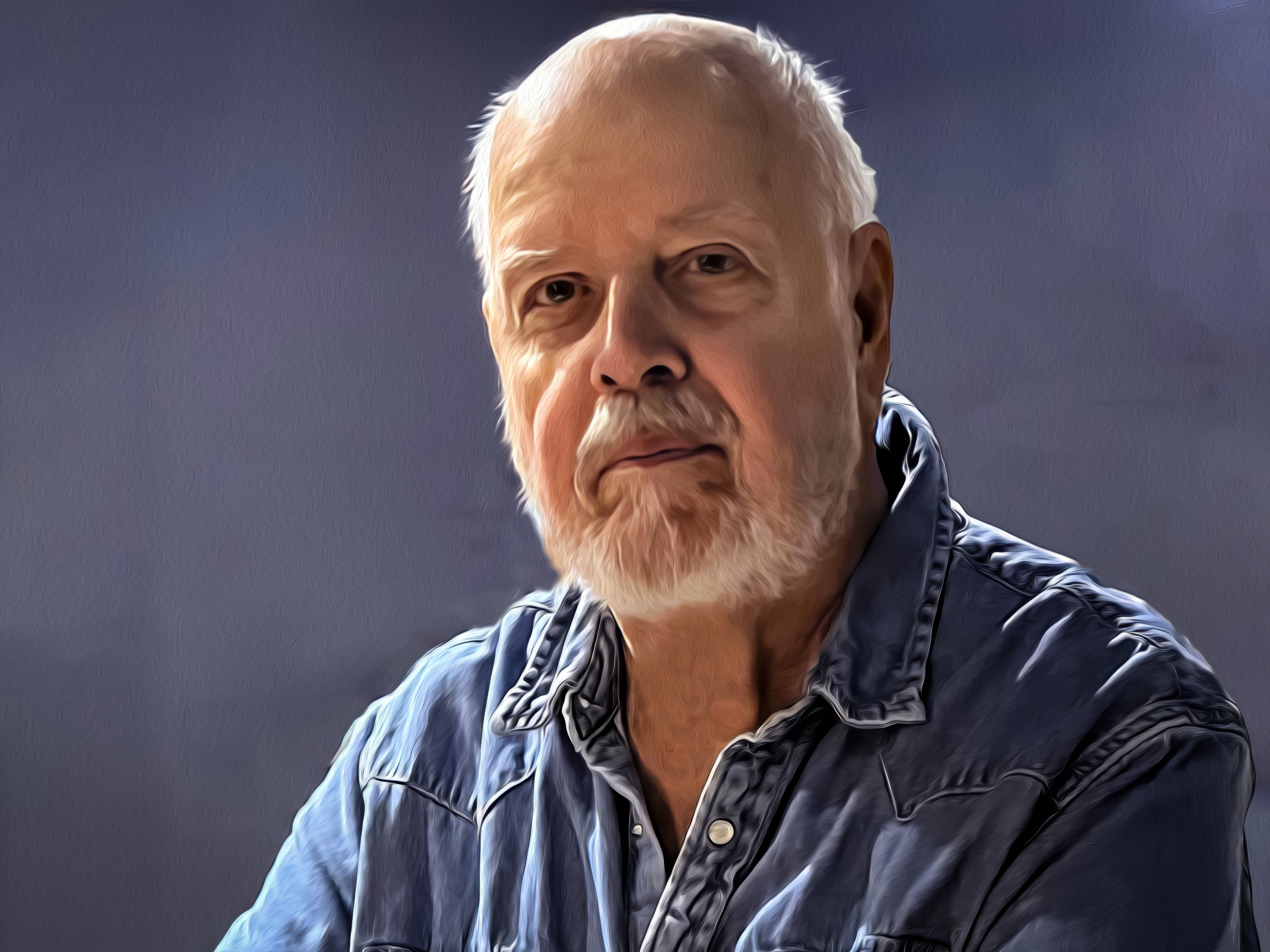
Vernon Quinsey in 2023

Vernon Lewis Quinsey (born October 10, 1944) is a Canadian psychologist. He has studied violent crime offenders, sex offenders, sexually violent predators, juvenile delinquency, and ways to predict, assess, and manage individuals with antisocial tendencies. He has used Darwinian theory to explain antisocial behavior and actuarial methods to predict it. In addition, he has extensively studied clinical judgment.

Quinsey was born in Flin Flon, Manitoba. He earned a bachelor's degree summa cum laude from the University of North Dakota in 1966. He then entered the biopsychology program at the University of Massachusetts at Amherst, as a university fellow, earning a master's degree in 1969 and a Ph.D. in 1970. He taught at Smith College while completing his graduate studies. In 1970 and 1971, Quinsey was a Killam postdoctoral fellow at Dalhousie University.

He joined the staff of Penetanguishene Mental Health Centre in 1971 and was appointed director of research in 1976. In 1984 he spent two years as a visiting scientist at the Institut Philippe-Pinel de Montréal and adjunct associate professor at Concordia University. In 1986 he was appointed associate professor in the Psychiatry Department at University of Toronto. He was then appointed professor and Queen's National Scholar in the Psychology Department at Queen's University in 1988, where he held cross positions in the Biology Department and Division of Forensic/Correctional Psychiatry. He was the head of the Psychology Department from 2004 to 2008. In 2009 he was appointed professor emeritus of psychology, biology, and psychiatry. He held an Ontario Mental Health Foundation senior research fellowship (1997-2003).

Quinsey chaired the Ontario Mental Health Foundation Research Committee from 1980 to 1982; the American National Institute of Mental Health Criminal and Violent Behavior Research Review Committee from 1986 to 1988, and the Ministry of Community and Social Services Research Review Committee from 1987 to 1991.

In 2008, Quinsey was awarded the Canadian Psychological Association's Donald O. Hebb Award for Distinguished Contributions to Psychology as a Science.

Quinsey had 30,032 citations identified by Google Scholar in December of 2024.

== Selected publications ==
Books

- Rice ME, Harris GT, Varney GW, Quinsey VL (1989). Violence in Institutions: Understanding, Prevention, and Control. Hogrefe and Huber, ISBN 9780920887479
- Zamble E, Quinsey VL (1997). The Criminal Recidivism Process. Cambridge University Press, ISBN 9780521795104
- Quinsey VL, Lalumière M (2001). Assessment of Sexual Offenders Against Children, Second Edition. SAGE Publications, ISBN 9780761924319
- Quinsey VL, Skilling TA, Lalumière ML, Craig W (2004). Juvenile Delinquency: Understanding the Origins of Individual Differences. American Psychological Association, ISBN 9781591470489
- Lalumière ML, Harris GT, Quinsey VL, Rice ME (2005). The Causes of Rape: Understanding Individual Differences in the Male Propensity for Sexual Aggression. American Psychological Association, ISBN 9781591471868
- Quinsey VL, Harris GT, Rice ME, Cormier C (2006). Violent Offenders: Appraising and Managing Risk, Second Edition. American Psychological Association, ISBN 9781591473435

Papers and chapters

- Davies, ST, Helmus, LM, Quinsey, VL (2020). Improving risk communication: Developing risk ratios for the VRAG-R. Journal of Interpersonal Violence, https://doi.org/10.1177/0886260520914555.
- Quinsey, VL (2012). Pragmatic and Darwinian views of the paraphilias. Archives of Sexual Behavior, 41, 217-220.
- Quinsey, VL (2010). Coercive paraphilic disorder. Archives of Sexual Behavior, 405-410.
- Quinsey, VL (2009). Are we there yet? Stasis and progress in forensic psychology. Canadian Psychology, 59-21.
- Harris GT, Rice ME, Quinsey VL, Lalumière ML, Boer D, Lang, C (2003). A multisite comparison of actuarial risk instruments for sex offenders. Psychological Assessment, Vol 15(3), Sep 2003, 413–425. doi: 10.1037/1040-3590.15.3.413 PMID 14593842
- Hanson RK, Gordon A, Harris AJR, Marques JK, Murphy W, Quinsey VL, Seto MC (2002). First report of the collaborative outcome data project on the effectiveness of psychological treatment for sex offenders. Sexual Abuse: A Journal of Research and Treatment, April 2002, Volume 14, Issue 2, pp 169–194, PMID 11961890
- Lieb R, Quinsey VL, Berliner L (1998). Sexual predators and social policy. Crime and Justice, Vol. 23, (1998), pp. 43–114
- Harris GT, Rice ME, Quinsey VL, Chaplin TC (1998). Viewing time as a measure of sexual interest among child molesters and normal heterosexual men. Behaviour Research and Therapy, Volume 34, Issue 4, April 1996, Pages 389–394, PMID 8871372
- Quinsey VL, Khanna, A, Malcolm PB (1998). A retrospective evaluation of the Regional Treatment Centre sex offender treatment program. Journal of Interpersonal Violence, October 1998 vol. 13 no. 5 621-644 doi: 10.1177/088626098013005005
- Harris GT, Rice ME, Quinsey VL (1998). Appraisal and management of risk in sexual aggressors: Implications for criminal justice policy. Psychology, Public Policy, and Law, Vol 4(1-2), Mar-Jun 1998, 73-115. doi: 10.1037/1076-8971.4.1-2.73
- Lalumière ML, Quinsey VL (1996). Sexual deviance, antisociality, mating effort, and the use of sexually coercive behaviors. Personality and Individual Differences, Volume 21, Issue 1, July 1996, Pages 33–48 doi:10.1016/0191-8869(96)00059-1
- Landolt MA, Lalumière ML, Quinsey VL (1995). Sex differences in intra-sex variations in human mating tactics: An evolutionary approach. Ethology and Sociobiology, Volume 16, Issue 1, January 1995, Pages 3–23 10.1016/0162-3095(94)00012-V
- Quinsey VL, Rice ME, Harris GT (1995). Actuarial prediction of sexual recidivism. Journal of Interpersonal Violence, March 1995 vol. 10 no. 1 85-105 doi: 10.1177/088626095010001006
- Harris GT, Rice ME, Quinsey VL (1994). Psychopathy as a taxon: evidence that psychopaths are a discrete class. Journal of Consulting and Clinical Psychology, Vol 62(2), Apr 1994, 387–397. doi: 10.1037/0022-006X.62.2.387 PMID 8201078
- Lalumière ML, Quinsey VL (1994). The Discriminability of Rapists from Non-Sex Offenders Using Phallometric Measures A Meta-Analysis. Criminal Justice and Behavior, 21(1), 150–175. The discriminability of rapists from non-sex offenders using phallometric measures: a meta-Analysis. Criminal Justice and Behavior, 21.1 (1994): 150–175.
- Harris GT, Rice ME, Quinsey VL, Chaplin TC, Earls C (1992). Maximizing the discriminant validity of phallometric assessment data. Psychological Assessment, Vol 4(4), Dec 1992, 502–511. doi: 10.1037/1040-3590.4.4.502 DOI:01/1992; 4:502-511.
- Rice ME, Quinsey VL, Harris GT (1991). Sexual recidivism among child molesters released from a maximum security psychiatric institution. Journal of Consulting and Clinical Psychology, Vol 59(3), Jun 1991, 381–386. doi: 10.1037/0022-006X.59.3.381 PMID 2071722
- Quinsey VL, Earls CM (1990). The modification of sexual preferences. in Handbook of sexual assault: Issues, theories, and treatment of the offender. Applied clinical psychology, (pp. 279–295). Plenum Press, ISBN 9780306432729
- Rice ME, Harris GT, Quinsey VL, (1990). A follow-up of rapists assessed in a maximum-security psychiatric facility. Journal of Interpersonal Violence, December 1990 vol. 5 no. 4 435-448 doi: 10.1177/088626090005004001
- Quinsey VL, Chaplin TC, Upfold D (1984). Sexual arousal to nonsexual violence and sadomasochistic themes among rapists and non-sex-offenders. Journal of Consulting and Clinical Psychology, Vol 52(4), Aug 1984, 651-657. doi: 10.1037/0022-006X.52.4.651 PMID 6470290
- Quinsey VL (1977). The assessment and treatment of child molesters: A review. Canadian Psychological Review/Psychologie canadienne, Vol 18(3), Jul 1977, 204–220. doi: 10.1037/h0081436
- Quinsey VL, Chaplin TC, Varney G (1981). A comparison of rapists' and non-sex offenders' sexual preferences for mutually consenting sex, rape, and physical abuse of women. Behavioral Assessment, 3, 127–135.
- Quinsey VL, Chaplin TC, Carrigan WF (1979). Sexual preferences among incestuous and nonincestuous child molesters. Behavior Therapy, Volume 10, Issue 4, September 1979, Pages 562–565 doi:10.1016/S0005-7894(79)80057-X
- Quinsey VL, Ambtman R (1979). Variables affecting psychiatrists' and teachers' assessments of the dangerousness of mentally ill offenders. Journal of Consulting and Clinical Psychology, 47, 353-362.
- Quinsey VL, Steinman CM, Bergersen SG, Holmes TF (1975). Penile circumference, skin conductance, and ranking responses of child molesters and “normals” to sexual and nonsexual visual stimuli. Behavior Therapy, Volume 6, Issue 2, March 1975, Pages 213–219 doi:10.1016/S0005-7894(75)80143-2,
- Quinsey VL (1970). Some applications of adaptation-level theory to aversive behavior. Psychological Bulletin, 441-450.
