= William Dean Christensen =

American serial killer (1945–1990)

- Born: September 24, 1945; Bethesda, Maryland, U.S.
- Died: October 31, 1990 (aged 45); Huntingdon, Pennsylvania, U.S.
- Other names: "The American Jack the Ripper"; Richard Owen; John Schrader; Jeffrey Shrader
- Convictions: Pennsylvania; First degree murder Maryland; Second degree rape battery
- Penalty: Pennsylvania; Life imprisonment Maryland; 40 years

Details
- Victims: 4–24+
- Span of crimes: 1982–1983
- Country: United States and Canada (others suspected)
- States: Quebec and Pennsylvania (others suspected)
- Date apprehended: December 4, 1983

William Dean Christensen (September 24, 1945 – October 31, 1990) was a Canadian-American serial killer who killed and mutilated at least four people in Canada and the United States between 1982 and 1983. He became known as the American Jack the Ripper – an allusion to English serial killer Jack the Ripper – for the brutality of his crimes and the mystery surrounding his victim count. He was convicted of two murders in Pennsylvania and sentenced to life in prison plus 40 years in Maryland for rape.

== Early life ==
Christensen was born on September 24, 1945, in Bethesda, Maryland. (Note: Some sources list his last name as "Christenson") His criminal pastimes began in 1969 when he picked up a 19-year-old hitchhiker in the Georgetown neighborhood of Washington, D.C. He drove her to an isolated area where he raped and stabbed her 19 times in her arms, hands, and face. She survived the attack and Christensen was arrested. He was sentenced to five years in prison for this crime but instead was transferred to a state facility for delinquents, then released the following year. In 1974, Christensen and another man abducted a go-go dancer in Georgetown and drove her to a secluded area. The two took turns raping and beating the woman. Christensen told her, "I will dismember you with an hacksaw". Eventually, the two drove her to Christensen's parents' home, where they again raped her. The two were arrested and Christensen was sentenced to 16 years in prison. He was released early in 1980.

In July 1980, Christensen abducted a young woman at a bus stop in Washington, D.C., drove her to one of his family member's houses and raped her, then let her go. He was soon connected to the crime and arrest warrants were issued. In January 1981, Christensen attempted to move to Toronto but was arrested for falsifying information on his passport and spent 21 days in jail. Soon after his release, he created an alias: Richard Owen. On April 16, 1981, Owen kidnapped and raped a woman in Montreal. Arrested yet again, he pleaded guilty in July and was sentenced to a year and six months in prison. Afterwards, it was discovered that Owen was Christensen, and since he was wanted for rape in Washington, D.C., U.S. authorities asked Canadian officials to transfer Christensen to a jail in Maryland. Due to a clerical error, Christensen was released.

== Murders ==
In April 1982, Christensen abducted 27-year-old Sylvie Trudel in Montreal. He brought her to an empty apartment where he raped, beat, and strangled her to death. Afterwards, he decapitated and dismembered her body with a hacksaw. That same month, Christensen strangled 26-year-old Murielle Guay, again dismembering the body afterwards. Both of their remains were discovered on April 27. Trudel was determined to have been dead for about 20 to 30 hours and Guay was determined to have been dead for 10 days. Christensen was almost immediately identified as a suspect because he owned the apartment Trudel was found in; witnesses identified him as the last person seen with Guay. Christensen soon fled to the United States, while Canadian arrest warrants were issued. The following month, Canadian detectives interviewed Christensen's parents at the family home in Maryland. The two admitted that they had met with their son and smuggled him $5,000.

Over the next few months, Christensen was reportedly spotted in six states; Florida, New York, New Jersey, Georgia, Kentucky, and Pennsylvania. He was living in Trenton, New Jersey, and Philadelphia, Pennsylvania, using the alias "John Robert Schrader". On September 23, 1982, Christensen picked up 23-year-old go-go dancer Michelle Angiers in Scranton, Pennsylvania, and drove her to Dickson City, where he raped her and stabbed her 30 times, killing her. On June 29, 1983, Christensen shot two men at an Amtrak railroad station in Trenton. The men survived. Afterwards, he created another alias: Jeffrey Shrader. On December 4, 1983, Christensen shot and killed 51-year-old Joseph Connelly outside a bar after an argument. Witnesses to the shooting reported what they had seen, and Christensen was located a few hours later and arrested.

== Trial and death ==
Upon his arrest, Christensen said he was Shrader, and he was convicted of Connelly's murder under that name. The FBI, brought in to identify "Shrader", collected his fingerprints, checked them against their database, and declared, erroneously, that they did not match anyone on their radar. A few days after his conviction, Shrader was identified as Christensen. US and Canadian authorities suspected Christensen had killed more than a dozen people during his two years on the run. Due to this, and the brutality of his known killings, Pennsylvania police constable Bill McAndrew labeled Christensen "a real American Jack the Ripper", after the serial killer who murdered and mutilated five prostitutes in London in 1888 and was never caught. Media outlets seized upon the nickname. In early 1985, Pennsylvania investigators linked Angiers' murder to Christensen after finding a bloody knife and hacksaw in his home. Christensen was convicted of Angiers' murder in 1990, for which he was sentenced to serve 10 to 20 years in prison. He was also brought to Maryland to be prosecuted for the 1981 rape of a woman there. He was convicted and sentenced to 40 years in prison. In 1990 a cellmate of Christensen said that he had allegedly confessed to killing 24 people: two in England, four in Canada, and 16 in the United States. The claims were investigated but nothing was proven.

On October 31, 1990, Christensen died of cancer while imprisoned at State Correctional Institution – Huntingdon. His death was not reported until July 1991.

== See also ==
- List of serial killers by country
- List of serial killers in the United States
