= Edward Delon Warren =

American criminal and serial killer

- Born: 1953; Brookings, Oregon, U.S.
- Died: 2003 (aged 49–50); Salem, Oregon, U.S.
- Conviction: Murder x2
- Penalty: Death; commuted to life imprisonment x2

Details
- Victims: 3
- Span of crimes: 1976–1979
- Country: United States
- State: Oregon
- Date apprehended: October 4, 1979

Edward Delon Warren (1953–2003) was an American serial killer and criminal. A robber and burglar, Warren was convicted for the 1979 double murder of a couple in Brookings, Oregon and sentenced to death. The sentence was later commuted to two life imprisonment terms, which he served until his death in 2003. Five years later, he would be linked an unsolved 1976 Portland murder which, at the time, was the oldest solved cold case in the state's history.

== Early life and crimes ==
Little is known about Warren's upbringing. Hailing from Brookings, he was the older of two siblings. His first recorded crime occurred in January 1972, when he robbed a convenience store in Portland. Edward was imprisoned for the crime, but managed to escape within the next year and travel to Salem. There, he broke into the house of a local woman, tying her up at gunpoint and stealing her car, before being quickly reapprehended. Between December 1973 and March 24, 1976, he remained behind bars.

== Murders ==
=== Rosa Cinnamon ===
On the morning of March 24, 1976, Warren was paroled and hitched a ride to Portland, where he was required to check in with his parole officer. During the visit, he claimed that he planned to study at Portland Community College and to live at a residence hotel in the northern part of the city. At some point during the night, Warren was presumably looking for a place to burgle, before picking the apartment of 80-year-old Dayton native Rosa Cinnamon as his target. He kicked the door in, and started fighting with the elderly woman, receiving several scratches from the ordeal. Despite her efforts, Cinnamon was overpowered, beaten and finally strangled to death. Her lifeless body was found the next day, but since no suspect could be located, the case quickly went cold, and would remain that way for three decades.

=== Ricky Hemphill and Charla Toma ===
On September 9, 1979, the body of 19-year-old Coast Guard petty officer Ricky Dale Hemphill was found at a gravel bar near the Chetco River, about 16 miles east of Brookings. Originally from Riverside, California, Hemphill was stationed in Brookings as a boatswain's mate third class, and was last seen in his pickup truck with his 18-year-old girlfriend Charla Toma, of Lincoln City. He had been shot twice in the back. About 24 miles upstream, another body was found, later determined to be that of Toma. The next day, officers conducting a routine traffic stop in Port Orford stopped a vehicle occupied by three men: 26-year-old Edward Delon Warren, 34-year-old George Rose and another man who was never identified. Suddenly, Warren and Rose dashed into the woods, leaving the third occupant behind. After an hour being chased by police bloodhounds, the two men were captured. Warren was detained as a suspect in the Brookings murders, while Rose was returned to the Tillamook Forestry Camp, where he was serving a sentence for first-degree robbery and attempted assault.

== Trial, imprisonment and death ==
At his February 1980 trial for the Hemphill-Toma murders, Warren claimed that a profane remark from Hemphill resulted in his shooting. After the fact, he ordered Charla Toma to drive in Hemphill's pickup truck up the Chetco River, and after a short walk through the woods, he shot her in the back three times and left. Pleading guilty to the murders, Justice Frederick Starkweather Jr. sentenced Warren to death, citing his belief that the defendant was a violent criminal who posed a danger to society. At a later point, the sentence was commuted by the Oregon Supreme Court, and Warren was given two life terms. He spent the rest of his life in prison, with his DNA entered into the national database in 1999. In 2003, Warren died inside a Salem prison hospital from respiratory failure.

In 2009, 33 years after Rosa Cinnamon's brutal murder, the Portland Police Department announced that Edward Delon Warren was linked to the killings via his DNA, which was found under the victim's fingernails. At the time of this discovery, the case was the oldest solved case in state history.

== See also ==
- List of serial killers in the United States
