= Russell Maurice Johnson =

Canadian serial killer, rapist and necrophile

- Born: 1947 (age 78–79); St. Thomas, Ontario, Canada
- Other names: "The Bedroom Strangler" "The Balcony Killer"
- Conviction: Murder
- Penalty: Not guilty by reason of insanity

Details
- Victims: 7+
- Span of crimes: 1973–1977
- Country: Canada
- State: Ontario
- Date apprehended: July 1977
- Imprisoned at: Waypoint Centre for Mental Health Care, Penetanguishene, Ontario

Russell Maurice Johnson (born 1947), also known as The Bedroom Strangler, is a Canadian serial killer and rapist who was convicted of raping and murdering at least three women in London and Guelph in the 1970s although the total number of victims later turned out to be higher. He was found not guilty by reason of insanity and indefinitely confined at Waypoint Centre for Mental Health Care in Penetanguishene.

== Murders ==
In the span of four years, Johnson, an automotive store clerk and weightlifter who worked for Ford Motor Company of Canada in Talbotville, raped and strangled at least seven women in their apartments in London and Guelph. He would stalk his victims to their apartments, waiting until he thought they were asleep, gaining access to their apartments by scaling the outside walls, sometimes for many stories to enter. There, he attacked them, sometimes watching the women sleep before sexually assaulting and suffocating them. Aside from his murders, he non-fatally assaulted 11 other women in the same area.

=== Victims ===
- Mary-Catherine Hicks (20) - Hicks was a student at a London, Ontario university and was found dead in the autumn of 1973. There were no signs of struggle or violence at the scene, and she was neatly tucked into her bed. Investigators thought she had died from a prescription drug interaction, until Johnson's second confession in 1977, where he admitted to strangling four additional women.
- Alice Ralston (42) - Ralston was living in Guelph, Ontario in the autumn of 1973, when she was killed. She appeared to have died of Arteriosclerosis in her sleep. Her cause of death was listed as natural until Johnson's confession.
- Eleanor Hartwick (27) - Hartwick's body was discovered in the summer of 1974, and she appeared to have died, peacefully, in her sleep.
- Doris Brown (49) - Brown was killed the evening between August 8 and August 9, 1974, in her second floor Guelph, Ontario apartment. Her daughter, Laura, discovered Doris's body on the morning of the 9th, neatly tucked into her bed. Her cause of death was listed as natural and "unexplained". Johnson admitted to strangling Doris, during his initial confession on July 29, 1977.
- Diane Beitz (23) - Beitz's body was found on New Year's Eve, 1974, by her boyfriend James Britton, with whom she had been engaged to the previous night. She had been strangled with a brassiere and her hands tied behind her back with a nylon stocking. She had been raped after death. The Guelph police offered a $5,000 reward for any clues leading to the discovery of her killer, while also searching for a dark-coloured, four-door Buick automobile seen parked at the rear of the apartment building in the early morning. At the time of her murder, Johnson was visiting his father in Guelph, and knew of Beitz because his ex-wife used to live in the same apartment building.
- Louella Jeanne George (23) - George was killed in the evening between April 14 and April 15, 1977, after Johnson climbed to her fourth-floor apartment balcony and barged in, raping and killing her on the spot. Her jewelry and undergarments were discovered in a trash can between her apartment and the apartment Johnson was residing in, at the time of Luella's death.
- Donna Veldboom (22) - Veldboom, who lived in the apartment above Johnson's, was strangled to death July 16, 1977. She was Johnson's first stabbing, and his obsessive compulsive (OCD) tendencies compelled him to clean her body, tuck her into bed, and wash the bloody linens.

== Arrest, trial and imprisonment ==
In July 1977, Russell Johnson was arrested on charges of murdering three of the women: Beitz, George and Veldboom. According to Police Inspector Robert Young, Johnson, who had voluntarily admitted himself to the London Psychiatric Hospital in 1969 and been diagnosed as a sexual deviant, told him that he wouldn't have killed the girls if he had gotten proper medical treatment. At trial, Johnson claimed to have had an "uncontrollable urge" to rape and kill.

In the beginning, Johnson pleaded not guilty for the three killings before the Ontario Supreme Court. Much to the surprise of the parties present, Johnson additionally admitted to perpetrating four other homicides and 11 non-fatal assaults. As he demonstrated an inability to grasp the harshness of the crimes, Johnson was found not guilty by reason of insanity and indefinitely confined to the Waypoint Centre for Mental Health Care.

== Aftermath ==
The investigation surrounding Johnson's crimes was the costliest in Ontario's history, amassing at least $30,000 in expenses. Every year, Johnson applies for more lenient conditions at his facility, which the family members of his victims strenuously object to. He has been chemically castrated and takes Lupron to reduce his testosterone. In 2012, the Ontario Court of Appeals rejected his plea to be moved to the Brockville Mental Health Centre.

== Bibliography ==
- Arntfield, M. (2015). Murder City: The Untold Story of Canada's Serial Killer Capital, 1959-1984. FriesenPress. ISBN 978-1-4602-6182-8.
- Halfnight, Drew (1 December 1969). "Serial killer Russell Johnson to remain in maximum security mental hospital". National Post.
- Jones, Frank (1981). Trail of Blood: A Canadian Murder Odyssey. McGraw-Hill Ryerson. ISBN 978-0-07-548414-1.
- Keller, Robert (2016) [2015]. Canadian Monsters: 25 Horrific Serial Killer Cases. Author. ISBN 978-1-5352-1226-7.
- Lane, B.; Gregg, W. (1995). The Encyclopedia of Serial Killers. Berkley Books. pp. 215–216. ISBN 978-0-425-15213-3.
- Mandel, Michele (6 December 2016). "Victims' families still ready to keep watch on unrepentant Bedroom Strangler". Toronto Sun.
- Mellor, Lee (2012). "Nature, nurture, or neither?". Cold North Killers: Canadian Serial Murder. Dundurn. pp. 61–66. ISBN 978-1-4597-0126-7.
- Farrell, Laila. Russell Johnson. Canadian Crimeopedia.

== See also ==
- List of serial killers by country
