= Lee Mellor =

Anglo-Canadian author and criminologist (born 1982)

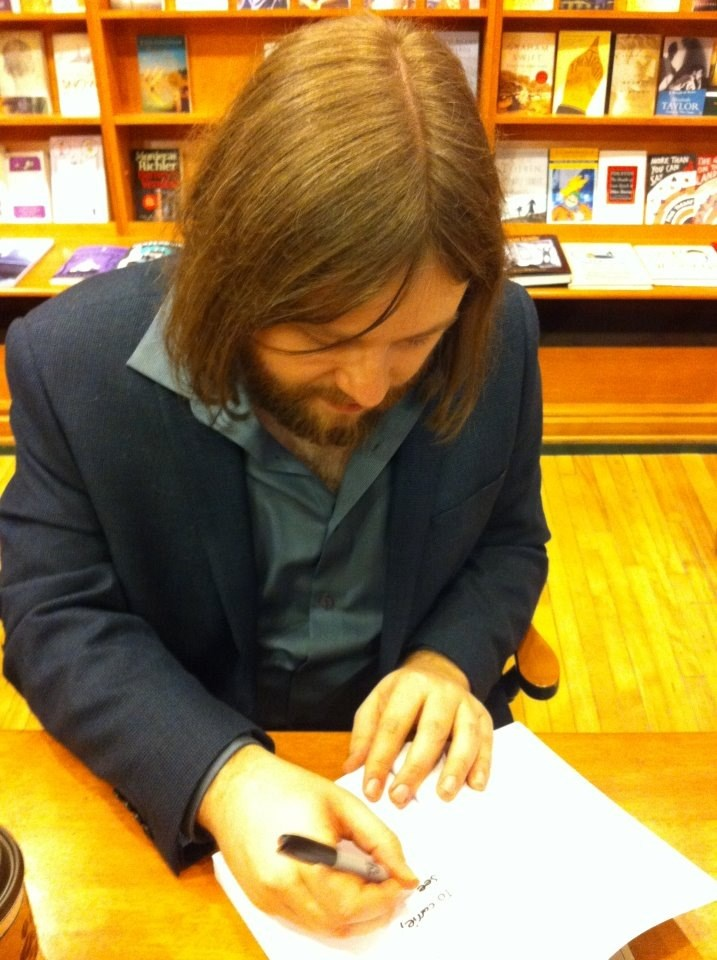
- Mellor in 2013
- Born: Lee Philip Mellor; August 4, 1982 (age 44); Chester, Cheshire, England
- Education: Concordia University
- Occupations: Author, scholar, criminologist and songwriter
- Website: www.leemellor.com

Lee Mellor (born August 4, 1982, in Chester, England) is an Anglo-Canadian author, scholar, criminologist and songwriter.

== Education ==
Mellor attended Bowmanville High School and then earned a Bachelor of Arts degree in history and a Doctorate of Philosophy in the interdisciplinary study of homicide and sex crime from Concordia University, in 2009 and 2019, respectively.

== Criminology ==
Mellor's first book, Cold North Killers: Canadian Serial Murder, was released on March 3, 2012, by Dundurn Press. The true crime work documents and analyzes the phenomenon of serial homicide in Canada, providing mre than 60 cases as examples. He researched 75 serial homicides but did not include them all because of limited space in the book.

A second volume on Canadian multicide, entitled Rampage: Canadian Mass Murder and Spree Killing, was released on March 9, 2013.

In academia, Mellor co-edited with Joan Swart the textbook Homicide: A Forensic Psychology Casebook (2016), for which he also penned the Introduction along with chapters on homicidal paraphilia, necrophilia, sexual sadism, and psychopathy.

In 2017, Mellor co-authored The Crime Book volume with American crime writers Shanna Hogan, Rebecca Morris, Cathy Scott, and British author Michael Kerrigan, with a foreword for the U.S. edition by Scott and for the U.K. edition by author Peter James. It was released in April 2017 in the U.K. and May 2017 in the U.S. by Dorling Kindersley (Penguin Random House).

Mellor is also the primary editor of Understanding Necrophilia: A Global Multidisciplinary Approach (2017) with Anil Aggrawal and Eric W. Hickey. His chapters "Wider Shades of Pale" and "Mincing Words" examine flaws in the current definition of necrophilia and argue for an expansion of the concept to include acts of sexually motivated post-mortem mutilation, posing, and "trophy-taking", as well as certain types of cannibalism and vampirism. In "Necrophilia-Spectrum Behavior and the Thematic-Derivative Model of Sexual Progression", Mellor offers a model which charts both normophilic and paraphilic sexual interests, using the case of Armin Meiwes as an example. His "Five Allures of Necrophilia" proposes that there are five basic appeals of necrophilia: passivity/inertia, corporeal/sensory, reminiscent/identity, ritual/iconographic, and spiritual/magical.

Mellor was editor-in-chief of the e-magazine Serial Killer Quarterly, to which he regularly contributed articles, along with fellow true-crime writers Harold Schechter, Peter Vronsky, Katherine Ramsland, Michael Newton, Cathy Scott, Burl Barer, Carol Anne Davis, and Robert Hoshowsky.

In October 2019, Mellor began a six-part lecture series, "Murder in VR", on the topic of homicide in virtual reality. The series was hosted on the Sansar social VR platform.

== Books ==
- Mellor, L. 2012. Cold North Killers: Canadian Serial Murder. Toronto, Ontario, Canada: Dundurn.
- Mellor, L. 2013. Rampage: Canadian Mass Murder and Spree Killing. Toronto, Ontario, Canada: Dundurn.
- Swart, J., & L. Mellor. 2016. Homicide: A Forensic Psychology Casebook. Boca Raton, Florida: CRC Press.
- Mellor, L., A. Aggrawal & E. W. Hickey. 2017. Understanding Necrophilia: A Global Multidisciplinary Approach. San Diego, California: Cognella.
- Mellor, L., S. Hogan, M. Kerrigan, R. Morris & C. Scott. 2017. The Crime Book. London, England: Dorling Kindersley.
- Mellor, L. 2020. Behind the Horror: True Stories That Inspired Horror Movies. London, England: Dorling Kindersley.
- Mellor, L. 2021. Conspiracies Uncovered: Cover-Ups, Hoaxes, and Secret Societies. London, England: Dorling Kindersley.

== Articles and chapters ==
- Mellor, L. 2016. "Original Gangsta: Self-Conceptualization and Criminogenic Authenticity in Hip Hop Music", in The Criminal Humanities: An Introduction, eds. Michael Andrew Arntfield & Marcel Danesi. New York: Peter Lang.
- Mellor, L., V. Venkatesh, J. Wallin & T. Thomas. 2016. "Killing for Slender Man: The Emergence of an Electronic Gospel", in The Criminal Humanities: An Introduction, eds. Michael Andrew Arntfield & Marcel Danesi. New York: Peter Lang.
- Mellor, L. 2016. "Introduction", in Homicide: A Forensic Psychology Casebook, eds. Lee Mellor & Joan Swart. Boca Raton, Florida: CRC Press.
- Mellor, L. 2016. "An Introduction to Sexual Homicides", in Homicide: A Forensic Psychology Casebook, eds. Lee Mellor & Joan Swart. Boca Raton, Florida: CRC Press.
- Mellor, L. 2016. "Necrophilic Homicide Offenders", in Homicide: A Forensic Psychology Casebook, eds. Lee Mellor & Joan Swart. Boca Raton, Florida: CRC Press.
- Mellor, L. 2016. "Sexually Sadistic Homicide Offenders", in Homicide: A Forensic Psychology Casebook, eds. Lee Mellor & Joan Swart. Boca Raton, Florida: CRC Press.
- Mellor, L., K. Ramsland & M. Funicelli. 2016. "Psychopathic Homicide Offenders", in Homicide: A Forensic Psychology Casebook, eds. Lee Mellor & Joan Swart. Boca Raton, Florida: CRC Press.
- Mellor, L. 2017. "Wider Shades of Pale: Expanding the Necrophilic Behavioral Spectrum", in Understanding Necrophilia: A Global Multidisciplinary Approach, eds. Lee Mellor, Anil Aggrawal & Eric W. Hickey. San Diego, California: Cognella.
- Mellor, L. 2017. "Mincing Words: Refining the Language and Interpretation of Mutilation", in Understanding Necrophilia: A Global Multidisciplinary Approach, eds. Lee Mellor, Anil Aggrawal & Eric W. Hickey. San Diego, California: Cognella.
- Mellor, L. 2017. "Necrophilia-Spectrum Behavior and the Thematic-Derivative Model of Sexual Progression", in Understanding Necrophilia: A Global Multidisciplinary Approach, eds. Lee Mellor, Anil Aggrawal & Eric W. Hickey. San Diego, California: Cognella.
- Mellor, L. 2017. "The Five Allures of Necrophilia", in Understanding Necrophilia: A Global Multidisciplinary Approach, eds. Lee Mellor, Anil Aggrawal & Eric W. Hickey. San Diego, California: Cognella.

== Music ==
As a musician, Mellor has been spotlighted and interviewed on CBC Radio, and in 2007 was voted among the top 10 singer-songwriters in Montreal. By the 2008 poll, he had risen to No. 3 singer-songwriter in the city, behind Leonard Cohen and Rufus Wainwright.

Mellor's debut album Ghost Town Heart was released independently on August 18, 2007. He is known for coining the term "citygrass" to describe Montreal's emerging alternative country scene.

In 2010, while working on his second album, Mellor also produced and played on Montreal singer-songwriter Roses's self-titled debut EP. A music video for "Suzy Blue Eyes" from his second album Lose was officially released on YouTube in early 2011.

Lose, described by Mellor as an album that he made "for himself", followed shortly afterwards on April 30, 2011.

Mellor also produced Kristen Bussandri's "Diamonds to Dust" EP, released in July 2011.

== Discography ==
- Ghost Town Heart (2007)
- Lose (2011)
