= Michael Wayne McGray =

Canadian serial killer (born 1965)

- Born: July 11, 1965 (age 61); Collingwood, Ontario Canada
- Conviction: Murder
- Penalty: Life imprisonment

Details
- Victims: 7–18+
- Span of crimes: 1985–1998
- Country: Canada; United States (alleged)

Michael Wayne McGray (born July 11, 1965) is a Canadian serial killer convicted of killing seven individuals between 1985 and 1998. He claims to have killed eleven others during the same time period.

== Early life ==
McGray was born in Collingwood, Ontario to Victor and Shirley McGray and was raised in Argyle, Nova Scotia.

== Crimes ==
On May 1, 1985, McGray murdered 17-year-old hitchhiker Elizabeth Gale Tucker in a wooded area near Weymouth, Nova Scotia. Tucker's body was found on October 6, 1985, by a hunter with his dog on a logging road near Grosses Coques. At the time, a Toronto man by the name of Gregory George Ashford was questioned in connection with this murder.

On November 14, 1987, McGray and two accomplices, Mark Gibbons and Norm Warren, robbed a taxi driver in Saint John, New Brunswick. After the police arrived, Gibbons' dead body was discovered at Market Square. Warren was charged with the murder of Gibbons; however, he was found not guilty of murder after a jury trial. McGray received a five-year prison sentence for his role in the robbery, but was not charged in connection with Gibbons' death.

McGray is suspected by some of murdering Alaskan medical student Philip Innes Fraser in 1988 though sources with the RCMP say they have ruled him out.

In 1991, McGray was still serving time in prison from his 1987 robbery conviction. However, he was given a three-day weekend pass to stay at a halfway house in Montreal, Quebec during the Easter weekend. On March 30, 1991, McGray met Robert Assaly in Montreal's Gay Village. Assaly invited McGray back to his apartment where McGray fatally stabbed him in the throat and chest multiple times. On March 31, 1991, McGray returned to the Gay Village and met Gaetan Ethier, who invited McGray back to his apartment. After spending the night at Ethier's apartment, McGray stabbed Ethier to death. McGray elected not to return to the prison after his three-day weekend pass but was found nearly two months later and re-arrested.

The National Parole Board expressed concern in 1995 about McGray's problems with anger and substance abuse and about McGray having disappeared for more than a year while on parole, "which clearly indicated a serious breach of trust and a blatant disregard for conditions of release."

On the morning of February 28, 1998, Joan Hicks and her 11-year-old daughter Nina in Moncton, New Brunswick were murdered at their apartment. Hicks was found lying on the floor of the bathroom in a pool of blood, having been beaten, strangled and with her throat cut with a serrated knife. Her daughter Nina was found hanging in her bedroom closet by a piece of rope after having been choked with a rope. McGray was identified by a witness as the murderer and was arrested the next day. He later confessed to the murders of Robert Assaly and Gaetan Ethier in 1991.

At some point after McGray was arrested, he confessed to being responsible for the 1985 disappearance of New Brunswick teenager, Kimberly Amero. She disappeared from the Atlantic National Exhibition in Saint John after staying behind to watch the fireworks. He admitted to killing her and burying her body on the Kingston Peninsula — a piece of land located between the St. John River and the Kennebecasis River. A thorough search of the land turned up no sign of Kimberly's supposed burial site.

On March 20, 2000, he pled guilty to the murder of Joan Hicks. McGray claimed to have killed 11 other victims across Canada, including Halifax, Saint John, Montreal, Ottawa, Toronto, Calgary, Vancouver, and the American city of Seattle. He claimed that he would provide information to the authorities on the killings in exchange for specific demands being met.

In May 2001, McGray was charged with a sixth murder, the 1985 killing of Elizabeth Gail Tucker in Nova Scotia. This charge occurred as a result of several interviews he gave the previous year; as a result of the interviews, police across the country re-opened cold case files. McGray blamed his urge to kill on beatings he received as a child and warned he would kill again if he did not receive proper treatments.

In November 2010, following a transfer to the Mountain Institution medium-security prison in Agassiz, British Columbia, McGray killed his cellmate, 33-year-old Jeremy Phillips. The Crown prosecutor related that McGray claimed that Phillips invented a false hostage-taking scenario where McGray would tie him up, and Phillips would then be brought to the infirmary; McGray complied with the plan at first but then strangled Phillips. Lawyers of the victim's family doubted the claims as Phillips was scheduled to be released on parole. Two inmates related that Phillips had requested to not be held in the same block as McGray, but prison officers denied the request. A resulting coroner's inquest recommended that serial killers be housed in single cells. The Ste-Anne-des-Plaines Institution, which was reputed to be the highest-security prison in Canada, housed McGray in 2012.

On July 12, 2019, the Nova Scotia Supreme Court revealed that McGray was the prime suspect in the 1995 murder of Brenda Way, who was found with her neck slashed in Dartmouth, Nova Scotia. Her boyfriend, Glen Assoun, had been convicted and spent 17 years in prison for the crime he always denied. Assoun's conviction was overturned.

== Timeline of events ==
The murders included random attacks of strangers and the killing of acquaintances.

1985

- 1 May – Murder of Elizabeth Gale Tucker, near Weymouth, Digby County Nova Scotia; she was a hitch hiker.

1987

- 14 November – Murder of Mark Daniel Gibbons, an alleged accomplice in Saint John, New Brunswick; stabbed.

1991

- 29 March – Given 3-day parole from Atlantic Institution, Renous, New Brunswick.
- 31 March – Murder of Robert Assaly; retired school teacher he met at a gay bar in Montreal while on parole; bludgeoned and stabbed.
- 1 April – Murder of Gaetan Ethier; met at a gay bar in Montreal while on parole; stabbed.
- Late May – Returned to prison in New Brunswick after eluding police for nearly 2 months.

1995

- November 12 (alleged) – As of 2019, prime suspect in murder of Brenda Way, Dartmouth, Nova Scotia.

1998

- 28 February – Murder of Joan Hicks and her 11-year-old daughter Nina in Moncton, New Brunswick; at their home.

1999

- March – Arrested in Moncton for murder of Joan and Nina Hicks.
- Fall – Charged in Montreal killings.

1999–2000

- Confesses to kidnapping and murdering Kimberly Ann Amero from Saint John, New Brunswick.

2000

- January – Charged in Saint John killing.
- 20 March – Pleaded guilty to the murder of Joan Hicks; denied murdering her child.
- 25 April – Sentenced to 20 years for Assaly and Ethier murders.

2010

- November – Murder of cellmate Jeremy Phillips at the Mountain Institution in British Columbia.

== See also ==
- List of serial killers by country
- List of serial killers by number of victims
