= Grosses Coques =

Community in Nova Scotia, Canada

Coordinates: 44°21′21.76″N 66°5′58.97″W

Grosses Coques in Nova Scotia

Grosses Coques is a community in the Canadian province of Nova Scotia, located in Digby County. The name of the community is French, and means "large shells".
