= Gerald Thomas Archer =

Canadian serial killer

- Born: 1932; London, Ontario, Canada
- Died: 1995 (aged 62–63); Ontario, Canada
- Other names: The Chambermaid Slayer; The London Chambermaid Killer; The London Chambermaid Slayer
- Spouse: Mary Archer (m. 1967)
- Children: 1
- Status: Deceased
- Motive: Sexual sadism
- Conviction: Non-capital murder
- Penalty: Life imprisonment with the possibility of parole

Details
- Victims: 3
- Span of crimes: 31 January 1969 – 23 January 1971
- Country: Canada
- Location: Ontario
- Date apprehended: February 1971

Gerald Thomas Archer (1932 – 1995) was a Canadian serial killer who was active in and around his hometown of London, Ontario from January 1969 to January 1971. Since all three of his confirmed victims were female hotel employees, he became known as "The London Chambermaid Slayer."

== Early life ==
Gerald Thomas Archer was born in London, Ontario in 1932 and by 1950 had a criminal record for offences which included robbery, breaking and entering, and possession. He began corresponding with a woman named Mary in 1966, and met her in person in December 1967. The two wed eleven days after their initial meeting and lived in Merlin until October 1970, when they moved to Adelaide Street South, Chatham.

== Murders ==
Jane Wooley, 62, was beaten and stabbed to death in her York Street, London apartment on 31 January 1969. Her body was discovered by a friend and the police on 3 February. She worked as a chambermaid at a Dundas Street hotel called the London House. Money was stolen from her purse and most of her clothing had been removed, which led investigators to conclude that she was killed by her assailant while he was in the midst of attempting to rape her.

Edith Authier, 57, was beaten and stabbed to death in her William Street, Merlin home on 4 September 1970. Her body was discovered the next day by her neighbour Mary Gray. She worked as a chambermaid at the William Pitt Hotel in Chatham, was sexually assaulted before being killed, and had money stolen from her purse.

Merrill Hotel chambermaid Belva Russell, 57, was beaten to death in her Adelaide Street South, Chatham apartment on 23 January 1971. Her body was discovered minutes after her death by her common-law husband Reginald Tomlinson, who bumped into an unfamiliar man running out of the building as he was entering it at around 2:00am. Most of Mrs. Russell's clothing had been removed, which led investigators to assume that she had been killed during a struggle with an assailant who had attempted to rape her.

== Arrest and trial ==
Archer was picked up for questioning over the death of Belva Russell by detectives on 12 February 1971, and was arrested and charged with the non-capital murder of Mrs. Russell after being fingerprinted and identified in a police line-up by Mr. Tomlinson. Archer's trial began in June, was held in Kent County, and was presided over by Mr. Justice W.F. Donahue. When the twelve-man jury finished deliberating and returned with a verdict of guilty, Archer responded to his sentence of life imprisonment by shouting, "That's only the first strike against me. The ball game isn't over yet!"

== Death ==
Archer was paroled in 1985, became a drifter, died of a heart attack in 1995, and had his unclaimed body buried in a potter's field. After his death, his estranged wife and daughter both came forward and informed the police that Archer had once drunkenly confessed to them that he had killed Edith Authier. Authorities exhumed Archer's remains in February 2000 to procure DNA samples, which matched DNA extracted from cigarette butts found near Jane Wooley's body.

== See also ==
- List of serial killers by country
