= William Patrick Fyfe =

Canadian serial killer

- Born: William Patrick Fyfe; February 27, 1955 (age 71); Toronto, Ontario, Canada
- Other name: "The Killer Handyman"
- Conviction: Murder
- Penalty: Life imprisonment

Details
- Victims: 5–9+
- Span of crimes: 17 October 1979 – 15 December 1999
- Country: Canada
- State: Quebec
- Date apprehended: 22 December 1999

William Patrick Fyfe (born February 27, 1955) is a Canadian serial killer convicted of killing five women in the Montreal area of Quebec, although he claims to have killed four others. He allegedly killed his first victim in 1979 at the age of 24.

== Early life ==
Billy Fyfe was born in Toronto, Ontario. He was raised by an aunt and in 1958 moved from central Canada to the Parc Extension area of Montreal. He lived as a normal child, although friends did have suspicions about the boy as he grew up. As an adult, he worked as a handyman.

== Murders ==
DNA evidence on the door frame at Mary Glen's house led police to charge Fyfe for the murders. The Ontario Provincial Police (OPP) arrested him on 22 December 1999, while he was returning to his pick-up truck after eating at a Husky Truck Stop near Barrie, Ontario. He has confessed to only a portion of the crimes that he is suspected of committing.

Fyfe's preliminary hearing began on 6 November 2000. Jean Lecours was the crown prosecutor heading up the case against Fyfe. He is now serving a life sentence in a maximum facility in Saskatchewan. The four last victims he admitted to only after being incarcerated.

He is also suspected by Montreal Police of being the serial rapist commonly known as "The Plumber" who was responsible for a string of violent rapes during the 1980s in downtown Montreal.

=== Known victims ===
- Hazel Scattolon, a 52-year-old woman who was stabbed to death and sexually assaulted in 1981 in Town of Mount Royal, Quebec.
- Anna Yarnold, a 59-year-old woman who was bludgeoned to death on 15 October 1999 in Senneville, Quebec.
- Monique Gaudreau, a 46-year-old woman who was stabbed to death on 29 October 1999 in Sainte-Agathe-des-Monts, Quebec.
- Teresa Shanahan, a 55-year-old woman who was stabbed to death in November 1999 in Laval, Quebec.
- Mary Glen, a 50-year-old woman who was beaten and stabbed to death on 15 December 1999 in Baie-D'Urfé, Quebec

=== Suspected victims ===
After his capture, Fyfe also hinted to killing:

- Suzanne Bernier, a 55-year-old woman murdered in Montreal's Ahuntsic-Cartierville borough on October 17, 1979.
- Nicole Raymond, a 26-year-old woman found stabbed to death in her apartment on November 11, 1979, in Pointe-Claire, Quebec.
- Louise Blanc Poupart, a woman found stabbed to death in her home in 1987 in Sainte-Adèle, Quebec.
- Pauline Laplante, a 44-year-old woman murdered in 1989 in Piedmont, Quebec.

== See also ==
- List of serial killers by country
