= Waypoint Centre for Mental Health Care =

Coordinates: 44.800804°N 79.929452°W

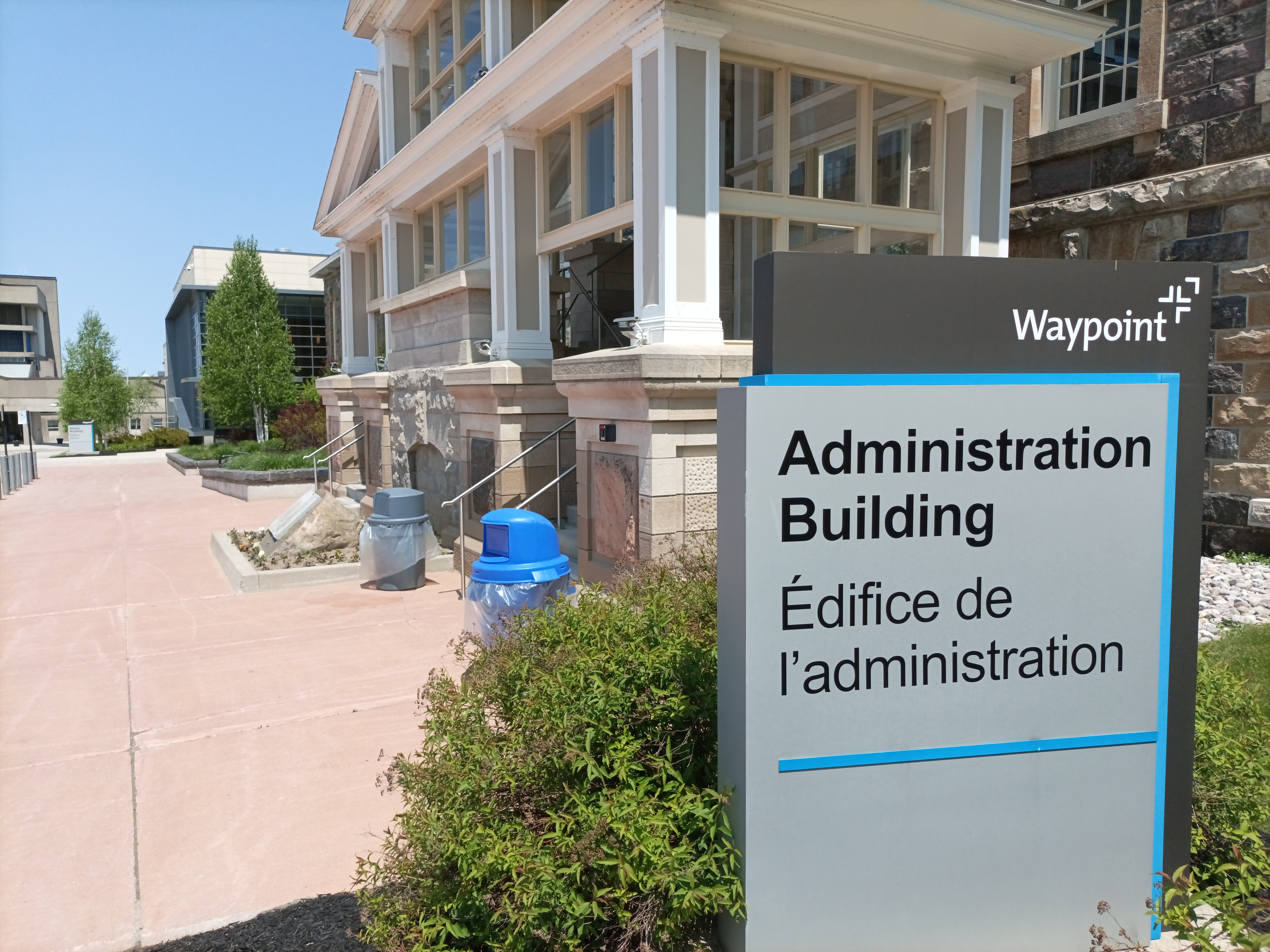
- Administration building at Waypoint Centre

Geography
- Location: Penetanguishene, Simcoe County, Ontario, Canada

Organization
- Care system: Public Medicare (Canada) (OHIP)
- Type: Specialist
- Affiliated university: University of Toronto

Services
- Beds: 321
- Specialty: Psychiatric hospital

History
- Founded: 15 August 1904

Links
- Website: Official website
- Lists: Hospitals in Canada

Waypoint Centre for Mental Health Care (French: Waypoint Centre de soins de santé mentale), formerly known as Mental Health Centre Penetanguishene, is a 321-bed hospital providing mental health, addictions and geriatric care, located on Georgian Bay in the Town of Penetanguishene, approximately 150 kilometres (93 mi) north of Toronto. Waypoint provides both acute and longer-term mental health, addiction and geriatric inpatient and outpatient care to Simcoe County, Dufferin County, Muskoka and Parry Sound. In addition, Waypoint is home to the Waypoint Research Institute and operates Ontario’s only high secure forensic mental health units, serving patients involved in both the mental health and justice systems. It is a community-affiliated hospital of the University of Toronto. It is also the largest employer in North Simcoe Region.

== History ==
The hospital was founded in 1904, taking over a building previously used by the Boys Reformatory of Upper Canada. In 1933 the first four wards of the Oak Ridge building were built. The hospital was named Ontario Hospital.

1933 – The first patient units in the Oak Ridge building open. The hospital is known during this period as Ontario Hospital.

2008 – The hospital, then called the Penetanguishene Mental Health Centre, is divested from the Ontario government and renamed Waypoint Centre for Mental Health Care, under the sponsorship of Catholic Health Sponsors of Ontario.

In 2014 the new Waypoint Centre for Mental Health Care building was opened on the site of the old Oak Ridge building. The Oak Ridge building was demolished to make space for the new forensic mental health facility.

== Services ==
=== Mental health ===
Waypoint is one of four specialized mental health hospitals in Ontario. It is also the sole provider of high-secure forensic mental health services, meaning it serves some of the province’s most complex and disadvantaged populations. The hospital’s work to advance understanding of mental health care includes a focus on clarifying misperceptions about mental health.

=== Addictions ===
Waypoint’s program in mental health and addictions care improves lives and brings hope to people with mental illness and substance use issues, as well as their families and care partners. While helping patients overcome their struggles is the main priority, another important goal is eliminating the stigma attached to addiction.

=== Geriatrics ===
Waypoint’s Horizon Program for Geriatric Psychiatry serves patients 65 or over with signs and symptoms of a psychiatric disorder, as well as persons under 65 with Alzheimer’s or other forms of dementia. Physicians, nurses, social workers, recreational therapists, behaviour support specialists, occupational therapists and physiotherapists oversee patient care.

=== Community mental health services (outpatient care) ===
Outpatient programs are community-based mental health services available to community members experiencing a variety of mental health challenges. These programs offer support in collaboration with primary care providers and regional partners, focusing on recovery, assessment, stabilization, therapy and community support. They include:

- North Simcoe Muskoka Specialized Geriatric Services: NSM SGS cares for frail older adults so they can live independently and comfortably within their homes or community settings. NSM SGS provides hospital- and community-based health care services that support these adults and their caregivers. The organization’s mandate includes system leadership, clinical service, education and mentorship, research and ethics, and advocacy.
- Ontario Structured Psychotherapy Program: OSP provides treatment for depression, trauma and anxiety-related concerns for anyone in Ontario who is 18 or older. It is publicly funded and offers access to evidence-based, cognitive-behavioural therapy (CBT) and related approaches. CBT is a structured, time-limited therapy that is problem-focused and goal-oriented and teaches practical strategies and skills. Services are delivered in person or online.
- Family, Child and Youth Mental Health Program: This program provides community-based care for the full spectrum of mental health conditions to children and youths 17 years of age or younger. The consultative service typically consists of one or two visits by a physician and potential follow-up with a clinician. The clinical team consists of physicians, nurses, a social worker and support staff who collaborate with community-based mental health agencies, regional hospitals and primary care providers to assist children, youths and their caregivers.

Other services for outpatients include the Neuromodulation Program, the Mobile Treatment and Support Team, Rehabilitation Services, Waypoint at Home, and the Outpatient Assessment and Treatment Service.

=== Inpatient care ===
Inpatient Services at Waypoint offer specialized and comprehensive assessment and treatment to individuals suffering from complex or persistent mental health issues. Programs include:

- Georgianwood Program for Concurrent Disorders: For adults experiencing both a mental illness and substance use issue at the same time, which together are called concurrent disorders.
- Sans Souci Program for Transition and Recovery: Specializes in the care of individuals with severe and persistent mental illness.
- Forensic High-Secure: Consisting of four programs, Provincial Forensic programs serve men who have come in contact with the law and are also suffering from mental health concerns.

Other services for inpatients include the Horizon Program for Geriatric Psychiatry, the Bayview Program for Dual Diagnosis and the Brébeuf Program for Regional Forensics.

== Partnerships ==
Waypoint partners with more than 50 organizations regionally and provincially to better deliver integrated care and to inform health policy-making. Major partnerships include:

Sunnybrook Hospital – partnering in the provision of repetitive transcranial magnetic stimulation (rTMS) delivery, a form of neuromodulation.

Homelessness, Addictions, Recovery and Treatment (HART) Hub of Simcoe – a regionally-based, partnership to coordinate and deliver care for people at risk of, or experiencing, homelessness who are struggling with mental illness and addiction

Minookmii (Sacred Tracks Upon The Earth). This free program offers cognitive behavioural therapy that weaves together Indigenous ways of knowing and cultural interventions with evidence-based practices. Minookmii is not only supporting people with their recovery, but also transforming how mental health services are delivered.

== Research ==
The Waypoint Research Institute conducts research into many aspects of mental health and addictions care. The Institute currently has 92 research collaborations underway, working with organizations such as the Ontario Shores Centre for Mental Health Sciences, the Royal Ottawa Health Care Group, the Centre for Addiction and Mental Health, and St. Joseph’s Healthcare. It also maintains formal academic research partnerships with the University of Toronto, McMaster University, York University, Toronto Metropolitan University and Georgian College.

In 2025, researchers Dr. Zoe Hilton, Elke Ham and team received the Governor General’s Innovation Award for their work in the development of a data-driven tool to predict and assess the risk of intimate partner violence, one of only six such awards given nationally.

Other fields of inquiry include the use of artificial intelligence and machine learning, patient-centered care, intimate partner and gender-based violence, and youth mental health. Researcher, Dr. Andrea Waddell and team, developed the first AI-driven tool in North America for predicting the risk of harm, helping healthcare teams to intervene in a timely manner.

== Media coverage ==
In a 2026 four-part series, "20 Years in Isolation", the Toronto Star revealed an abusive use of seclusion at the facility; experts describe the Waypoint Centre’s isolation practice as "egregious,” "grossly in excess", and "completely inconsistent with recovery-oriented, trauma-informed care."

== Awards ==
Accredited With Exemplary Standing, Accreditation Canada

Gold Level, ‘Mental Health at Work’ certification, Canada Awards for Excellence

== Notable staff ==
- Wayne G. King (born 1951), ice hockey winger; worked as a security guard and mental health worker
- Vernon Quinsey (born 1944), psychologist
