= Monkeyshines (disambiguation) =

Monkeyshines is an 1889 series of experimental short films.

Monkeyshine is another word for childish pranks or tricks.

Monkeyshines or Monkey Shines may also refer to:

- Monkeyshines!, a 1981 video game for the Magnavox Odyssey²
- Monkey Shines, a 1983 horror novel by Micheal Stewart
- Monkey Shines (film), a 1988 horror film directed by George A. Romero
