= Robert Evans =

American film producer (1930–2019)

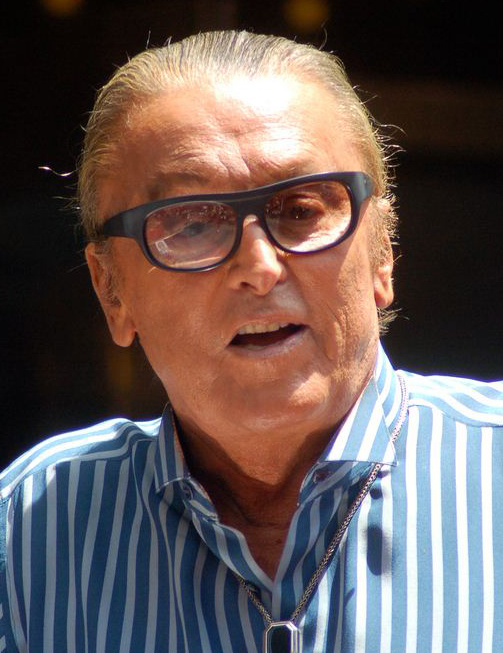
- Evans in 2012
- Born: Robert Shapera; June 29, 1930; New York City, U.S.
- Died: October 26, 2019 (aged 89); Beverly Hills, California, U.S.
- Resting place: Ferncliff Cemetery
- Occupations: Film producer, studio executive, actor
- Years active: 1952–2016
- Notable work: Rosemary's Baby; Love Story; The Godfather; Chinatown
- Spouses: Sharon Hugueny (m. 1961; div. 1962) Camilla Sparv (m. 1964; div. 1967) Ali MacGraw (m. 1969; div. 1973) Phyllis George (m. 1977; div. 1978) Catherine Oxenberg (m. 1998; ann. 1998) Leslie Ann Woodward (m. 2002; div. 2004) Victoria, Lady White (m. 2005; div. 2006)
- Children: Josh Evans

Robert Evans (born Robert Shapera; June 29, 1930 – October 26, 2019) was an American film producer, studio executive, and actor who worked on Rosemary's Baby (1968), Love Story (1970), The Godfather (1972), and Chinatown (1974).

Evans began his career in a successful business venture with his brother Charles Evans, selling women's apparel. In 1956, while on a business trip, he was spotted by actress Norma Shearer "poolside at the Beverly Hilton"; Shearer thought he would be right to play the role of her late husband Irving Thalberg in Man of a Thousand Faces (1957). Thus he began a brief film acting career.

In 1962, Evans went into film producing instead, using his accumulated wealth from the clothing business, and began a meteoric rise in the industry. Receiving a break based on a friendship, Evans was named as Paramount Pictures' vice-president in charge of production in 1966, and executive vice president over worldwide production in 1969. While there, he improved the ailing Paramount's fortunes through a string of commercially and critically acclaimed films. In 1974, he stepped down to produce films on his own.

In 1980, Evans's career, and life, took a downturn after he pled guilty to cocaine trafficking. Over the next 12 years, he produced only two films, both financial flops: The Cotton Club (1984) and the Chinatown sequel The Two Jakes (1990). From 1993 onward he produced films on a more regular basis, with a mixed track record that included both flops (such as Jade in 1995) and hits (such as How to Lose a Guy in 10 Days in 2003, his final film credit).

== Early life and acting career ==
Evans was born in New York City, the son of Florence (née Krasne), a housewife who came from a wealthy family, and Archie Shapera, a dentist in Harlem. He described both of his parents as "second-generation Jews". He grew up on New York City's Upper West Side during the 1930s, where he was better off than most people living during the Great Depression.

In 1944, Evans's father asked his sons to change their last name to their grandmother's maiden name of "Evan", as she had only a short time to live. The brothers agreed, but added an "s", to make the name sound more American.

In his early years, he did promotional work for Evan-Picone, a fashion company founded by his brother Charles. After high school, he did a variety of voice work on radio. With a clear, deep voice as a teenager and a knack for foreign accents, by his estimation he performed in more than 300 radio shows before he turned 18. This included a leading role on The Aldrich Family situation comedy.

He was spotted by actress Norma Shearer next to the pool at The Beverly Hills Hotel on November 6, 1956. She successfully touted him for the role of her late husband Irving Thalberg in Man of a Thousand Faces. The same year, Evans also caught the eye of Darryl F. Zanuck, who cast him as Pedro Romero in the 1957 film adaptation of Ernest Hemingway's The Sun Also Rises, against the wishes of co-star Ava Gardner and Hemingway himself. In 1959, he appeared in Twentieth Century-Fox's production of The Best of Everything with Hope Lange, Diane Baker and Joan Crawford.

== Career as producer ==
Dissatisfied with his own acting talent, he was determined to become a producer. He purchased the rights to a 1966 novel titled The Detective and flirted with playing the lead role himself while producing. But soon thereafter, Evans sold the book’s option to producer Fred Kohlmar, who eventually made the film with director Mark Robson for Twentieth Century-Fox in 1968. Peter Bart, a writer for The New York Times, wrote an article about Evans's aggressive production style.

As Richard Natale and Carmel Dagan report in their obituary, Evan befriended Gulf+Western of Charles Bluhdorn, the owner of Paramount Pictures at that time, "born salesman recogniz[ing] another born salesman" when the two met; in a controversial move, Bluhdorn hired Evans as "vice-president in charge of production" in 1966. Despite being a neophyte in that role, Evans was successful enough to be named Executive Vice President over worldwide production, only three years later. This shakeup at Paramount Pictures included the hiring of Bart, whom Evans recruited to serve as a Paramount executive.

We didn't strive for commercial. We went for original. We fell on our asses on some of them, but we also touched magic.

— Robert Evans, 2002

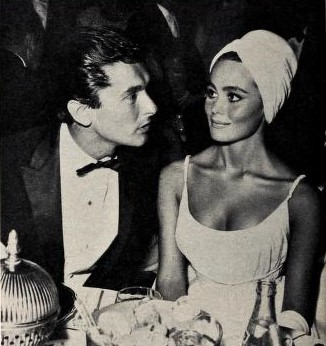
Evans with his first wife Sharon Hugueny, 1961

When Evans took over as head of production for Paramount, the floundering studio was the ninth largest. Despite his inexperience, Evans was able to turn the studio around, making Paramount the most successful studio in Hollywood, and transforming it into a profitable enterprise for Gulf+Western. During his tenure at Paramount, the studio turned out films such as:

- Barefoot in the Park (1967)
- Romeo and Juliet (1968)
- Rosemary's Baby (1968)
- The Odd Couple (1968)
- The Italian Job (1969)
- True Grit (1969)
- Love Story (1970)
- On a Clear Day You Can See Forever (1970)
- Harold and Maude (1971)
- The Godfather (1972)
- Save the Tiger (1973)
- Serpico (1973)
- Chinatown (1974)
- The Conversation (1974)
- The Great Gatsby (1974)
- The Godfather Part II (1974)

and many others.

Dissatisfied with his financial compensation and desiring to produce films under his own banner, Evans struck a deal with Paramount in 1972 that enabled him to stay on as executive vice president of worldwide production, while also working as an independent producer on five films. Other producers at Paramount felt this gave Evans an unfair advantage. After the huge critical and commercial success of the Evans-produced Chinatown, he stepped down as global production chief, which enabled him to produce films on his own. From 1976 to 1980, working as an independent producer, he continued his streak of successful films with:

- Marathon Man (1976)
- Black Sunday (1977)
- Popeye (1980)
- Urban Cowboy (1980)

After 1980, his film output became both more infrequent and less critically acclaimed. He produced only two films over the next twelve years: The Cotton Club (1984), and The Two Jakes (1990). From 1993 to 2003 he produced the films and series:

- Sliver (1993)
- Jade (1995)
- The Phantom (1996)
- The Saint (1997)
- How to Lose a Guy in 10 Days (2003)
- Kid Notorious (2003),

the last of which an animated series, for Comedy Central, in which he voiced his eponymous character.

In 2004 Evans hosted a Sirius Satellite Radio show, In Bed with Robert Evans. In 2009, Evans was in talks to produce a film about auto executive John DeLorean, as well as an HBO miniseries titled The Devil and Sidney Korshak. Neither project came to fruition.

In July 2019 Paramount did not renew its contract with Robert Evans Productions, after Evans stepped down from running the studio, a contract that had been in place since 1974. Evans had a staff of three and had been working from his Woodland estate in Beverly Hills because of poor health.

== Drug-related legal entanglements ==
"I had 10 years of a horrific life, Kafkaesque. There were nights I cried myself to sleep."

— Robert Evans, The New York Times interview (1993)

Evans was arrested after allegedly engineering a large cocaine buy with his brother Charles. He entered a guilty plea to a misdemeanor in federal court and was convicted of cocaine trafficking in 1980. As part of his plea bargain, he filmed an anti-drug TV commercial. The misdemeanor was later wiped from his record, and Evans continued to deny being involved in dealing—arguing that he never should have been convicted of the federal charges of sale and distribution, as he was only a user. He told the Philadelphia Inquirer in a 1994 interview, "Bob 'Cocaine' Evans is how I'll be known to my grave".

=== Cotton Club murder ===
In the early 1980s, Evans was introduced to theatrical impresario Roy Radin, a producer of traveling musical and comedy revues, by cocaine dealer Karen Greenberger (aka Lanie Jacobs). Radin was trying to break into the film industry with a movie about the legendary New York nightclub, the Cotton Club. The deal arranged on the film The Cotton Club mandated that Evans and Radin establish a production company in which each would own 45% of the film with the remaining 10% split between two other parties. Radin offered Greenberger (aka Jacobs) a $50,000 finder's fee for her efforts, which she found unsatisfactory.

As The Cotton Club film financing was being arranged, the 33-year-old Radin was murdered in 1983. Contract killer William Mentzer was among four people sentenced for shooting Radin multiple times in the head and using dynamite to make identification by authorities more challenging. At the trial, Greenberger was convicted of second-degree murder and kidnapping. Her involvement was said to be over a fear of being cut out of a producer's role and potential profits from the film. As a result, the trial was dubbed the "Cotton Club" murder trial.

Heeding the advice of his attorney Robert Shapiro, Evans refused to testify during a May 1989 preliminary hearing, invoking the Fifth Amendment to avoid incriminating himself. Police reports that had been submitted to obtain search warrants indicated at least two witnesses said Evans was involved in the Radin murder.

Greenberger testified during her 1991 trial that Evans was not involved in the murder. She also claimed during her trial that she had been Evans's lover.

== Personal life ==
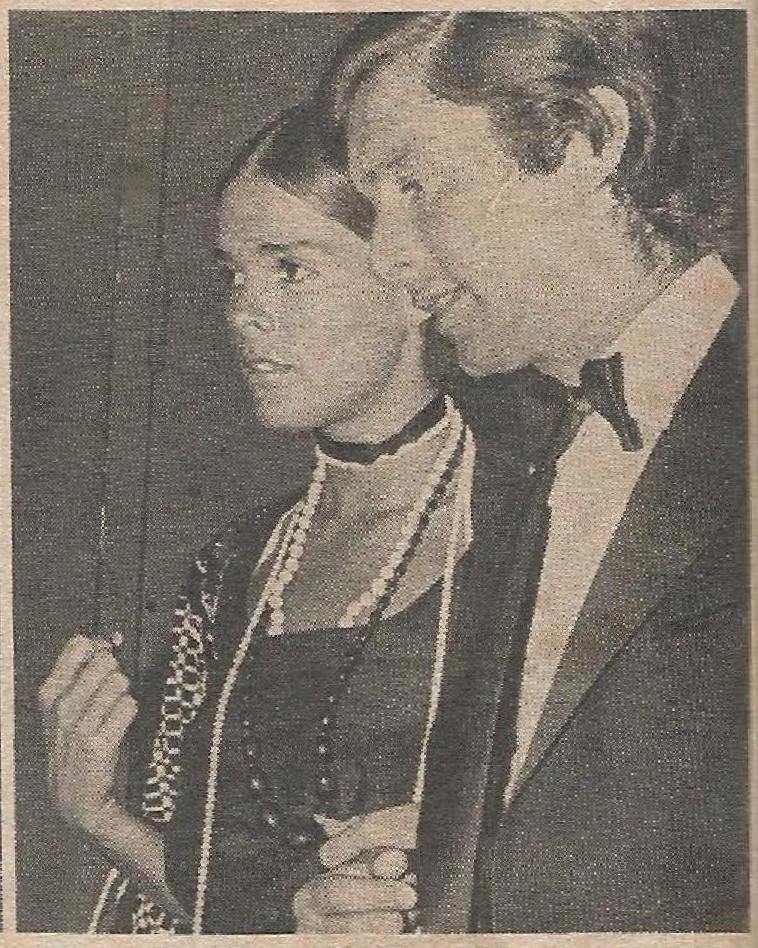
Robert Evans (right) with his actress wife Ali MacGraw in 1972

Evans married seven times. He first married Sharon Hugueny in 1961, staying with her until 1962. Subsequently, he married Camilla Sparv (1964–1967), Ali MacGraw (1969–1973), Phyllis George (1977–1978), Catherine Oxenberg (1998), Leslie Ann Woodward (2002–2004), and Victoria White (2005–2006). Evans's marriage to Oxenberg was annulled after nine days. He married his seventh wife, Victoria White O'Gara (widow of Lord White), while in Mexico, in August 2005 shortly after his 75th birthday. She filed for divorce on June 16, 2006, citing irreconcilable differences.

Evans had one child, Josh Evans, from his marriage to MacGraw. Josh is a film producer.

Evans's brother Charles Evans (1926–2007) was a businessman involved in clothing, real estate, promoting fire detectors and was also an occasional film producer (Tootsie, 1982, Monkey Shines, 1988 and Showgirls, 1995). His nephew is broadcast journalist Michael Shure. Another nephew is Charles Evans, Jr. a documentary producer. His sister, Alice Shure, who was associate producer on Without a Trace (1983), has produced other films, and founded documentary film production companies.

=== Health and death ===
On May 6, 1998, during a dinner party in honor of director Wes Craven, Evans suffered a stroke while giving a toast, and was rushed to nearby Cedars-Sinai Medical Center. Evans flatlined in the ambulance, but was resuscitated. Suffering a series of three strokes in quick succession, he was left paralyzed on his right side and completely unable to speak. During his hospital stay, he was encouraged by media mogul and friend Sumner Redstone, who stayed at his bedside, to work on his speech and recovery. A few days after Evans's stroke, Frank Sinatra died from a heart attack in one of the adjoining rooms at Cedars-Sinai Medical Center. Witnessing his body being taken away, Evans said it was an event that furthered his desire to recover.

Evans eventually regained his ability to talk and returned to producing. From 2013, he relied on a cane for shorter walks and had limited mobility.

Evans died in Beverly Hills, California on October 26, 2019, at the age of 89.

== In popular culture ==
- Orson Welles' final film, The Other Side of the Wind (filmed 1970–1976; released 2018), a satire of 1970s Hollywood, has a young studio boss, "Max David", played by Geoffrey Land, who Welles admitted was a spoof of Evans.
- The character David Blackman in Blake Edwards' 1981 film S.O.B., played by Robert Vaughn, is based on Evans.
- Evans felt that Dustin Hoffman's portrayal of Mumbles, a mobster, in the 1990 film Dick Tracy, was based on Evans's speaking style.
- In the 1997 film Wag the Dog, a Washington, D.C. spin doctor distracts the US electorate from a presidential sex scandal by hiring a Hollywood producer, again played by Hoffman, whose character was an open parody of Evans. Hoffman emulated Evans's work habits, mannerisms, quirks, clothing style, hairstyle, and his large square-framed eyeglasses. The real Evans is said to have declared, "I'm magnificent in this film!"
- The character Bob Ryan, portrayed by Martin Landau in the HBO series Entourage, who was a successful movie producer in the 1970s and now chafes at no longer being considered a major Hollywood player, was thought by some (including Evans himself) to be based on Evans. However, series creator Doug Ellin denied this, saying that he wrote the part based on someone he met while making Kissing a Fool, not on Evans. Nevertheless, Evans reportedly received an offer to play the part himself (which he declined), and his house was used in the show as Bob Ryan's home.
- Evans served as the inspiration for a Mr. Show sketch in which Bob Odenkirk portrays God recording his memoirs, dressed as and speaking like Evans. Odenkirk also attributes Evans as his primary influence on his portrayal of lawyer Saul Goodman in Breaking Bad.
- Joe Eszterhas in his book, Hollywood Animal, writes that "all lies ever told anywhere about Robert Evans are true." His autobiography also goes into detail about a cocaine addiction that plagued Evans in the 1980s.
- Evans played himself in the film An Alan Smithee Film: Burn Hollywood Burn (1998).
- Evans voiced a fictionalized caricature of himself in the animated series, Kid Notorious, alongside his real-life butler, Alan "English" Selka, and next-door neighbor, former Guns N' Roses lead guitarist Saul "Slash" Hudson.
- Evans appears in the 2005 Bruce Campbell novel Make Love! The Bruce Campbell Way, with Campbell impersonating him to infiltrate the Paramount Studios lot.
- In 2010, Smuggler Films acquired the stage rights to Evans's memoirs, The Kid Stays in the Picture, and its sequel, The Fat Lady Sang (which was published in 2013). The play was to be written by Jon Robin Baitz. No further information has been released on the production.
- Bill Hader played a character inspired by Evans in the two-part season two finale of Documentary Now! that parodies The Kid Stays in the Picture.
- Michael Douglas played a character that parodies Evans in the 2009 romantic comedy Ghosts of Girlfriends Past.
- Matthew Goode portrays Evans in the 2022 Paramount+ miniseries The Offer which dramatizes the making of The Godfather.
- In The Boys, Paul Reiser plays a retired producer based on Robert Evans.
- In The Studio, Bryan Cranston's character, Griffin Mill, is inspired by Evans. (Mill is referred to as a "dime store Bob Evans.")

== Filmography ==
=== Film ===
| Year | Film | Notes, Ref. |
|---|---|---|
| 1974 | Chinatown | |
| 1976 | Marathon Man | |
| 1977 | Black Sunday | |
| 1979 | Players | |
| 1980 | Urban Cowboy | |
| 1980 | Popeye | |
| 1984 | The Cotton Club | |
| 1990 | The Two Jakes | |
| 1993 | Sliver | |
| 1995 | Jade | |
| 1996 | The Phantom | |
| 1997 | The Saint | |
| 1999 | The Out-of-Towners | |
| 2003 | How to Lose a Guy in 10 Days | |

As head of production at Paramount

| Year | Film | Notes, Ref. |
|---|---|---|
| 1967 | The President's Analyst | |
| 1967 | Barefoot in the Park | |
| 1968 | The Odd Couple | |
| 1968 | The Detective | |
| 1968 | Rosemary's Baby | |
| 1969 | The Italian Job | |
| 1969 | True Grit | |
| 1970 | The Confession | |
| 1970 | Love Story | |
| 1971 | A New Leaf | |
| 1971 | Plaza Suite | |
| 1971 | Harold and Maude | |
| 1972 | The Godfather | |
| 1973 | Serpico | |
| 1973 | Save the Tiger | |
| 1974 | The Great Gatsby | |
| 1974 | The Conversation | |

As studio executive

| Year | Film | Notes, Ref. |
|---|---|---|
| 1972 | The Godfather | Uncredited |
| 1974 | The Godfather Part II | Uncredited |

As an actor

| Year | Film | Role | Notes, Ref. |
|---|---|---|---|
| 1952 | Lydia Bailey | Soldier | |
| 1954 | The Egyptian | Minor Role | Uncredited |
| 1957 | Man of a Thousand Faces | Irving Thalberg | |
| 1957 | The Sun Also Rises | Pedro Romero | |
| 1958 | The Fiend Who Walked the West | Felix Griffin | |
| 1959 | The Best of Everything | Dexter Key | |
| 1996 | Cannes Man | Producer | |
| 1997 | An Alan Smithee Film: Burn Hollywood Burn | Himself | |
| 2002 | The Kid Stays in the Picture | Himself | |
| 2013 | The Girl from Nagasaki | U.S. Consul | |

Miscellaneous crew

| Year | Film | Role | Notes, Ref. |
|---|---|---|---|
| 1968 | Rosemary's Baby | Developer | Uncredited |

Thanks

| Year | Film | Notes, Ref. |
|---|---|---|
| 1998 | Exposé | Special thanks to |
| 2003 | Wonderland | The producers and director wish to thank |
| 2005 | One Among Us | Special thanks |
| 2008 | Iscariot | Special thanks |
| 2011 | Tower Heist | Special thanks |
| 2015 | The Haunting of Pearson Place | Inspired by |

=== Television ===
| Year | Title | Credit | Notes, Ref. |
|---|---|---|---|
| 2003 | Kid Notorious | Executive producer | |
| 2012 | HEYBABE!!! | | Television short |
| 2016 | Urban Cowboy | Executive producer | Television pilot |

As an actor

| Year | Title | Role | Notes, Ref. |
|---|---|---|---|
| 2000 | The Simpsons | Himself | Voice role |
| 2000 | Just Shoot Me! | Himself | |
| 2003 | Kid Notorious | Kid Notorious | Voice role |

As writer

| Year | Title | Notes, Ref. |
|---|---|---|
| 2003 | Kid Notorious | |

Thanks

| Year | Title | Notes, Ref. |
|---|---|---|
| 2008 | The Dawn Reese Show | Special thanks |

== Publications ==
- The Kid Stays in the Picture – Hyperion Books, 1994, autobiography, also released as a 1994 audiobook read by Evans; adapted as a 2002 documentary film
- The Fat Lady Sang – It Books, 2013, publication date November 22, 2013, ISBN 9780062286048
