= Sharon Hugueny =

American actress (1944–1996)

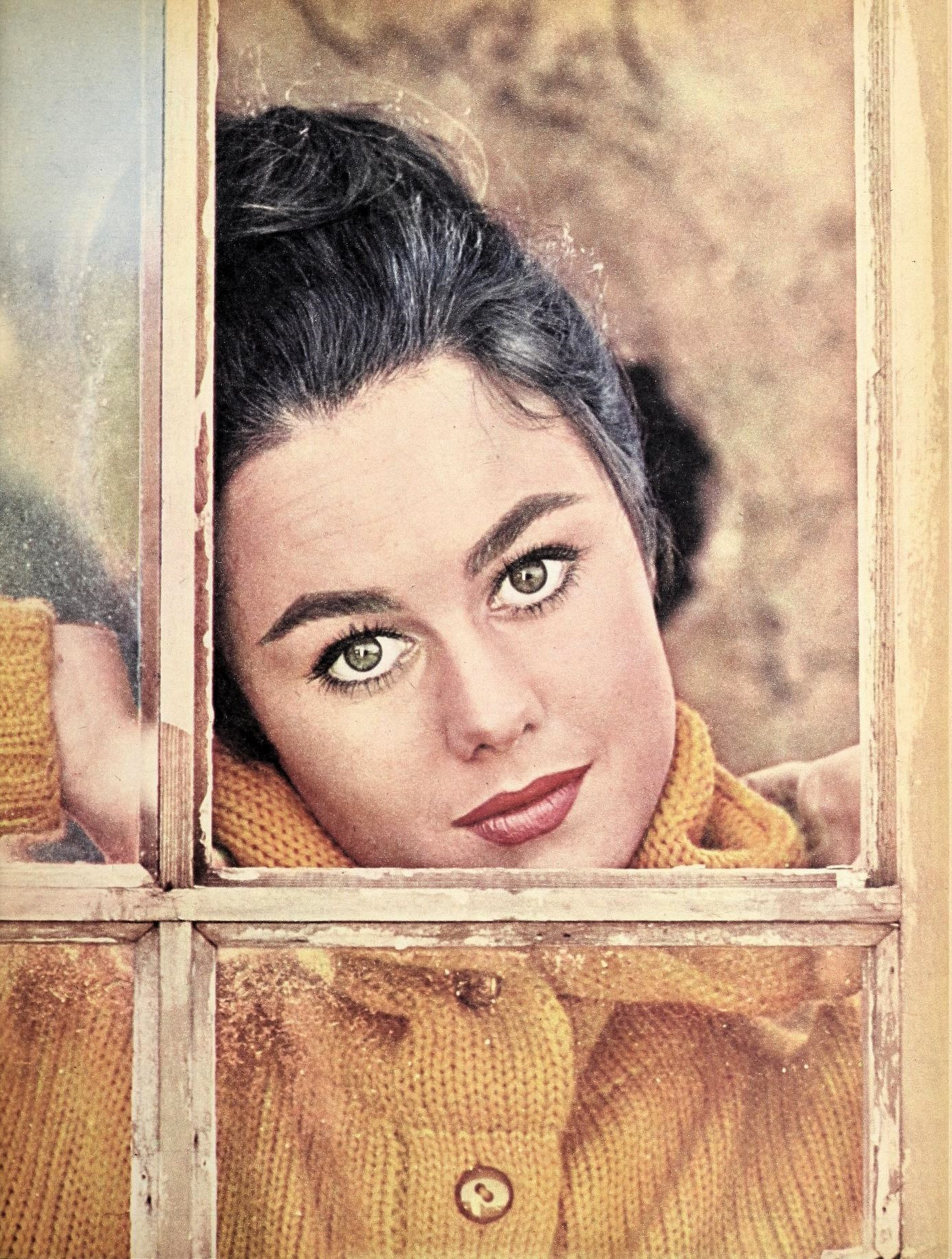
- Hugueny in 1961
- Born: Sharon Elizabeth Hugueny; February 29, 1944; Los Angeles, California, U.S.
- Died: July 3, 1996 (aged 52); Lake Arrowhead, California, U.S.
- Occupation: Actress
- Years active: 1959–1974
- Spouses: Robert Evans (m. 1961; div. 1962) Raymond Ross (m. 1968; div. 1974) Gordon Cornell Layne (m. 1976)
- Children: 1

Sharon Elizabeth Hugueny (February 29, 1944 – July 3, 1996) was an American actress who had a brief film and television career during the 1960s, appearing in 19 TV episodes and four feature films, the last of which co-starred her alongside Peter Fonda as one of the title characters in the 1964 drama The Young Lovers. Other than a single TV guest shot in 1974, she had been away from the cameras for nearly a decade, when an attempted return to filmmaking was cut short by a crippling automobile accident in 1977.

== Early years ==
Born on a leap day in Los Angeles, Hugueny became interested in the arts, particularly acting, in her early teens. She took language and ballet classes, had written a play at age 14 and, a year later, in 1959, was attending San Fernando Valley State College as a student in its Teenage Drama Workshop. Having co-starred in a staging of Madge Miller's Chinese fantasy, Land of the Dragon, she was seen in the Workshop's production of James Leo Herlihy's Broadway play about teen pregnancy, Blue Denim, by the head of Warner Bros. talent department, Solly Baiano who, with her parents' permission, arranged a meeting with producer-director Delmer Daves, then in the midst of preparing Parrish, a big-budget vehicle for the studio's new heartthrob, Troy Donahue.

Describing her as "a lovely little Madonna with black hair and deep blue eyes", Daves concluded that she presented the desired appearance and personality to be one of Donahue's romantic conquests in the film, and introduced her to studio head Jack L. Warner, who saw to it that a contract-signing ceremony was ready for February 29, 1960, her sixteenth birthday.

== Warner Bros. contractee ==
1960 was a very busy year for Warner Bros. which had a large roster of contract performers appearing in an assembly-line-style mass production of TV episodes and theatrical features. In the eight-year period between 1955 and 1963, the studio's TV arm, Warner Bros. Television, provided ABC network with 19 shows, including eight western and four detective series. Hugueny was enrolled in the studio's school to continue her education and was also immediately put to work, appearing over the next two years in 12 installments of six Warners' series as well as playing supporting roles in two features. During this period her career was sidelined by a brief marriage to Warners contractee Robert Evans and a move with him to New York City.

Her TV acting debut came on May 4, 1960, a little over two months after the contract signing, in the episode "Shadow of the Blade", broadcast near the end of the first season of the popular detective series, Hawaiian Eye, which gave her top billing among the guest cast, with her second appearance coming three weeks later, on the 24th, playing an Indian maiden named Running Deer, in "Attack", one of the last installments of the half-hour western, Colt .45. In June and July, she was on location, amidst the tobacco fields of Connecticut farm country, as well as in Hartford and at the submarine base in New London, alongside the cast and crew of Parrish, with filming completed on July 24.

She was one of ten young actresses designated Hollywood Deb Stars who appeared on the October 3 Bob Hope Special and, on October 14, was seen in "The Wide Screen Caper" episode of the studio's highest-rated detective series, 77 Sunset Strip, playing an up-and-coming starlet named Sprite Simpson and, a month later, portrayed another Native American girl, "Chantay", the title character in the November 13 segment of yet another half-hour western series, Lawman, which romantically paired her character with one of the studio's second-tier teen heartthrobs, Peter Brown, who co-starred as the show's young deputy, Johnny McKay.

Her last 1960 TV appearance was as Irish lass Deidre Fogarty whose sympathies lay with "The Bold Fenian Men", the December 18 episode of Warners' most highly-rated western, Maverick. The plot arranged still another romantic character pairing for her, with episode star Roger Moore in the role of cousin Beauregard "Beau" Maverick, who is taken by the Fenians to be their visiting compatriot Beau O'Maverick, giving the U.S. Army an opportunity to take advantage of the misunderstanding and instruct Beau to go along with the charade in hopes of uncovering a suspected plan by the conspirators to invade Canada. Employing a distinctive Irish accent, Hugueny received a substantial amount of screen time punctuated by several closeups. At about the same time, a brief news item publicized that "[S]ixteen-year-old Sharon Hugueny who makes her film debut with Troy Donahue in Warners' "Parrish," has already written her autobiography—a by-line piece which will be published in the January issue of the General Motors Corporation magazine.

1961 was a tumultuous year for her — in addition to appearing in another four episodes as well as a major feature film — she married Robert Evans in May, went with him to New York, thus effectively being suspended from her Warners contract, then divorced him in November and returned to Hollywood.

Her first series episode, "A Touch of Velvet", was broadcast January 11, in the middle of Hawaiian Eye's second season, and provided her with the heavily dramatic role of blind girl Ellie Collins who helps one of the show's detectives, Tracy Steele (Anthony Eisley), catch a killer and, in the process, develops feelings for him. On March 3, she was in the "Tiger by the Tail" installment of 77 Sunset Strip, playing Sari, the daughter of a visiting Middle Eastern prince who reciprocates declarations of love from Kookie (Edward Byrnes), the show's resident teen heartthrob. Her last 1961 episodes, April 16 and 23, representing a two-part story on Maverick, "The Devil's Necklace", cast her as yet another Indian girl, Tawny, who falls in love with that episode's Maverick, Bart (Jack Kelly), repeating to him the phrase, "me friend".

== Major role in Parrish ==
The following month brought big changes for Hugueny — May 4 was the release date for the studio's 2 hour-18 minute multi-star Technicolor production, Parrish, in which she is seventh-billed, playing Paige, the daughter of tobacco farm tycoon Karl Malden. The brunette Paige competes for and wins the heart of Troy Donahue's title character against two blondes, Hawaiian Eye regular Connie Stevens and Diane McBain, Donahue's co-star in another Warners detective series, Surfside 6. The three young actresses had substantial supporting roles and, in the film's publicity releases, were described as co-stars. The film, budgeted at $1,500,000, was a major hit, bringing in $4,200,000 in U.S. rentals alone, but the critics were dismissive, with The New York Times' Bosley Crowther mentioning "Sharon Hugueny as the farmer's daughter who grows up to be sublimely marriageable…. in the slick fiction tradition" and demeaning the film as "synthetic" and "artificial", while saying of its characters that "[N]ot one of them is representative of credible humanity".

== Marriage to Robert Evans ==
In his 1994 autobiography The Kid Stays in the Picture, then actor and future producer Robert Evans describes how he met Hugueny on the set of Parrish where "she was Warner Brothers' entry as the next Elizabeth Taylor". According to Evans she was "being protected as if she were the Hope diamond" and "so pure I felt guilty kissing her". In May 1961, Evans asked her to marry him, hoping, as he recounts in the autobiography, that his mother, who was dying of cancer, would see him as potentially becoming, aged nearly 31, a responsible family man. Hugueny, however, was barely three months past her 17th birthday and "[T]his beautiful, genteel innocent not only was a virgin when I married her, but had never been on a date". The May wedding took place "on the grounds of a romantic carriage house on La Colina in Beverly Hills. All my family were there, along with a host of friends—Cary Grant, Elizabeth Taylor and Eddie Fisher, Natalie and R.J., Felicia and Jack Lemmon, Anne and Kirk Douglas, and more".

Shortly after the wedding, Evans decided to give up his acting career and return to New York so that he could be near his mother and to help manage the women's fashion house Evan-Picone which he co-owned with his brother Charles and another partner, Joseph Picone. Referring to Hugueny as "my child bride", he recounts a panic attack she suffered on Manhattan's Lexington Avenue and her call to his office from a phone booth, "[C]hildlike, 'I don't know where I am'." He writes, "What had I been thinking, bringing this child to New York? It was like setting a Persian cat loose in the Amazon". Describing her as a "fragile flower", he explained that he "couldn't stand by and watch her be hurt anymore. It was unfair to her. Listening like a child, she understood". A "quickie divorce" in Mexico ended the marriage in November, but it would not be until June 1964 that the final property settlement was signed, and until July, when the divorce became final on the grounds that Evans "was never home".

== Return to Hollywood ==
Back in Hollywood shortly before her eighteenth birthday, Hugueny was photographed attending Bob Ender's twist party with TV's Dr. Kildare, Richard Chamberlain, but found that leaving for New York and putting her contract with Warner Bros. on hold, had damaged her career prospects. A prominent supporting role in the two-hour, 36-minute Technicolor film version of Leonard Spigelgass' hit Broadway comedy-drama, A Majority of One, which she had been completing at the time of her departure, was edited to little more than a cameo, with eighth billing in the cast list. After three more guest-starring roles in Warner shows, filmed in the first months of 1962, Hugueny's time with the studio was done. A news item noted that she was taking driving lessons, instead of having no other choice but to live within a walking distance of the studio entrance.

The first of her 1962 shows was a third appearance on 77 Sunset Strip, in the March 2 Efrem Zimbalist, Jr. episode, "Twice Dead", which cast her as the daughter of Margaret Hayes and did not provide her character with a love interest. Two months later, her third appearance on Hawaiian Eye, in the May 2 episode, "Rx Cricket", which focused on Connie Stevens' title character, left Hugueny competing for attention amidst a number of other guest stars. Finally, the pilot episode for Warners' World War II series, The Gallant Men, directed in March by Robert Altman and broadcast on October 5, after her departure from the studio, gave her a couple of brief atmospheric scenes as Italian girl Rosa, in Salerno, during Allied invasion of Italy. In the final scene, upon mention of her name in the aftermath of battle, the audience, but not the show's regular characters, is implicitly made aware of her ultimately tragic fate by the camera panning to a nearby pile of rubble, where a cross hanging from a ribbon, which had been prominently seen earlier around her neck, was barely perceptible amidst the destruction of war.

== Freelancing after Warner Bros. ==
Now at liberty, she received two additional job offers that year, a guest shot on the "Operation Arrivederci" episode of NBC's naval sitcom, Ensign O'Toole, which aired on March 5, 1963 and spotlighted her, again, as an Italian girl attracted to the title character (played by Dean Jones), and a heavily dramatic part as a mental patient in the independently-produced black-and-white feature, The Caretakers, released on August 21, 1963.

In an interview conducted over 40 years later, supporting actor Van Williams recalled the troubled production, produced, directed and co-written by Hall Bartlett and starring Jeffrey Hunter as a progressive doctor at a psychiatric clinic. After running out of funds the production was halted and the leading man replaced by Robert Stack who put up the financing from his earnings on The Untouchables. In addition to Williams, the cast included another familiar Warners contractee from Surfside 6 as well as from Parrish, Diane McBain, playing a psychiatric nurse. Billed eighth in the opening credits and eleventh in closing credits, Hugueny was Connie, whose personality is, again, childlike and who hears imaginary voices and has visions of becoming "free like a daisy". Most of the critical notices did little more than mention the character.

The next time she was seen on-screen occurred on May 20, 1964 in "The Mismatch Maker" episode of her second sitcom, The Farmer's Daughter. Playing another Latin, she was Maria Cortez, the daughter a South American ambassador, who develops a crush on the show's congressman, played by William Windom, with the sensible title character, Katie (Inger Stevens), diplomatically resolving the situation by introducing her to another congressman's handsome son (Yale Summers).

At the end of the year, with release of her fourth and final feature film, The Young Lovers, she received second billing, after Peter Fonda. Producer Samuel Goldwyn Jr., in his sole outing as a director, conducted a seven-month search to find the appropriate young lead opposite Fonda, with the proviso that in addition to having "training and dedication", she must be "an actress, not a starlet". The highly dramatic story of two unmarried college students, Eddie and Pam, faced with an unplanned and unwanted pregnancy provided numerous opportunities for heated confrontations and provocative (for 1964) contemplation of abortion. A number of critics commended Hugueny on her acting skills, but few had more than tepid words for the film.

Only twenty years old at the time of the film's release, Hugueny was approaching the end of her career. Her only work in 1965 was "This Town for Sale", the November 15 episode of the hour-long man-on-the-run-from-deadly-disease series, Run for Your Life and, in 1966, as college student Eliza in "The Ten Letterman", the February 11 installment of her third and final sitcom, Hank, in which the title character (played by Dick Kallman) surreptitiously audits college courses without paying for them. Also in February, gossip columns reported that she was dating 34-year-old Night of the Iguana actor James "Skip" Ward.

== Two marriages, motherhood and auto accident ==
In April 1968, at the age of 24, Sharon Hugueny was married in Santa Barbara to 21-year-old freelance photographer Raymond A. Ross and, in December, they become parents of a son. The marriage ended in 1974, but sources are unclear whether she was divorced or widowed.

Five months into her marriage, she was seen in a one-minute guest shot on the September 18, 1968 episode of ABC's popular primetime soap, Peyton Place, playing Donna Franklin, a glamorous and sophisticated mystery woman whose appearance in a restaurant with an older, divorced businessman (Joe Maross), upsets his teenage daughter (Elizabeth Walker) who is having dinner there with her mother (Barbara Rush) and the mother's social companion, Dr. Michael Rossi (Ed Nelson). Despite the brevity of her role and billing at the bottom of the episode's cast list, the character was mentioned in a few subsequent installments of the serial and seemed to have a potential of becoming a semi-regular, but did not appear again, other than for a fleeting, unbilled, sighting in the December 11 episode. Hugueny's impending motherhood that month may have contributed in putting an end to any future plans of developing the Donna Franklin storyline.

After a passage of six years, in the last days of 1974, the year of her divorce/widowhood, she made one final appearance in front of the cameras, as a guest star in "Choice of Victims", the December 22 episode of the hour-long detective series, Mannix.

Over a year later, on April 16, 1976, in Kentucky's Jefferson County, Hugueny, age 32, married 45-year-old writer and founder of Mid America Pictures, Gordon Cornell Layne. The following year, deciding to return to acting, she acquired new management and was en route to sign performing contracts when she was badly injured by a police vehicle engaged in a high-speed pursuit. Attended by her husband at their home in California's San Bernardino Mountains resort community of Lake Arrowhead, she partially recovered and lived for 19 more years, until succumbing to cancer in July 1996 at age 52.
