= Charles Evans Jr. =

American film producer

- Occupations: Motion picture producer, nonprofit foundation executive
- Parent: Charles Evans

Charles Evans Jr. is an American film producer and documentary film director. He produced Johnny Depp's first directorial effort, The Brave. He was one of four producers on the 2004 biopic The Aviator, although his production credit was controversial. Evans is the nephew of former motion picture studio executive Robert Evans, and the son of fashion industry executive and motion picture producer Charles Evans.

== Life and career ==
In 1975, Charles and his family were caught in a fire in their New York City apartment. His mother and two sisters died in the fire. The fire was caused by ashes falling out of their fireplace. Charles Jr., sleeping in another room, was rescued by firefighters and uninjured.

In the aftermath of the deadly fire, 12-year-old Charles Jr. "put on an overcoat and went to live with my father," in his words. He also began taking illegal narcotics and developed a serious addiction. Charles Jr. attended the Williston Northampton School, University of California, Berkeley and then the USC School of Cinematic Arts. His father was ambivalent about the decision. "I certainly didn't give him any encouragement. I think it's a stinking business. But he's wanted to do it since he was in grade school. He wanted to either write, direct or produce."

His first professional credit came on the 1988 horror film on Monkey Shines, which was financially backed by his father. He served as an assistant director on the picture. His first producer's credit came with the 1997 film The Brave, which was also Johnny Depp's directorial debut. Evans formed his own production company, Acappella Pictures, in 1993. In 1998, Evans said he had purchased a script by Frederic Raphael which adapted the 1905 Edith Wharton novel, The House of Mirth, for the big screen.

Evans was also the producer and director of the 2012 documentary film Addiction Incorporated. The documentary reports on the ways in which research scientists, corporate whistleblowers, the news media, and attorneys for smokers exposed the tobacco industry's attempts to conceal the ways in which cigarettes were made more addictive.

Evans also served a producer of the 2004 Howard Hughes biopic, The Aviator. According to Evans, he began researching the life of Hughes in 1993. In 1996, Evans optioned the book Howard Hughes: The Untold Story, by Pat H. Broeske and Peter Harry Brown. Evans hired several writers, who produced five or six drafts of a script, but the screenplay was still not in an acceptable form. These included several drafts of a script by Broeske and Brown, and at least one version by Dean Ollins. Evans then met with actor Kevin Spacey, who was interested in directing the film. Spacey helped Evans find financing, and New Regency Productions agreed to put up the money. Screenwriter Jack Fincher was brought aboard to do another script draft.

Evans convinced Leonardo DiCaprio to play the lead in 1998. But DiCaprio insisted that he be allowed to pick the director. Evans removed Spacey as the director, DiCaprio joined the production, and in December 1998 DiCaprio chose Michael Mann as the director. Mann subsequently hired Tony- and Oscar-nominated screenwriter John Logan in the spring of 1999 to write yet another screenplay. Logan's contract with the producers guaranteed him sole screenplay credit. The producers and director were also barred from hiring writers to revise Logan's script, or from claiming any role in the script (even if they made a contribution). Evans began sharing with Mann and Logan his large archive of Hughes memorabilia and biographical materials (which Evans says he had been building since 1995).

In March 2000, Evans says, he learned that Mann had taken the project to New Line Cinema. Evans sued for breach of implied contract, fraud, and intentional interference with economic advantage.
