= Breakout (1997 film) =

1997 television film

- Genre: Thriller
- Written by: Michael Stewart
- Directed by: Moira Armstrong
- Starring: Neil Dudgeon; Samantha Bond; Dermot Crowley; Jasper Britton; Janet Dale; Nigel Clauzel; Marius Stanescu
- Composer: David Ferguson
- Country of origin: United Kingdom
- No. of episodes: 1

Production
- Executive producers: Michael Stewart; Jo Wright
- Producer: Peter Norris
- Cinematography: John Kenway
- Editor: Robin Graham
- Running time: 90 minutes
- Production company: Quantum Films

Original release
- Network: BBC1
- Release: 22 April 1997

Breakout is a British television drama film written by Michael Stewart, first broadcast on BBC1 on 22 April 1997. Directed by Moira Armstrong, the film starred Neil Dudgeon and Samantha Bond as scientists Neil McFarlane and Lisa Temple, who join to investigate a mysterious death. The film was writer Michael Stewart's second science-based TV project, following ITV's Bliss, which premiered in 1995. According to BFI records, the original working title for the film was "The Lab".

The film co-starred Dermot Crowley, Jasper Britton and Janet Dale; with Carolyn Pickles, Hugh Bonneville, Joe Swash and Benedict Wong also amongst the additional cast members. BBC Genome Project records list the original description for the film as; "When a rare illness strikes down three people near a scientific research site, doctors battle against time to discover if a genetically-engineered pesticide, designed only to affect insects, has jumped the species gap during field tests." The film has never been released on VHS or DVD.

== Cast ==
- Neil Dudgeon as Dr. Neil McFarlane
- Samantha Bond as Dr. Lisa Temple
- Dermot Crowley as Dr. Bill Galton
- Jasper Britton as Lenny Johnson
- Janet Dale as Gwenda Irwing
- Nigel Clauzel as Alex James
- Marius Stanescu as Stefan Popescu
- Peter Jeffrey as Professor Bannerman
- William Chubb as Det. Insp. Matthews
- Toby Salaman as Dr. John Underwood
- Carolyn Pickles as Diane Cresswell
- Garry Cooper as Andy Cresswell
- Joe Swash as Jason Cresswell
- Lisa Kelly as Heather Collins
- Hilary Lyon as Phillippa McFarlane
- Hugh Bonneville as Peter Schneider
- Benedict Wong as Jerry Kane
- Vanessa Earl as Suzanne Drake
- Kathleen Bidmead as Olga Livingstone
