= The Brave (film) =

1997 film

- Promotional release poster
- Directed by: Johnny Depp
- Screenplay by: D. P. Depp; Johnny Depp; Paul McCudden
- Based on: The Brave (novel) by Gregory Mcdonald
- Produced by: Charles Evans, Jr.; Carroll Kemp
- Starring: Johnny Depp; Marlon Brando; Marshall Bell; Frederic Forrest; Elpidia Carrillo
- Cinematography: Vilko Filač; Eugene D. Shlugleit
- Edited by: Pasquale Buba; Hervé Schneid
- Music by: Iggy Pop
- Distributed by: Majestic Films International
- Release dates: May 10, 1997 (Cannes Film Festival); July 30, 1997 (France)
- Running time: 123 minutes
- Country: United States
- Language: English
- Budget: $5-6 million

The Brave is a 1997 American independent neo-western film directed by and starring Johnny Depp from a screenplay he co-wrote with D. P. Depp and Paul McCudden, based on the Gregory McDonald novel of the same title. The film also stars Marlon Brando, Marshall Bell, Frederic Forrest and Elpidia Carrillo.

This film was Depp's directorial and screenwriting debut. It premiered at the 1997 Cannes Film Festival where it received negative reviews from American critics and was nominated for the Palme d'Or and the Caméra d'Or. The film was released in theaters and on DVD internationally, but not in the United States; Depp stated that he did not want to release it to a general public that had criticized it.

== Plot ==
A Native American man named Raphael lives with his wife and two children in a remote community, near a garbage dump. He sells whatever he can to make a living. Raphael, seeing the hopelessness of his situation and his inability to provide for his family, agrees to star in a snuff film for a large sum of money that he hopes will give his family a chance for a better life.

Having been given part of the money in advance, Raphael is given a week to live and then return to be tortured and killed in front of the camera. Over the course of his final week of his life Raphael changes his relationship with his wife and children and faces his own personal anguish over his fate.

== Cast and characters ==
- Johnny Depp as Raphael
- Marlon Brando as McCarthy, the snuff film's director/producer
- Marshall Bell as Larry
- Elpidia Carrillo as Rita
- Frederic Forrest as Lou Sr.
- Clarence Williams III as Father Stratton
- Max Perlich as Lou Jr.
- Luis Guzmán as Luis
- Cody Lightning as Frankie
- Nicole Mancera as Marta
- Floyd Red Crow Westerman as Papa
- Pepe Serna as Alessandro
- Lupe Ontiveros as Maria
- Alexis Cruz as Heyman
- Chuck E. Weiss as Whizzy

== Production ==
The initial script, written by Paul McCudden and based on a book by Gregory Mcdonald, attracted interest from Hollywood studios in 1993, despite the dark nature of the story. Disney's Touchstone Pictures eventually picked up the film, and work on it was set to begin in early 1994. In December 1993, however, Aziz Ghazal, the first time director from USC film school who was attached to the picture, killed his wife and daughter before committing suicide. His body would not be found by Los Angeles police for over a month. With the director of the film missing and presumed responsible for the murder of his family, Touchstone immediately suspended production.

In spite of this major setback, McCudden and his production partner Charles Evans persisted in trying to get the film made, as they had already invested a substantial amount of their own money into it. In 1994, they were able to convince Johnny Depp to rewrite, direct and produce the film, with it taking him three years to complete. Depp disliked the original script, but still took on the project as he was moved by "the idea of sacrifice for family."

Iggy Pop wrote and performed all the music to the film, and appears briefly during a party scene. Some of the songs on the film were later released on his 1999 studio album Avenue B. Johnny Depp cast himself in the lead role as a means to attract interest from potential financers. The film had an estimated production budget of $5 million and Depp agreed to pay if the cost went over, and may have put as much as $2 million of his own money into the film.

== Reception ==
The initial 1997 reviews from American critics were highly negative. On Rotten Tomatoes the film has an approval rating of 33% based on reviews from 6 critics. Metacritic, which uses a weighted average, assigned the film a score of 24 out of 100, based on 9 critics, indicating "generally unfavorable" reviews. Variety dismissed the film as "a turgid and unbelievable neo-western." Time Out criticized the film, stating that "[b]esides the implausibilities, the direction has two fatal flaws: it's both tediously slow and hugely narcissistic as the camera focuses repeatedly on Depp's bandana'd head and rippling torso."

According to Depp, the negative reviews led to his decision to not give The Brave a formal release in the United States, either in theaters or on home media.

The Brave was nominated for the prestigious Palme d'Or at the 1997 Cannes Film Festival in the year of its release, losing to Taste of Cherry and The Eel. It was also nominated for Caméra d'Or (best first film), but lost to Suzaku.
