= The Caretakers (1963 film) =

1963 American drama film

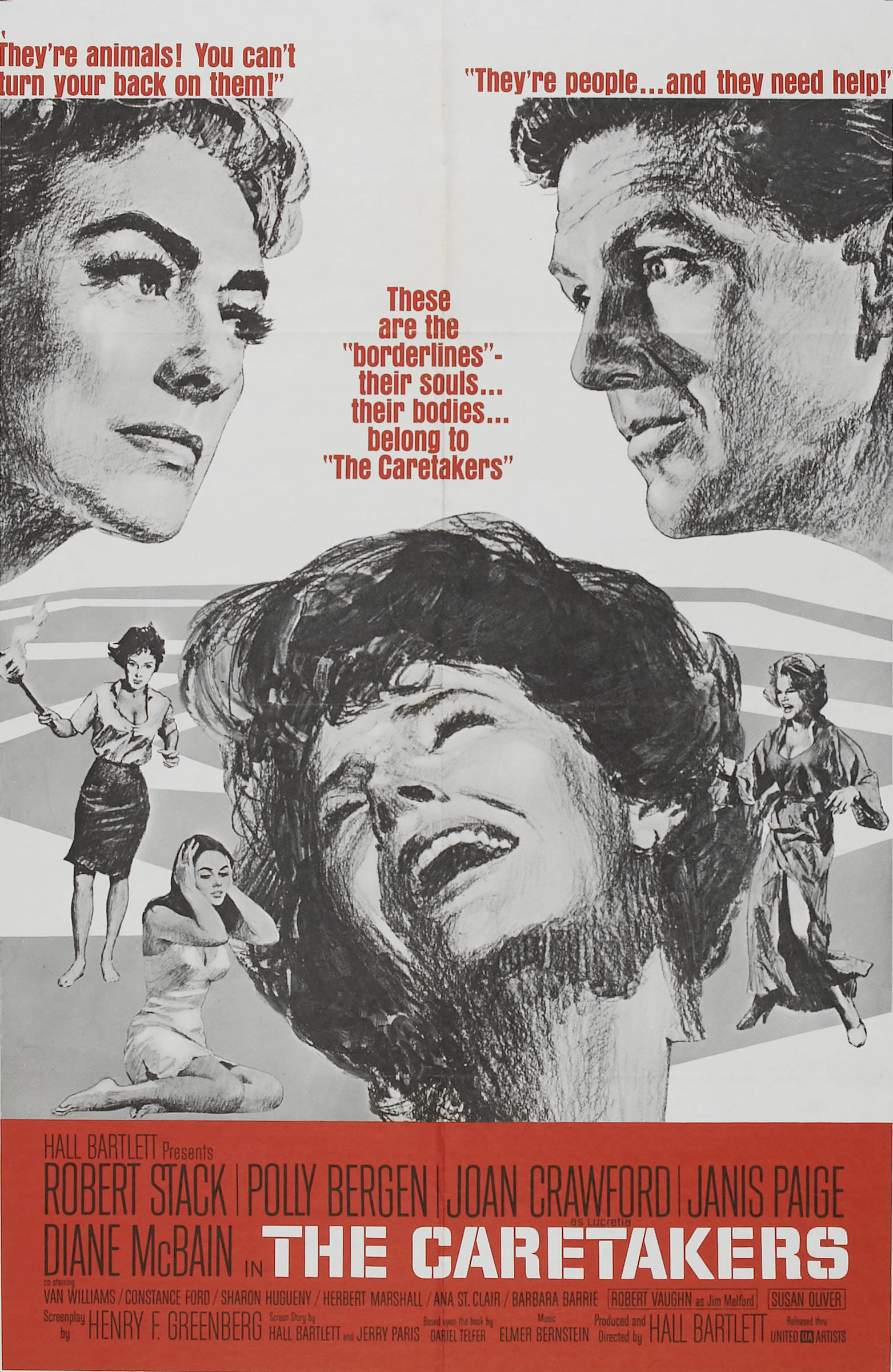
- Original theatrical poster
- Directed by: Hall Bartlett
- Screenplay by: Henry F. Greenberg
- Story by: Hall Bartlett; Jerry Paris
- Based on: the book by Dariel Telfer
- Produced by: Hall Bartlett
- Starring: Robert Stack; Polly Bergen; Joan Crawford; Janis Paige; Diane McBain; Van Williams; Constance Ford; Sharon Hugueny; Herbert Marshall; Ana St. Clair; Barbara Barrie; Robert Vaughn; Susan Oliver
- Cinematography: Lucien Ballard, A.S.C.
- Edited by: William B. Murphy, A.C.E.
- Music by: Elmer Bernstein
- Production company: Hall Bartlett Productions, Inc.
- Distributed by: United Artists
- Release date: August 21, 1963
- Running time: 97 minutes
- Country: United States
- Language: English
- Box office: $2,050,000 (US/Canada) $1,110,000 (Foreign)

The Caretakers (released in the UK as Borderlines) is a 1963 American drama film starring Robert Stack, Polly Bergen, Diane McBain, Joan Crawford and Janis Paige in a story about a mental hospital.

The screenplay was adapted by Henry F. Greenberg from a story by Hall Bartlett and Jerry Paris based on the 1959 novel The Caretakers by Dariel Telfer. The film was produced and directed by Bartlett, co-produced by Paris and distributed by United Artists. The Caretakers is reminiscent of The Snake Pit (1948), a film set in a similar hospital. The on-screen text in opening credits states: "Dedicated to the caretakers whose research and sacrifice discover truth. For Beba, Alice, Paul, Cathy, Laurie, Pearl, Margaret, Warren, Arthur".

== Plot ==
Optimistic psychiatrist Dr. Donovan MacLeod wants to prove his theory that mental patients can benefit from group therapy. His method of treatment, with no violence or punishment, is met with a great deal of resistance from his unyielding and self-righteous head nurse, Lucretia Terry, who believes in traditional methods such as strait-jackets and padded cells for treating the mentally ill.

Head of the hospital Dr. Harrington is weak-willed. Terry's assistant, nurse Bracken, supports her superior's stand. After much trial and error and the harrowing near-rape of a patient, MacLeod's ideas prevail in spite of the opposition and meet some success.

Patients include distraught mother Lorna Medford, former prostitute Marion, pyromaniac Edna, and former schoolteacher Irene.

== Cast ==
- Robert Stack as Dr. Donovan MacLeod
- Polly Bergen as Lorna Melford
- Diane McBain as Alison
- Joan Crawford as Lucretia Terry
- Virginia Munshin as Ruth
- Ellen Corby as Irene
- Barbara Barrie as Edna
- Herbert Marshall as Dr. Harrington
- Sharon Hugueny as Connie
- Robert Vaughn as Jim Melford
- Susan Oliver as Cathy
- Ana St. Clair as Ana
- Constance Ford as Nurse Bracken
- Van Williams as Dr. Larry Denning
- Janis Paige as Marion

== Production ==
Co-writer/co-producer Jerry Paris appears in The Caretakers as a passerby Lorna bumps into on the street.

Joan Crawford arranged for each day's scenes with veteran actor Herbert Marshall, an old friend who was in frail health, to be shot first, thus allowing him to finish his work early in the day.

Crawford was on the board of directors of PepsiCo, and product placements for Pepsi-Cola include a scene at the hospital picnic, which features a wagon that is dispensing the soft drink.

== Reception ==
Variety wrote "Miss Crawford doesn't so much play her handful of scenes as she dresses for them, looking as if she were en route to a Pepsi board meeting", and called the film a "superficial, ineptly-plotted drama" Bosley Crowther of The New York Times noted "Altogether, this woman's melodrama is shallow, showy, and cheap - a badly commercial exploitation of very sensitive material." Some individual performances were better received by reviewers. Variety said "Diane McBain and Susan Oliver, as nurses, and Sharon Hugueny, as a young patient, do nicely." James Powers wrote in the Hollywood Reporter, "Diane McBain and Susan Oliver are good as young nurses".

Despite some negative reviews, the film grossed over $3 million worldwide, ranking #57 on Variety's list of top-grossing films for 1963.

== Awards and nominations ==
The Caretakers received an Academy Award nomination for Best Cinematography, Black-and-White for Lucien Ballard. It received Golden Globe Award nominations for Best Motion Picture - Drama, Best Motion Picture Actress - Drama for Polly Bergen, and Best Motion Picture Director for Hall Bartlett.

== Home media ==
The Caretakers was released on Region 1 DVD on April 15, 2010, through Amazon.com as part of the MGM Limited Edition Collection.

== See also ==
- List of American films of 1963
