= Kid Notorious =

- Genre: Sitcom; Black comedy; Surreal humor
- Created by: Brett Morgen; Robert Evans; Alan R. Cohen; Alan Freedland
- Voices of: Robert Evans; Alan Selka; Niecy Nash; Slash; Jeannie Elias
- Country of origin: United States
- Original language: English
- No. of seasons: 1
- No. of episodes: 9

Production
- Running time: 22 minutes
- Production companies: Alan & Alan Productions; Brett Morgen Productions; Woodland Productions; Six Point Harness

Original release
- Network: Comedy Central
- Release: October 22 – December 17, 2003

Kid Notorious is an American adult animated sitcom that aired from October 22 to December 17, 2003 on Comedy Central. It starred Hollywood film producer Robert Evans as himself. The episode plots were often bizarre and absurdist in nature, featuring Evans as a James Bond type character. Guns N' Roses guitarist Slash also appeared on the show as himself. The show was directed by Pete Michels.

In the United Kingdom, it aired on Bravo.

== Characters ==
- Robert Evans (as himself): a playboy Hollywood producer who finds himself mixed up in bizarre and absurd situations but never loses his cool.
- Tollie Mae (Niecy Nash): Evans' loud maid. Spends most of her time binge eating chocolate and lusting after Denzel Washington. Her catchphrase is "Not in my job description." Tollie Mae was named for Tollie Mae Wilson, who was Evans' housekeeper at the time of his marriage to Ali MacGraw.
- Alan Selka (as himself): Evans' long-suffering butler, English. A running gag involves Puss Puss farting in his face. Voiced by Evans' real-life butler, Alan Selka, who is reportedly very much like his character in real life.
- Puss Puss: Evans' beloved cat who follows him wherever he goes; she plays chess and smokes marijuana. Puss has a hate-hate relationship with English which has included pistol-whipping, neck crushing, farting in his face and placing a piranha in the sauna.
- Slash (as himself): The former lead guitarist for Guns N' Roses. As in real life, Slash was Evans' close friend and next-door neighbor.
- Donald Rumsfeld (Billy West): The United States Secretary of Defense at the time. He is depicted as a sidekick and poker buddy of Evans and Slash.

== Episodes ==
No.	Title	Original release date
1	"Hip Hop to the Godfather"	October 22, 2003
In order to best Sharon Stone's version of The Vagina Monologues, Evans produces a Broadway musical, rap-oriented version of The Godfather, but finds his life threatened when he casts Crips and Bloods as the Corleones
2	"The F-You Soup"	October 29, 2003
Evans and company travel to Asia to obtain yak milk needed for Slash's special soup
3	"The French Take Woodland"	November 5, 2003
Evans loses his home to Jacques Chirac in a poker game, and must win it back with the help of La Toya Jackson. To get the buy-in money for the game, Evans needs Francis Ford Coppola's new unproduced script.
4	"Kill Kim Jong Il"	November 12, 2003
Donald Rumsfeld tasks Evans with assassinating Kim Jong-il, but he finds himself conflicted when it turns out that Kim (a huge Popeye fan) is one of the world's greatest romantic comedy directors
5	"The Nazi Party"	November 19, 2003
One of Evans' friends is murdered by a fugitive Nazi, so Evans goes undercover as a Neo-Nazi to take revenge
6	"Princess Serena"	November 26, 2003
While at a party trying to get Leonardo DiCaprio to star in his newest movie, Evans falls for Princess Serena, the runaway wife of a Middle Eastern sheik, and must fend off her estranged husband's attempts to kill him while simultaneously raising the funds to finance the film.
7	"Wedding Belles"	December 3, 2003
Evans has to get pictures of Martha Stewart's buttocks in order to obtain his ex-assistant's sex tape from Hugh Hefner. Meanwhile, English schools Johnny Knoxville on how to be a butler.
8	"Pilot"	December 10, 2003
CIA officers enlist Evans and Puss Puss in a plot to assassinate Kim Jong-il. When Evans learns that the plot will entail the cat's death, he must rescue Puss Puss. Partially reworked later as Kill Kim Jong Il.
9	"White Christmas"	December 17, 2003
Series finale. Inspired by a vision on the Mexican desert, Evans stages a Christmas telethon to save Tollie Mae's church. Guest starring Rob Schneider as himself.
