= Eye of the Storm (1991 film) =

1991 German film

- Directed by: Yuri Zeltser
- Written by: Michael Stewart
- Produced by: Oliver Eberle
- Starring: Craig Sheffer; Lara Flynn Boyle; Bradley Gregg; Leon Rippy; Dennis Hopper
- Cinematography: Karl Walter Lindenlaub
- Edited by: Michael J. Duthie
- Music by: Christopher Franke
- Production companies: Club Ed Film Set; Mojave Desert
- Distributed by: Columbia TriStar; Image Entertainment
- Release dates: October 3, 1991 (Germany); 1992 (USA)
- Running time: 98 minutes
- Countries: Germany; USA

Eye of the Storm is a 1991 German-American romantic thriller, directed by Yuri Zeltser.

== Plot ==
At a highway gas station/motel where they live, two young brothers witness their parents murder. The younger brother is blinded in the same incident. Ten years later both brothers are still there and the tragedy may have turned one of them psychotic: customers never check out. When the abusive Gladstone and his young and sexy wife are stranded at the gas station it brings out the worst in everyone.

== Cast ==
- Craig Sheffer as Ray
- Lara Flynn Boyle as Sandra Gladstone
- Bradley Gregg as Steven
  - Adrian Arnold as Young Steven
- Dennis Hopper as Marvin Gladstone
- Leon Rippy as Sheriff
- Wilhelm von Homburg as Killer
- Barbara Lindsay as Mother
- John Storey as Deputy
- Ally Walker as Killer Girl

== Reception ==
Radio Times rated it 2 out of 5 stars.
