= Monkey Shines =

1983 novel by Michael Stewart

- First edition cover art
- Author: Michael Stewart
- Language: English
- Genre: Horror, science fiction
- Published: 1 September 1983
- Publisher: Freundlich Books
- Publication place: United Kingdom
- Media type: Print
- Pages: 256 (first edition)
- ISBN: 978-0-881-91001-8
- OCLC: 9555443

Monkey Shines is a 1983 British psychological horror novel by Michael Stewart. Its plot follows a quadriplegic man whose service animal, a capuchin monkey named Ella, grows increasingly violent. It was adapted into a feature film of the same name in 1988 by director George A. Romero.

== Premise ==
The novel follows Allan Mann, an Oxford law student who becomes quadriplegic after an accident, and is given a service monkey named Ella to help him with daily tasks. Ella, however, has been scientifically altered, and begins to channel Allan's inner fury, carrying out his most devious desires.

== Critical response ==
Kirkus Reviews deemed the novel "Uneven in tone, with neither the sparkle of Michael Crichton nor the involving seriousness of, say, Richard Setlowe's The Experiment--but a lively, often intriguing smorgasbord of medical-ordeal, neuro-science, paranormal chills, and man/animal love-story."
