= The Young Lovers (1964 film) =

1964 film by Samuel Goldwyn, Jr.

- Theatrical release poster
- Directed by: Samuel Goldwyn Jr.
- Screenplay by: George Garrett
- Based on: The Young Lovers (1955 novel) by Julian Halevy
- Produced by: Samuel Goldwyn Jr.
- Starring: Peter Fonda; Sharon Hugueny; Nick Adams; Deborah Walley
- Cinematography: Joseph Biroc; Ellsworth Fredericks
- Edited by: William A. Lyon
- Music by: Sol Kaplan
- Production companies: Tigertail Productions; Metro-Goldwyn-Mayer
- Distributed by: Metro-Goldwyn-Mayer
- Release dates: June 23, 1964 (United States); October 14, 1964 (Cleveland)
- Running time: 110 minutes
- Country: United States
- Language: English

The Young Lovers is a 1964 black-and-white American romantic drama film. It was released by Metro-Goldwyn-Mayer in November 1964. The sole directorial effort of its producer, Samuel Goldwyn Jr., it stars Peter Fonda and Sharon Hugueny, with second leads Nick Adams and Deborah Walley. Scripted by George Garrett from a 1955 novel by Julian Halevy, the film was shot in September–October 1963 and released a year later.

== Plot ==
While attending college, Eddie (Peter Fonda) shares an apartment with another student, nicknamed Tarragoo (Nick Adams). Tarragoo's girlfriend Debbie (Deborah Walley) and her friend Pam (Sharon Hugueny), who is studying to be a teacher and lives with her widowed mother (Beatrice Straight), are frequent visitors. Eddie and Pam develop a close relationship; and, during the time her mother is away from home for a few days, Pam allows Eddie to stay the night. Finding herself pregnant, she tells Eddie who reacts with unhappiness, being low on funds and dismayed by the prospect of losing his scholarship. Pam discusses the situation with her mother, considers having an abortion, decides against it and makes plans to leave.

Meanwhile, Eddie, with help from professors Schwartz (Malachi Throne) and Reese (Joseph Campanella), improves his educational standing by passing an exam and consults with Tarragoo and Debbie who advise him to take the morally correct path. At the crossroads of integrity, Eddie chooses rectitude and goes to Pam's mother, intent upon telling her so. Learning that Pam has already departed, he aims to follow her, with the conviction that whatever life offers, they will be able to face it together.

== Cast ==
- Peter Fonda as Eddie Slocum
- Sharon Hugueny as Pam Burns
- Nick Adams as Tarragoo
- Deborah Walley as Debbie
- Beatrice Straight as Pam's mother
- Malachi Throne as Professor Schwartz
- Joseph Campanella as Professor Reese
- Kent Smith as Dr. Shoemaker
- Jennifer Billingsley as Karen
- Nancy Rennick as Mary Reese

== Production ==
The film was based on a novel by blacklisted screenwriter Julian Zimet, writing as Julian Halavey, which was published in 1956. It was optioned as a Broadway play but no stage production resulted. Goldwyn purchased the screen rights in March 1957, intending to make it after The Proud Rebel. Robert Dozier wrote the first script and Goldwyn launched a talent quest to find 100 young lovers, who could appear in the film.

The film took a number of years to be made, in part because Goldwyn was unhappy with the scripts he had written. "None of them caught the spirit, attitudes or the idiom of young people," he said.

The script was eventually written by George Garrett, an assistant professor of English whose prose Goldwyn admired. It was his first screenplay.

Goldwyn decided to direct himself because he "wanted total control".

Goldwyn wanted Richard Beymer for a lead part. Peter Fonda was cast on the basis of his stage performance in Blood, Sweat and Stanley Poole.

Goldwyn struggled to raise finance because of the lack of a major star. Eventually he and partner Doug Netter raised the money from eight investors, most of whom where in exhibition, over four months.

Filming started in September 1963.

Distribution rights were sold to MGM in May 1964.

Goldwyn went on a lecture tour with the film.

== Tagline ==
"There is a moment when the rest of the world ceases to exist."

== Reception ==
According to Filmink "few people saw it".

The New York Times Guide to Movies on TV (1970 edition, edited by Howard Thompson), starting with the write-up tagline "Uh-huh", provides a one-sentence overview of the plot and describes the film as "A tasteful, occasionally interesting and tentative little drama, that seems decorously light years away from today's campus realism but even on its own terms disappointingly beats a retreat from reality". The review also praises Malachi Throne, Joseph Campanella and Beatrice Straight, and ends with "Best of all are Nick Adams as Fonda's roommate and Deborah Walley as his peppery, virtuous little quarry." A small photograph from the film depicts the four young leads sharing a drink.

Steven H. Scheuer's Movies on TV (1986–87 edition) gives The Young Lovers 1 star (out of 4), describing it as "pangs of first love, Hollywood-style" and concluding, As usual, the principals act more dopey than romantic". By the 1993–1994 edition, the conclusion had been deleted, leaving only the description. Leonard Maltin's Movie Guide (2009 edition) manages a higher rating, 2 stars (out of 4), but not a higher opinion, dismissing it as an "Amateurish, meandering drama of college youth involved in romance".

The Motion Picture Guide (1987 edition) goes half a step higher than Maltin, assigning 2½ stars (out of 5) and deciding that "This 'youth in trouble' film is hardly fresh in story content and is lacking in production values". The review also notes that "The direction is choppy, with a somewhat confusing time frame, but the cast proves able to overcome the problems and inherent soap-opera qualities of the script".
