= Richard Setlowe =

American author and journalist (1933–2022)

- Born: 1933; Brooklyn, New York, U.S.
- Died: 25 August 2022 (aged 89); Panorama City, California, U.S.
- Occupations: Novelist, journalist
- Writing career
- Period: 1976–2022
- Genre: Literary thrillers
- Notable works: The Experiment, The Black Sea, The Brink, The Sexual Occupation of Japan
- Website: www.richardsetlowe.com

Richard Setlowe (1933 – 25 August 2022) was an American author and journalist best known for his suspense novels, which have enjoyed critical and academic recognition. His early career as a Navy officer in the Far East and a fascination with technology inform his thrillers. The Brink, published in 1976, was acclaimed as "the classic novel of the Era of Undeclared War" and was a finalist for the Ernest Hemingway Award for First Novels. The Experiment (1980) and The Haunting of Suzanna Blackwell (1984) venture into the realm of science fiction and the supernatural, while exploring deep personal themes. With The Black Sea (1991), a prescient narrative about a lone Navy frigate's encounter with terrorists, the novelist Clive Cussler commented, "Setlowe has to be the finest adventure novelist in the country today". The Sexual Occupation of Japan (1999) was lauded by English professor and novelist Les Standiford as "rivaling Michael Crichton in topicality, le Carre in authority, and Martin Cruz Smith in emotional depth". Setlowe's five novels to date have been translated into a dozen languages.

== Background ==
Setlowe was born in 1933 in Brooklyn, New York during the height of the Depression. His father Ernest quit law school to become an actor, and a playwright, and met his future wife Marion, a dancer, while performing in the 1927 production of the Broadway musical Good News. With a growing family, Setlowe's father abandoned his theatre ambitions and went to work in a family furniture manufacturing business.

They moved to Morristown, Tennessee, in the foothills of the Smoky Mountains. The family lived there for just a few years, but the young New Yorker's experiences were deeply affecting. While his novels explore the Pacific Rim from California to Asia, major characters are often Southerners.

Ernest Setlowe encouraged his son Rick's creative interests. In high school on Long Island, teachers were less encouraging. Setlowe's lowest grades were English and languages, but his math and science won him a scholarship to Rensselaer Polytechnic Institute in upstate New York to study engineering. He transferred in his junior year on a Navy scholarship to the University of Southern California. As part of his training, each summer he embarked as a midshipman aboard warships that made ports of call in Europe. Wanting a broader education, Rick switched majors and earned a B.S. degree in social studies along with a regular commission as a Navy officer.

Ensign Setlowe volunteered for Navy flight school with the ambition of becoming a fighter pilot. But after a year of flight training in Florida, in a budget cutback the Navy reassigned him to the USS Midway as an operations officer and flight controller in the Far East. The aircraft carrier was the flagship during the international crisis in the Taiwan Straits in 1958. Setlowe disembarked from the Midway in San Francisco with the material for his first novels in his sea bag.

== Early career ==
Prior to becoming a full-time novelist, Rick Setlowe worked as a journalist, first as a staff writer for the San Francisco Examiner, then a correspondent for Time magazine. In San Francisco, he also wrote the "Babylon by the Bay" column for Variety and reviewed drama, movies and music. Subsequently, he transferred to Los Angeles, as the "Show Biz Bible's" primary film critic.

He also served as Press and TV Director for the first National Air Races staged in Reno, Nevada, in 1964, drawing on his Navy flight experience. Setlowe subsequently worked in television news in San Francisco and Los Angeles.

During this time he wrote his first novel, The Brink, but the Vietnam War made publishing any fiction about the military extremely controversial. At one point, he received a long letter from a major editor at Doubleday apologizing for not publishing the novel.

Setlowe successfully ventured from journalism into motion pictures, in the early 1970s at ABC Pictures as Vice President of Creative Affairs. The feature films produced during his tenure included several critically significant pictures: the comedy Kotch (1971), starring Best Actor Oscar winner Walter Matthau, with Jack Lemmon in his directorial debut (Academy Award nominations also for Film Editing, Best Song, and Sound); Sam Peckinpah's controversial thriller Straw Dogs (1971), starring Dustin Hoffman; and the Bob Fosse (Best Director) musical Cabaret (1972), starring Liza Minnelli and Joel Grey in Oscar-winning performances (the film won 8 of 10 Oscars for which it was nominated). Kotch and Cabaret also garnered back-to-back Writer's Guild Awards for Best Adapted Screenplay in 1972 and 1973, respectively.

Richard Setlowe is honored in Who's Who In Entertainment.

As his career and writing developed, he did post-graduate work at Stanford and Charles University in Prague, eventually returning to USC to earn a Masters of Professional Writing with Phi Kappa Phi honors. For 15 years, Setlowe taught in the UCLA Extension Writers' Program.

He and his wife Beverly lived in Los Angeles, the setting of his forthcoming sixth novel. On occasion he wrote articles for the Los Angeles Times and Variety.

== Major works and commentary ==
=== Novels ===
- The Brink (Arthur Fields Books, New York, 1976 ISBN 0-525-63014-7)
- The Experiment (Holt, Rinehart and Winston, New York, 1980 ISBN 0-03-041745-7)
- The Haunting of Suzanna Blackwell (Holt Rinehart and Winston, New York, 1984 ISBN 0-03-057786-1)
- The Black Sea (Ticknor and Fields, New York, 1991 ISBN 0-395-56927-3)
- The Sexual Occupation of Japan (HarperCollins Publishers, New York, 1999 ISBN 0-06-018393-4)

=== The Brink ===
Setlowe's first novel, The Brink, was critically acclaimed as "the classic novel of the Era of Undeclared War" and was a finalist for the Ernest Hemingway Award for First Novels. It draws upon his own experience aboard the U.S.S. Midway during the Quemoy-Matsu crisis. John Chancellor, the late NBC News anchorman, noted, "The Brink is a vivid and frightening description of something very few people have ever experienced: actually taking the nuclear bombs to the brink of war".

This Doomsday scenario is drawn out in vivid counterpoint to the human dimensions, which portrays the social ferment of marital tedium, love and sexual profligacy in military life. The Brink is a post Cold War thriller that has been favorably compared with one of the best books of the genre, James Michener's Bridges of Toko-Ri. Setlowe retrospectively incorporates his personal experiences into his narrative, but The Brink also reflects some of the pervasive social discontent of the post-Vietnam War period during which the book was written. The premise for The Brink is contextualized in well-documented historical events—the strident posturing of world leaders such as Nikita Khrushchev, sensational headlines taken directly from the ominous intonations of President Eisenhower and General Dulles, and the clinical calculus of now-declassified reports on the crisis. One study prepared by a joint committee of the Defense Dept., State Dept. and CIA at the direction of President Eisenhower developed possible limited war contingencies in defense of the Offshore [Taiwanese] Islands, but quickly arrived at a consensus assessment: "…the Joint Chiefs, in particular Air Force General Nathan Twining, Chairman of the Joint Chiefs, felt that the use of atomic weapons was inevitable and the planning proceeded on that assumption" and "the study proceeded on the assumption that a Chinese Communist move against the Offshore Islands would involve aerial as well as artillery interdiction followed by American atomic attacks on mainland airfields".

=== The Experiment ===
Setlowe's second novel, The Experiment, published in 1980, is a medical science fiction thriller. The story of "a human Neptune in the grotto of marine science. And, more particularly, our imagination", was a Literary Guild selection. The New York Times review by Jack Sullivan praised "an underwater phantasmagoria, [that] delivers a welcome sense of wonder in the tradition of H. G. Wells's In The Abyss. The renowned science fiction author and futurist Sir Arthur C. Clarke, author of 2001: A Space Odyssey, corresponded with Setlowe. The Experiment resonated with Clarke, who had a lifelong interest in the sea and diving. He respected the meticulous scientific research—Clarke had personally known several of the scientists cited—and commented on the novel's place in the sci-fi pantheon.

=== The Haunting of Suzanna Blackwell ===
The Haunting of Suzanna Blackwell is a departure from the previous two novels. Published in 1984, the story weaves together multiple storylines and elements of love, war and occult genres into a ghost story suffused with smoldering passion, foreboding and suspense.

This second Literary Guild selection is, at one level, a classic gothic. Yet, again drawing on his personal background, the author sets the story on a modern high-tech Navy base. "Those ships!" reviewed Caroline Banks in The Washington Post, "Richard Setlowe has made them—in part by juxtaposing them to the elegant 'pillared mansions of the senior officers along Walnut Avenue'—seem as sinister as the House of Usher. They are 'a great desolate armada—aircraft carriers, battle cruisers, assault transports, destroyers and submarines—all packed stem to stern in tight rows along the length of a narrow bleak pier.' " As in The Experiment, Setlowe creates a convincing scientific framework for the supernatural.

=== The Black Sea ===
Setlowe's fourth novel, The Black Sea, was a nominee for the PEN West Literary Award in Fiction. Published in 1991, this tale of terror set in Southeast Asia presaged a post-9/11 world in which piracy, ancient ethnic conflicts and ideological zealotry threaten to undermine the hegemony of the superpowers, despite the advantages of their military and technological superiority. As a thriller and gripping sea adventure, The Black Sea's clash between a lone U.S. Navy frigate and the mysterious cultures of the Far East and the Muslim fundamentalist world drew critical attention. J. C. Pollock, author of Goering's List, observed presciently, "The Black Sea ushers in [the] new era [for the adventure novel] with a masterfully told tale so real it could be true."

The Black Sea dramatizes historical events—the Iran-Contra guns for hostages affair, which came to light in 1986, and the 1985 hijacking of the Italian cruise ship Achille Lauro—and anticipates the future. The Islamic fundamentalism and piracy portrayed in Setlowe's thriller not only reflects the zeitgeist of its time but also foresees with uncanny accuracy events that would take center stage in world affairs a decade later. The novel has been republished by the authoritative Naval Institute Press as one of the "exceptional works on naval and military subjects".

=== The Sexual Occupation of Japan (The Deal, in paperback) ===
The menace of past lives colliding with the present explored in The Haunting of Suzanna Blackwell is a theme Setlowe revisits in his fifth novel, The Sexual Occupation of Japan (1999). Again, moldering memories and the psychic scars of wartime, this time World War II Japan and Vietnam, propel the main characters toward an uncertain future.

The starred Kirkus Review said, "First-rate adult melodrama about the globalization of entertainment and communications networks, not to mention intellectual and spiritual maturity in high finance". Setlowe's novel, however, focuses on interwoven histories—a main character whose personal experiences and memories pit him against contemporary adversaries seething over bitter grievances fomented in wartime Japan.

Feminist critics have argued the book perpetuates a literary tradition of fetishizing Japanese women. The book begins with an act of literal reciprocity for the metaphorical emasculation of Japanese men bent on revenge for the humiliations suffered at the hands of American occupiers. The gruesome "night letter" nailed on Saxon's hotel room door recalls the true story of geisha Sada Abe, well known in Japan for having carried her lover's severed genitalia in her handbag after killing him by erotic asphyxiation. Abe's notoriety gained international infamy primarily through Nagisa Oshima's film, In the Realm of the Senses (1976). Narrelle Morris regards Setlowe's scene as an example of his story's cultural mythologizing with specific reference to Sada Abe's story.

Conversely, other reviewers credit the author with a deft and thoughtfully provocative characterization of the story's protagonists and historical context. Ronnie Terpening, in a starred review for Library Journal, encapsulated The Sexual Occupation of Japan: "Setlowe tells an intelligent and engrossing story of love and war, one crafted with exquisite skill, richly detailed, insightful in its implications…."

=== Plays ===
- Norma Jean & Johnny (2010)
- The Apple That Fell Far From the Tree (2007)

Setlowe's play The Apple That Fell Far From the Tree was staged at the East West Players' David Henry Hwang Theater in Los Angeles in May 2007. Norma Jean & Johnny was staged at the Blank Theatre in Hollywood in March 2010. Setlowe regards both plays as works in progress.
