= Charles Evans (American businessman) =

American business leader

- Born: May 13, 1926; Manhattan, New York City, New York, U.S.
- Died: June 2, 2007 (aged 81); Manhattan, New York City, New York U.S.
- Occupations: Founder, Evan-Picone fashion house; motion picture producer
- Spouse(s): Frances (div. 1967); second wife (name and dates of marriage not known); Debra Elaine Huff Evans (m. 1989-1995); Bonnie Lynn Pfeifer Evans (m. 2005; survived him)
- Children: Elizabeth (died 1975); Melissa (died 1975); Charles Jr.
- Parent(s): Archie and Florence (Krasne) Shapera
- Family: Robert Evans (brother)

Charles Evans (May 13, 1926 — June 2, 2007) was an American business leader. He co-founded the fashion house Evan-Picone in 1949 and sold it to Revlon in 1962. He and his brother-in-law, Michael Shure, then founded Evans Partnership, a real estate investment firm. In 1981, he purchased the screenplay for the comedy Tootsie (1982). His brother Robert Evans produced numerous motion pictures, including Rosemary's Baby (1968), The Godfather (1972), and Chinatown (1974).

== Early life ==
Evans was born Charles Shapera on May 13, 1926, in Manhattan, New York, in the United States, to Archie and Florence (Krasne) Shapera. His father was a dentist with a successful practice in Harlem. He had a younger brother, Robert, and sister, Alice. While in his late teens, Charles' father asked his sons to change their last name to their paternal grandmother's maiden name of "Evan". (The name change was seen as a way of honoring her, as she had only a short time to live.) Charles and Robert added the "s" as an homage to the Shapera family name. Charles was something of a conformist as a teenager. He graduated from the Horace Mann School in New York City, and attended the University of Miami.

He began serving in the United States Army in 1944 during World War II, and left military service in 1946.

== Business career ==
After leaving the Army, Evans found work in an aunt's clothing store in New York City as a salesman. In 1949, Evans conceived of adding a fly to women's skirts. He approached Joseph Picone, a 31-year-old tailor and immigrant from Sicily who made clothes for Archie Evans, and asked him to manufacture a sample. With seed money from Evans' father, Evans and Picone formed a company that same year named Evan-Picone to make and sell their product. (To make the company name easier to pronounce, the "s" was dropped from Evans.) Picone set up an assembly line to manufacture the skirts in a storefront located at Fifth Avenue and East 46th Street. The company was the first to use darts in the pockets of women's clothing, to inhibit rips and tears. The skirts were a sudden success, and the company quickly expanded into high-end, hand-stitched women's slacks as well. Evans hired his mother, Florence, to be the chief sales manager. He also hired his brother Robert as a salesman. Charles Evans became one of the first celebrity fashion designers. Within two years, Evans, his brother, and Picone were millionaires. In 1962, Revlon purchased Evan-Picone for $12 million in cash.

After the sale of his clothing firm, Evans spent several years looking for something to do. He remained under contract with Revlon until 1966. At one point, Evans became interested in designer kitchen appliances, like can openers. But real estate proved more attractive. Evans' sister, Alice, had married the architect Michael Shure. In 1966, Evans and Shure formed Evans Partnership, a real estate investment and development company. The firm purchased its first site (in Fairfield, New Jersey) six months later. The first office building erected by Evans Partnership was a 55,000 square feet (5,100 m^{2}) building for Becton Dickinson, the medical equipment company. The United States Life Insurance Company invested in the firm in 1974, becoming a limited partner. Over the next several decades, Evans Partnership erected speculative office buildings and constructed headquarters for AT&T, the Bell System, Johnson & Johnson, the Singer Corporation aerospace division, and other corporations. He and Shure also financed the construction of 1099 14th Street NW in Washington, D.C.—which, at the time it was built, had the tallest tower in the city. William Webber, a financial investment consultant who worked for the firm, said that Evans' status as a fashion magnate and brother to a movie studio executive lent an air of celebrity to the firm that often convinced banks to lend Evans Partnership money to construct more speculative structures. At the time of Evans' death, Evans Partnership had constructed more than 6,000,000 square feet (560,000 m^{2}) of office space. In 1988, Evans retired from active participation in Evans Partnership, creating a holding company to manage his real estate investments.

With Robert Evans' success as a film producer and motion picture studio executive, Charles Evans decided to get into movie-making as well. He told the Los Angeles Times in 1995 that he got into producing "because I enjoy movies very much. I have the time to do it. And I believe if done wisely, it can be a profitable business." His first foray into film production was a massive success. Playwright Don McGuire had written a play in the early 1970s about an unemployed male actor who cross-dresses in order to get jobs. Titled Would I Lie to You?, the play was shopped around Hollywood for several years until it came to the attention of comedian and actor Buddy Hackett in 1978. Hackett, interested in playing the role of the talent agent, showed the script to Evans. Evans purchased an option on the play. (Delays in the film's production forced Evans to renew the option once or twice.) During 1979, Evans co-wrote a screenplay based on the film with director Dick Richards and screenwriter Bob Kaufman. A few months into the writing process, Richards showed it to actor Dustin Hoffman. Hoffman and Richards were partners in a company which bought and developed properties for development into films. Hoffman wanted complete creative control, and Evans agreed to remove himself from screenwriting tasks. Instead, Evans became a producer on the film, which was renamed Tootsie.

Evans' next projects did not fare so well. In 1986, Evans met with horror film director George A. Romero. Evans invested $450,000 in the film, Monkey Shines, and received $500,000 as a producer's fee. Evans later claimed to have been "involved in every aspect of production". He also said that the film hadn't made him any money in the 10 years since its release. In 1992, Evans met with screenwriter Joe Eszterhas, who pitched an idea about Las Vegas showgirls. Director Paul Verhoeven, also present during the pitch, wanted to direct the film. Evans paid Eszterhas $2 million in cash to write the screenplay. Carolco Pictures purchased the screenplay from Evans for $2 million and gave him another $1 million for producing the motion picture. The film, Showgirls, was both a box office and critical disaster.

Robert Evans published his memoir, The Kid Stays in the Picture, in 1994. Charles Evans appears in the film and receives "thank you" credits at the end.

Charles Evans was also interested in sailing. His yacht, the 105-foot (32 m) long Ondine VIII (built in 1988), was, according to the Bermuda Sun newspaper, "considered at the time one of the world's most elegant sailing yachts".

== Personal life ==
Charles Evans married his second wife, Frances, a documentary filmmaker, in 1960. The couple had three children: Charles Jr. (1963), Melissa (1965), and Elizabeth (1966). The couple divorced in 1967. In 1975, Frances and her two daughters were asphyxiated by toxic fumes during a fire in their apartment building on East 80th Street in New York City. The fire was caused by ashes falling out of their fireplace. Charles Jr., sleeping in another room, was rescued by firefighters and uninjured. After the disaster, Charles Evans founded the Crusade for Fire Detection. The nonprofit educated the public about the life-saving nature of smoke detectors, and lobbied cities and states to enact fire codes requiring them in all buildings.

Charles Evans married twice more, the fourth time in the 1990s. Both marriages ended in divorce. In January 2005, the 79-year-old Evans married 50-year-old model and nonprofit executive Bonnie Lynn Pfeifer.

== Death ==
Charles Evans died from complications of pneumonia at NewYork–Presbyterian Hospital on June 2, 2007. An adherent of the Jewish faith, Evans' funeral service was held at Congregation Emanu-El in New York City on June 7.

== Charitable activities and honors ==
In addition to his fire safety crusade, Charles Evans was involved in a number of charitable activities. His father, Archie Shapera, suffered from Alzheimer's disease in the late 1960s. Evans made large donations to various Alzheimer's research efforts throughout his life. He later was national director of the Alzheimer's Association.

In 1988, Evans founded the Charles Evans Foundation to carry on his wide range of interests in charitable giving. Among its more notable donations was a $1 million gift to the University Medical Center of Princeton at Plainsboro. A rehabilitation exercise facility for cardiac and stroke patients was named the Charles Evans Pulmonary Rehabilitation Gym, and a surgical procedures suite names the Charles Evans Procedures Room in his honor. In 2009, through a $1 million gift from the foundation, the Westphal College at Drexel University in Philadelphia created the Charles Evans Fashion Design Library and established an award scholarship that covers tuition costs for a Fashion Design student in their senior year. In 2010, the foundation donated $1 million to the FDNY Foundation for fire safety education. The New York City Fire Department named its fire safety headquarters at Fort Totten the Charles Evans Fire Safety Education Building in his honor. In 2011, the foundation built a state-of-the-art healthcare facility for people with developmental disabilities for a nonprofit group, Adults and Children with Learning and Developmental Disabilities Inc. The building was named the Charles Evans Health Services Center.

In 2006, Fireman magazine honored Evans with an award for his fire safety efforts over the past 25 years.

== Bibliography ==
- Cook, Philip S.; Gomery, Douglas; and Lichty, Lawrence Wilson. American Media: The Wilson Quarterly Reader. Washington, D.C.: Wilson Center Press, 1989.
- Evans, Robert. The Kid Stays in the Picture. Beverly Hills, Calif.: New Millennium Press, 1994.
- McDougal, Dennis. The Last Mogul: Lew Wasserman, MCA, and the Hidden History of Hollywood. New York: Da Capo Press, 1998.
- Thompson, Kristin. Storytelling in the New Hollywood: Understanding Classical Narrative Technique. 2d ed. Cambridge, Mass.: Harvard University Press, 2001.
- Trager, James. The New York Chronology: The Ultimate Compendium of Events, People and Anecdotes From the Dutch to the Present. New York: HarperCollins, 2004.
