= Michael Stewart (British writer, born 1945) =

British writer and entrepreneur (born 1945)

(Hugh) Michael Bonnin Stewart (born 25 June 1945) is a British writer and entrepreneur.

== Early career ==
Having taken an MA (Oxon) from Christ Church, Oxford (where he read "Greats") and an MBA from INSEAD (Institut Europeen d'Administration des Affaires), Michael Stewart joined PA Management Consultants in London as a Senior Consultant and later the Northern Ireland Finance Corporation as a Senior Executive. For a period thereafter, he became variously involved in turnkey construction projects in Saudi Arabia, international oil and gas broking and trading in liquidated consumer stocks.

== Writing ==
In 1983 he entered on a career as a novelist and, later, screenwriter. After two political thrillers ("Twilight Strike" and "The 51st"), he began developing the genre for which he became known - psychological thrillers turning on breaking scientific developments. The first, "Monkey Shines", was adapted in 1988 into the American horror film of the same name. He published a further seven in the same genre. In 1995 he turned to television, devising, co-writing and executive-producing the drama series "Bliss" for ITV and a feature-length film for BBC-1 entitled "Breakout."

He has spoken widely on science in the arts and the place of science in the creative imagination. He was a speaker and moderator on the topic for three years at the World Economic Forum at Davos, and in 1996 he won the Grand Prix prize for the Public Awareness of Science and Engineering (PAWS).

== Recent career ==
Since 2000, he has been involved in the development of an advanced hybrid air vehicle. This revolutionary design combines the aerostatic lift of a conventional airship with the aerodynamic lift of an aeroplane to create a wholly new air vehicle capable of carrying payloads up to 1,000 tons and able to land on virtually any terrain without need of ground infrastructure. He continues to develop concepts and scripts for film and television while working on a novel set in the future.

== Family ==
Michael Stewart married Martine Brant (writer of television series The Devil's Whore and New Worlds) in 1989. They lived at Wytham Abbey, Oxford, which was subsequently sold to the charity Effective Ventures.

== Bibliography ==
- Twilight Strike, Arrow Books, 1980
- The 51st, Arrow Books, 1982
- Monkey Shines, Macmillan, 1983
- Far Cry, Macmillan, 1984
- In the Bees and Honey (as Bob Shilling), Coronet, 1985
- Blindsight, Macmillan, 1987
- Prodigy, Macmillan, 1988
- Grace, HarperCollins, 1989
- Birthright, HarperCollins, 1990
- Belladonna, HarperCollins,1992
- Compulsion, HarperCollins, 1994

== Filmography ==
- 1988 — Monkey Shines (Director – George Romero)
- 1991 — Eye of the Storm
- 1995 — Bliss (Pilot; ITV)
- 1997 — Breakout (Director — Moira Armstrong; BBC1)
- 1997 — Bliss (4 Episodes; ITV)
