= Bliss (1995 TV series) =

- VHS cover
- Genre: Science fiction thriller
- Created by: Michael Stewart
- Directed by: Marc Evans
- Starring: Simon Shepherd; Sian Webber; Sarah Smart; Zoë Hart; Anthony Smee; Jonathan Hyde; Reece Dinsdale; Eva Marie Bryer; Jennifer Hilary
- Composer: Daemion Barry
- Country of origin: United Kingdom
- Original language: English
- No. of series: 1
- No. of episodes: 5

Production
- Producers: Dominic Fulford; Jacky Stoller
- Cinematography: Nicholas D. Knowland
- Editor: John Wilson
- Running time: 90 minutes
- Production companies: Abbey Films Productions; Carlton Television

Original release
- Network: ITV
- Release: 11 October 1995 – 3 July 1997

Bliss is a British television science fiction thriller series first broadcast on 11 October 1995. It ran for a total of five episodes on ITV. The series starred Simon Shepherd as Dr. Sam Bliss, a medical research scientist based at Cambridge University, and widowed father-of-two, who often finds himself investigating bizarre and unexplained deaths, with the help of his assistant, Dr. Melanie Kilpatrick (Sian Webber). Initially broadcast as a single stand-alone pilot episode in 1995, Bliss spawned a run of four episodes, which followed in 1997.

The initial pilot was directed by Marc Evans and written by novelist Michael Stewart. Jonathan Hyde, Reece Dinsdale and Jennifer Hilary co-starred in the pilot, alongside Sarah Smart and Zoë Hart, who later reprised their roles for the series. The initial pilot drew a viewing audience of approximately 10 million, while viewing figures for the series averaged around 7 million. In 2000, both the pilot episode and series were released on VHS via Carlton Television. Neither the pilot episode, nor the series, have been released on DVD.

== Cast ==
- Simon Shepherd as Dr. Sam Bliss (Pilot — All Fall Down)
- Sian Webber as Dr. Melanie Kilpatrick (Pilot — All Fall Down)
- Sarah Smart as Zoe Bliss (Pilot — All Fall Down)
- Zoë Hart as Louise Bliss (Pilot — All Fall Down)
- Anthony Smee as Dr. Graham Fairfax (In Memoriam — All Fall Down)
- Jonathan Hyde as Dr. Oliver Pleasance (Pilot)
- Reece Dinsdale as Dr. Clive Sussman (Pilot)
- Eva Marie Bryer as Serena Snowden (Pilot)
- Jennifer Hilary as Tamara Bancroft (Pilot)
- John Normington as Albert Fowler (Pilot)
- Deborah Norton as Dorothy Snowden (Pilot)
- Peter Penry-Jones as Jeffrey Snowden (Pilot)
- Kate Buffery as Dr. Gaynor Hands (Pilot, Enemy Within)
- Sophie Stanton as DC Paula White (Pilot, Enemy Within)
- Scot Williams as Geoff Croft (Pilot, In Memoriam)

== Episodes ==
=== Pilot (1995) ===
No.	Title	Directed by	Written by	British air date
1	"Pilot"	Marc Evans	Michael Stewart	11 October 1995
Dr. Sam Bliss (Simon Shepherd) is working on a cure for the common cold at a research centre when he stumbles across a genetic ageing preventative being worked on by his colleagues, Dr. Oliver Pleasance (Jonathan Hyde) and Dr. Clive Sussman (Reece Dinsdale), who have been inspired by the Duboys, a family whose members have been known to live for up to 150 years, due a special combination in their genes. While tracking down the remaining members of the family, Bliss and Pleasance find out they are not the only ones interested in the Duboys, and they soon become embroiled in a series of murders involving the remaining members of the family. Could there be a link of some sort?

=== Series (1997) ===
No.	Title	Directed by	Written by	British air date
1	"In Memoriam"	Richard Standeven	Richard McBrien	12 June 1997
Sam is working on a malaria vaccine, but the work is suspended when a student dies during trials. When a second student dies, Sam decides to investigate.
2	"Enemy Within"	Simon Shore	Charles Brent	19 June 1997
Whilst travelling by train, Zoe sees a girl die from multiple stab wounds. Sam reports the matter to the police, but they can find no evidence to support her story. When, the next day, a murder occurs exactly as Zoe described, Sam decides to investigate.
3	"A Far Cry"	Simon Shore	Richard McBrien	26 June 1997
Sam accidentally runs over a teenage boy, causing head injuries in the process. He takes the boy to hospital, but his mother has him discharged. Investigating further, Sam discovers that the boy suffers from fits, blackouts and mood swings, but that his mother will not take him to see a doctor. When he discovers that the boy has severe bruising, he decides to take matters into his own hands.
4	"All Fall Down"	Crispin Reece	Simon Eden	3 July 1997
Sam is asked to provide a second opinion when a pathologist is unable to determine the cause of death of a man from a small village in Norfolk. Unusual symptoms which the victim was suffering from at the time of death prompt Sam to investigate further. When a second victim dies in similar circumstances, Sam suspects an outbreak of bubonic plague. Meanwhile, Sam begins to find himself increasingly attracted to Melanie (Sian Webber), and struggles to find time for Zoe (Sarah Smart) and Louise (Zoë Hart).
