= Monkey Shines (film) =

1988 film by George A. Romero

- Theatrical release poster
- Directed by: George A. Romero
- Screenplay by: George A. Romero
- Based on: Monkey Shines by Michael Stewart
- Produced by: Charles Evans
- Starring: Jason Beghe; John Pankow; Kate McNeil; Joyce Van Patten
- Cinematography: James A. Contner
- Edited by: Pasquale Buba
- Music by: David Shire
- Production company: Orion Pictures
- Distributed by: Orion Pictures
- Release date: July 29, 1988
- Running time: 113 minutes
- Country: United States
- Language: English
- Budget: $7 million
- Box office: $5.3 million

Monkey Shines (also known as Monkey Shines: An Experiment in Fear) is a 1988 American science fiction psychological horror film written and directed by George A. Romero and starring Jason Beghe, Kate McNeil, John Pankow, and Joyce Van Patten. Its plot follows a young athlete who becomes a paralyzed quadriplegic, and develops a bond with an intelligent service monkey named "Ella" who becomes homicidal after she is injected with an experimental serum of human brain tissue. It is based on the 1983 British novel of the same title by Michael Stewart.

Producers Peter Grunwald and Charles Evans of Orion Pictures acquired the rights to Stewart's novel in 1985, and began production two years later, with Romero assigned to direct. The film marked Romero's first major studio feature, and was his second-most expensive film at that time, with a budget of $7 million. The setting was changed from Oxford, England, where the novel was set, to Pittsburgh, Pennsylvania, a city in which Romero had long resided and often set his films. Principal photography of Monkey Shines took place in Pittsburgh in the late summer and early fall of 1987. It had a protracted post-production and editing process, as Romero shot more film than he had on any of his previous projects, particularly due to the use of live monkeys.

Monkey Shines was released theatrically by Orion Pictures in July 1988, receiving mixed reviews and a lackluster box-office reception, grossing $5.3 million against its $7 million budget. In the intervening years, the film has been noted by critics as an offbeat entry in Romero's filmography, and has earned status as a minor cult film.

== Plot ==
Law student and athlete Allan Mann is struck by a truck and rendered quadriplegic following surgery. As his domineering mother and uncaring nurse care for him, Allan, now in an SNP-equipped wheelchair, struggles to adjust. His friend, Geoffrey Fisher, suggests he get a capuchin monkey as a service animal to lift his spirits and help around the house. Geoffrey has an ulterior motive: he is a research scientist under pressure to produce results from his monkey studies. Geoffrey has dosed one of his monkeys with a serum derived from a human brain to boost her intelligence, and believes the serum's effects will be amplified if the monkey is around humans.

Geoffrey enlists Melanie Parker, a specialist in training helper monkeys and provides the capuchin monkey he has been experimenting on, claiming it is normal. Allan names the monkey Ella, and he and Melanie work closely training her. Initially, Ella is a huge help to Allan, and Allan simultaneously grows very close to Melanie.

Allan becomes short-tempered and resentful, and Ella, too, becomes aggressive. Allan dreams of running through the grass at night, and comes to believe he has a telepathic link with Ella, whom he suspects can escape the house. Geoffrey finds evidence confirming this but, pleased with Ella's intelligence, does not tell Allan and Melanie. After Allan's uncaring nurse Maryanne's pet bird pesters him, Allan wishes it was gone. That night, Ella kills the bird and leaves it in Maryanne's slipper, causing her to quit in a rage.

Allan gets a second opinion about his paralysis and discovers he may have been misdiagnosed; another surgery may enable him to walk again. Before attempting the risky surgery, the doctor needs Allan to demonstrate some ability to willingly move an appendage. Rather than feeling happy at this news, Allan is furious with his original surgeon who is incompetent and egotistical as well as now dating Allan's former girlfriend Linda. He fantasizes about burning the doctor's cabin down. That night, Ella kills the surgeon and Linda by burning down the cabin.

After seeing the fire in a vision and hearing the news from his mother, the horrified Allan becomes convinced that Ella is carrying out his dark impulses. He also realizes that when he is around Ella, he becomes easily enraged. Allan demands that Geoffrey take Ella away. With Ella gone, Allan becomes more relaxed; he spends the weekend at Melanie's house and the two have sex.

Allan returns home and tries to make up with his mother, but feels a burst of rage at her contempt for Melanie, and realizes that Ella must be nearby. Allan's mother ignores his desperate warnings for her to leave, and instead goes to take a bath. Ella kills her by dropping a hairdryer into the tub, electrocuting her. Allan briefly answers a call from Melanie before Ella disables the phone. Realizing Allan may be in trouble, Melanie departs for his house.

Geoffrey arrives and confesses that Ella was an experimental subject. The enraged Allan demands Geoffrey leave, upset at being used for an experiment yet concerned for his safety with Ella around. Instead, Geoffrey pursues Ella around the house, intending to put her down with a syringe of sodium pentobarbitone he has brought. Ella gets hold of a syringe and injects it into Geoffrey, killing him.

Ella returns to Allan, who is filled with self-loathing because he believes that Ella is acting out his own impulses. He screams at Ella, but she responds by urinating on him. Melanie arrives and Ella attacks her. This convinces Allan that Ella is not simply carrying out his desires, but is acting out of jealousy. Melanie falls and is knocked unconscious. As Allan rages at Ella, she ignores him and attempts to inject Melanie with Geoffrey's other syringe of phenobarbitol. Allan calms himself and moves his right arm to engage his tape deck. As peaceful music plays, he lovingly summons Ella to cuddle close to him, and she assents. When Ella comes near enough, Allan bites her on the neck and wrenches her body against the frame of his wheelchair and into his tape deck, killing her.

Now that he has demonstrated a voluntary movement, the surgery can be performed and is a success. Melanie arrives at the hospital to pick him up, and Allan stands up from his wheelchair and gets into the van with her.

== Cast ==
- Jason Beghe as Allan Mann
- John Pankow as Geoffrey Fisher
- Kate McNeil as Melanie Parker
- Joyce Van Patten as Dorothy Mann
- Christine Forrest as Maryanne Hodges
- Stephen Root as Dean Burbage
- Stanley Tucci as Dr. John Wiseman
- Janine Turner as Linda Aikman
- William Newman as Doc Williams
- Tudi Wiggins as Esther Fry
- Tom Quinn as Charlie Cunningham
- Patricia Tallman as Party Guest
- David Early as Anesthetist
- Boo as Ella
  - Frank Welker as Ella (vocalizations)

== Analysis ==
Film scholar Tony Williams interprets Monkey Shines as a "complex film dealing with the ambiguous nature of human motivations," and humans' inability to deal with the consequences of their own desires.

Journalist Michael Wilmington notes that the film's thematic weight rests in the presentation of the antagonistic monkey, Ella: "The audience that rejects her as a little toy-terror--or the movie as a piece of icy misanthropy which perversely trashes women, animals and quadraplegics--misses the point. Watching this movie, one loves Ella, bleeds for her, wishes desperately to preserve her from harm. But hell and humanity carry their own demands."

== Production ==
=== Development ===
United Artists had originally optioned Michael Stewart's novel, Monkey Shines (1983), for a film adaptation in 1984, having purchased the rights for $20,000. The option included film rights to another novel by Stewart, Far Cry (1984). However, seven months later, in 1985, the option expired, after which producer Charles Evans purchased the rights to the novel.

Executive producer Gerald Paonessa commented that he had wanted George A. Romero to direct, as he felt he "had a wonderful, dark sense of humor." Romero was convinced to direct after being shown script treatments of the project.

=== Filming ===
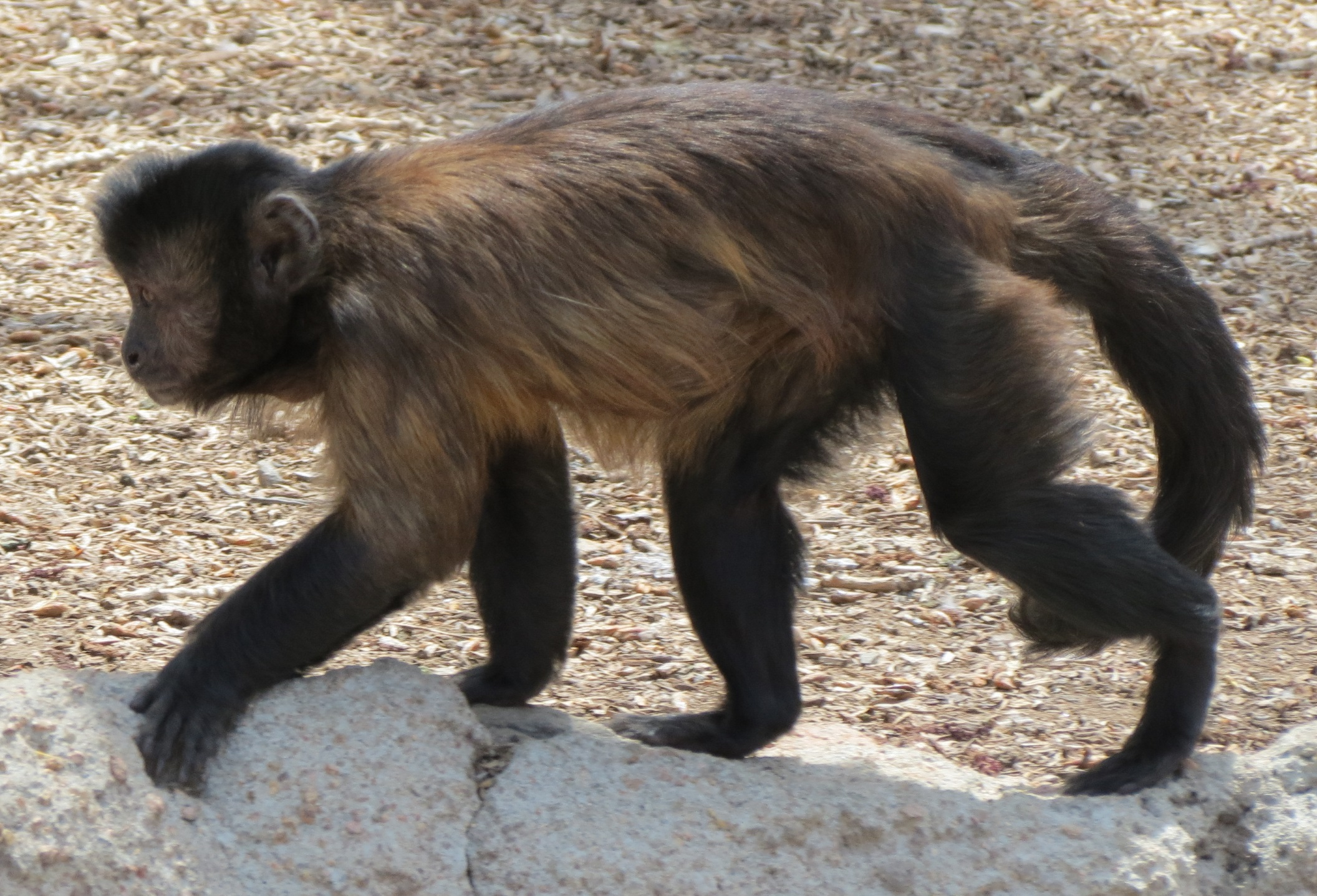
The film features Boo, a Capuchin monkey, similar to the one pictured

Monkey Shines marked Romero's second feature film produced with a major studio, after 1982's Creepshow, as well as the second most-expensive. The production budget was approximately $7 million. The film was shot in Pittsburgh, Pennsylvania, with principal photography beginning on July 31, 1987. Romero, a longtime resident of Pittsburgh who set most of his prior films there, chose the location. Additional filming occurred at the Mellon Institute at Carnegie Mellon University, as well as a private barn in Murrysville, which was converted into the monkey training center which Melanie operates. Interiors of Allan's house were constructed by set designer Cletus Anderson, a longtime collaborator of Romero's.

The film's shooting schedule was extensive, consisting of twelve-hour days. Romero's wife and assistant, Christine (who also appears in the film) commented that it was the "toughest shoot we've ever had." For filming Boo, the capuchin monkey portraying Ella, Romero required multiple monkey doubles. Additionally, four puppets of the monkey were designed by Tom Savini, one of which was remote-controlled, each adorned with yak fur. Helping Hands, a service animal program from Boston, assisted with the monkeys featured in the film. Filming concluded in October 1987.

=== Post-production ===
At the time of filming, Romero commented that "Post-production on this will be very heavy. I hope to be finished by the end of March. It's a huge edit. I'm shooting more film than I ever have because of the monkeys... As our budgets grow, everything takes longer." The film's distributor, Orion Pictures, was desperate for a hit, as it was in financial difficulty. First, the studio forced Romero to add a happy ending to the picture, a plot device which the director had long avoided in favor of more ambiguous endings; originally, Romero had intended to conclude the film in the same manner as its source novel, in which Allan does not recover from his accident. Second, after poor previews, the studio recut the film without Romero's knowledge to add a "shock" ending.

Another issue was the film's overall length, as Romero had completed a very long and involved shooting script that numbered over 240 pages. This resulted in a first cut of which 40 to 50% of the shot footage met the cutting room floor in the need to get the film reduced to a practical length. Upset with the way his project had been handled, Romero returned to independent films.

Alternate ending

The original intended ending of the film was unreleased until 2014, when it was included as a bonus feature on its debut Blu-ray release. In the original ending, prior to Dorothy and Geoffrey's deaths, Geoffrey's boss Dean Harold Burbage (Stephen Root) steals the remaining brain tissue serum and injects it into all of Geoffrey's remaining test monkeys. After Allan regains his ability to move on his own, Burbage is assaulted by animal rights protesters who had earlier attacked Geoffrey for experimenting on monkeys. Burbage insults them then returns to the lab where it's discovered that all of the remaining monkeys have completely taken control of his mind.

== Release ==
=== Box office ===
Monkey Shines was released theatrically in the United States on July 29, 1988, opening in 1,181 theaters. It grossed $1.9 million during its opening weekend. It eventually went on to gross a total of $5.3 million in the United States over its 22-week theatrical run.

=== Critical response ===
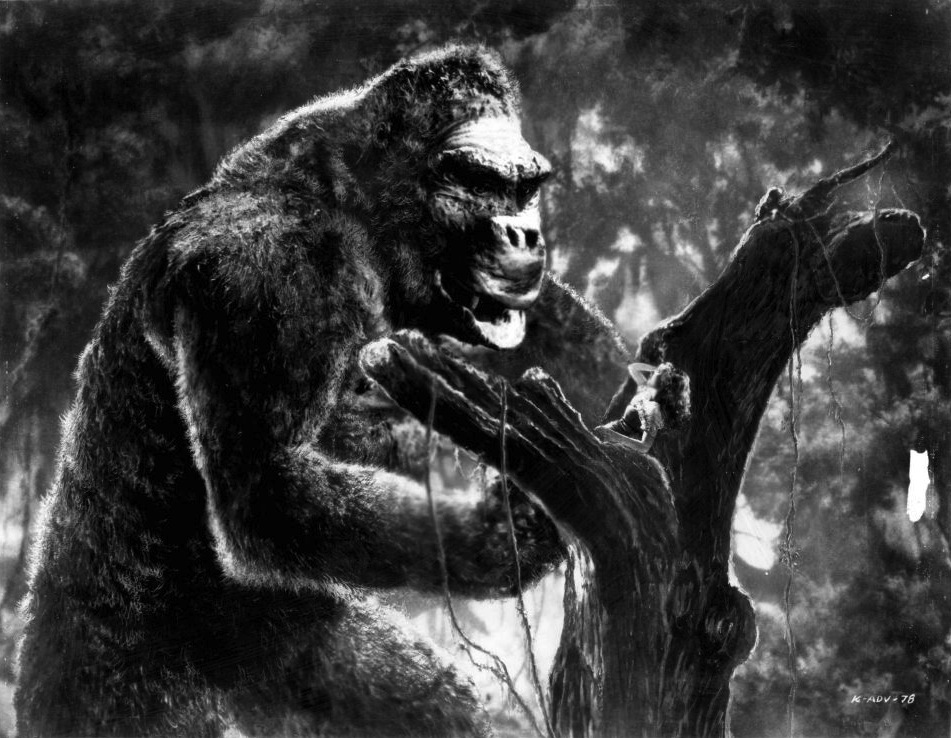
Several critics compared the portrayal of Ella to that of King Kong

Several critics praised Monkey Shines for its portrayal of its philosophical themes: David Kehr of the Chicago Tribune heralded it as Romero's "most complex and challenging creations... [Romero's] is a style of philosophical fiction that seems hardly to belong to the 20th Century at all, but rather to the 18th Century school of Swift, Diderot and Voltaire. Like those authors, he uses satire as one of his principal tools and principal weapons," concluding that, "Monkey Shines is an extremely thoughtful, provocative film; it's also a damn good horror movie."

Other critics, such as the Los Angeles Times's Michael Wilmington, commented on the film's characterization of Ella, and the relationship between her and Allan; comparing Ella to King Kong, Wilmington noted: "The story’s dark pivot is the symbiosis between Allan and Ella: a match made in hell. Ella, preternaturally sensitive to all her master’s desires, becomes infected with his hatreds--just as, in the lab, she’s been made addicted to a serum containing human brain tissue. It’s not a matter of the beast emerging against the human--but of humans perverting the beast." Richard Harrington of The Washington Post made similar observations about the character dynamic: "Alternating between comfort and revenge, [Ella] seems the ultimate victim, an unwitting pawn. Her scenes with Beghe are at once tender and terrifying as they battle it out to see who's the boss. Some closeups make Ella seem as ferocious as King Kong, but at other times she looks as if she's just been kicked out of the Garden of Eden."

Roger Ebert was less enthusiastic about the film, awarding it two and a half out of a possible four stars; the film's main flaw, wrote Ebert, was its being overlong with too many subplots: "Romero loses momentum in the closing passages because he has too many loose ends to keep track of. Somewhere within this movie's two hours or so is hidden an absolutely spellbinding 90-minute thriller." Caryn James of The New York Times panned the film, writing that the screenplay "wraps up more loose ends than anyone cares about, yet leaves some nagging bits of illogic," also criticizing the film for its "calm, and tedious, exposition."

The film was met with criticism from some disability rights organizations such as ADAPT and Adapting Society, due to a depiction of a toy monkey in a wheelchair in initial promotional materials. Members of ADAPT formed a picket line in wheelchairs at the Hollywood Pacific Theater the Saturday of the film's opening weekend. Bill Bolte, a member of Adapt California, commented: "The idea of a monkey attendant turning into a monster is appalling." On August 10, Orion Pictures issued a public apology, removing the content from media advertisements for the film, promising to consult disability experts for promotional materials of upcoming projects.

Monkey Shines holds a 55% approval rating on the internet review aggregator Rotten Tomatoes, based on 33 critic reviews, with its consensus reading: "While not one of horror legend George Romero's more evolved efforts, Monkey Shines delivers enough primal fear to satisfy more forgiving genre enthusiasts." The film possesses a score of 71 on Metacritic based on 14 reviews. Contemporary film scholar John Kenneth Muir deemed Monkey Shines a "harrowing and fascinating film," and praised its realistic depiction of the monkey, Ella.

Several parodies exist, some notable examples are:

- The Malcolm in the Middle episode "Monkey"
- The Simpsons episode "Girly Edition"

=== Home media ===
Metro-Goldwyn-Mayer Home Entertainment released the film on DVD on September 28, 1999. Scream Factory released the film on Blu-ray for the first time in November 2014. In November 2019, Scream Factory announced this Blu-ray would be going out of print in 2020.

== Trailer poem ==
One of the trailers showed a toy monkey banging its cymbals while sitting in a wheel chair. This trailer is known for its poem.

Once there was a man whose prison was a chair. The man had a monkey; they made the strangest pair.

The man was the prisoner; the monkey held the key. No matter how he tried, the man couldn't flee.

Locked in his prison, terrified and frail; The monkey wielding power, keeping him in jail.

The man tried to keep the monkey from his brain, but every move he made became the monkey's game.

The monkey ruled the man, it climbed inside his head. And now as fate would have it... One of them was dead!

== Sources ==
- Muir, John Kenneth (2010). Horror Films of the 1980s. Jefferson, North Carolina: McFarland. ISBN 978-0-786-45501-0.
- Williams, Tony (2015). The Cinema of George A. Romero: Knight of the Living Dead (2nd ed.). New York City, New York: Columbia University Press. ISBN 978-0-231-85075-9.
