= George A. Romero filmography =

List of films involving American-Canadian director George A. Romero

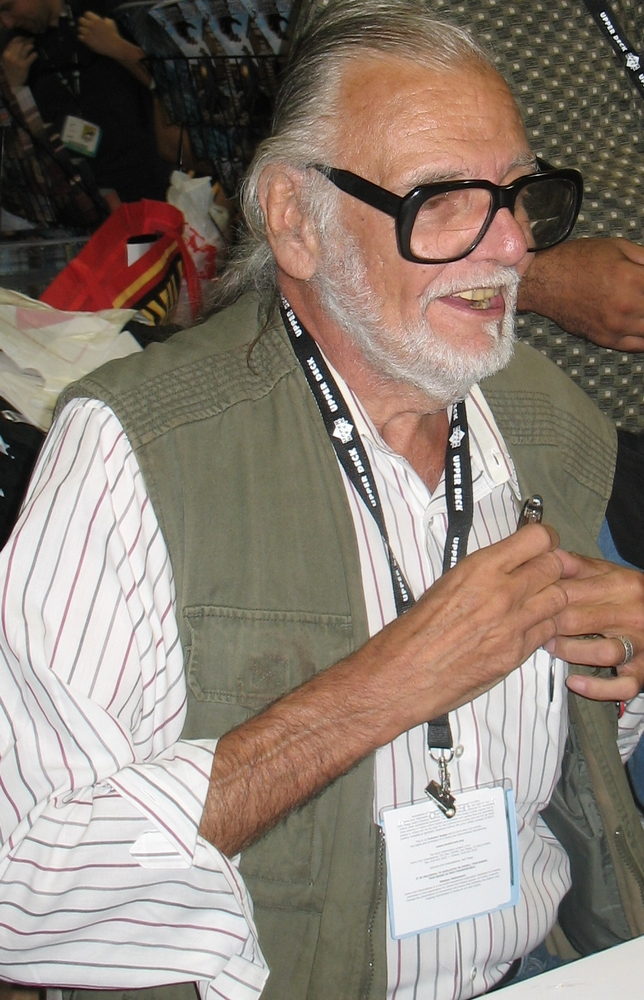
George A. Romero in 2007

George A. Romero (1940–2017) was an American-Canadian film director, writer, editor and cinematographer. He contributed to many projects as either the writer, director, editor, cinematographer or a combination of the four.

Romero's first project was the 1968 horror film Night of the Living Dead, which he produced independently. Romero was also a contributing producer for the anthology television series Tales from the Darkside, which aired from 1983 to 1988.

== Film ==
Year	Title	Director	Writer	Editor	Notes
1968	Night of the Living Dead	Yes	Yes	Yes	Also cinematographer
1971	There's Always Vanilla	Yes	No	Yes	Also cinematographer
1972	Season of the Witch	Yes	Yes	Yes	Also cinematographer
1973	The Crazies	Yes	Yes	Yes	
1975	The Amusement Park	Yes	No	Yes	Mid-length film, produced in 1973. Premiered at the American Film Festival in New York in June 1975 and was a finalist in the competition, but went otherwise unreleased. It was believed lost until a print was discovered in 2017, shortly before Romero's death. It was subsequently given a 4K restoration by IndieCollect, which premiered in 2019.
1977	Martin	Yes	Yes	Yes	
1978	Dawn of the Dead	Yes	Yes	Yes	
1981	Knightriders	Yes	Yes	Yes	
1982	Creepshow	Yes	No	Yes	
1985	Day of the Dead	Yes	Yes	No	
1988	Monkey Shines	Yes	Yes	No	
1990	Two Evil Eyes	Yes	Yes	No	Segment: "The Facts in the Case of Mr. Valdemar"
1993	The Dark Half	Yes	Yes	No	Also executive producer
1994	Jacaranda Joe	Yes	Yes	No	Short film
2000	Bruiser	Yes	Yes	No	
2005	Land of the Dead	Yes	Yes	No	
2007	Diary of the Dead	Yes	Yes	No	
2009	Survival of the Dead	Yes	Yes	No	Also executive producer

=== Writer and/or executive producer only ===
Year	Title	Writer	Executive producer	Notes
1987	Creepshow 2	Yes	No	
1990	Tales from the Darkside: The Movie	Yes	No	Segment: "The Cat from Hell"
1990	Night of the Living Dead	Yes	Yes	
2010	The Crazies	No	Yes	
2027	Twilight of the Dead †	Yes	No	Post-production; upcoming posthumous release

== Television ==
Year	Title	Director	Writer	Executive producer	Editor	Notes
1973–1974	The Winners	Yes	No	Yes	Yes	Documentary series; also cinematographer
1974	O. J. Simpson: Juice on the Loose	Yes	No	No	Yes	Documentary film
1983–1988	Tales from the Darkside	No	Yes	Yes	No	Creator; wrote 4 episodes
1998	Biohazard 2	Yes	No	No	No	Television commercial
2021	Iron City Asskickers (Note: Pilot for a television series, produced in 1998, but went unaired. It was subsequently given a release on DVD and VHS in 2021.)	Yes	No	Yes	Yes	Posthumous release

== Acting roles ==
Year	Title	Role
1968	Night of the Living Dead	Washington Reporter
1973	The Crazies	Mayor
1973	The Amusement Park	"Road Rage" Bumper Car Driver
1978	Martin	Father Howard
1978	Dawn of the Dead	TV Director
1985	Day of the Dead	Zombie with Scarf
1990	Night of the Living Dead	Radio News Commentator
1991	The Silence of the Lambs	FBI Agent in Memphis
2005	Land of the Dead	Puppeteer
2007	Diary of the Dead	Police Chief Arthur Katz
2009	Deadtime Stories	Himself (Host)
2011	Deadtime Stories 2	Himself (Host)
2011	Call of Duty: Call of the Dead	Zombie George A. Romero (voice)
2021	Iron City Asskickers	Bar Patron

=== Documentary appearances ===
- Document of the Dead (1985)
- Drive-In Madness (1987)
- George Romero & The City of the Living Dead (1991)
- The American Nightmare (2000)
- Behind the House: Anatomy of the Zombie Movement (House of the Dead) (2004)
- Midnight Movies: From the Margin to the Mainstream (2005)
- Dead On: The Life and Cinema of George A. Romero (2008)
- Nightmares in Red, White and Blue (2009)
- George A. Romero's Resident Evil (2025, archival footage)

== See also ==
- George A. Romero's unrealized projects

== Bibliography ==
- "George A. Romero - Filmography". Allmovie.
- "George A. Romero on Rotten Tomatoes". Rotten Tomatoes.
