= George A. Romero's unrealized projects =

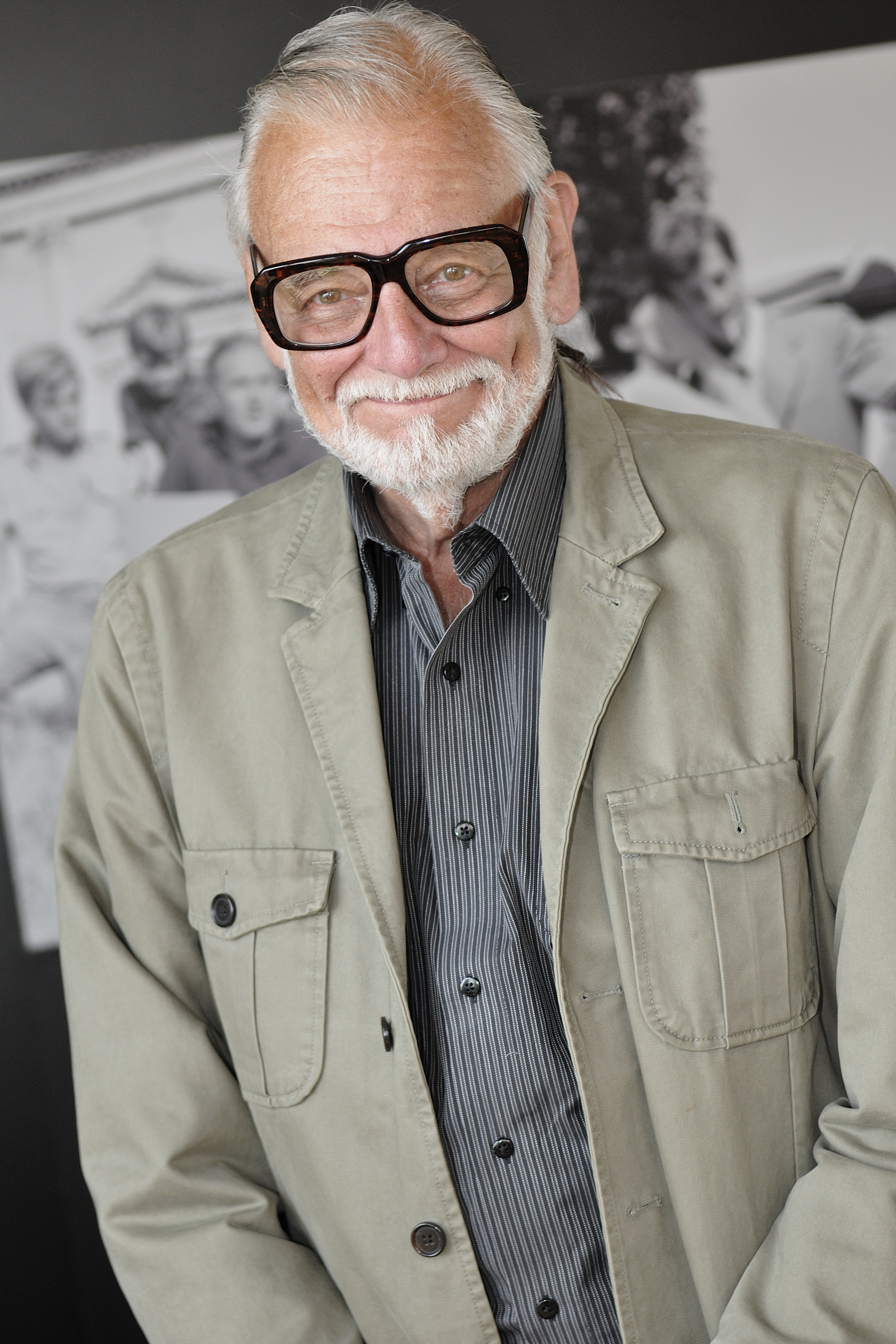
Romero in 2009

During a career that spanned several decades, the American film director George A. Romero worked on a number of projects which never progressed beyond pre-production under him. Some fell into development hell or were produced after he left production.

== 1960s ==
=== Whine of the Fawn ===
In the mid-1960s, Romero initially planned to make his directorial debut with Whine of the Fawn, a Bergman-esque tale that follows the travails of two 15th-century travelers in the Middle Ages. The project would ultimately fail to attract investors and the then 27-year-old Romero would instead make Night of the Living Dead as his first film.

== 1970s ==
=== Gunperson ===
In 1973, it was reported Romero received word that his Western film script Gunperson would shoot in Israel on sets used by Gregory Peck's independent company, as an American-German-French-Israeli coproduction, slated for shooting late that year. The film was a gender-flipped riff on The Magnificent Seven, in which women fill all the roles typically occupied by men and vice versa. According to Romero, they were considering "name talent", including Claudia Cardinale, for the cast, which was to be composed almost entirely of women. In 1978, he completed another draft of the script, which is available at the University of Pittsburgh Library System.

=== The Footage ===
In the mid-1970s, between the releases of The Crazies and Martin, Romero developed a Bigfoot film titled The Footage which never came to fruition. At one point, Pittsburgh Steelers runningback Franco Harris was attached to star. Romero wrote the screenplay for another iteration of a Bigfoot film in the 2000s, titled Cryptid.

=== The Stand ===
In the late 1970s, after finishing work on the horror film Martin, Romero met with horror author Stephen King to discuss possible film adaptations of his works. The first book the two decided to adapt was the apocalyptic horror novel The Stand, which was published in 1978. The two worked on a script that measured over 200 pages, with the goal for the movie to have an R rating. The project was temporarily shelved as King and Romero worked on the film Creepshow, which was released in 1982. After Creepshow, Romero left Laurel Entertainment, a company he had cofounded, and in his absence, other cofounder and film producer Richard P. Rubinstein moved forward with an adaptation of The Stand without Romero's involvement. The novel was ultimately adapted into a television miniseries directed by Mick Garris that aired on ABC in 1994.

=== 'Salem's Lot ===
Romero was initially in discussions for a film adaptation of King's novel 'Salem's Lot, which had been published in 1975. However, Romero left the project after he found out that it would be for a television miniseries and not a feature film. Tobe Hooper replaced Romero as the director for the project, and the miniseries adaptation aired in 1979.

== 1980s ==
=== Shoo-Be-Doo-Be-Moon ===
In January 1980, it was reported that Romero was planning a big studio film to be shot in Pittsburgh later in October that year called Shoo-Be-Doo-Be-Moon, from a script by Rudolph J. Ricci. Not much is known about the project, other than it was set to be an alien invasion musical that parodied classic sci-fi movies from the 1950s. The film went through numerous different iterations before it fell apart, and Romero went on to attempt an actual War of the Worlds remake instead, which got stuck in development hell.

=== Mongrel: The Legend of Copperhead ===
In the early 1980s, Romero was attached to direct a feature film adaptation of a new Marvel Comics character called Copperhead titled Mongrel: The Legend of Copperhead. At the time, it was planned to be the first film adaptation of a Marvel Comics property. However, the project was ultimately cancelled due to a lack of funds from Marvel. Romero would go on to work on other projects, while the first Marvel Comics film adaptation would be Howard the Duck, released in 1986.

=== Mayday ===
In the early 1980s, Romero worked on Mayday, a screenplay written by Paul Larsen based on the book by Thomas Block and Nelson DeMille, which was one of several projects that were proposed as possible follow-ups to Creepshow.

=== Pet Sematary ===
In 1984, author Stephen King made an agreement with Romero, his friend and collaborator at the time, to let him direct a film adaptation of his 1983 novel Pet Sematary, under the conditions that King would write the script and that the film would be shot in King's home state of Maine. Romero agreed, but the project went undeveloped for several years as many film studios were hesitant to greenlight another King adaptation after many of his works had been adapted in the early 1980s. However, during the 1988 Writers Guild of America strike, studios expressed renewed interest in Pet Sematary and the rights were acquired by Paramount Pictures. While King still intended for Romero to direct, Romero was busy doing reshoots for the Orion Pictures film Monkey Shines, and instead the role of director for Pet Sematary went to Mary Lambert.

=== Hoffman: Through the Mansions of the Moon stage musical ===
In 1985, Romero wrote this project for the stage that transmuted The Tales of Hoffmann, one of his favorite films, into a space opera. Titled Hoffman: Through the Mansions of the Moon, it would also have been a musical, with frequent Romero collaborator John Harrison writing the music.

=== The War of the Worlds ===
In 1986, Romero began work on a film adaptation of H. G. Wells' novel The War of the Worlds. The film was set to be produced by Paramount Pictures and was tentatively scheduled to be released in 1987. However, Paramount ultimately abandoned the idea of a motion picture and instead intended for a television program before cancelling the project entirely.

=== The Turn of the Screw ===
Romero was attached to film an adaptation of the Henry James 1898 horror novella The Turn of the Screw for Columbia Pictures, but the project was shelved after David Puttnam left the company in 1987.

=== Apartment Living ===
In 1987, Romero was in pre-production on a science fiction horror film called Apartment Living, about an apartment building that needs to feed on human blood and flesh to keep itself alive. Joe Stillman was hired to write the screenplay, and James A. Baffico was to produce the film, raising $3 million in financing. However, the film's fixed start date was inevitably postponed to October due to the prolonged production of Monkey Shines.

=== Cut Numbers ===
In the late 1980s, Romero wrote an unproduced film script based on the novel Cut Numbers by Nick Tosches.

=== It ===
In 1989, Romero was initially attached to direct a miniseries adaptation for ABC of the Stephen King book It, which was published in 1986. Romero worked with screenwriter Lawrence D. Cohen on a script and consulted with special effects teams for the project, which was planned to be a ten-hour miniseries that would air over the course of five nights. However, executives at ABC were concerned that Romero would make the project too gruesome for network television, and the length of the miniseries was decreased to only four hours over the course of two nights. Unhappy with the network's involvement and with a scheduling conflict over his work on the 1990 remake of Night of the Living Dead, Romero left the project. Tommy Lee Wallace was hired as his replacement, and the miniseries aired in 1990.

== 1990s ==
=== The Mummy remake ===
In the 1990s, Universal Pictures was seeking to create a remake of The Mummy, which was released in 1932. Through the early 1990s, the studio had several directors attached to the project, including Clive Barker and Joe Dante, but their proposals were passed over. In 1994, Romero wrote a draft for the film that Universal turned down for being too dark. Ultimately, Stephen Sommers was attached as director, and the remake was released in 1999.

=== Before I Wake ===
At the same time as The Mummy remake, Romero was developing a haunted house screenplay called Before I Wake at New Line Cinema. It was then taken to MGM, who wouldn't allow him breach his contract in order to direct The Mummy first, which was greenlit at Universal. According to Romero, the film was to have starred Sharon Stone, who turned down a $12 million offer, saying "I'm not going to do a ghost movie." In the early 2000s, Before I Wake was again slated for production, with 20th Century Fox, but was ultimately shelved.

=== Unholy Fire ===
In October 1992, New Line Cinema acquired the rights to Whitley Strieber's horror-suspense novel Unholy Fire for Romero-Grunwald Productions, with Romero set to direct under the company's first-look deal. "It's a very scary, good, solid story," Romero said of the novel. "It's one of those rare stories that works in the way The Exorcist or Jaws works, because you can believe that it really might happen." At the time, Romero-Grunwald reportedly had several projects in development, including three fantasy-horror films, two action-adventure movies and a comedy.

=== The Black Mariah ===
In June 1993, it was reported in Daily Variety that New Line Cinema had acquired the rights to the upcoming supernatural action novel The Black Mariah for Romero to direct through a first-look deal. Based on author Jay Bonansinga's book, the film, reportedly budgeted at close to $8 million, was to be produced by Peter Grunwald and scripted by Bonansinga and Preston Whitmore.

=== Quevira ===
In 1993, Romero tried again to make a Western film, working with co-writer William B. Farmer on a screenplay called Quevira.

=== The Golem ===
In 1995, Romero wrote The Golem, a screenplay re-imagining of the golem myth. Many of the themes from this project would later re-appear in the Resident Evil scripts he'd write two years later.

=== Goosebumps ===
In 2019, the George A. Romero Archival Collection was acquired by the University of Pittsburgh Library System. In 2021, the library system discovered a screenplay that had been written by Romero that was an adaptation of Welcome to Dead House, the first book in the Goosebumps series by author R. L. Stine, which was published in 1992. Additionally, the archives contained a September 1995 letter from Romero to Kevin Bannerman, a vice president of 20th Century Fox's Fox Family division, which stated that Romero was under consideration for the Goosebumps project. The screenplay, which measured 124 pages, roughly follows the same plot as the book, wherein an unsuspecting family more to a new town and discover that their neighbors are undead. The script was dated in March 1996. However the screenplay adds some criticism of capitalism that is not present in the source material and changes some elements of the plot. Romero was one of several filmmakers who expressed interest in adapting Goosebumps during the height of its popularity in the 1990s, and Tim Burton was at one point attached to a project but abandoned it to work on Superman Lives. Romero's screenplay ultimately went undeveloped, and it would take until 2015 that Goosebumps received a film adaptation without Romero's involvement.

=== Monster MASH ===
In 1996, Romero wrote the television script Monster Mash, which featured characters based on all of the Universal Monsters working at a M*A*S*H-style field hospital.

=== Chain Letter ===
In August 1997, it was reported in Daily Variety that Romero was attached to direct Chain Letter, which was in development at Joe Wizan and Don Schneider's Phase 1 Productions. Romero was working on a new draft of Gene Quintano's original script about "three teenagers who must save themselves and their town from supernatural events."

=== Night of the Living Dead TV episode ===
In 1998, Stephen King developed a script for an episode of The X-Files based on Romero's 1968 zombie film Night of the Living Dead. In addition, Romero was slated to direct the episode. According to Frank Spotnitz, the show's staff met with both King and Romero and the two showed an interest in producing the episode. Initially, the episode was slated for the seventh season, but it never came to fruition.

=== Nuns from Outer Space ===
In 1998, Romero wrote a treatment for a proposed TV series titled Nuns from Outer Space, which never saw production.

=== Resident Evil ===
In 1998, Capcom hired Romero to direct a live-action commercial for the survival horror game Resident Evil 2 that only aired in Japan, where the game was known as Biohazard 2. The commercial impressed executives at Sony Pictures who contacted Romero to direct a live action film adaptation of Resident Evil. Romero was regarded as having created the zombie genre with his film Night of the Living Dead and Shinji Mikami, the designer of Resident Evil, was a fan of Romero's zombie films.

Romero wrote a draft within 6 weeks that was largely faithful to the plot of the first game, focusing on the characters Chris Redfield and Jill Valentine and set in Spencer Mansion. However Capcom and Sony passed on Romero's script, with the Capcom producer Yoshiki Okamoto saying, "Romero's script wasn't good, so Romero was fired." The British filmmaker Paul W. S. Anderson directed a 2002 film adaptation of Resident Evil with a plot that differed substantially from the first game and Romero's script. The film is credited with reviving interest in the zombie genre, and Romero directed three other zombie movies in the 2000s.

Romero's unrealized Resident Evil adaptation is the focus of the 2025 documentary film George A. Romero's Resident Evil. The documentary is directed and co-written by Brandon Salisbury, and features Romero's assistant Jason Bareford. The documentary was released on digital on January 7, 2025.

=== The Bell Witch ===
In 1998, Romero wrote a screenplay based on the 1800s Tennessee legend titled The Bell Witch, which was a project he had worked on for decades in different iterations.

=== Carnivore ===
In April 1999, it was reported that Trimark Pictures were reviving an old script written by the Wachowskis called Carnivore, and that they were negotiating with Romero to direct, with production slated to begin in August. Project was described as a surreal gothic fairy tale set in a boarding house where wealthy people disappear under mysterious circumstances.

== 2000s ==
=== The Ill ===
In 2001, Romero co-wrote the screenplay for a horror mystery film titled The Ill, in collaboration with Philip Haydn Arnold, which combined elements of vampirism and plague film subgenres. The story is set at a fictitious New England university and follows the virgin Mattie who fears that she might unknowingly be the vampire who is responsible for the local killings. Romero wanted Asia Argento to play the lead, and also indicated Ryan Phillipe, Linda Fiorentino and Christian Slater as possible co-stars.

=== The Girl Who Loved Tom Gordon ===
In the early 2000s, Romero became involved in adapting The Girl Who Loved Tom Gordon, a 1999 novel by Stephen King, with whom Romero had previously worked on the films Creepshow and The Dark Half. However, the project stalled and was not revived by the time of Romero's death in 2017. In 2019, the project was revived with the involvement of Chris Romero, George's widow.

=== Diamond Dead ===
In 2004, Romero was preparing to direct a zombie-themed musical called Diamond Dead, due to star Asia Argento as a Goth named Aria DeWinter who accidentally kills her favorite rock band and strikes a deal with Death to resurrect them. Set to feature music by Richard Hartley and with Ridley Scott attached to produce, Diamond Dead had several high-profile names circling it, including Johnny Depp and David Bowie, but was ultimately viewed as too risky by the financiers involved. While it was never produced in film form, the project was eventually revived as a stage musical by Dead Rock Productions and performed at various festivals, winning Best Musical Pick at the Capital Fringe Festival in 2008.

=== From a Buick 8 ===
In 2005, Romero announced that he was working on adapting the Stephen King novel From a Buick 8, which was published in 2002. A script was written by Richard Chizmar and Johnathon Schaech and would be produced by start-up film studio Chesapeake Films. However, the studio was unable to get financing for the film and Romero was eventually replaced by Tobe Hooper. As of 2022, the film is in development hell.

=== Zomboid ===
In 2006, Romero wrote several treatments for a proposed television series called, alternately Zombisodes and Zomboid, which was a cartoonish parody on zombie movies in which the "hapless undead protagonist is slashed, shot, blown up, crushed, run over, and otherwise punished over and over again."

=== Solitary Isle ===
In 2006, The Hollywood Reporter announced Romero would write and direct a film based on a short story by Koji Suzuki, author of Ring and Dark Water, called Solitary Isle.

=== Survival of the Dead sequel ===
In 2009, around the time of the release of Survival of the Dead, Romero told Movies.com that he was considering a potential sequel with a "noir flavor," or a jungle adventure with people traveling down the Amazon River.

== 2010s ==
=== Deep Red remake ===
In 2010, Romero was contacted by Claudio Argento to direct a 3D remake of his younger brother Dario Argento's film, Deep Red. Claudio was expected to write the screenplay and told Romero that his brother would also be involved. Romero, who showed interest in the project, decided to contact his longtime friend Dario only to find out that Dario was unaware of a remake and Romero ended up declining Claudio's offer.

=== The Zombie Autopsies ===
In 2011, Romero revealed that his next project would be adapting The Zombie Autopsies, by Steven C. Schlozman.

=== Empire of the Dead ===
In 2015, it was announced at Cannes that the production company Demarest was developing the Empire of the Dead comic series into a TV series. The series was to be written and executive-produced by Romero and Peter Grunwald.

=== Road of the Dead ===
In May 2017, Romero announced plans for 2 upcoming zombie films, the first one was George A. Romero Presents: Road of the Dead, a film that he co-wrote with Matt Birman, who would direct the film making it Romero's second zombie-themed film that he did not direct himself. Romero and Birman along with Matt Manjourides and Justin Martell will produce the film. Birman was the second unit director on Land of the Dead, Diary of the Dead and Survival of the Dead. Birman pitched the idea to Romero ten years earlier, saying the movie is like The Road Warrior meets Rollerball at a NASCAR race, with significant inspiration from Ben-Hur and that "the story is set on an island where zombie prisoners race cars in a modern-day Colosseum for the entertainment of wealthy humans."

On July 13, 2017, Romero released the first poster for Road of the Dead and discussed the plot for the movie saying "it's set in a sanctuary city where this fat cat runs a haven for rich folks, and one of the things that he does is stage drag races to entertain them," Romero told Rue Morgue. "There's a scientist there doing genetic experiments, trying to make the zombies stop eating us, and he has discovered that with a little tampering, they can recall certain memory skills that enable them to drive in these races. It's really The Fast and the Furious with zombies." Romero died three days later leading to reports questioning if the film will ever be made. In 2020, Birman announced that he would finish the film as a tribute-like film to Romero and renamed it, "Wolfe Island." A prequel comic book series based on Romero's Road of the Dead was announced by IDW in July 2018. The 3-part mini-series was released in December 2018.

=== Twilight of the Dead ===
The second zombie film announced by Romero in May 2017 was titled Twilight of the Dead. He penned a film treatment with co-writer Paolo Zelati depicting a conclusion to the series that explains the fate of the zombie protagonists from Land of the Dead and an ending where humanity has become virtually extinct. Romero had written the beginning of the script, and had intended to direct, but the project was stalled when he unexpectedly died in 2017. It was announced in April 2021 that the film had been put back into development under the supervision of Suzanne Romero, with Zelati finishing the script with screenwriters Joe Knetter and Robert L. Lucas. Suzanne told The Hollywood Reporter, "This is the film he wanted to make. And while someone else will carry the torch as the director, it is very much a George A. Romero film." Principal photography wrapped in September 2026, in Kentucky.

== See also ==
- George A. Romero filmography

== Bibliography ==
- Gingold, Michael (July 19, 2017). "George Romero Was a Legend Who Never Got the Respect He Deserved". IndieWire. Penske Media Corporation. Archived from the original on October 6, 2022.
- Perry, Spencer (July 2, 2021). "George A. Romero's Unmade Goosebumps Adaptation Details Land Online". ComicBook.com. Archived from the original on July 3, 2021.
- Squires, John (May 18, 2015). "From Pet Sematary to City of the Dead: 10 Awesome Things George Romero Almost Made". Dread Central. Archived from the original on October 17, 2022.
