= Anthony Dileo Jr. =

American film and stage actor

- Dileo in Day of the Dead, 1985
- Born: Anthony Joseph DiLeo Jr. April 26, 1956
- Died: February 7, 2025 (aged 68); Pittsburgh, Pennsylvania, U.S.
- Education: West Virginia University; Southern Methodist University
- Occupations: Film and stage actor

Anthony Joseph DiLeo Jr. (April 26, 1956 – February 7, 2025), known professionally as Anthony Dileo Jr. and Tim Dileo, was an American film and stage actor. He was best known for playing Private Miguel Salazar, Dr. Sarah Bowman's romantic partner in George A. Romero's 1985 cult classic zombie film Day of the Dead.

== Life and career ==
Dileo was raised in Penn Hills, Pennsylvania. He studied acting at West Virginia University, and attended graduate school at Southern Methodist University. He began his screen career in 1981, appearing in the film Knightriders. In 1985, he played Private Miguel Salazar, Dr. Sarah Bowman's romantic partner in George A. Romero's cult classic zombie film Day of the Dead.

Later in his career, Dileo played Enrique in the film Passed Away. He appeared in films such as Night of the Living Dead, Lorenzo's Oil, Bob Roberts and Two Evil Eyes. During his screen career, in 1985, he starred as Jesus Christ in the stage play Jesus Christ Superstar at the Pittsburgh Playhouse Theatre Company.

Dileo retired from acting in 1994, last appearing in the film Only You.

== Death ==
Dileo died on February 7, 2025, from complications of COVID-19, in Pittsburgh, Pennsylvania, at the age of 68.
