= Edwin Wendler =

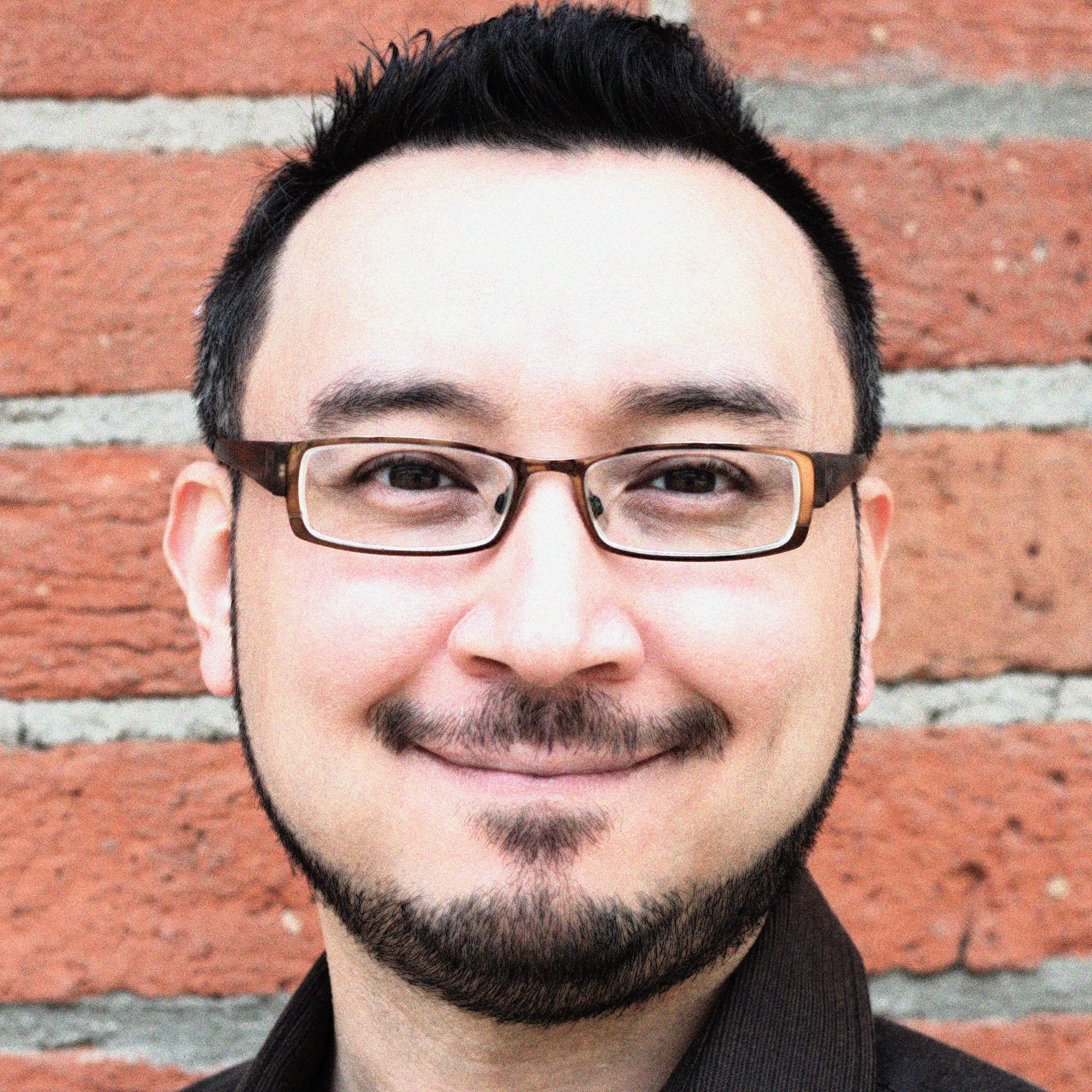
- Composer Edwin Wendler in 2014

Background information
- Born: April 11, 1975
- Occupation(s): Composer, Arranger

Edwin Wendler (born 11 April 1975) is an Austrian composer working in Los Angeles, California.

== Biography ==
Born into a musical family (Wendler's father, Prof. Dr. Anton Wendler, worked as a tenor and assistant director at the Vienna State Opera while his mother had a brief career as an operatic soprano before switching careers to work for the United Nations), Wendler attended the Vienna Choir Boys from 1985 until 1989, participating in four tours around the globe, singing in more than 500 concerts and opera performances, sharing stages with José Carreras, Agnes Baltsa, and Alfredo Kraus, and working with conductors such as Colin Davis and Horst Stein. After his voice changed, Wendler attended the Theresianische Akademie, from which he graduated with honors, in 1993.

Wendler's interest in film music started at around the age of 10, and by the time he graduated from high school, his collection of soundtrack CD's exceeded 1500. From 1996 until 1998, Wendler wrote, directed, and scored several short films for the Austrian independent film company, Magellan-Film. His work was showcased at several independent, local and international film festivals, including the UNICA Festival.

Wendler earned certificates in film scoring and screenwriting from UCLA Extension in 1999. His first concert commission arrived that same year from the University of Ottawa and its choral director, Laurence Ewashko. The resulting piece, Consolatio, for choir and symphony orchestra, received its premiere at St. Joseph's Church, Ottawa, and was subsequently broadcast on local Canadian television stations. In 2004, the piece was performed at Bridgewater Hall, Manchester, by the Stockport Youth Orchestra and five combined choirs from the area. Philip Mackenzie conducted.

After composing music for dozens of short films, Wendler landed his first feature film when writer/director Temi Lopez hired him to score his 2001 movie, Home - The Horror Story, starring Richard Beymer and Grace Zabriskie.

In 2003, Wendler scored JoséAntonio W. Danner’s comedy short film, Hollywood Number. Collaborators on this project: London Metropolitan Orchestra, recording engineer Mike Ross-Trevor, and scoring mixer Dennis S. Sands.

In 2004, Wendler was accepted into the ASCAP Film Scoring Workshop, which concluded with a recording session at 20th Century Fox’s Newman Scoring Stage, with scoring mixer Armin Steiner and the Hollywood Studio Symphony Orchestra.

Also in 2004, film composer Paul Haslinger asked Wendler to join his team as an arranger, orchestrator, and music programmer, resulting in work on the movies Into the Blue, Turistas, The Fifth Commandment, and Gardener of Eden, as well as the second season of the Showtime series, Sleeper Cell. During this time, Wendler also wrote music for the NBC reality series, Fear Factor.

In 2007, Wendler was hired to score the internet series, The Interior (soundtrack released by Perseverance Records as an online exclusive album), and in late 2008 / early 2009, he wrote the music for the U.S. version of the film, Broken Angel.

In November 2009, artistic director and conductor Christopher McCafferty commissioned a piece for a cappella choir from Edwin Wendler. The Illumni Men's Chorale premiered the resulting Winter Medley at its inaugural concerts on December 19 and 20, 2009, in the Seattle area. Illumni commissioned several other pieces from Mr. Wendler during subsequent years.

Producer James Chankin hired Edwin Wendler for four stylistically diverse feature film scores: Christmas with a Capital C (2010), The Mark (2012), Escape (2012), and The Mark: Redemption (2013). Perseverance Records released a soundtrack album for Escape.

In 2010, Mr. Wendler received arranging credit on the comedy feature, Little Fockers, which was scored by composer Stephen Trask. Trask hired Wendler again for the Miley Cyrus-starring comedy, So Undercover.

Composer John Ottman credited Edwin Wendler as orchestrator on the 2010 action movie, The Losers, and subsequently as an arranger and MIDI programmer on the thrillers The Resident (starring Hilary Swank and Jeffrey Dean Morgan) and Unknown, as well as on X-Men: Days of Future Past, The Nice Guys, and X-Men: Apocalypse. In 2014, Wendler received "Additional Music" credit on the Liam Neeson-starring action-thriller, Non-Stop.

Also in 2014, Mr. Wendler's score for the documentary, The Right to Love: An American Family, was nominated for a GoldSpirit Award.

Beginning in 2018, Mr. Wendler composed music for several video games, primarily for Tencent Games and its affiliated studios. In 2020, Mr. Wendler was among the composers honored with a G.A.N.G. Award for his work on the game, Honor Of Kings. Other game credits include PUBG: Battlegrounds, QQ Speed, Call Of Duty: Mobile, and Ring Of Elysium.

Mr. Wendler is a member of the LGBTQIA+ Community.

== Discography ==
=== Solo ===
- Unnatural (OST, 2015) on Varèse Sarabande Records (302 067 382 8)
- Escape (OST, 2012) on Perseverance Records (PRD 058)
- The Right to Love: An American Family (OST, 2012) on Jaye Bird Productions
- Azureus Rising (OST, 2010) on Westwood Music Group (WEDD-1182)
- Cheshire Adventures (OST, 2009) on Westwood Music Group (WEDD-1179)
- Home - The Horror Story (OST, 2009) on Westwood Music Group (WEDD-1178)
- The Interior (OST, 2008) on Perseverance Records (PRDI-025)
- Wrong Hollywood Number (OST, 2008) on Westwood Music Group (WEDD-1169)

=== Co-composer ===
- Tales Of Halloween (OST, 2015) on Aleph Records (no label number) - 1 track: #10 Limbchoppalooza!

=== Additional music for John Ottman ===
- Non-Stop (OST, 2014) on Varèse Sarabande

=== Arranger/programmer/orchestrator for John Ottman ===
- X-Men: Days of Future Past (OST, 2014) on Sony Classical Records
- The Resident (OST, 2011) on PaleBlue Ltd.
- Unknown (OST, 2011) on Varèse Sarabande
- The Losers (OST, 2010) on PaleBlue Ltd.

=== Arranger/programmer/orchestrator for Stephen Trask ===
- Little Fockers (OST, 2011) on Varèse Sarabande

=== Arranger/programmer/orchestrator for Paul Haslinger ===
- Sleeper Cell: American Terror (OST, 2007) on Lakeshore Records
- Turistas (OST, 2007) on Fox Music

== Works (selections) ==
=== Film ===
- Jurassic Hunt (2021)
- Dragon Soldiers (2020)
- Dead Ant (2017)
- Unnatural (2015)
- I Spit on Your Grave III: Vengeance is Mine (2015)
- The Mark: Redemption (2013)
- Escape (2012)
- The Mark (2012)
- Christmas With A Capital C (2010)
- Broken Angel (2008, U.S. Release: 2011)
- Wrong Hollywood Number (2003)
- Home - The Horror Story (2001)

=== Games ===
- Synced (2023)
- Undawn (2021)
- Age Of Empires: Mobile (2020)
- Call Of Duty: Mobile (2020)
- Torchlight: Infinite (2020)
- Game For Peace a.k.a. PlayerUnknown's Battlegrounds (2019-2021)
- Mafia City (2019)
- Crown Trick (2019)
- Ring Of Elysium (2018-2019)
- Iris.Fall (2018)
- Bladed Fury (2018)
- Honor Of Kings (2018)
- Moonlight Blade (2018)

=== Co-composer ===
- Tales of Halloween (2015) - Segment: Friday the 31st

=== Additional music for John Ottman ===
- Non-Stop. (2014)

=== Arranger/programmer/orchestrator for John Ottman ===
- X-Men: Days of Future Past (2014)
- Unknown (2011)
- The Resident (2011)
- The Losers (2010)

=== Arranger for John Ottman and David Buckley ===
- The Nice Guys (2016)

=== Arranger/programmer for Stephen Trask ===
- So Undercover (2012)
- Little Fockers (2010)

=== Additional music for Paul Haslinger ===
- Fear Factor - Television Series (2005-2006)

=== Arranger/programmer/orchestrator for Paul Haslinger ===
- The Fifth Commandment (2008)
- Gardener of Eden (2007)
- Sleeper Cell: American Terror - Television Series (2006)
- Turistas (2006)
- Into the Blue (2005)

== Collaborators ==
- Mike Ator
- Sandro Friedrich
- Autumn Kramer
- London Metropolitan Orchestra
- City of Prague Philharmonic Orchestra
- Leonardo Tucherman
