= Midnight (1982 film) =

1982 American exploitation horror film by John Russo

- Directed by: John Russo
- Written by: John Russo
- Based on: Midnight; 1980 novel by John A. Russo
- Produced by: Donald Redinger
- Starring: Melanie Verlin; Lawrence Tierney; John Amplas
- Cinematography: Paul McCollough
- Edited by: Paul McCollough
- Music by: Paul McCollough
- Distributed by: Independent International Pictures
- Release date: May 28, 1982
- Running time: 94 minutes
- Country: United States
- Language: English
- Budget: $200,000

Midnight is a 1982 American exploitation horror film directed by John Russo and starring Melanie Verlin, Lawrence Tierney, and John Amplas. Its plot follows a female hitchhiker en route to San Francisco who finds herself at the mercy of a backwoods Satanic cult in Pennsylvania who sacrifice young women in an attempt to resurrect their dead mother. It is based on Russo's 1980 novel of the same name.

The film was shot on location outside Pittsburgh, Pennsylvania, and features special effects by Tom Savini. The film was released theatrically by Independent International Pictures in 1982. While not prosecuted for obscenity, the film was seized and confiscated in the UK under Section 3 of the Obscene Publications Act 1959 during the video nasty panic. The film was re-released in 1985 under the alternate title The Backwoods Massacre. The film was followed by two sequels, Midnight 2: Sex, Death and Videotape (1993) and Midnight 3 (2026).

== Plot ==
In rural Pennsylvania, a young girl screams for help in a rural meadow, her leg caught in an animal trap. A group of children, along with an older woman they call Mama, arrive, and one of the boys, Abraham, knocks the girl unconscious. Later, the children chant a Satanic prayer over the girl at the behest of their mother, and one of the children, Cynthia, proceeds to brutally stab her to death with a dagger.

Years later, teenaged Nancy Johnson runs away from her home after her stepfather Bert, a police officer, attempts to rape her. While hitchhiking to her sister's home in San Francisco, she is picked up by two benevolent young men, Hank and Tom. In the backwoods, they pick up a Baptist preacher and his adult daughter, Sandra, who they drop off at a cemetery to visit the grave of the preacher's wife. Sandra says a prayer and heads back toward their house; her father remains, and is stabbed to death by a man with a machete. Later, Sandra finds her father's corpse on their doorstep, and is also murdered by the man with the machete.

At a local bar, Tom, Hank, and Nancy encounter racists who refuse to serve them because Hank is African-American. Short on money, they steal groceries from a small market and are chased by two local police officers. They lose the police by driving onto a dirt road into the woods. Upon stopping, they witness a man in the woods carrying a large object draped with a sheet. Not wanting to be caught by police, they ultimately decide to camp in the woods overnight.

In the morning, Nancy goes for a walk, and returns to the campsite to witness two police officers, Luke and Abraham, arresting Hank and Tom, accusing them of murdering a local woman. The police shoot Hank and Tom to death execution style, and then pursue Nancy, who flees into the woods. She comes across a farmhouse, and inside finds a teenage girl, Cynthia, playing cards. She asks for a phone, and is directed to another room; when she enters, she finds the man she, Tom, and Hank saw earlier (whom she comes to find is named Cyrus) dismembering two corpses. She is confronted by the two officers, who lock her in an animal cage next to another victim, Gwen. In conversation, Gwen recounts how Luke and Abraham murdered two police officers the night before and stole their uniforms. Luke, Abraham, and Cyrus return to the campsite and burn the bodies of Hank and Tom. Later, Luke goes upstairs and has a conversation with his dead mother, a decomposed corpse the family keeps in a bed.

Meanwhile, Bert reports Nancy missing and begins searching for her himself. At the farmhouse, the family conduct a Black Mass at midnight and sacrifice Sharon, another local woman they have kidnapped, in the name of Satan. Observing the mass from a cage, Nancy prays to God as they slit Sharon's throat before feeding her blood to their dead mother, attempting to resurrect her. Luke and Abraham drive Sharon's body to a field the next morning and begin digging a shallow grave, an event witnessed by Bert, who stumbles upon the scene; he hears them discuss sacrificing Nancy and Gwen on Easter.

At their next Black Mass, Cynthia sacrifices Gwen, while Nancy quietly recites the Lord's Prayer. This time, Luke drinks Gwen's blood himself. After the mass, Luke prepares to bring Gwen's body outside, but is accosted by Bert, who clobbers him. Bert holds Abraham and Cyrus at gunpoint, and forces Abraham to retrieve Nancy. Just as Nancy is brought outside, Cynthia attacks Bert, stabbing him to death. As he collapses, his gun discharges, shooting and killing both Cyrus and Abraham. Nancy flees into a barn and is chased by Cynthia, but Nancy manages to overpower her and slash her throat with a sickle. Nancy proceeds to pour gasoline on Luke, who has regained consciousness, and lights him on fire. Traumatized, she collapses against a shed and watches Luke burn to death.

== Cast ==
- Melanie Verlin as Nancy Johnson
- Lawrence Tierney as Bert Johnson
- John Amplas as Abraham
  - Daniel Costello as Young Abraham
- Greg Besnak as Luke
  - Chris Riblett as Young Luke
- John Hall as Tom
- Charles Jackson as Hank
- Doris Hackney as Harriet Johnson
- Lachele Carl as Sandra Carrington
- Robin Walsh as Cynthia
  - Debra Smith as Young Cynthia
- David Marchick as Cyrus
  - Billy Green as Young Cyrus
- Bob Johnson as Reverend Carrington
- Jackie Nicoll as Mama
- Amy Brinton as Girl in the Trap
- Ellie Wyler as Gwen Davis
- Maura Minteer as Sharon
- Doug Mertz as Billy
- Bud Mellot as Sheriff
- Lucian White as Man in Car
- Dan Kamerer as Gas Station Attendant
- David McCollough as Man at Station

== Production ==
Midnight was filmed on location outside Pittsburgh, Pennsylvania in 1980 on a budget of $70,000 Tom Savini supplied some of the film's special effects/props such as the real life skeleton and the black-faced mother mummy makeup. When Savini left to work on Knightriders (1981), Russo stepped in and finished the remaining special effects shots.

== Release ==
Midnight received a theatrical release through Independent International Pictures, opening regionally in Tallahassee, Florida on May 28, 1982. It continued to screen in various U.S. cities, opening in Nashville, Tennessee on June 11, 1982.

In 1985, the film was re-released under the alternate title The Backwoods Massacre.

=== Critical response ===
Jim Davidson of The Pittsburgh Press wrote: "As horror movies go, this one has two major failings. It's not scary, and it lacks a sense of humor." He added that the film's black mass sequences are "grave and heavy-handed. Russo isn't doing Grand Guignol; he isn't spoofing satanism or catering to an audience that enjoys silliness and artificiality of horror movies."

In 1993, Sight and Sound referred to the film as a "mediocre shocker". Film scholar Scott Aaron Stine called the film an "adeptly made low budget horror film, despite the simple arithmetic involved," and likened it to The Texas Chain Saw Massacre (1974). Tom Writer of Cinefantastique noted: "John Russo, whose solo filmmaking efforts have never come close to equaling his collaborative work with George Romero on NIGHT OF THE LIVING DEAD, deserves praise for this ambitious, low-budget film made in Pittsburgh."

=== Home media ===
The film was released on VHS by Vidmark Entertainment, and sold approximately $1 million worth of video cassettes. In 2005, the film was released on DVD by Lionsgate Home Video, before receiving a region-free DVD release in the United Kingdom by Arrow Films in 2011. It received a Blu-ray release from Severin Films in September 2021.

=== Sequels ===
The film was followed by two sequels. Midnight 2: Sex, Death and Videotape, a shot-on-video film directed by John A. Russo and released by Tempe Entertainment in 1993, centers on Abraham, the sole surviving member of the cult family, who relocates to suburban Pittsburgh and uses a camcorder to document his murders while searching for a mate. Midnight 3, directed by Dustin Ferguson and produced by Russo, was released in 2026 and stars Brinke Stevens.

== Sources ==
- Stine, Scott Aaron (2003). The Gorehound's Guide to Splatter Films of the 1980s. Jefferson, North Carolina: McFarland. ISBN 978-1-476-61132-7.
- Young, R.G. (2000). The Encyclopedia of Fantastic Film: Ali Baba to Zombies. New York City, New York: Hal Leonard Corporation. ISBN 978-1-557-83269-6.
