= Forest of Fear =

Forest of Fear may refer to:

- Forest of Fear (book), book in the Choose Your Own Adventure series
- Toxic Zombies, 1980 film also known as Forest of Fear
