= Perseverance Records =

Perseverance
- Parent company: Perseverance Entertainment Group, Inc. (as of January 1, 2015)
- Founded: 2003
- Founder: Robin Esterhammer
- Distributors: Music Video Distributors (Worldwide); RSK Entertainment (UK)
- Genre: Film scores / Soundtracks
- Country of origin: USA
- Location: Burbank, California
- Official website: perseverancerecords.com

Perseverance Records is a record label which releases film scores on CD and online. Releases are usually accompanied by extensive booklets. Extras, such as audio interviews with composers, are also sometimes included.

== Discography ==
- No Passport Control (PRD 107) by Sharat Chandra Srivastava (digital release only)
- Forsaken Themes From Fantastic Films, Vol. 1: Tears in Rain (PRD 106) by Various Artists
- Shredder (PRD 105D) by Alan Derian (digital release only)
- Flannery (PRD 104D) by Miriam Cutler (digital release only)
- Til Kingdom Come (PRD 103D) by Miriam Cutler (digital release only)
- No Passport Control (PRD 102-1) by Sharat Chandra Srivastava featuring Katja Koren (digital single)
- The Matrix Symphony (PRD 101) by Don Davis
- Amundsen (PRD 100) by Johan Söderqvist
- Solis (PRD 099) by David Stone Hamilton
- Prom Night (PRD 098) by Paul Zaza & Carl Zittrer (first officially licensed soundtrack album, not to be confused with the bootleg)
- The Way You Move Me (PRDI 097) by Stanley Butler
- Awaken (PRD 095) by Brian Ralston & Kays Al-Atrakchi
- Fright Night (PRD 094) by Various Artists
- Bruiser/ Blender (PRD 093D) by Donald Rubinstein (digital release only)
- Castle Freak (PRD 092) by Richard Band
- Rough Magic (PRD 091) by Craig Safan
- Reunion (PRD 090) by The Dennis Dreith Band
- Cinemusica (PRD 089/ LM2010-1) by Mader
- Nemesis (PRD 088) by Michel Rubini
- Standard Delivery (PRD 087/ PRJV 4242) by Eric Ekstrand
- It's About Time (PRD 086/ HMR-9103) by Don Peake
- Knight Rider, Vol. 7 (PRD 085) by Don Peake (Vols 4-7 are USB cards loaded with 2 episodic scores in wav and mp3 format)
- Knight Rider, Vol. 6 (PRD 084) by Don Peake
- Knight Rider, Vol. 5 (PRD 083) by Don Peake
- Knight Rider, Vol. 4 (PRD 082) by Don Peake
- Trophy Heads (PRD 081) by Richard Band
- At Middleton (PRD 080) by Arturo Sandoval
- Eternamente Manzanero (PRD 079) by Arturo Sandoval and Jorge Calandrelli
- Embrace Me (PRD 078) by Antonia Bennett
- The March (PRD 077) by Tandis Jenhudson
- Kickboxer - The 2014 Deluxe Edition (PRD 076) by Paul Hertzog
- Flash Gordon, Volume 3 (PRD 075) by Michael Picton
- Flash Gordon, Volume 2 (PRD 074) by Michael Picton
- Ethel (PRD 073) by Miriam Cutler
- The Pit and the Pendulum (PRD 072) by Richard Band
- Private Dancer (PRD 071) by Brian Ralston
- Dawn Imagined (PRD 070) by Donald Rubinstein (music based on the original 1977 sketches for the planned score to Dawn of the Dead)
- Flash Gordon, Volume 1 (PRD 069) by Michael Picton
- Best of Silent Hill (PRD 068) by Akira Yamaoka
- American Revolutionary: The Evolution of Grace Lee Boggs (PRD 067) by Vivek Maddala
- Thief (PRR 066) by Tangerine Dream and Craig Safan
- Crooked Arrows (PRD 065) by Brian Ralston
- Krush Groove (PRR 064) by various artists
- Lesser Known Favorites (PRP-CS-03) by Craig Safan
- Chitty Chitty Bang Bang (PRR 063) by Richard M. Sherman and Robert B. Sherman (2 CD)
- Creep Van (PRD 062) by Dennis Dreith
- Gregory Crewdson: Brief Encounters (PRD 061) by Dana Kaproff
- Los Angeles, 1937 (PRD 060) by Phillip Lambro (unused score from Chinatown)
- Pennies from Heaven (PRD 059) by various artists
- Escape (PRD 058) by Edwin Wendler
- The Exorcist (PRD 057) by various artists
- Morricone.Uncovered (PRD 056) by Ennio Morricone & Romina Arena
- Music from the Edge (PRD 055) by John Corigliano (unused score from Edge of Darkness)
- Three Amigos! (PRD 054) by Elmer Bernstein & Randy Newman
- Charmed (PRD 053) by J. Peter Robinson (2 CD) (canceled)
- Battle of the Bulge (PRD 052) by Benjamin Frankel
- Capricorn One (PRD 051) by Jerry Goldsmith
- The Witches of Eastwick (PRD 050) by John Williams
- Seeking Justice (PRP-JPR-02) by J. Peter Robinson
- Lilies of the Field (PRR 049) by Jerry Goldsmith
- Wake Wood (PRD 048) by Michael Convertino (canceled)
- Nowhere to Run (PRD 047) by Mark Isham
- The Wedding Banquet (PRD 046) by Mader
- Animals United (PRD 045) by David Newman (US version of Konferenz der Tiere)
- Circus (PRD 044) by Craig Safan (act music from the 141st Ringling Bros. and Barnum & Bailey Circus show)
- The Gauntlet (PRR 043) by Jerry Fielding
- Exorcist II: The Heretic (PRR 042) by Ennio Morricone
- Cinemusica (LM2010-1) by Mader
- Lord of Illusions (2 CDs) (PRD 041) by Simon Boswell
- The Secret Adventures of Jules Verne (2000 TV series) (2 CDs) (PRD 040) by Nick Glennie-Smith
- Slipstream (PRD 039) by Elmer Bernstein
- Death Warrant (PRD 038) by Gary Chang
- Rain Man (PRD 037) by Hans Zimmer
- Jason and the Argonauts (2000 Mini-Series) (PRD 036) by Simon Boswell
- Red Sonja (PRD 035) by Ennio Morricone
- No Retreat, No Surrender (PRD 034) by Frank Harris
- Puppet Master – The Soundtrack Collection Box (5 CDs) (PRD 033) by Richard Band, Jeff Walton, John Massari, and Peter Bernstein; contains music from Puppet Master, Puppet Master II, Puppet Master III, Puppet Master 4, Curse of the Puppet Master, Retro Puppet Master, Puppet Master vs. Demonic Toys, and Puppet Master: Axis of Evil
- Unforgettable (PRD 032) by Christopher Young
- Fade To Black (Promotional CD: PP-CS-01) by Craig Safan
- The Believers (PRD 031) by J. Peter Robinson
- Journey To The End Of The Night (PRD 030) by Elia Cmiral
- The Runestone (PRD 029) by David Newman
- George A. Romero's Knightriders (PRD 028) by Donald Rubinstein
- Hired Guns (PRD 027) by The Sales Bros. (Hunt Sales & Tony Sales) (This is Perseverance's only non-soundtrack release to date.)
- The Deaths Of Ian Stone (PRD 026) by Elia Cmiral
- The Interior (PRDI 025 - Online Exclusive) by Edwin Wendler
- Mutant - Expanded Original Motion Picture Score (PRD 024) by Richard Band
- The Film Music of Jim Manzie, Volume 2 (PRP 023) by Jim Manzie
- The Film Music of Jim Manzie, Volume 1 (PRP 022) by Jim Manzie
- The Film Music of Phillip Lambro (PRD 021) by Phillip Lambro
- Bloodsport (PRD 020) by Paul Hertzog
- Martin / Pollock (Unused Score) (PRD 019) by Donald Rubinstein
- Deadly Friend (PRD-LCSE-018) by Charles Bernstein
- Leatherface: The Texas Chainsaw Massacre III (PRD-LCSE-017) by Jim Manzie
- Kickboxer (PRD 016) by Paul Hertzog
- The Prophecy II (PRD 015) by David C. Williams
- Murph The Surf (PRD 014) by Phillip Lambro
- The Prophecy (PRD 013) by David C. Williams
- Dark Skies (PRD 012) by Michael Hoenig and Mark Snow
- Gag (PRD 011) by Dennis Dreith
- Remo Williams: The Adventure Begins (PRD 010) by Craig Safan
- Crypt Of The Living Dead (PRD 009) by Phillip Lambro
- The Least Worst of Michael Perilstein (PRD 008) by Michael Perilstein
- Loch Ness (PRD 007) by Trevor Jones
- The Punisher (Stereo: PRD 006, 5.1 SACD: TARAN001) by Dennis Dreith
- The Deadly Spawn - Expanded Deadly Deluxe Edition (PRD 005) by Michael Perilstein
- The Abominable Dr. Phibes (PRD 004) by Basil Kirchin
- Invasion Of The Body Snatchers - 25th Anniversary Edition (PRD 003) by Denny Zeitlin
- Dr. Phibes Rises Again - 30th Anniversary Edition (PRD 002) by John Gale
- Prince Valiant (PRP 001) by David Bergeaud
