= Chris Romero =

Chris Romero may refer to:

- Chris Youngblood, American wrestler born Christopher Romero
- Christine Forrest, American actress sometimes credited as Chris Romero
