= John Amplas =

American actor (born 1949)

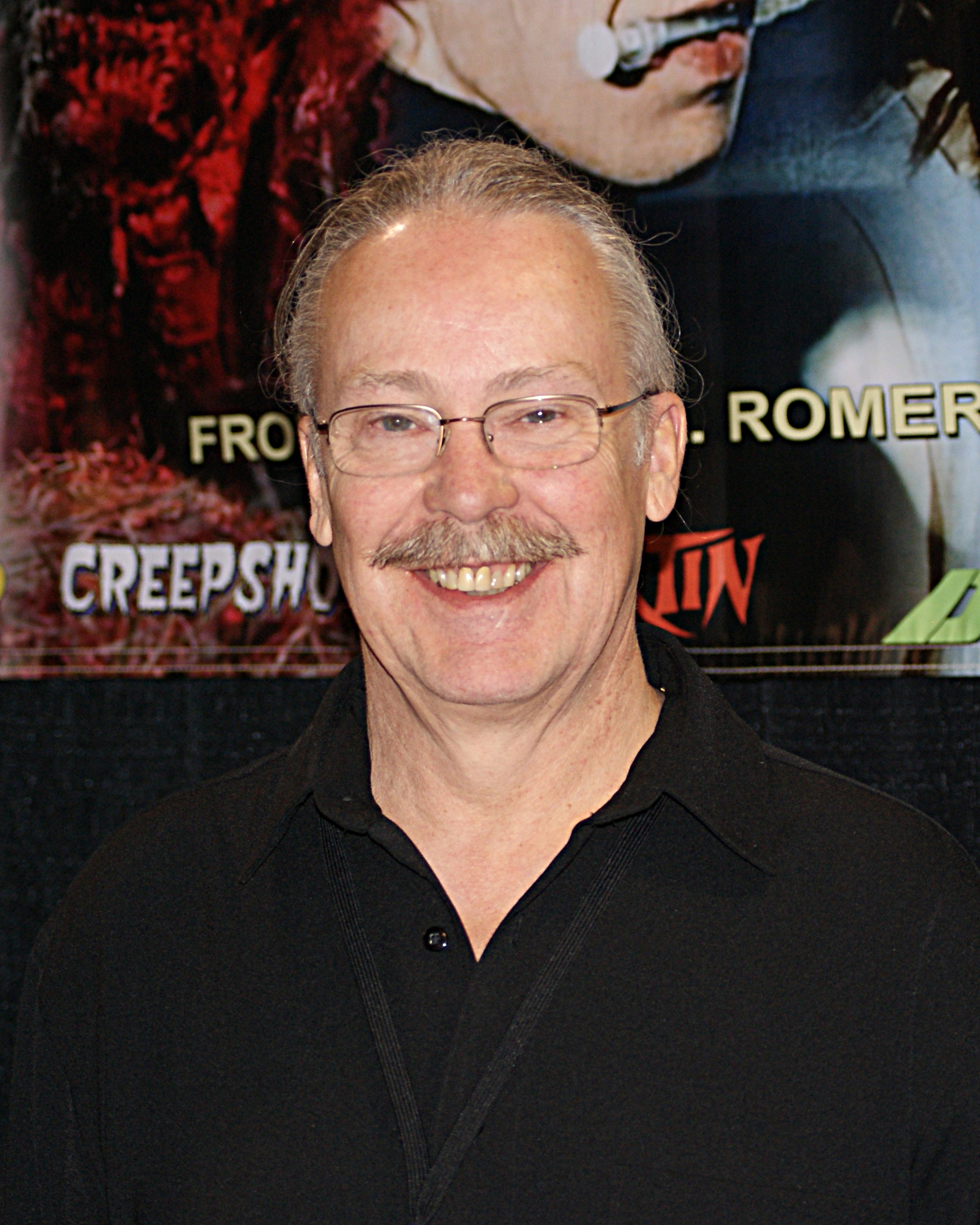
- Amplas, 2011
- Born: June 23, 1949 (age 77); Pittsburgh, Pennsylvania, U.S.
- Occupation: Actor
- Years active: 1970s–present

John Amplas (born June 23, 1949) is an American actor known primarily for his work with director George A. Romero, particularly his appearances in the title role of Martin (1977), as well as Dawn of the Dead (1978) and Creepshow (1982).

== Biography ==
Amplas's first film with George A. Romero was the cult film Martin (1977), in which he played the title role of a man who believes himself to be a vampire. The character of Martin was initially an older man but after Romero saw Amplas in a Pittsburgh production of Philemon he decided to rewrite the part to suit Amplas and cast him in the role.

Thereafter, he appeared in a number of other films directed by Romero, including Dawn of the Dead (1978), Knightriders (1981), Creepshow (1982), and Day of the Dead (1985), as well as Toxic Zombies (1980), and Midnight (1982), directed by John Russo.

He acted in a horror concept teaser entitled The Three (2011) directed by filmmaker Scott Goldberg which also features co-lead from Day of the Dead Lori Cardille. He starred also in the feature film adaption of the Rob Steigert short film Ombis.

== Filmography ==
Year	Title	Role	Notes	Ref.
1977	Martin	Martin Mathias		
1978	Dawn of the Dead	2nd Man on Roof	Uncredited	
1980	Toxic Zombies	Philips		
1981	Knightriders	Whiteface		
1982	Creepshow	Nathan as zombie		
1982	Midnight	Abraham		
1985	Day of the Dead	Dr. Ted Fisher		
1994	No Pets	Eddie Buford		
2001	A Wedding for Bella	Jimmy		
2002	Daddy Cool	Reverend Alter		
2014	Progression	Master of Ceremonies		
2016	Potent Media's Sugar Skull Girls	Demetrius		
2018	After Hours Trading	Pawnbroker		

== Sources ==
- Allbright, Brian (2012). Regional Horror Films, 1958-1990: A State-by-State Guide with Interviews. McFarland & Company. ISBN 9780786472277.
- Kane, Joe (2010). Night of the Living Dead: Behind the Scenes of the Most Terrifying Zombie Movie Ever. Citadel Press. ISBN 978-0-8065-3331-5.
- Stine, Scott Aaron (2003). The Gorehound's Guide to Splatter Films of the 1980s. Jefferson, North Carolina: McFarland. ISBN 978-1-476-61132-7.
- Williams, Tony (2015). The Cinema of George A. Romero: Knight of the Living Dead (2nd ed.). New York City, New York: Columbia University Press. ISBN 978-0-231-85075-9.
