= Flannery (film) =

- Film poster
- Directed by: Elizabeth Coffman and Mark Bosco
- Produced by: Bob Hercules, Christopher O’Hare and Stefan Sonnenfeld
- Narrated by: Mary Steenburgen
- Music by: Miriam Cutler, Bruce Springsteen and Lucinda Williams
- Distributed by: 20th Century Fox CIS
- Release date: October 2019 (Hot Springs)

Flannery is a 2019 documentary film from Long Distance Productions about American novelist Flannery O'Connor.

The film had its world premiere in October 2019 at the opening night of the Hot Springs Documentary Film Festival, as well as additional screenings at the New Orleans Film Festival and Austin Film Festival. Flannery was broadcast on PBS's American Masters series in March 2021.

== Cast ==
Persons appearing in the film include:

- Mary Steenburgen - Narrator
- Hilton Als - Self
- Sally Fitzgerald - Self
- Michael Fitzgerald - Self
- Robert Giroux - Self
- Mary Gordon - Self
- Mary Karr - Self
- Tommy Lee Jones - Self
- Alice McDermott - Self
- Conan O'Brien - Self
- Alice Walker - Self
- Tobias Wolff - Self

== Production ==
Directed by Elizabeth Coffman and Mark Bosco, Flannery is the first National Endowment for the Humanities feature documentary to explore the life of acclaimed southern U.S. writer Flannery O'Connor.

Coffman is a documentary filmmaker, scholar and professor at Loyola University Chicago. She owns and directs films with Ted Hardin of Long Distance Productions. Bosco is a Jesuit priest, O'Connor scholar and Vice President for Mission and Ministry at Georgetown University.

The score for the film, by award-winning composer Miriam Cutler ("RBG", "Dark Money") includes O'Connor-inspired songs by Bruce Springsteen and Lucinda Williams. With animations, letters, never-before-seen photographs and archival footage, soul-raising music and insights from top American writers, actors and critics, the film illustrates the life of the brilliant and reclusive writer. A soundtrack album was released by Perseverance Records in 2021.

Executive producers include Bob Hercules, Christopher O’Hare and Stefan Sonnenfeld.

== Release ==
Flannery had its world premiere in October 2019 at the Hot Springs Documentary Film Festival.

The film won the first Library of Congress Lavine/Ken Burns Prize for Film. Filmmaker Ken Burns, who chairs his namesake award, said in regard to the film, "Flannery is an extraordinary documentary that allows us to follow the creative process of one of our country’s greatest writers." In October 2019, it was awarded the prize for best Documentary Feature at the Austin Film Festival.

Flannery received generally positive reviews from critics. As of October 2021, 74% of the 22 compiled by Rotten Tomatoes are positive, with an average rating of 6.8/10. The website's critics consensus reads: "Flannery's filmmaking doesn't live up to its subject's classic work, but it remains a reasonably engaging introduction."
