= Donald Rubinstein =

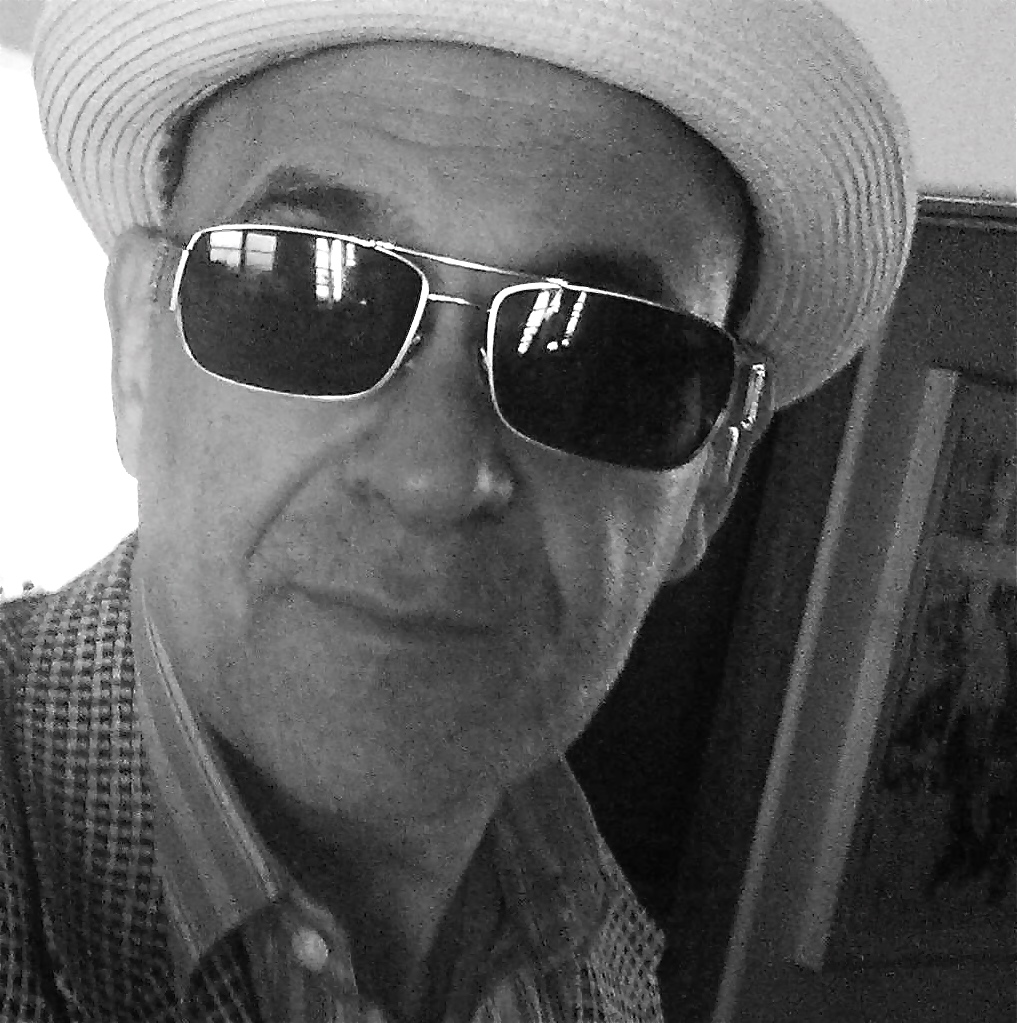
- Composer Donald Rubinstein

Background information
- Born: 1952 (age 73–74)
- Origin: Brooklyn, New York, U.S.
- Genres: Film score, jazz, theater, art
- Occupations: Composer, songwriter, artist
- Instruments: Piano, guitar, vocals
- Years active: 1970s to present
- Labels: Varèse Sarabande, Rhombus Records, Perseverance Records, Levelgreen Records
- Website: donaldrubinstein.com

Donald Rubinstein is a film composer, singer-songwriter, and multimedia artist best known for his collaborations with George A. Romero and for his avant-garde jazz and rock collaborations with musicians such as Bill Frisell, Emil Richards, and Wayne Horvitz.

== Education ==
Inspired to compose by his love of jazz, Rubinstein began studying music at Washington University in St. Louis. He first attended a summer program at age 16, and full-time at 17. He studied political science, and subsequently poetry with Pulitzer Prize-winner Howard Nemerov. After deciding to devote himself entirely to music, Rubinstein learned guitar and piano, transferred to the conservatory, and received a Bachelor of Arts degree in music from Washington University in 1973.

Rubinstein later moved to Boston, where he spent two semesters at the Berklee College of Music. Although he left after finding the experience too constraining for his experimental ideas, he met guitarist Bill Frisell, with whom he would later collaborate on numerous projects. Rubinstein subsequently studied with noted piano instructor Madame Margaret (Stedman) Chaloff, whose other students included Leonard Bernstein, Herbie Hancock, Keith Jarrett, and Chick Corea.

== Film scoring for George A. Romero ==
Donald Rubinstein was 24 when he was first introduced to famed horror filmmaker George A. Romero through his brother Richard P. Rubinstein, who had produced Martin for the writer-director. It was an innovative psychological horror film that equated vampirism with drug addiction and urban decay, and was set in Romero's favored location of Pittsburgh. To match Martin's unique tone, Rubinstein created a Baroque jazz score to play a lonely young man who believes himself to be undead. This was the first time modernistic music had been heard in a "vampire" movie, and Rubinstein's Martin soundtrack would become a highly sought collector's item that Mojo magazine called "One of the top 100 Coolest Soundtracks of All Time."

When Romero next turned Camelot into a motorcycle Renaissance Faire for Knightriders, Donald Rubinstein would compose an equally innovative score, as well as appear in the film as the leader of a musical trio. Rubinstein became close friends with Ed Harris on Knightriders, and would later write an unused score for the actor's directorial debut on Pollock. In 2000, Rubinstein composed the score for Romero's allegorical horror film Bruiser.

Donald Rubinstein's other soundtrack work includes co-writing with Erica Lindsay, the main title for the television series Tales From the Darkside (as well as its film adaptation). Performed by Rubinstein, it was named "The Second Scariest TV Show Intro Of All Time" by Screen Rant (2017). He also wrote the main title and episodic music for the television series Monsters. Rubinstein co-wrote, with Ed Harris, and performed "Ain't Nothin' Like a Friend" for the Harris directed feature soundtrack, Appaloosa. In March 2014 Perseverance Records released Dawn Imagined, which included concert works based on Rubinstein's original sketches for George Romero's Dawn of the Dead. He scored the documentary feature, Tangled Up In Bob: Searching For Bob Dylan and the German Documentary feature Blender, (2015). Perseverance Records then released a composite of selections from that soundtrack, along with selections from Rubinstein's soundtrack for Bruiser in 2016. Rubinstein's score for Martin was released for a fourth time in May 2015 by Ship To Shore Phonograph Company. In 2023 the Martin soundtrack was re-released, yet again, for a fifth time by Second Sight Films. Knightriders also found a new reissue, its third, via a deluxe two LP rendition on Scare Flair Records.

== Recordings ==
As a prolific jazz composer, Rubinstein has partnered with Hank Roberts, Vinny Golia, Bob Moses and Michael Gregory Jackson, among other notable performers, collaborating with them in both recording sessions and live performances. Peter Gordon (Boston Symphony Orchestra) commissioned a work for French Horn and subsequently a jazz trio, including celebrated bassist Anthony Jackson and percussionist Gordon Gottlieb (New York Philharmonic Orchestra). Jazziz Magazine included the duet "Fingers" by Rubinstein and Bill Frisell on their "Celebration of the Modern Era" special edition 20th anniversary CD in 2003.

Also, a critically acclaimed singer/songwriter Donald's work crosses normal boundaries. In 2009 he completed a CD of original songs, "When She Kisses the Ship On His Arm," for Bare Bones Records, which included a vocal-duet with "country outlaw" Terry Allen. Rubinstein has co-written a number of songs with Allen including "Vampires Parade" for his 2010 release "Too Late to Die," which featured long-time Allen collaborator Lloyd Maines. An iconoclast, Rubinstein has released 28 CDs to date, with little major label support. Maintaining an unusual tenacity of position he has produced a unique body of genre-breaking work. 2010 saw the release of three new Rubinstein CDs. Rubinstein released five varied recordings on three different labels from 2011 to 2016. 2020/21 marked the release of three new additions to Rubinstein's discography, via his own Hijo Records Label. They were The Famous Singer, Eternity's Lament, and 36 Year Serenade, The Songs of Donald Rubinstein (Various artists). In 2025 Rubinstein completed two new studio albums, with a third in production, all slated for release in 2026. Of Rubinstein's musical work, Steve Huey of Allmusic wrote, "Singer/songwriter, pianist, jazz experimentalist, soundtrack composer, beat-style poet -- Donald Rubinstein has somehow juggled all those hats over the lengthy span of his creative career."

== Art and theater works ==
Beginning in the late 70s, Rubinstein's theatrical works often included iconic storyteller Brother Blue, with whom he partnered in numerous situations including when they both acted in the movie Knightriders. Ed Harris and the Met Theatre produced "Buddha Baby" and "Premonitions" in Los Angeles. Rubinstein's third multi-media performance work, "Strum Road" also premiered there in 1997, to widespread critical acclaim.

Rubinstein has been exhibited at both The Museum of Modern Art and The Whitney Museum of American Art in New York City, in collaboration with the famed artist Kiki Smith. His single song CD, "Ruby Star," sung in duet with Robin Holcomb, was first sold exclusively at The Museum of Modern Art in 2003. During 2007 The Center for Contemporary Art, Santa Fe, presented a 'thus far' large-scale celebration of Donald's work, including a screening of films he scored, two art exhibits, and a concert performance with special guests John Densmore, Larry Mitchell, Hani Naser and Terry Allen. It also included Rubinstein's directing premiere, "Tales From the Edge," a short animated film based on his drawings. Donald Rubinstein was awarded, via nomination, a fellowship, and residency from the Robert Rauschenberg Foundation in February 2014. His work was subsequently featured in the Boston Print Bicentennial and Fountain Art Fair in NYC. Rubinstein published three books of writings and drawings on his own Hijo Records and Press in 2020, including "The Musician's Book of Miracles", "Joke Book", and "Ancestors."

Donald Rubinstein is currently completing "Sketches of Dreams," a long-standing collaborative work with various artists. He has also completed two new studio albums for release in 2026, "Clouds of the Visionary, I & 2."

== Personal life ==
Rubinstein currently lives with his family in Santa Fe, New Mexico.

== Awards ==
- 1997: ASCAP Special Award in Theater Arts
- 1999: Banff Centre, Leighton Colony, Composer Residency
- 2001: Ucross Foundation, Composer Residency
- 2002: Mojo: Martin Top 100 Soundtracks of all Time.
- 2007: ASCAP Plus Award for Jazz/Popular Composition
- 2009: ASCAP Plus Award for Jazz Composition
- 2010: Fundación Valparaíso, Spain, Composer Residency/Fellowship
- 2014: Rauschenberg Foundation Residency (by nomination)
- 2017: Screen Rant: Tales From the Darkside Scariest TV Show Intros Of All Time, #2.
- 2022: ASCAP Plus Award for Jazz/Popular Composition

== Discography ==
- Martin (LP, Varese Sarabande Records, 1979)
- The Witness (Cassette, Desert Link Records, 1984)
- Tales from the Darkside: The Movie (GNP Crescendo Records, 1991)
- Time Again (Rhombus Records, 1997)
- Scars and Dreams (Blue Horse Records, 1998)
- Martin (Levelgreen Records, CD reissue 1999)
- A Man Without Love (Blue Horse Records, 1999)
- Music For Ocean Travel (Blue Horse Records, 2000)
- Long Parade (Blue Horse Records, 2000)
- Maya (Rhombus Records, 2001)
- Painted Stranger (Rhombus Records, 2001)
- Ruby Star (single song CD, produced for Museum of Modern Art Exhibit with Kiki Smith, 2003)
- A Celebration of the Modern Era (Jazziz, 2003)
- Bruiser (Black Starlight Records, 2004)
- Lost Trail Hymn (Black Starlight Records, 2005)
- Circus Boy (Black Starlight Records, 2006)
- Acceptance (Rhombus Records, 2007)
- Tangled Up In Bob & Other Songs (Rhombus Records, 2007)
- Martin; The Unused Score From Pollock (Perseverance Records, 2007)
- Take the Dark Away (Spacebar Recordings, 2008)
- Knightriders (Perseverance Records, 2008)
- When She Kisses the Ship On His Arm (Bare Bones Records, 2009)
- Too Late to Die (Bare Bones Records, 2010)
- Love Hunger (Bare Bones Records, 2010)
- Life Is Orange (self release MANSTEIN: Jono Manson & Donald Rubinstein, 2010)
- Paper Pieces for Key Board (Bare Bones Records, 2013)
- Dawn Imagined (Perseverance Records, 2014)
- Martin (LP, Ship to Shore Phono, 2015)
- Bruiser/Blender (Perseverance Records, 2016)
- The Famous Singer (Hijo Records, 2020)
- Eternity (Hijo Records, 2020)
- 36 Year Serenade The Songs of Donald Rubinstein, Various Artists (Hijo Records, 2020)
- Demos From the World Storm (Bare Bones Records, 2022)
- Martin (CD, Second Sight Films, 2023)
- Knightriders (Double LP, Scare Flair Records, 2023)
- Clouds of there Visionary Part 1 (Hijo Records, 2026)
