= Antonia Bennett =

American singer (born 1974)

- Born: Antonia Benedetto; April 7, 1974 (age 52); Los Angeles, California, U.S.
- Genres: Jazz, traditional pop, adult alternative
- Occupation: Singer
- Label: Perseverance
- Website: antoniabennett.com

Antonia Bennett (née Benedetto; born April 7, 1974) is an American singer of adult alternative music, standards and jazz. She is the daughter of singer Tony Bennett and actress Sandra Grant.

== Career ==
Bennett trained as an actor at the Lee Strasberg Theatre and Film Institute in Manhattan, New York. She then graduated from the Berklee College of Music in Boston. Beginning in the mid-2000s, she began to appear as an opening act or guest performer at her father's shows. In 2013 she married Ronen Helmann, an Israeli, around the same time she converted to Judaism.

In 2002, The New York Times' Stephen Holden compared Bennett's voice to that of Billie Holiday, Rickie Lee Jones, and Betty Boop. A JazzTimes profile from 2010 said that her voice does not resemble her father's and saying it was like the voice of Jane Monheit and Nellie McKay. Bennett's debut album Embrace Me, a treatment of standards from the Great American Songbook, was released on Perseverance Records in 2014. It followed the release of an EP in 2010 called Natural and a digital-only album in 2012. All three records were produced by songwriter, Holly Knight.

== Discography ==
- Natural (Mesa/Bluemoon, 2010)
- Embrace Me (Perseverance, 2014)
