= Passed Away (film) =

1992 American comedy film

- Theatrical release poster
- Directed by: Charlie Peters
- Written by: Charlie Peters
- Produced by: Larry Brezner; Timothy Marx
- Starring: Bob Hoskins; Blair Brown; Tim Curry; Frances McDormand; William Petersen; Pamela Reed; Peter Riegert; Maureen Stapleton; Nancy Travis; Jack Warden
- Cinematography: Arthur Albert
- Edited by: Harry Keramidas
- Music by: Richard Gibbs
- Production company: Hollywood Pictures
- Distributed by: Buena Vista Pictures Distribution
- Release date: April 24, 1992
- Running time: 96 minutes
- Country: United States
- Language: English
- Box office: $4 million (US)

Passed Away is a 1992 American ensemble comedy film directed and written by Charlie Peters.

== Plot ==
Jack Scanlan is a union leader who returns to work after having a heart attack. His son Frank arranges a welcome back surprise party for Jack, which unfortunately does more than surprise him, as he has another heart attack and dies, because he was actually prone to panic attacks brought on by stress or excitement such as being startled (by things such as people yelling out the word "surprise"), which is apparently what caused his first heart attack. The members of his large, dysfunctional family are brought together and find themselves dealing with all of their emotional baggage.

Everybody's assorted issues are brought to light. The relatives include his children: eldest son Johnny, a tree surgeon who wants more adventure in his life; his brother Frank, a labor leader who wants to live up to his father's expectations; their sister Terry, a dancer; her ex-husband Boyd; an embalmer Peter, who is in love with Terry; and a younger sister Nora, who is a nun based in Latin America.

There are unfamiliar faces too, like a woman named Cassie who turns up at the funeral and may or may not have been their late father's mistress. It is a chance for everyone to get acquainted or reacquainted, and it's all in the family.

== Cast ==
- Bob Hoskins as Johnny Scanlan
- Blair Brown as Amy Scanlan, Johnny's wife
- Tim Curry as Boyd Pinter, Terry's former husband
- Frances McDormand as Nora Scanlan, Johnny's younger sister
- William Petersen as Frank Scanlan, Johnny's younger brother
- Pamela Reed as Terry Scanlan Pinter, Johnny's younger sister
- Peter Riegert as Peter Syracusa, Terry's love interest
- Maureen Stapleton as Mary Scanlan, Johnny's widowed mother
- Nancy Travis as Cassie Slocombe, Jack's friend
- Jack Warden as Jack Scanlan, Johnny's late father
- Teri Polo as Rachel Scanlan, Frank & Denise's daughter
- Deborah Rush as Denise Scanlan, Frank's wife
- Diana Bellamy as BJ, Jack's assistant
- Helen Lloyd Breed as Maureen, Johnny's aunt
- Patrick Breen as Father Hallahan
- Dan Futterman as Tom, Rachel's fiancé
- Anthony Dileo Jr. as Enrique
- Sally Gracie as Mrs. Cassidy
- Louis Mustillo as Carmine Syracusa, Peter's younger brother
- Patricia O'Connell as Mrs. Finch
- Sara Rue as Megan Scanlan, Johnny & Amy's daughter
- Tristan Tait as Sam Scanlan, Johnny & Amy's son
- Don Brockett as Froggie
- Ann Shea as Louise
- Jayce Bartok as Tony Scanlan, Frank & Denise's son
- Dylan Baker as Unsworth
- Jim Corr as Daniel

== Reception ==
The movie received negative reviews. According to the review aggregator Rotten Tomatoes, 18% of 11 critics gave the film a positive review, with an average rating of 4.2/10. Audiences polled by CinemaScore gave the film an average grade of "B−" on an A+ to F scale.

=== Box office ===
The film's first weekend generated $700,000.
