= Tom Gordon =

American baseball player (born 1967)

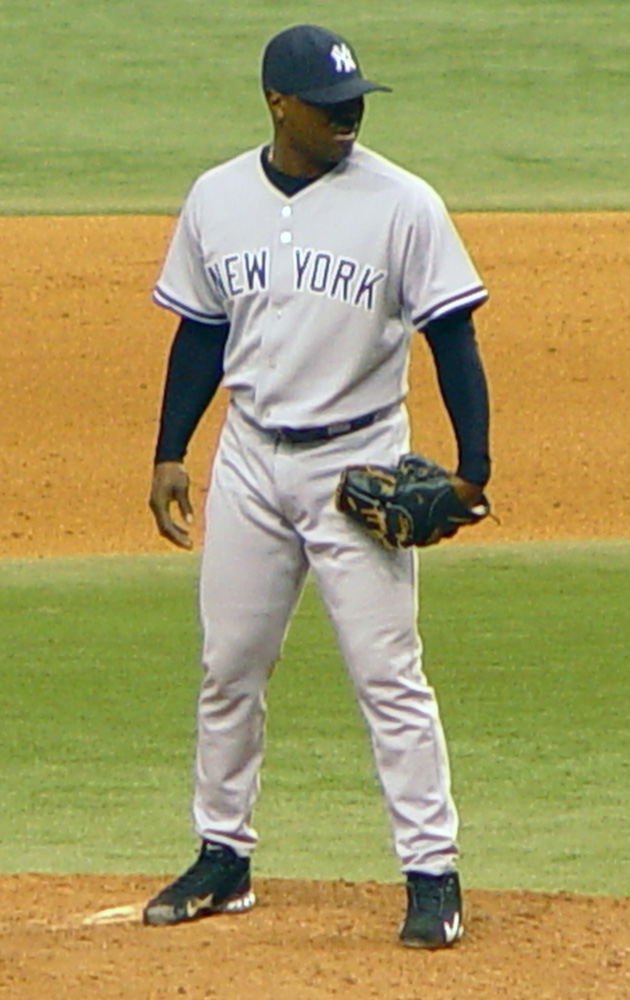
- Gordon with the New York Yankees in 2005
- Pitcher
- Born: November 18, 1967 (age 58); Sebring, Florida, U.S.
- Batted: Right Threw: Right

MLB debut
- September 8, 1988, for the Kansas City Royals

Last MLB appearance
- May 3, 2009, for the Arizona Diamondbacks

MLB statistics
- Win–loss record: 138–126
- Earned run average: 3.96
- Strikeouts: 1,928
- Saves: 158
- Stats at Baseball Reference

Teams
- Kansas City Royals (1988–1995); Boston Red Sox (1996–1999); Chicago Cubs (2001–2002); Houston Astros (2002); Chicago White Sox (2003); New York Yankees (2004–2005); Philadelphia Phillies (2006–2008); Arizona Diamondbacks (2009)

Career highlights and awards
- 3× All-Star (1998, 2004, 2006); AL Rolaids Relief Man Award (1998); AL saves leader (1998)

Thomas Gordon (born November 18, 1967), nicknamed "Flash", is an American former professional baseball right-handed pitcher and current radio color commentator for the Boston Red Sox. Gordon played in Major League Baseball (MLB) for the Kansas City Royals (1988–1995), Boston Red Sox (1996–1999), Chicago Cubs (2001–02), Houston Astros (2002), Chicago White Sox (2003), New York Yankees (2004–05), Philadelphia Phillies (2006–2008), and Arizona Diamondbacks (2009). In 1998, he won the Rolaids Relief Man of the Year Award and led the American League (AL) in saves and games finished. In 1998–99, Gordon set a then-MLB record with 54 consecutive saves.

== Early life ==
Gordon was one of several children born to Annie and Thomas Gordon. He was raised in abject poverty and his parents could not afford a telephone. Gordon attended Avon Park High School in Avon Park, Florida, and was a letterman in baseball. He was selected in the sixth round of the 1986 MLB draft by the Kansas City Royals. He received a $38,000 signing bonus.

== Professional career ==
=== Kansas City Royals (1988–1995) ===
Gordon began his career as a starting pitcher with the Kansas City Royals, first appearing in five games at the age of 20 late in the 1988 season. He became an immediate sensation in Kansas City the following year, posting a 17–9 record and a 3.64 ERA in his first full season, finishing second in the 1989 Rookie of the Year balloting. Gordon also recorded 153 strikeouts that year, the tenth highest total in the American League, which earned him the nickname "Flash."

Gordon continued to post top-10 strikeout totals during the 1990 and 1991 seasons, but his number of wins dropped each year and his ERA crept upwards. Finally, in 1992, Gordon had one of the worst season of his career, posting a 6–10 record and a 4.59 ERA. He bounced back with seasons of 11 to 12 wins from 1993 to 1995, but he never quite regained his rookie form. Prior to the 1996 season, Gordon left Kansas City and signed as a free agent with the Boston Red Sox.

=== Boston Red Sox (1996–1999) ===
In his first season in Boston, Gordon had a 12–9 record and a 5.59 ERA – the highest ERA of his career to that point. Over the next two years, however, the Red Sox converted Gordon from a starting pitcher to a closer and his career reignited. In 1998, Gordon set the club's single-season record for saves (46), with 43 of them in a row, and was named to his first All-Star Team. His success continued in 1999 setting a major league record with his 54th consecutive save in June, but an ongoing elbow injury limited him to just 21 appearances, which required ulnar collateral ligament reconstruction (or UCL) also known as Tommy John surgery, that forced him to spend all of 2000 on the disabled list. His popularity in Boston at this point led New England–based writer and Red Sox fan Stephen King to reference him as the object of infatuation for the young protagonist of the 1999 novel The Girl Who Loved Tom Gordon.

=== Chicago Cubs (2001–2002) ===
The Chicago Cubs, who were in the process of massively overhauling their pitching staff, signed Gordon to a two-year, $5 million contract on December 15, 2000.

=== Houston Astros (2002) ===
On August 22, 2002, the Cubs, who had little interest in retaining Gordon as a closer after obtaining Antonio Alfonseca at the end of spring training, traded him to the Houston Astros in exchange for pitching prospect Russ Rohlicek and two players to be named later, later named as Travis Anderson and Mike Nannini, while the Cubs were playing the Astros. He was blocked from closing on his new team by bullpen staple Billy Wagner, as well as by setup man Octavio Dotel, but Gordon found his position as a middle reliever for Houston. After going 1–3 with a 3.02 ERA in 33 appearances between Chicago and Houston, Gordon's family sent him a bouquet to celebrate that he had closed the season in full health for the first time since 1999.

=== Chicago White Sox (2003) ===
Gordon, a free agent after the 2002 season, signed a one-year, $1.4 million contract with the Chicago White Sox on January 21, 2003. His first win with the team came on April 16, when he pitched the last two innings of a 4–3 comeback win over his former team, the Royals. Gordon and Damaso Marte were the only consistent bullpen presences for the White Sox, and in an attempt to keep the two pitchers healthy for the final stretch of the regular season, manager Jerry Manuel was forced to call up Billy Koch and Jose Paniagua from the minor leagues. That September, Éric Gagné of the Los Angeles Dodgers broke Gordon's consecutive save record with his 55th in a row. Gordon, who was among the best in the AL that year in strikeouts, home runs per nine innings, and wins, was not offended by the feat, telling reporters, "I don't even know whose save record I broke, so I don't have any feelings about that." Gordon went 7–6 with a 3.16 ERA in 66 appearances and 74 innings, during which he converted 12 saves in 17 opportunities, struck out 91 batters, and allowed only 0.5 home runs per nine innings.

=== New York Yankees (2004–2005) ===
After subsequent stops in Houston and both sides of Chicago, Gordon landed in New York. He was an invaluable addition to the Yankees bullpen, serving as a set-up for closer Mariano Rivera, or as a middle reliever in tough situations.

At this point, Gordon had compiled a career 122–111 record with 1733 strikeouts, a 3.99 ERA, 114 saves, and 1,896.2 innings in 671 games (203 as a starter).

=== Philadelphia Phillies (2006–2008) ===
He signed a three-year deal worth $18 million with the Phillies before the 2006 season. Gordon debuted in Philadelphia as a closer during the 2006 season, replacing Billy Wagner, who signed with the Mets after the 2005 season. On May 2, 2007, Gordon was placed on the disabled list due to a rotator cuff inflammation, at which time he was replaced in the closer slot by former starting pitcher Brett Myers. Following both pitchers' return from the DL, Myers retained the closer position, while Gordon was shifted to a late-inning reliever. Flash was named to the 2006 NL All Star Team as the leading vote getter from the players.

Gordon had fully rehabilitated his arm and was prepared for the '08 season.

However, on July 6, 2008, Gordon was placed on the 15-day disabled list for tenderness in his right elbow. Fellow reliever Brad Lidge praised Gordon calling him "a stud" and said that the Phils were hoping for him to return to the team after his 15-day stint. Prior to being placed on the disabled list, Gordon recorded a 13.45 earned run average giving up six runs in four total innings since June 11. He eventually was ruled out for the season, but was able to earn his only World Series ring on the bench in the 2008 World Series.

=== Arizona Diamondbacks (2009) ===
On February 6, 2009, Gordon agreed to a one-year, $500,000 contract with the Arizona Diamondbacks, with additional bonuses up to $2.5 million based on how much time he spent on the active roster. Before agreeing to the deal, Gordon spoke to the Phillies about the opportunity to move west. He began the season on the disabled list to finish his elbow recovery, and on May 3, only a week after being reactivated, Gordon injured his hamstring while trying to tag Rickie Weeks at the plate. He remained prone on the field for several minutes and had to be carried away. He had made only three appearances for the team, going 0–1 in the process. On August 12, the Diamondbacks released Gordon, who had allowed 10 earned runs in one game of a Triple-A rehab assignment in Reno. Gordon was reluctant to retire after his release, saying, "I still feel I can play the game I love ... I still want to pitch in a World Series."

=== Retirement ===
On August 9, 2010, Gordon said that he still thinks he has what it takes to compete, but that he's "fine" with retirement.

He retired as the only pitcher in MLB history to have over 100 wins, over 100 saves, and over 100 holds.

== Career highlights and achievements ==
- Rolaids Relief Man of the Year Award (1998)
- Led AL in saves (1998)
- Led AL in games finished (69, 1998)
- Set an MLB record with 54 consecutive saves (1998–99)
- Led AL in Holds (36) 2004
- Three-time All-Star (1998, 2004, 2006)
- Only pitcher in MLB history with 100 wins, saves, and holds.
- World Series Champion (2008)

== Family ==
Gordon has five children with four different women, none of whom he married. He is the father of Tamasha, Devaris (Dee), Thomas, Thomana, and Nicholas (Nick).

His oldest son, Dee, most recently played for the Washington Nationals. His youngest son, Nick, was drafted fifth overall by the Minnesota Twins in the 2014 Major League Baseball draft and joined the Twins’ major league squad in 2021.

Gordon is the guardian of Cleveland Guardians minor league pitcher Juan Hillman.

One of Gordon's brothers, Anthony Gordon and his cousin Clyde "Pork Chop" Pough, played professional baseball. Anthony was drafted by the Seattle Mariners in the 26th round of the 1987 draft and played 7 minor league seasons. Pough was drafted in the third round by the Cleveland Indians a year later and played seven seasons in MiLB followed by one season in the Mexican League and five in the Atlantic League.

== In popular culture ==
Gordon is mentioned by name in the title, and frequently referred to in the Stephen King novel The Girl Who Loved Tom Gordon.

== See also ==
- List of Major League Baseball annual saves leaders
- List of Major League Baseball career strikeout leaders

Preceded by Billy Wagner	Steve Carlton Most Valuable Pitcher; 2006	Succeeded by Cole Hamels
