= Mark Bosco =

American academic

Mark Bosco, S.J.
- Education: Jesuit School of Theology of Santa Clara University (M.Div.); Graduate Theological Union (Ph.D.)
- Occupations: Professor, university administrator
- Employer: Georgetown University

Mark Bosco, S.J. is a Jesuit priest and a professor. His areas of research and specialization are in the fields of 20th-Century American and British Literature, the Roman Catholic literary tradition, aesthetics, art, and the religious imagination. He is an authority on the works of Flannery O'Connor and Graham Greene.

Bosco is widely published; his most recent book is Graham Greene’s Catholic Imagination, published by Oxford University Press. He has also given numerous invited lectures and talks.

Bosco earned his Ph.D. from Graduate Theological Union in 2003, his M.Div. from the Jesuit School of Theology in 1998.

Prior to August 2017, he was Professor of Theology and English studies at Loyola University Chicago in Chicago, Illinois, as well as the former Interim Director of the Interdisciplinary Honors Program. He was also the Director of Joan and Bill Hank Center for the Catholic Intellectual Heritage. Bosco was the founder and former director of the Catholic Studies Minor Program.

In 2017, Bosco was appointed the Vice President for Mission and Ministry at Georgetown University in Washington, D.C. In addition to leading the campus ministry, he is also a Professorial Lecturer in the Department of English.

Bosco was co-writer and co-director with Elizabeth Coffman of the 2019 documentary film Flannery, about Flannery O'Connor.

== Publications ==
- "Seeing the Glory: Investigations into Graham Greene's The Power and the Glory Through the Lens of Hans Urs von Balthasar's Theological Aesthetics." Logos: A Journal of Catholic Thought and Culture 4: 1 (Winter 2001): 34-53.
- "From The Power and the Glory to The Honorary Consul: The Development of Graham Greene's Catholic Imagination." Religion and Literature 36: 2 (Summer 2004): 51-74.
- "Brutally Real: Why The Passion Appeals to Young People." Commonweal CXXXI: 9 (7 May 2004). Rpt. in The Best Catholic Writing 2005, ed. Brian Doyle. Chicago: Loyola Press, 2005.
- "John L'Heureux: Charting a Post-Vatican II Literary Imagination." Listening: Journal of Religion and Culture 40: 2 (Spring 2005): 78-92.
- "Consenting to Love: Autobiographical Roots of 'Good Country People.'" Southern Review 41: 2 (Spring 2005): 283-295.
- Graham Greene’s Catholic Imagination. Oxford University Press, 2005.
- "John L'Heureux's The Handmaid of Desire: Desiring the Good Academic Imagination." Chapter in Mark Bosco and Kimberly Rae Connor (editors), Academic Novels as Satire: Critical Studies of an Emerging Genre. Edwin Mellen Press, 2007: 131-145.
- "Introduction" to Mark Bosco and David Stagaman (editors), Finding God in All Things: Celebrating Bernard Lonergan, John Courtney Murray and Karl Rahner. Fordham University Press, 2007.
- "Erik Langkjaer: The One Flannery 'Used to Go With'." The Flannery O'Connor Review 5 (2007): 44-55.
- "Introduction" to Graham Greene, The Honorary Consul. Penguin Classics, 2008.
- "The Honorary Consul and Monsignor Quixote: Charting the Post-Vatican II 'Catholic' Novel." Chapter in William Thomas Hill (editor), Lonely Without God: Graham Greene's Quixotic Journey of Faith. Academica Press, LCC, 2008: 209-222.
- "Georges Bernanos and Francis Poulenc: Catholic Convergences in Dialogues of the Carmelites." Logos: A Journal of Catholic Thought and Culture 12: 2 (Spring 2009).
- (with Beatriz Valverde) "Flannery O'Connor: Catholic and Quixotic". Introduction to Mark Bosco and Beatriz Valverde (editors), Reading Flannery O'Connor in Spain: From Andalusia to Andalucía. Editorial Universidad de Jaén, 2020: 7–21.
