= George A. Romero's Resident Evil =

2025 American documentary film

- Official release poster, which replicates the U.S. cover artwork for Resident Evil 2
- Directed by: Brandon Salisbury
- Written by: Robbie McGregor; Brandon Salisbury
- Produced by: Thomas Touhey; Joel Welsh
- Narrated by: Pablo Kuntz
- Cinematography: Tom Robenolt
- Music by: Duane Carlton Merritt
- Production companies: Key 13 Films; Point Five Films; Knights of the Dead; Cyfuno Ventures
- Distributed by: Uncork'd Entertainment
- Release date: January 7, 2025
- Running time: 110 minutes
- Country: United States
- Language: English

George A. Romero's Resident Evil is an American documentary film directed and co-written by Brandon Salisbury. The documentary is about the unrealized film adaptation of the horror video game series Resident Evil, for which filmmaker George A. Romero was considered as a director; in 1998, Romero completed a draft of a screenplay for a Resident Evil film for Constantin Film, but the game series' publisher, Capcom, rejected the script. A film adaptation written and directed by Paul W. S. Anderson and produced by Constantin Film was eventually released in 2002.

George A. Romero's Resident Evil features interviews with figures associated with the unrealized Resident Evil adaptation, as well as archival footage and "unearthed documents" that pertain to the project. The documentary is filmed in a mansion, intended to be reminiscent of the fictional Spencer Mansion that served as the setting for the first Resident Evil game. Pablo Kuntz, the original voice of Albert Wesker in the original game, narrates the documentary.

The documentary was released on digital and on demand on January 7, 2025.

== Background ==
In 1998, the German production company, Constantin Film, hired George A. Romero to write and direct a live action Resident Evil film. The decision made sense as Romero created the modern zombie genre with Night of the Living Dead. Before writing the script, Romero studied the game closely, even having an assistant record gameplay so he could follow the story scene by scene.

The documentary, that is directed by Brandon Salisbury, explores the vision that Romero had for an adaptation of Resident Evil, using new interviews with the people who were involved, and delving into why it was never made.

== Production ==
George A. Romero's Resident Evil was announced in August 2022 at the Creature Feature Weekend, a film festival and fan convention in Gettysburg, Pennsylvania. An official teaser trailer for the documentary was released on March 28, 2023.

== Release ==
George A. Romero's Resident Evil was released on digital and on demand on January 7, 2025.

=== Critical response ===
Tyler Doupe of Dread Central gave a positive review, writing "Though it's not perfect, George A. Romero's Resident Evil is worth a watch. I came away more knowledgeable about the failed adaptation than I was when I went in".
