= Two Evil Eyes =

1990 horror film by George A. Romero and Dario Argento

- Theatrical release poster by Enzo Sciotti
- Directed by: George Romero; Dario Argento
- Screenplay by: George Romero; Dario Argento; Franco Ferrini
- Based on: "The Facts in the Case of M. Valdemar" "The Black Cat" by Edgar Allan Poe
- Produced by: Achille Manzotti
- Starring: Harvey Keitel; Adrienne Barbeau; Ramy Zada; Sally Kirkland; Martin Balsam; E. G. Marshall; John Amos; Kim Hunter; Madeleine Potter
- Cinematography: Peter Reniers; Giuseppe Maccari
- Edited by: Pasquale Buba
- Music by: Pino Donaggio
- Production companies: ADC Films; Gruppo Bema
- Distributed by: Artisti Associati International (Italy); Taurus Entertainment Company (US)
- Release dates: January 25, 1990 (Italy); October 25, 1991 (United States)
- Running time: 120 minutes
- Country: Italy
- Language: English
- Budget: $9 million
- Box office: $349,618

Two Evil Eyes (Italian: Due occhi diabolici) is a 1990 Italian anthology horror film written and directed by George A. Romero and Dario Argento. Two Evil Eyes is split into two separate tales, both based largely on the works of Edgar Allan Poe: "The Facts in the Case of M. Valdemar", directed by Romero and starring Adrienne Barbeau; and "The Black Cat", directed by Argento and starring Harvey Keitel, which blends a number of Poe references into a new narrative. Both of the tales were filmed and take place in contemporary Pittsburgh.

Prior to Two Evil Eyes, Romero and Argento had worked together on Dawn of the Dead (1978).

== Plot ==
=== "The Facts in the Case of Mr. Valdemar" ===
Jessica Valdemar's wealthy husband Ernest, who is 15 years her senior, is dying of a terminal illness. He has contacted his lawyer Steven to liquidate several of his assets into cash, to which Jessica would have access. Steven reluctantly complies but warns Jessica that if anything happens to Ernest before the estate is finalized, she will be investigated by the authorities.

His fears prove to be correct as Jessica has been conspiring with Dr. Robert Hoffman to hypnotize Ernest into doing whatever they wish. When Ernest dies while under hypnosis, the two decide to hide his body in the freezer. The following morning they discover that Ernest's spirit is still with them and that he is trapped in a dark void between the living and the dead, where he is viewed by "Others". He begs Robert to wake him up from his hypnotic state so he can cross over, as the Others want to use him to enter into the living world. Jessica panics and shoots the body. Robert leaves to dig a grave, during which time the Others kill Jessica. He tries to banish the Others by waking Ernest from his hypnosis, however this only results in Ernest fully dying, leaving the Others stranded in their realm. Robert then flees to his apartment where he places himself into a hypnotic sleep. This backfires, as it allows the Others to kill Robert and possess his hypnotized corpse. The story ends with the police responding to reports of a strange smell and discovering Robert, who attacks them while stating that there is nobody to wake him up and that he is trapped forever.

=== "The Black Cat" ===
Rod Usher is a crime scene photographer who is frequently called upon by the police to document local crime scenes, the most recent of which is a woman who was sliced in two by a huge pendulum-like blade. After returning home Rod discovers that his live-in girlfriend Annabel has adopted a black cat, which is immediately hostile towards him. The mutual hatred eventually culminates in Rod photographing himself strangling the cat and displaying the images in his newest photography book, Metropolitan Horrors. Annabel notices the cat's disappearance, causing the couple to argue. She later realizes that Rod killed the cat and plans on leaving him.

Rod unintentionally obtains a similar looking stray black cat from a barmaid while drinking heavily at a local bar. He returns home with the cat and sets about killing it again, but Annabel rescues it. Their argument becomes physical and culminates in Rod killing her with a meat cleaver. He hides her body in a wall and as Annabel taught regular violin lessons from their home, Rod lies to her students about her disappearance. One of the students confides in Rod's neighbor Mr. Pym that he believes Rod to have killed Annabel, something the older man also believes to be true. Rod is later horrified to discover that he accidentally entombed the stray cat with Annabel after the animal forces its way out of the wall. He kills the cat with a saw and disposes of it in a dumpster.

The following day detectives come to the home to question Rod about Annabel's whereabouts. Just as the police are about to leave they hear mewling sounds from the wall, as the cat had given birth while entombed. The body is discovered and Rod is handcuffed, however he manages to overcome and kill both policemen. In an attempt to avoid detection Rod tries to escape from his home by way of a rope tied to a tree but slips and hangs himself. The black cat makes a final appearance, and stares at Rod's final fate.

== Cast ==
=== "The Facts in the Case of Mr. Valdemar" ===
- Adrienne Barbeau as Jessica Valdemar
- Ramy Zada as Dr. Robert Hoffman
- Bingo O'Malley as Ernest Valdemar
- Jeff Howell as Policeman
- E.G. Marshall as Steven Pike
- Chuck Aber as Mr. Pratt
- Tom Atkins as Detective Grogan
- Mitchell Baseman as Boy at Zoo
- Barbara Byrne as Martha
- Larry John Meyers as Old Man
- Christina Romero as Mother at Zoo
- Anthony Dileo Jr. as Taxi Driver
- Christine Forrest as Nurse

=== "The Black Cat" ===
- Cinzentinha as The Cat
- Harvey Keitel as Rod Usher
- Madeleine Potter as Annabel
- John Amos as Detective LeGrand
- Sally Kirkland as Eleonora
- Kim Hunter as Gloria Pym
- Holter Graham as Christian
- Martin Balsam as Mr. Pym
- Jonathan Adams as Hammer
- Julie Benz as Betty
- Lanene Charters as Bonnie
- Bill Dalzell III as Detective
- J. R. Hall as 2nd Policeman
- Scott House as 3rd Policeman
- James G. MacDonald as Luke
- Peggy Sanders as Young Policewoman
- Lou Valenzi as Editor
- Jeffrey Wild as Delivery Man
- Ted Worsley as Desk Editor
- Tom Savini as the Monomaniac

== Production ==
George A. Romero and Dario Argento first worked together on Dawn of the Dead back in 1978 where the collaboration led to the two developing a mutual respect for each other. Shortly after the failure of Romero's Monkey Shines, Argento approached Romero about an anthology project, under the working title of Poe, he and his brother Claudio were working on that would be based on the works of Edgar Allan Poe to which Romero agreed to join wanting to get his mind off the failure of Monkey Shines. Two Evil Eyes was originally intended to be an anthology film consisting of four segments based on Poe stories, each by a different director. John Carpenter, Clive Barker, and Stephen King were considered to direct two of the segments, but Carpenter had scheduling issues, and King was uninterested in serving as a director again after his experience directing the 1986 film Maximum Overdrive. After planning around the schedules of four different directors proved to be too complicated, it was decided to pare the film down to a three part anthology with Argento attempting to convince Wes Craven to sign on to direct the third segment, but once again scheduling and negotiating conflicts saw this approach abandoned and Argento decided his name in combination with Romero's would be enough for a viable film package.

=== Writing ===
For Argento's segment, he chose to adapt "The Black Cat" with frequent collaborator Franco Ferrini. Romero had initially wanted to adapt "The Masque of the Red Death" with Donald Sutherland, who would serve as a link between Argento's and Romero's segments. However, upon learning that Argento didn't want any historical period settings for the segments, Romero rewrote the story to take place in the future, an approach that was met with a negative reaction from Argento, who felt it would invite comparisons to the classic 1964 film version made by Roger Corman. The creative conflict between Argento and Romero was resolved after Corman announced his own remake of Masque of the Red Death, which resulted in Romero opting to instead adapt "The Facts in the Case of M. Valdemar".

=== Filming ===
Two Evil Eyes marked Argento's first time directing a wholly English-language production and was the first time he had needed to employ a dialogue coach.

Romero collaborator Tom Savini provided the special make-up and gore effects for Two Evil Eyes. Savini also appears briefly in "The Black Cat" episode as The Monomaniac, a killer who rips out his victim's teeth.

Two Evil Eyes was Julie Benz's first acting role and the first feature film she starred in. Benz appears as teenage violin student Betty in a few scenes of "The Black Cat" segment. Benz's voice was dubbed in the Italian-language version of the film by Dario Argento's daughter, Asia.

== Reception ==
Two Evil Eyes holds a rating of 63% on Rotten Tomatoes based on 19 reviews, with an average rating of 5.7/10. Metacritic, which uses a weighted average, assigned the film a score of 61 out of 100, based on 4 critics, indicating "generally favorable reviews".

In the book Art of Darkness: The Cinema of Dario Argento, a reviewer wrote of the film that, "Romero was a bizarre choice of director for an adaptation of Poe", and that Romero's segment lacked "any of the director's own trademarks: his striking use of space and editing, the moments of bleak surrealism and dark irony". Though he commended Tom Savini's effects work, Gallant concluded that "the twin halves of Two Evil Eyes make utterly inappropriate bedfellows, coming from two directors whose styles, even at their best, would make an incongruous combination."

== Bibliography ==
- Gallant, Chris, ed. (2003). Art of Darkness: The Cinema of Dario Argento. FAB Press. ISBN 9781903254073.
