= Escape (2012 American film) =

- Directed by: Paul Emami
- Written by: Andrea Gyertson Nasfell
- Produced by: James Chankin; Paul Emami; Chad Hawkins; Michael Scott
- Starring: C. Thomas Howell; John Rhys-Davies; Anora Lyn
- Cinematography: Mark Dadlani
- Edited by: Christopher Holmes
- Music by: Edwin Wendler
- Production companies: Chankin Entertainment; Marker Entertainment; Sixty40 Productions
- Distributed by: Eagle Films; Pure Flix Entertainment
- Release date: 2012
- Running time: 90 minutes
- Country: United States
- Language: English

Escape is a 2012 American mystery thriller film directed by Paul Emami and produced by James Chankin, Chad Hawkins, Michael Scott, and Emami.

== Plot ==
After the unexpected death of their infant, doctors Paul (C. Thomas Howell) and Kim Jordan (Anora Lyn) decide to leave America and travel to Thailand on a medical mission. While they're adapting to their new life, Paul is kidnapped and taken to an isolated island by human traffickers, who need a doctor to save their wounded leader. Kim is left to find her husband on her own, unable to prove the reason for his disappearance. Paul is imprisoned with Englishman Malcolm Andrews (John Rhys-Davies), who is being held for ransom. The two men quickly discover that their philosophies are polar opposites: Andrews is a highly spiritual man, while Paul is a strict atheist. Paul later learns that he cannot save his kidnappers' leader without modern equipment, to which he has no access. Paul and Andrews decide to plan an escape as their last hope for survival.

== Cast ==
- C. Thomas Howell as Paul Jordan
- John Rhys-Davies as Malcolm Andrews
- Anora Lyn as Kim Jordan
- Prinya Intachai as Chakan
- Khanchit Chompoos as The Captain
- Chayut Buanar as Rarong
- Wathana Suksongroh as Lek
- Blaize Andres as Louie
- Celicia Arnold as Michelle
- Sahajak Boonthanakit as Dr. Kiet
- Nophand Chantharasorn as Street Boy
- Tanapol Chuksrida as himself
- Noppawong Khamtonwong as Clerk
- Chanicha Shindejanichakul as herself
- Ken Streutker as Steve
- Somprasong Vejasilp as Old Thai Man

== Release ==
Escape was released on DVD on October 22, 2012.

== Reception ==
The Dove Foundation called it "a tremendous story of redemption".
