= Bruiser (2000 film) =

2000 horror film by George A. Romero

- French theatrical release poster
- Directed by: George A. Romero
- Written by: George A. Romero
- Produced by: Ben Barenholtz; Peter Grunwald
- Starring: Jason Flemyng; Peter Stormare; Leslie Hope; Tom Atkins
- Narrated by: Laurent Basset
- Cinematography: Adam Swica
- Edited by: Miume Jan Eramo
- Music by: Donald Rubinstein
- Production companies: Le Studio Canal+; Barenholtz Productions; Romero-Grunwald Productions
- Distributed by: BAC Films (France); Alliance Atlantis (Canada)
- Release date: 13 February 2000
- Running time: 99 minutes
- Countries: France; Canada
- Languages: English; Spanish
- Budget: $5 million
- Box office: $14,960

Bruiser is a 2000 horror-thriller film written and directed by George A. Romero and starring Jason Flemyng, Peter Stormare and Leslie Hope. Bruiser was filmed in Toronto.

== Plot ==
Henry Creedlow is a creative director for Bruiser, a successful magazine firm, who lives an unhappy life. His high-strung, contemptuous wife Janine is indifferent to him which leads to him having fantasies about suicide. Henry meets with his best friend, Jimmy Larson on their way to work downtown. While trying to board a train, Henry fantasizes about killing a woman who pushes him. In a conference at Bruiser headquarters where everyone is meeting to decide which model should be on the magazine's latest issue, Henry's sleazy and reprehensible boss, Milo Styles, mocks Henry's choice in front of him and his co-workers.

That Saturday, there is a party for the workers at Milo and his wife Rosie's house. Henry has a plaster mold of his face made by Rosie, who designs masks in her spare time. Rosie finishes the mask and adds it to her "garden of lost souls" in the backyard. She asks Henry to paint a design on the featureless mask, but Henry cannot think of anything to draw. Henry sees Milo and Janine across the pool in a very intimate moment.

While driving home later that evening, Henry confronts Janine about what he saw. Janine hardly seems to care and she tells the distraught Henry that he is weak-willed and a pushover. When they arrive home, Henry has another fantasy about killing Janine.

Henry wakes up the next morning, and is shocked when he sees that his entire face has transformed into a white, featureless mask. When Henry tries removing it he cuts himself. Henry hides when Katie, his once-a-week maid, arrives to clean the house. Henry watches the maid as she fills her bag with silver and other items from his house. Henry reveals himself and confronts her about stealing. Henry attacks and beats her to death with the bag filled with stolen silver items.

Henry follows his wife to the office and spots her and Milo having sex. Rosie bursts into the conference room and photographs them. When Milo chases his wife out of the building when Rosie tells Milo that she intends to leave him, Henry sneaks into the conference room where he reveals his new blank face to his wife. He wraps an extension cord around her neck and pushes her out a window, strangling her.

Milo gives a statement to Detective McCleary. Henry eludes the police and goes home. He hides from the cops again when they come to his front door to look for him to deliver the news of his wife's murder, after making it appear that he possibly killed himself.

That afternoon, Henry visits Jimmy and, holding him at gunpoint, reveals the business account papers which show that Jimmy has been pilfering money out of Henry's bank accounts and mutual funds for two years. Jimmy tells Henry that it was Janine's idea to steal Henry's money so she could squander it on herself. Jimmy reveals that Janine has been cheating on Henry with him too. Jimmy suddenly pulls out a gun from his briefcase and tries to kill Henry. Henry fires back, fatally wounding Jimmy in the chest.

Henry calls The Larry Case Show, a popular radio program, and tells the host that he is 'Faceless' and has murdered three people. After listening to some advice from Larry Case, Henry decides that he needs to eradicate all the people from his life who wronged and betrayed him if he is to get his face back.

Henry attends Milo's Halloween costume party, dressed as Zorro wearing a black cape along with his white mask. Rosie is also there and is being tailed by Detective McCleary, who thinks that she either killed Janine or hired someone to kill her. Henry assembles a group of men from the office and lures Milo to a second floor balcony. There Henry tells his mean and ungrateful boss that he has set him up for a "grand finale". Milo is raised overhead on wires and Henry aims a strong laser at Milo, which kills him. As Henry walks away, his face returns to normal. He is spotted by Detective McCleary who moves in to apprehend him. However, Rosie shows up in a Zorro costume with a white mask on and yells at McCleary that she is the killer. Henry bids Rosie farewell and escapes into the crowd.

Some years later, a long-haired Henry is now working as an office messenger in another city. Henry passes by an office where an angry and loathsome executive is yelling at several people. After the man screams at Henry, he turns around... and his blank, anonymous, faceless white mask has returned.

== Cast ==
- Jason Flemyng as Henry Creedlow
- Peter Stormare as Milo Styles
- Leslie Hope as Rosie Newley
- Nina Garbiras as Janine Creedlow
- Andrew Tarbet as Jimmy Larson
- Tom Atkins as Det. McCleary
- Jonathan Higgins as Det. Rakowski
- Jeff Monahan as Tom Burtram
- Marie Cruz as Number 9
- Beatriz Pizano as Katie Saldano
- Tamsin Kelsey as Mariah Breed
- Kelly King as Gloria Kite
- The Misfits
  - Dr. Chud
  - Michale Graves
  - Jerry Only
  - Doyle Wolfgang von Frankenstein

== Soundtrack ==
The score was composed by Donald Rubinstein and the soundtrack features the horror punk band The Misfits.

== Release ==
The film premiered on 13 February 2000 in Canada and was directly released to DVD in the United States on 9 October 2001.

== Reception ==
=== Box office ===
Bruiser has grossed $14,960 in France.

=== Critical response ===
On the review aggregator website Rotten Tomatoes, 70% of 10 critics' reviews are positive, with an average rating of 6/10.
