= Mafia City =

2018 video game

- Developer: Phantix Games
- Publisher: Phantix Games
- Platforms: Android, iOS, Microsoft Windows
- Release: March 30, 2017
- Genre: Strategy

Mafia City is a mobile game from developer Phantix Games. The gameplay involves constructing and levelling up buildings, while battling other players in a PVP environment. Since the game's introduction there have been cross-over events with other properties such as Yakuza, Black Lagoon and Peaky Blinders.

== Gameplay ==
Mafia City: War of Underworld is a strategy game centered on the role of a gang leader.

Players establish businesses such as casinos and pawnshops, gather resources, recruit and train members, and develop their reputation and base. The gameplay primarily involves building and upgrading territory, with additional elements of engaging in conflicts with rival gangs.

The game also incorporates aspects of clan politics, interactions with other gangs, smuggling operations, and investment management. Additionally, players navigate personal relationships within the game's narrative.

== Reception ==
Upon its release, Mafia City spawned multiple advertisements and received a mixed reception from critics. While praised for its polished visuals and mafia-themed strategy gameplay, the game faced criticism for its pay-to-win mechanics. According to Blue Moon Game, the title offers "great visuals and overall polish," but its monetization model, particularly the reliance on microtransactions, dampened the overall experience.

=== Advertising and availability ===
In August 2018 an advert for the game in which players were given the option to either "torture" or "finish" a female hostage was removed from Facebook and YouTube. The adverts are not representative of the gameplay.

The app was banned in India (along with other Chinese apps) on 2 September 2020 by the government, the move came amid the 2020 China-India skirmish.
