= Christine Forrest =

American actress and producer

- Occupations: Actress; producer
- Spouse: George A. Romero (m. 1981; div. 2010)
- Children: 2

Christine Forrest (sometimes credited as Chris Romero) is an American actress and producer. She is the former wife of George A. Romero and appeared in many of his films.

Forrest met Romero on the set of Season of the Witch. She went on to appear in Martin (in a role specifically written for her by Romero), Knightriders (released the same year she and Romero wed), Monkey Shines, Two Evil Eyes and The Dark Half (which she also co-produced). In addition to appearing in a small role in the film, she was a producer and assistant director on Dawn of the Dead.

In 2019, it was announced that Forrest along with Ryan Silbert of Origin Story and It producer Roy Lee would team to produce a film adaptation of Stephen King's The Girl Who Loved Tom Gordon.
