= Toxic Zombies =

- Theatrical release poster
- Directed by: Charles McCrann
- Written by: Charles McCrann
- Produced by: Charles McCrann
- Starring: Charles McCrann; Beverly Shapiro; Dennis Helfend; John Amplas
- Cinematography: David Sperling
- Edited by: Charles McCrann; David Sperling
- Music by: Ted Shapiro
- Production company: CM Productions
- Distributed by: Parker National Distributing
- Release date: May 20, 1980; (France)
- Running time: 89 minutes
- Country: United States
- Language: English

Toxic Zombies (also known as Bloodeaters, Bloodeaters: Butchers of the Damned, The Dromax Derangement, and Forest of Fear) is a 1980 horror film directed by Charles McCrann, who also acted in the film. It was classified as a video nasty in the United Kingdom in the 1980s.

== Plot ==
Illegal drug plantations are sprayed with the chemical Dromax by passing aeroplanes in an anti-drug initiative organised by corrupt government officials. Instead of killing the plants, the hippie growers of the crop are turned into flesh-eating zombie-like creatures.

== Cast ==
- Charles McCrann (credited as Charles Austin) - Tom Cole
- Beverly Shapiro - Polly Cole
- Dennis Helfend - Hermit
- John Amplas - Phillips

== Production ==
The film was produced in the late 1970s while McCrann, who was a graduate of Princeton University and Yale Law School and senior vice president at Marsh & McLennan, was on hiatus. McCrann, a lawyer who had taken evening film classes at New York University while working for a New York State assemblyman, wrote, produced, directed and co-edited the film, and played the lead role under the name Charles Austin, a combination of his first and middle names. Principal photography took place in Pennsylvania in 1979 under the working title Forest of Fear; other working titles included Blood Eaters and Blood Butchers. The film was shot on 16 mm film and released in a 35 mm blow-up. It was filmed on the farm of John and Mary Triboletti in Mills, PA.

== Release and controversy ==
Under the title Forest of Fear, the film received an R rating from the Motion Picture Association of America in March 1980, and Variety reviewed it that October. It opened in Los Angeles as Bloodeaters on January 9, 1981. The film was given a limited release theatrically in the United States by Parker National Distributing. It was also shown twice on the USA Network.

In the United Kingdom, Toxic Zombies was one of the films labelled a video nasty and banned in the 1980s.

In 2021, Massacre Video released the film on Blu-ray as Toxic Zombies in a limited edition of 1,000 copies, with a 4K restoration from multiple 35 mm prints. The disc includes a cut version and a longer uncut version that uses standard-definition inserts, along with interviews with cinematographer David Sperling and actor Claude Scales.

== Reception ==
According to McCrann's wife Michelle, the film "epitomized (his) sense of humor".

Leonard Maltin rated the film as a "bomb", and it was also panned in Cinefantastique. Writing in The Zombie Film Encyclopedia, academic Peter Dendle said, "Despite inconsistent behavior patterns and embarrassing acting, Toxic Zombies has the dubious honor of inaugurating the entire 'redneck zombie' subgenre that would thrive inexplicably in the '80s."

Richard Scheib of Moria gave the film one star, calling it "one of the dreariest of the early 80s spate of zombie films" and faulting its dull pacing and indifferently staged zombie attacks, while noting the influence of George A. Romero, including the casting of Romero collaborator John Amplas. Carl Fisher of Grave Noise scored it 1 out of 10, calling it "mind-numbingly boring" and criticizing the zombies' behavior and the music. Bobby Lisse of Morbidly Beautiful was more positive, giving it three out of five; he called it "rough around every edge" but "really enjoyable", and credited it with a more thorough explanation of how its zombies are created than earlier zombie films.

McCrann would later work for Marsh & McLennan and was killed in their World Trade Center offices during the September 11 attacks.
