= The Girl Who Loved Tom Gordon =

Novel by Stephen King

- First edition cover
- Author: Stephen King
- Cover artist: Shasti O'Leary
- Language: English
- Genre: Horror
- Publisher: Scribner
- Publication date: April 6, 1999
- Publication place: United States
- Media type: Print (Hardcover)
- Pages: 224
- ISBN: 978-0-684-86762-5

The Girl Who Loved Tom Gordon is a 1999 psychological horror novel by American writer Stephen King. In 2004, a pop-up book adaptation was released with design by Kees Moerbeek and illustration by Alan Dingman. A film adaptation to be produced by Chris Romero was announced in 2019.

== Plot summary ==
During a family hiking trip, nine-year-old Trisha's mother and brother Pete constantly squabble about the mother's divorce from their father as well as other topics. Falling back to avoid listening to their argument then wandering off the trail for a bathroom break, Trisha is unable to find her family.

Trying to catch up by taking a shortcut, Trisha slips and falls down a steep embankment and ends up hopelessly lost, heading deeper into the heart of the forest. She is left with a bottle of water, two Twinkies, a boiled egg, celery sticks, a tuna sandwich, a bottle of Surge, a poncho, a Game Boy, and a Walkman. She listens to her Walkman to keep her mood up, either to learn of news of the search for her, or to listen to the baseball game featuring her favorite player Tom Gordon.

As Trisha starts attempting to stretch her meager supplies by consuming edible flora, her family return to their car and call the police. The rescuers search in the area around the path, but not as far as Trisha has gone. The girl decides to follow a creek because of what she read in Little House on the Prairie (though it soon turns into a swamp-like river), rationalizing that all bodies of water lead eventually to inhabited areas.

As the police stop searching for the night, Trisha huddles up underneath a tree to rest. Eventually, a combination of fear, hunger, and thirst causes her to hallucinate. She imagines several people from her life, as well as her hero, Tom Gordon, appearing to her.

Days pass with Trisha wandering further into the woods. Eventually, she begins to believe that she is headed for a confrontation with the God of the Lost, a wasp-faced evil entity who is hunting her down. Her trial becomes a test of a girl's ability to maintain sanity in the face of seemingly certain death. Wracked with pneumonia and near death, she comes upon a road, but just as she discovers signs of civilization, she is confronted by a bear, which she interprets as the God of the Lost in disguise. Facing down her fear, she realizes it's the bottom of the ninth, and she must close the game. In imitation of Tom Gordon, she takes a pitcher's stance and throws her Walkman like a baseball, hitting the bear in the face, and startling it enough to make it back away. A hunter, who has come upon the confrontation between girl and beast, frightens the animal away and takes Trisha to safety, but Trisha knows that she earned her rescue.

Trisha wakes up in a hospital room. She finds her divorced parents and older brother waiting near her bedside. A nurse tells the girl's family that they must leave so that Trisha can rest because "her numbers are up and we don't want that". Her father is the last to leave. Before he does Trisha asks him to hand her her Red Sox hat (autographed by Tom Gordon) and she points towards the sky, just as Gordon does when he closes a game.

== Film adaptation ==
Although George A. Romero was attached to write and direct a film adaptation, plans for it stalled in October 2005 before his death in 2017.

In August 2019, the project was revived, with Romero's production company still attached. Involved parties with the new production include Chris Romero as producer, It producer Roy Lee, Jon Berg of Vertigo Entertainment and Ryan Silbert of Origin Story. The production company is Sanibel Films, the production company of Chris Romero and her late husband George Romero. As of the announcement on August 21, 2019, a writer or director had yet to be announced. Andrew Childs serves as executive producer. On November 16, 2020, it was announced that Lynne Ramsay had been picked to direct the film. In July 2025, Lionsgate optioned the rights to the film and brought on JT Mollner to write and direct.
