= Martin (1977 film) =

- Theatrical release poster
- Directed by: George A. Romero
- Written by: George A. Romero
- Produced by: Richard Rubinstein
- Starring: John Amplas; Lincoln Maazel; Christine Forrest; Elyane Nadeau; Sara Venable; Tom Savini; Fran Middleton; Roger Caine; George A. Romero
- Cinematography: Michael Gornick
- Edited by: George A. Romero
- Music by: Donald Rubinstein
- Production companies: Laurel Productions; Braddock Associates
- Distributed by: Libra Films
- Release date: September 1977
- Running time: 95 minutes
- Country: United States
- Language: English
- Budget: $250,000

Martin (also known internationally as Wampyr) is a 1977 American horror film written and directed by George A. Romero, starring John Amplas. The film follows a troubled young man who believes himself to be a vampire. Shot in 1976, Martin was Romero's fifth feature film following his previous film, The Crazies (1973).

Romero said that Martin was the favorite of all his films. The film is also the first collaboration between George Romero and special effects artist Tom Savini. While a prosecution for obscenity did not result, the film was seized and confiscated in the UK under Section 3 of the Obscene Publications Act 1959 during the video nasty panic.

== Plot ==
The film opens and follows a young man, Martin, traveling on an overnight train from Indianapolis to Pittsburgh. Martin sedates a woman with a syringe full of narcotics, rapes her, slices her forearm with a razor blade, then drinks her blood, allowing her to slowly bleed to death. The next morning, he is met at the train station by his elderly cousin, Tata Cuda, who escorts him to a second train destined for Braddock, Pennsylvania. Martin claims to be much older than his appearance would suggest. He has romantic monochrome visions of religious icons, vampiric seductions, and torch-carrying mobs, but whether these are memories or fantasies is not specified. Cuda has reluctantly agreed to give Martin room and board alongside his granddaughter, Christina.

Cuda is a Lithuanian Catholic who treats Martin like an Old World vampire, referring to him as "Nosferatu." He tries unsuccessfully to repel Martin with strings of garlic and a crucifix. Martin mocks these attempts. Christina is also highly skeptical and critical of Cuda's beliefs, and thinks Martin should receive psychiatric treatment. Cuda warns that if Martin murders anyone in Braddock, he will stake him through the heart.

Martin seeks advice from a local radio disc jockey, who dubs him "The Count." He rejects many common perceptions about vampires, saying there is no "magic stuff." The DJ's listeners consider Martin to be a hit.

Martin gets a job at Cuda's grocery store delivering groceries to customers. One of his customers, Abby Santini, a depressed housewife, becomes taken with Martin. Martin phones the radio show host to describe his infatuation with Abby and senses that she wants to have sex with him. Martin confides that he has never had sex with a woman who was awake. One day, unbeknownst to his family, Martin goes to Pittsburgh and targets a woman he sees at a grocery store. Believing her to be alone while her husband is away on business, he breaks into her house but finds her in bed with a lover. After a series of struggles, Martin kills and feeds on the man instead of the woman, then drugs and rapes the woman before leaving the scene.

After Sunday church, Cuda brings home Father Howard, asking about the possibility of exorcism and demon possession. Father Howard calls Father Zulemas at Cuda's request. Together, Cuda and Zulemas confront Martin and attempt to perform an exorcism on him. At this point, Martin has a vision of people trying to exorcise him, then fleeing. Martin then escapes from Cuda and Zuelmas himself. Later that night, Martin terrorizes Cuda in a playground, donning a cape and false fangs. When Cuda attempts to strike him with his walking cane, Martin removes his teeth and makeup, stating, "It's just a costume... It's only a costume," then drifts away into the night.

Christina, becoming increasingly frustrated by her disagreements with Cuda, ultimately moves out of his house to live with her boyfriend Arthur and bids Martin goodbye. Later, Martin has sexual intercourse with Abby and they begin an affair which lessens his appetite for blood. Worried about experiencing withdrawal, Martin attacks a pair of homeless derelicts and narrowly escapes the police. Upon returning to Braddock, he visits Abby only to discover that she has committed suicide by cutting her wrists in a bathtub. Cuda, who has learned of Abby's death, believes Martin to be her killer and fatally stakes him through the heart before burying him in a backyard flower bed.

Radio callers inquire and speculate about "The Count" while Cuda places a small crucifix atop Martin's grave.

== Cast ==
- John Amplas as Martin Mathias
- Lincoln Maazel as Tata Cuda
- Christine Forrest as Christina
- Elayne Nadeau as Abbie Santini
- Tom Savini as Arthur
- Sara Venable as Housewife Victim
- Fran Middleton as Train Victim
- Roger Caine as Lewis (credited as Al Levitsky)
- George A. Romero as Father Howard
- J. Clifford Forrest Jr. as Father Zulemus
- Tony Buba as Drug Dealer Shot by Police
- Pasquale Buba as Drug Dealer Shot By Police
- Clayton McKinnon as Drug Dealer Shot By Police

== Production ==
Romero wrote the script for Martin based on literary monsters and their orientation in culture; discussing it, he said:

Martin is designed so that all those supernatural monsters that are part of our literary tradition are, in essence, expurgations of ourselves. They are beasts we've created in order to exorcise the monster from within us...I tried to show in Martin that you can't just slice off this evil part of ourselves and throw it away. It's a permanent part of us, and we'd better try and understand it.

The character of Martin was initially an older man and an actual vampire. When Romero saw Amplas in a Pittsburgh production of Philemon, he decided to rewrite the part to suit Amplas and cast him in the role.

The film was shot on a budget of around $250,000. Many of the supporting cast members were friends and family of the filmmakers. It was filmed in the Pittsburgh suburb of Braddock, Pennsylvania, during the summer of 1976. Producer Rubinstein acknowledges that where he indicated a budget of $250,000, the actual budget was only $100,000, but he did not want anyone thinking that they could just commission a film for $100,000, so he inflated the figure to what he estimated would be a reasonable, independent budgeted amount.

The original cut of the film ran approximately 2 hours and 45 minutes. Romero, who shot the film on color film stock, had initially wanted the film to be black-and-white, and disputed with producer Richard Rubinstein over the matter. The final version of the film as it was released is in color, with only Martin's fantasy and dream sequences presented in black-and-white.

== Release ==
=== Theatrical ===
Martin was screened at the Cannes film market in 1977 in hopes of securing a distributor, and later in the year was shown at the Edinburgh Film Festival. Libra Films International purchased distribution rights to the film, initially giving it a limited release in the United States on May 10, 1978 around the Washington, D.C. area.

Similarly to Romero's Dawn of the Dead, Martin was edited for the European market by Dario Argento and released in 1978 under the title of Wampyr. Its score was performed by the band Goblin. Wampyr is only available in an Italian-dubbed version.

=== Home media ===
In the United States, the film received a DVD release by Anchor Bay Entertainment. The film was re-released on DVD on November 9, 2004 by Lionsgate. In the United Kingdom, it was released by Arrow Video in a two-disc DVD set on June 28, 2010. In April 2021, Second Sight Films announced that a 4K restoration of the film was underway. Blu-ray and 4K Ultra HD editions were eventually released in the UK on March 27, 2023.

== Soundtrack ==
The film score by Donald Rubinstein was released on Perseverance Records on November 7, 2007. It was originally released by Varèse Sarabande in 1979.

== Critical reception ==
On review aggregator Rotten Tomatoes, Martin holds an approval rating of 90%, based on 40 reviews, and an average rating of 7.5/10. Its consensus reads, "George A. Romero's contribution to vampire lore contains the expected gore and social satire -- but it's also surprisingly thoughtful, and boasts a whopper of a final act." On Metacritic, the film has a weighted average score of 68 out of 100, based on 9 critics, indicating "generally positive reviews".

A review published by The Austin Chronicle noted: "Martin is relentlessly downbeat and has a molasses pace, but is nonetheless worthwhile to watch if you're in the mood for an uncomfortable, depressing Romero-style take on the vampire legend."

Variety staff wrote: "Pittsburgh-based auteur George A. Romero is still limited by apparently low budgets. But he has inserted some sepia-toned flashback scenes of Martin in Rumania that are extraordinarily evocative, and his direction of the victimization scenes shows a definite flair for suspense." Jonathan Rosenbaum of the Chicago Reader called the film "quasi-comic", and added that it "remains his artiest effort, and in some respects his most accomplished work." Robert Sellers of the Radio Times awarded the film four out of five stars, calling it "a neglected minor masterpiece", and praised the film's intelligent story, atmosphere, and humor. TV Guide gave the film four out of five stars, calling it "a shocking, thoughtful reworking of the vampire myth".

The film was not without its detractors. Judith Martin of The Washington Post criticized the film's depiction of violence as well as the critical assessments regarding the film's underlying themes (such as alienation and satire of the literary vampire), writing: "Martin is pretentious in a way that pornography is when it is dressed up for people who don't want to admit to their taste. We're not really coming for that, it seems to say; that is just there because it is an integral part of the story."

== Legacy ==
American film critic Danny Peary included an essay on Martin in his book Cult Movies 3 (1988).

In the early 2010s, Time Out conducted a poll with several authors, directors, actors and critics who had worked within the horror genre. They were asked to vote for their top horror films. Martin placed at number 87 on their top 100 list.

British synth pop/avant-garde band Soft Cell wrote a 10:16 song entitled "Martin" inspired by this film. Only available as a 12" single bundled with initial copies of their 1983 album, The Art of Falling Apart, it was included as a bonus track when the album was released on CD.

Upon Romero's death, Ben Sachs of The Chicago Reader wrote about the film calling it "perhaps the most emotional in Romero's career." Jez Winship authored a monograph entitled Martin, an analysis on the film published by Electric Dreamhouse.

== Director's cut ==
In October 2021, a 16mm print of the black-and-white director's cut, previously believed to be lost, was located. Approximately 150 minutes in length, this print features different opening and end credits, entirely unique scenes (in comparison to the theatrical cut), extended violence and nudity, alternative edits and voiceovers, as well as a dramaturgically different ending.

In July 2022, the reels were auctioned off to a private bidder for 51,200 USD. However, this print may not be exhibited as the immaterial property rights belong to New Amsterdam Entertainment.

Prior to the auction, The George A. Romero Foundation issued a statement saying that the reels ought to be installed within the George A. Romero Archival Collection at the University of Pittsburgh Library System (ULS) for restoration, preservation, and research purposes.

== See also ==
- Richard Chase
- Vampire films
- List of cult films
- List of films featuring home invasions

== Works cited ==
- Romero, George (2011). Williams, Tony (ed.). George A. Romero: Interviews. University Press of Mississippi. ISBN 978-1-617-03027-7.
