= David Pupkewitz =

David Pupkewitz is the founder and CEO of Focus Films Ltd. (UK). Starting out his career as an independent producer creating broadcast drama and documentaries for Channel 4, in 1995 he moved into Feature Film production with the George Sluizer helmed crime thriller Crimetime. Since then, Focus Films has concentrated solely on the development, financing and production of feature films.

== Future films ==
- Heaven and Earth (2010) (directed by Marleen Gorris)

== Filmography ==
- Master Harold...and the Boys (2010) (directed by Lonny Price)
- Surviving Evil (2008) (directed by Terence Daw and features Billy Zane, Christina Cole and Natalie Mendoza)
- The 4th Kind (2009) (directed by Olatunde Osunsanmi and features Milla Jovovich, and Elias Koteas
- Chemical Wedding (2008) (directed by Julian Doyle and starring Simon Callow, Kal Weber, Jud Charlton and Lucy Cudden)
- Eichmann (2007) (directed by Robert Young (director) and starring Franka Potente, Thomas Kretschmann, Stephen Fry and Troy Garity)
- The Bone Snatcher (2003) (directed by Jason Wulfsohn and starring Scott Bairstow, Rachel Shelley and Warwick Grier)
- The Book of Eve (2002) (directed by Claude Fournier and starring Claire Bloom, Daniel Lavoie and Susannah York)
- The 51st State (2001) (directed by Ronny Yu, the film stars Robert Carlyle, Samuel L. Jackson, Rhys Ifans, Emily Mortimer, Sean Pertwee and Meat Loaf)
- Julie’s Spirit (2000) (directed by Bettina Wilhelm and starring Sylvie Testud and Julia Richter)
- Secret Society (1999) (directed by Imogen Kimmel and starring Lee Ross and Charlotte Brittain)
- Crimetime (1996) (directed by George Sluizer and starring Pete Postlethwaite, Stephen Baldwin and Sadie Frost)
- Diary of a Sane Man (1989) (Independent Film and Video, Channel 4)
- Othello (1987) (critically acclaimed TV drama, directed by Janet Suzman and starring John Kani, Joanna Weinberg, Richard Haddon Haines and Dorothy Ann Gould
- Via Namibia (1985) (documentary with original music by Hugh Masekela)
- Kolmanskop (1982) (feature)
