= McElroy =

McElroy is an Irish surname originating in County Fermanagh, Ireland, where the placename Ballymackilroy is found

McElroy is the surname of a number of people:

== Family of Clint McElroy ==
- Hugh McElroy (1874-1912), Chief Purser aboard the RMS Titanic and great-uncle to Clint
- Clint McElroy (born 1955), American radio personality, comics writer and podcaster
- Griffin McElroy (born 1987), American video games journalist and podcaster; son of Clint
- Justin McElroy (born 1980), American journalist and podcaster; son of Clint
- Sydnee McElroy, American doctor, podcaster; wife of Justin
- Travis McElroy (born 1983), American podcaster; son of Clint
- John McElroy (born 1984) Unknown invisible cousin, personality and creator of the Kingdom of Hearts

== Other notable people with the surname ==
- Alan B. McElroy, American writer
- Albert McElroy (1915–1975), Northern Irish politician
- Alice McElroy Procter (1915–1987), American composer
- Brennan McElroy (born 1992), American basketball player
- Caralee McElroy (born 1983), American multi-instrumentalist
- Chuck McElroy (born 1967), American baseball player
- Codey McElroy (born 1992), American football player
- Colleen J. McElroy (1935–2023), American writer
- Drake McElroy (born 1969), American motorcycle racer
- Edward J. McElroy, labor leader
- George McElroy (1893–1918), Irish World War I Flying Ace
- George McElroy (journalist) (1922–2006), journalist
- Greg McElroy, American former professional football player
- Guy McElroy (1946–1990), Scholar of African-American art
- Ian McElroy, American musician
- Immanuel McElroy (born 1980), American basketball player
- James McElroy (1945–2011), Irish American mobster
- Jane Roma McElroy (1867–1923), American painter
- Jim McElroy (born 1953), American basketball player
- Jim McElroy (baseball) (1862–1889), Major League Baseball player
- John McElroy (Jesuit) (1782–1877), one of two of the Army's first Catholic Chaplains. Founder of St. John's Literary Institute, Boston College High School, and Boston College.
- John McElroy (author) (1846–1929), American soldier, journalist and author
- Joseph McElroy (born 1930), American novelist
- Kathleen McElroy American academic and journalist
- Ken McElroy (1934–1981), American murder victim and criminal
- Leeland McElroy (born 1974), All-American college football player, professional football player, kick returner
- Lillian McElroy (1917–2009), American politician
- Lilly McElroy, American photographer and artist
- Mark McElroy (Ohio politician) (1906–1981), American politician
- Mark McElroy (Arkansas politician), American politician
- Mary Arthur McElroy (1841–1917), sister of U.S. President Chester A. Arthur and acting First Lady
- Michael McElroy (actor), musical theatre actor
- Michael McElroy (scientist), atmosphere scientist
- Neil H. McElroy (1904–1972), American Secretary of Defense
- Reggie McElroy (born 1960), American football player
- Robert McNutt McElroy (1872–1959), professor at Princeton University
- Robert W. McElroy (born 1954), Catholic cardinal and Archbishop of Washington
- Roy McElroy (1907–1994), Mayor of Auckland, New Zealand (1965–1968)
- Sam McElroy (born c. 1963), American football coach
- Theodore Roosevelt McElroy (1901–1963), American telegrapher operator
- Tony McElroy, British spin doctor
- Vann McElroy (born 1960), American football player
- Wendy McElroy, Canadian author
- William D. McElroy (1917–1999), American biochemist
- William S. McEllroy, American tennis player

== Fictional characters ==
- Chef (South Park), whose full name is Jerome McElroy
- Stuart McElroy, fictional character from the BBC drama Holby City.

== See also ==
- Elroy (disambiguation)
- McIlroy
