= Focus Films =

British film production company

Focus Films Ltd.
- Company type: Limited Company
- Industry: Entertainment
- Founded: 1982
- Headquarters: London, United Kingdom
- Key people: David Pupkewitz (founder & CEO); Marsha Levin (founder); Peter Dale (Head of Finance); Malcolm Kohll (Head of Development)
- Products: Motion Pictures
- Website: https://focusfilms.co.uk

Focus Films Ltd. is an independent feature film development and production company in the United Kingdom. It was founded in 1982 by David Pupkewitz and Marsha Levin and is based in Finchley Road, London.

== Background ==
Focus's early successes with television documentaries (Via Namibia) and dramas such as Kolmanskop and Othello, all of which were broadcast by Channel 4, led to its transition to feature film production for the international market starting with Crimetime directed by George Sluizer in 1995. Further films produced by Focus are Secret Society, Book of Eve, and their biggest budget film to date, The 51st State directed by Ronny Yu. The film stars Robert Carlyle, Samuel L. Jackson.

During the hiatus encountered by the independent British film industry between 2004 and early 2007, Focus re-organised its team and strategy and in 2007 co-produced the Bruce Dickinson–scripted film Chemical Wedding, directed by Monty Python veteran Julian Doyle. The film stars Simon Callow and John Shrapnel. It was released theatrically by Warner Music in the UK and Ireland at the end of May 2008.

== Films ==
- Hyde Park on Hudson (directed by Roger Michell)
- Miss Romance 2009 (directed by Ryan Little)
- Heaven and Earth 2010 (directed by Marleen Gorris featuring Natascha McElhone and Pierce Brosnan)
- Master Harold...and the Boys 2008 (directed by Lonny Price and featuring Ving Rhames and Freddie Highmore)
- Surviving Evil 2008 (directed by Terence Daw and features Billy Zane, Christina Cole and Natalie Mendoza)
- The 4th Kind 2008 (directed by Olatunde Osunsanmi and features Milla Jovovich and Elias Koteas
- Chemical Wedding 2007 (directed by Julian Doyle and starring Simon Callow, Kal Webber, Jud Charlton and Lucy Cudden)
- The Bone Snatcher 2003 (directed by Jason Wulfsohn and starring Scott Bairstow, Rachel Shelley and Warwick Grier)
- The Book of Eve 2002 (directed by Claude Fournier and starring Claire Bloom, Daniel Lavoie and Susannah York)
- The 51st State 2001 (directed by Ronny Yu and starring Samuel L. Jackson, Robert Carlyle, Rhys Ifans, Emily Mortimer, Sean Pertwee and Meat Loaf)
- Julies Geist (Julie's Spirit) 2001 (directed by Bettina Wilhelm and starring Sylvie Testud and Julia Richter)
- Secret Society 1999 (directed by Imogen Kimmel and starring Lee Ross and Charlotte Brittain)
- Crimetime 1996 (directed by George Sluizer and starring Pete Postlethwaite, Stephen Baldwin and Sadie Frost)
- Diary of a Sane Man 1989 (Independent Film and Video, Channel 4)
- Othello 1987 (TV drama, directed by Janet Suzman and starring John Kani, Channel 4)
- Via Namibia 1985 (documentary with original music by Hugh Masekela)
- Kolmanskop 1982 (feature)
