= Louise Barnes =

South African actress

- Born: 26 April 1974 (age 52); KwaZulu-Natal, South Africa
- Education: University of the Witwaters
- Occupations: Actress, voice artist
- Years active: 2004–present
- Children: 1

Louise Barnes (born 26 April 1974) is a South African actress. She gained recognition in South Africa for various roles in locally produced films and television series. She is best known for her role in the 2009 South African/UK horror film, Surviving Evil, in which she starred alongside Billy Zane, Christina Cole and Natalie Mendoza.She appeared in the 2024 independent film An Autumn Summer filmed in Michigan and she also played Miranda Barlow in the 2014 American television series Black Sails, produced by Michael Bay and Jonathan E. Steinberg.

== Life and education ==
Barnes was born in KwaZulu-Natal and graduated at the University of the Witwatersrand with an Honours Degree in Dramatic Art. She lives in Johannesburg with her husband and daughter. She once co-owned a health studio after training in the United States as an instructor of Bikram Yoga. She has received critical acclaim for her performance on the series Scandal! for which she won a SAFTA award for Best Actress in a TV Soap.

== Career ==
Barnes has starred in numerous South African produced films and series including Egoli, 7de Laan, Binnelanders, Scandal!, Sorted, Suburban Bliss, S.O.S. and the South African/Canadian co-production Jozi-H. She appears in the 2014 American television series Black Sails, for which she has received critical acclaim for her performance. Entertainment Weekly called her character "intriguing" and "mysterious". She reprised her role in the second season which filmed in Cape Town, South Africa and aired in 2015.

== Filmography ==
=== Film ===
Year	Title	Role	Notes
1993	Where Angels Trend	-	
2002	Borderline	Karen Kendler	
2003	Hoodlun & Son	Celia	
2004	Critical Assignment	Laura	
2009	Surviving Evil	Rachel Rice	

=== Television ===
Year	Title	Role	Notes
1996	Suburban Bliss		
1997–2000	Egoli	Adele de Bruyn de Koning	
2006–2007	Jozi-H	Jocelyn Del Rossi	
2011	The Sinking of the Laconia	Mary Bates	
2009–2013	Scandal!	Donna Hardy	SAFTA Winner—Best Actress in a TV Soap
2014–2016	Black Sails	Miranda Barlow	
2017	Outsiders	Moregon	
2019	NCIS	Sarah/Sahar	
2022	NCIS: Hawaiʻi	Kaya	
2022	Gaslit	Dorothy Hunt	Episode 1x03 "King George"
2022	9-1-1	Rehab Receptionist	Episode 6x09 "Red Flag"

=== Video games ===
Year	Title	Role	Notes
2022	The Callisto Protocol	Dr. Caitlyn Mahler	Voice only

== Theatre ==
- Life x 3 – Sonja. By Alan Swerdlow at Theatre on the Square.
- Fanie's Angel – Tish. By Sylvaine Strike at KKNK.
- Kindertranspor – Faith. By Barbara Rubin at Market Theatre.
- Beautiful Bodies – Clair. By Mark Graham at Wits Amphitheatre.
- Heresy – Frances. By Anthony Ackerman at Wits Amphitheatre.
- Isabella – Melisa. Directed by Lucy Voss-Price at Wits Amphitheatre.
