= The 51st State =

2001 film by Ronny Yu

- Theatrical release poster
- Directed by: Ronny Yu
- Written by: Stel Pavlou
- Produced by: David Pupkewitz; Malcolm Kohll; Andras Hamori; Mark Aldridge
- Starring: Samuel L. Jackson; Robert Carlyle; Emily Mortimer; Sean Pertwee; Ricky Tomlinson; Rhys Ifans; Meat Loaf
- Cinematography: Poon Hang-sang
- Edited by: David Wu
- Music by: Headrillaz; Casper Kedros; Darius Kedros
- Production companies: Film Council; The Film Consortium; Fifty First Films; Focus Films
- Distributed by: Momentum Pictures (United Kingdom); Alliance Atlantis Releasing (Canada)
- Release date: 7 December 2001
- Running time: 92 minutes
- Countries: United Kingdom; Canada
- Budget: $27 million
- Box office: $14.4 million

The 51st State (also known as Formula 51 outside the UK) is a 2001 action comedy film directed by Ronny Yu, written by Stel Pavlou, and starring Samuel L. Jackson, Robert Carlyle, Emily Mortimer, Ricky Tomlinson, Sean Pertwee, Rhys Ifans, Stephen Walters and Meat Loaf. The film follows the story of an American master chemist (Jackson) who heads to Britain to sell his formula for a powerful new drug. All does not go as planned and the chemist soon becomes entangled in a web of deceit.

The film premiered in the United Kingdom on 7 December 2001. It was released internationally under the title Formula 51 in October 2002, where it grossed $14.4 million, against a budget of $27 million.

== Plot ==
In 1971, a policeman pulls over Elmo McElroy, a recent college graduate with a degree, for driving under the influence of marijuana. Due to his arrest and conviction, McElroy cannot find work as a pharmacologist. In the present day, drug lord "the Lizard" calls a meeting of his colleagues, hoping to sell a new substance invented by Elmo. During the meeting, in a bid to escape from the Lizard's manipulation, Elmo blows up the building, killing everyone but the Lizard. Enraged, the Lizard contacts contract killer Dakota, who previously killed the only witness in a case against the Lizard. Dakota reluctantly accepts when the Lizard offers to clear her gambling debts and give her a $250,000 bonus.

Felix DeSouza, a local "fixer" in Liverpool, has been sent by Leopold Durant, head of a local criminal organization, to collect Elmo from Manchester airport, in exchange for two tickets to a sold-out football match between Liverpool and Manchester United. En route to the airport, Felix enters a pub full of Manchester United supporters and antagonizes them before letting off a rocket flare inside; the United fans give chase but his friends rescue him in their car.

Elmo lands in Manchester, is greeted by Felix and is taken to the meeting with Durant. At the meeting, Elmo pitches POS 51, a synthetic drug that can be produced with minimal facilities and is 51 times as potent as other drugs. A second opinion from Pudsey, Durant's chemist, confirms Elmo's claims, and Durant gives him over a million dollars in bonds. Since it is $18 million short of the agreed payment, Elmo refuses to sell.

On a roof across the street, Dakota is about to shoot Elmo in the head when the Lizard calls cancelling the hit; not wanting to kill Elmo until he has the formula. Instead of killing Elmo, she is to kill anyone who meets with him. She ends up killing everyone but Durant, Elmo, and Felix, who is shot in the buttocks. As Elmo and Felix leave the hotel, skinheads who want the drug attack them. Elmo protects them with a golf club. Detective Virgil Kane and his partner Arthur arrive on the scene and give chase. They are soon lured into a game of chicken by Elmo, who escapes. Kane and Arthur return to the crime scene and Kane demands 50% of Durant's deal with McElroy. A miscommunication leads to Durant's death.

Felix contacts a gun dealing club owner and drug distributor named Iki, promising him the formula for £20 million. As Elmo and Felix acquire the ingredients necessary for the drug's manufacture, all of which are over-the-counter products, the now-armed skinheads take them hostage. The skinheads claim they have a lab, though it turns out to be a broken-in animal testing facility. Elmo makes two batches of the drug; one blue and one red. Elmo claims that the red pill is the stronger version, and after he takes one, the skinheads try it. While they are partying, waiting for the effect of the drug, Elmo secretly spits out his red pill. He tells Felix it is a powerful laxative; Elmo and Felix leave after throwing rolls of toilet paper at the incapacitated skinheads.

At Iki's rave club, Elmo initiates his deal and delivers the drug to the waiting crowd. Kane and the police interrupt the deal and arrest Felix. After appearing, Dakota reveals that her real name is Dawn and that she and Felix were domestic partners. She abducts Elmo, leaving with him via the roof. Elmo overpowers her, suspending her over the edge of the roof. Having no choice, she strikes a deal with him and they escape Kane. Meanwhile, Kane blackmails Felix during an interrogation and forces himself into the deal with Iki, which Felix sets up for him.

Felix, Elmo and Dawn meet Iki in a private viewing box at the football match at Anfield. This time, the deal is interrupted by the Lizard, who kills Iki and demands the formula to POS 51. The Lizard celebrates with a drink, as Elmo reveals that the drug is a placebo and POS stands for Power of Suggestion. Kane interrupts them as Elmo's cocktail, an explosive ingested by the Lizard, takes effect, killing the Lizard. Kane is knocked unconscious and arrested by Arthur, while the main three exit unscathed. Dawn and Felix settle down together, and Elmo purchases the Scottish Highland castle of the Chief of Clan McElroy, while explains that he has spent the movie wearing a kilt with "the tartan of my slave master", but that Elmo now claims both the Castle and the Tartan as his own.

== Cast ==
- Samuel L. Jackson as Elmo McElroy
- Robert Carlyle as Felix DeSouza (based on local tattooist)
- Emily Mortimer as Dawn "Dakota" Parker
- Meat Loaf as "The Lizard"
- Sean Pertwee as Detective Virgil Kane (based on local ex police and door supervisor)
- Ricky Tomlinson as Leopold "Leo" Durant
- Rhys Ifans as "Iki"
- Paul Barber as Frederick
- Michael Starke as Detective Arthur
- Stephen Walters as "Blowfish" (based on another local tattooist)
- Ade as Omar
- Angus MacInnes as "Pudsey" Smith, the Chemist

== Production ==
=== Development ===
Screenwriter Stel Pavlou came up with the idea for The 51st State in 1994 while studying at university in Liverpool and working in the kitchens of The Brook Cafe at the Quiggins centre, loosely basing some of the characters on his friends. Pavlou described the idea of the film being based on Liverpool's history in the slave trade and transferring it to modern day in the form of the drug trade. Pavlou and his business partner Mark Aldridge showcased their idea at the Cannes Film Festival in France which led to film development company Focus Films offering funding for development. Soon the film caught the eye of Samuel L. Jackson, who eventually came on board as both a producer and star of the film. The DVD commentary reveals that the script was originally written with Laurence Fishburne in mind, sometime before Jackson became a star.

Originally, Pavlou budgeted at around £1 million and intended to direct it himself. Due to difficulty getting funding Pavlou stepped aside and took a co-producer credit while the matter was being resolved. After five years The 51st State was finally budgeted at $28 million, with financing coming from Canada and the UK via Alliance Atlantis and the Film Consortium.

=== Pre-production ===
Actor and film producer Samuel L. Jackson recommended Hong Kong director Ronny Yu to direct the film, with the belief that the film's overall style was suited to that of Yu's previous credits, such as his 1998 film Bride of Chucky. With the roles of Elmo McElroy (Samuel L. Jackson) and Felix DeSouza (Robert Carlyle) both secured, producer Andras Hamori suggested Meat Loaf to play the antagonist. This was approved by director Yu, who called the idea a "truly inspired piece of casting".

=== Filming ===
Almost all of the film was shot on location in Liverpool apart from the opening scene which was shot in Los Angeles, a driving scene which was filmed in Manchester and another scene which was filmed at Cholmondeley Castle in Cheshire. Major locations used in Liverpool included the River Mersey and docks, Pier Head, the India Building, Water Street as well as Liverpool's's stadium Anfield. Other famous Liverpool landmarks can be seen throughout the film in the background such as St George's Hall and the Liver Building.

Production designer Alan Macdonald used the film's production base in Boundary Street to build various sets for interior scenes, as well as a vast disused warehouse space in Blackstock Street.

== Release ==
=== Home media ===
The film was released on both VHS and DVD. The DVD version was released on 7 October 2002. Special features include an audio commentary, making-of and production featurettes, a photo gallery, trailer, and cast and crew interviews. The film was released on a dual Blu-ray and DVD format on October 2, 2017.

== Reception ==
=== Critical reception ===
On review aggregation website Rotten Tomatoes, the film received a 26% based on reviews from 101 critics, with an average rating of 4.3/10, and the consensus reading: "Filled with profanities, Formula 51 is a stylized and incoherent mess that doesn't add up to much." On Metacritic, the film gained a 23 out of 100 based on reviews from 29 critics. Audiences polled by CinemaScore gave the film an average grade of "C-" on an A+ to F scale.

Roger Ebert of the Chicago Sun-Times newspaper called the film "a farce", giving the film one out of four stars, and particularly negative comments on the film's content and script. Generally positive reviews were given by both the BBC and Empire reviewers, with Alan Morrison of the latter calling it "full-on fun" and that the film "goes beyond the boundaries" of British films. IGN also gave the film a generally positive review, concluding that "you get exactly what you pay for" and that the film was overall very "enjoyable".

=== Box office ===
The film had its world premiere on 7 December 2001, in London's West End Curzon Cinema.

In total, the film earned $14.4 million at the worldwide box office, $5.2 million of that in the US and $9.2 million elsewhere.

== Soundtrack ==
The soundtrack was written by Darius Kedros, Caspar Kedros and Barney Quinton under the band name Headrillaz, and also featured artists such as PJ Harvey, Run–D.M.C., Nelly and Stephen Day.
