= William McIlroy =

William McIlroy may refer to:

- William McIlroy (department store), a group of department stores in England
- Bill McIlroy (footballer) (1883–1960), Australian rules footballer
- William McIlroy (secularist) (1928–2013), British secularist and atheist activist
