= Elroy (given name) =

Elroy is an English-language masculine given name. It is a variant of the name Leroy, meaning "The King".

== People ==
- De Elroy Beeler (1915–2007), American aerospace engineer
- Elroy M. Avery (1844–1935), American politician
- Elroy Chester (1969–2013), American serial killer
- Elroy Gelant (born 1986), South African long-distance runner
- Elroy Harris (born 1966), American football running back
- Elroy Hirsch (1923–2004), American Hall-of-Fame football player, sport executive and actor
- Elroy van der Hooft (born 1990), German-born Dutch footballer
- Elroy Josephs (1939–1997), Jamaican dancer
- Elroy Kahanek (1941–2014), American record industry official and songwriter
- Elroy Kromheer (born 1970), Dutch former footballer
- Elroy Maule (1913–1984), American politician
- Elroy McBride (born 1993), Bahamian sprinter
- Elroy Pappot (born 1993), Dutch footballer
- Elroy Powell (born 1973), better known by his stage name Spoonface, British singer, songwriter and producer
- Elroy Schwartz (1923–2013), American comedy and television writer
- Elroy Smith (born 1981), Belizean footballer
- Elroy Turner (born 1951), Antigua and Barbuda sprinter

== Fictional characters ==
- Elroy Jetson, on the American animated TV series The Jetsons

== See also ==
- Elroy (disambiguation)
