= Pupkewitz =

Pupkewitz is a surname. Notable people with the surname include:

- David Pupkewitz, British film producer
- Harold Pupkewitz (1915–2012), Namibian businessman
