= Trouble sleeping (disambiguation) =

Trouble sleeping may refer to:

- Trouble sleeping, also known as insomnia
- "Trouble Sleeping" (song), a song by Corinne Bailey Rae
- Trouble Sleeping (film), a 2015 film
