= McIlroy =

McIlroy is a Scottish/Irish surname.

Notable people and fictional characters with the name include:

== People ==
- Alistair McIlroy, Scottish athlete
- Amy McIlroy (born 1991), New Zealand bowls player
- Bill McIlroy (footballer) (1883–1960), Australian rules footballer
- Brien McIlroy (1939–1995), Scottish footballer
- Charles McIlroy (born 1938), American water polo player
- David McIlroy (born 1968), British diplomat
- Douglas McIlroy (born 1932), mathematician, engineer, and programmer
- Ethan McIlroy (born 2000), Irish rugby union player
- James McIlroy (musician) (born 1977), British musician
- James McIlroy (runner) (born 1976), British middle distance runner
- James McIlroy (surgeon) (1879–1968), British surgeon and polar explorer
- Jamie McIlroy (born 1994), English cricketer
- Jimmy McIlroy (1931–2018), Northern Ireland international footballer
- Joel McIlroy (born 1973), Australian actor
- Kate McIlroy (born 1981), New Zealand triathlete and distance runner
- Louise McIlroy (1874–1968), Irish-born British physician
- Ned McIlroy (born 1939), American water polo player
- Rory McIlroy (born 1989), professional golfer from Northern Ireland
- Sammy McIlroy (born 1954), former Northern Ireland international footballer
- Shannon McIlroy (born 1987), New Zealand lawn bowler
- William McIlroy (secularist) (1928–2013), British secularist and atheist activist, writer and editor

=== Fictional characters ===
- Payne McIlroy, character from American sitcom Designing Women

== See also ==
- McElroy
