= Robert Adetuyi =

Canadian screenwriter and film director

- Born: Sudbury, Ontario, Canada
- Education: York University
- Occupations: Film director; screenwriter
- Relatives: Alfons Adetuyi (brother)

Robert Adetuyi is a Canadian screenwriter and film director who works in Hollywood. Born in Sudbury, Ontario, Adetuyi is a graduate of York University, where he studied communications and sociology. He moved to Hollywood in 1992.

== Career ==
His screenwriting credits include Stomp the Yard, Code Name: The Cleaner, Turn It Up, You Got Served: Beat the World, Honey: Rise Up and Dance and High Chicago. He has directed Turn It Up, You Got Served: Beat the World, Bring It On: Worldwide Cheersmack, Trouble Sleeping and Stand!.

Along with his brothers Tom, Amos and Alfons, Adetuyi is a partner in the film and television production firm Inner City Films, whose productions have included the television series Jozi-H and Ekhaya: A Family Chronicle and the films High Chicago and Love Jacked.
