= Surviving Evil =

- Theatrical poster
- Directed by: Terence Daw
- Written by: Terence Daw
- Produced by: David Pupkewitz; Anton Ernst; Malcolm Kohll
- Starring: Billy Zane; Christina Cole; Natalie Mendoza
- Cinematography: Mike Downie
- Edited by: Adam Recht
- Music by: Colin Baldry; Tom Kane
- Production companies: Anton Ernst Entertainment; Entertainment Motion Pictures (E-MOTION); Motion Investment Group; Focus Films Ltd. (UK)
- Distributed by: Kaleidoscope; Zing Entertainment
- Release date: 10 July 2009
- Running time: 90 minutes
- Countries: United Kingdom; South Africa
- Language: English

Surviving Evil (also known as Evil Island) is a 2009 horror film directed and written by Terence Daw, and produced by David Pupkewitz, Anton Ernst and Malcolm Kohll. It stars Billy Zane, Christina Cole, Natalie Mendoza, Joel Torre and Louise Barnes. The screenplay concerns six documentary filmmakers who attempt to survive their visit to a Philippine island to shoot a survival special when they discover that the shape shifting, bloodthirsty Aswang, a creature of Philippine folklore inhabits the island.

== Plot ==
A team of six documentary filmmakers, Sebastian "Seb" Beazley (Billy Zane), Phoebe Drake (Christina Cole), Cecilia "Chill" Reyes (Natalie Mendoza), Joey "Tito" Valencia (Joel Torre), Rachel Rice (Louise Barnes) and Dexter "Dex" Simms (Colin Moss), arrive to spend six days shooting a wilderness survival special, Surviving the Wilderness, on the remote Mayaman Island, one of the seven thousand islands that make up the Philippine Archipelago. They set up camp, and it’s not long until ominous events begin to happen, eventually sparking their suspicion that the mythical Aswang creature inhabits the island.

The second day, Joey and Cecilia travel alone to the village of the Isarog tribe, where people had been savaged and one woman's corpse remains with her stomach gouged open. Determined to stay for the whole trip, Joey forces Cecilia to keep her silence among the group about the lurking danger. That night, Phoebe overhears one of their conversations and together they discuss the Aswang, detailed as a shape shifting, flesh-eating, jungle tree creature of the Filipino folklore, capable of procreating by altering the fetus of a pregnant woman in an evolutionary process called Dungo nan bunti. The creatures' fears include staying on the ground too long and fire.

The third day, Sebastian is bitten by the Aswang and Phoebe comes across an infant corpse, as Joey and Cecilia follow map directions to a gun tower close to the Aswang’s nest. There, Cecilia finds out Joey is searching for gold to help his family. The gold and the treasure map were left behind decades ago by Joey’s grandfather who was a prisoner of the Japanese army in the Second World War. Joey detonates a hole in the tower floor and goes underground to find and obtain some of the gold. Just then, many Aswang creatures attack Cecilia, who stayed above to take cover for Joey. Cecilia falls out of sight, and when Joey returns to the surface, he is killed by the creatures, to Cecilia's horror.

The group discovers Phoebe is pregnant and the Aswang creatures are after her blood to turn her baby into one of theirs. Cecilia escapes on foot from the creatures, with Dexter eventually finding her after she calls for help. This leads to the whole group coming under attack from the creatures, but they are able to injure some of them. The group attempts to leave the island on an inflatable raft, but the creatures pursue them again and end up killing Dexter. At nightfall, Sebastian and Phoebe go down a ditch in the jungle; however, Sebastian badly injures himself with his machete during the fall. He tells Phoebe to run and tries to fight off the creatures, but they kill him.

By sunrise on the fourth day, Rachel and Cecilia take shelter at the gun tower. Rachel looks for Joey’s satellite phone, and one of the creatures emerges, only for Cecilia to shoot it with Joey’s gun. Rachel uses a rope to go underground, but it snaps from its wooden hinge and she falls, causing her to lose consciousness. Cecilia solely combats the entourage of creatures which fly out of its nest; however, one of them grabs her and brings her there. A handheld explosive she was preparing before she was taken detonates in the nest, killing her, a pregnant woman inside, and the creatures in the explosion. While this goes on, Phoebe escapes the island on the raft. The next day, she winds up on another island where she realizes three pregnant women are soon to give birth to more creatures. Back at the gun tower, the sat phone rings in Joey’s bag. Underground, Rachel shows signs that she is alive.

== Cast ==
- Billy Zane as Sebastian "Seb" Beazley
- Natalie Mendoza as Cecilia "Chill" Reyes
- Joel Torre as Joey "Tito" Valencia
- Colin Moss as Dexter "Dex" Simms
- Christina Cole as Phoebe Drake
- Louise Barnes as Rachel Rice

== Production ==
Production on the film began in March 2008 and concluded in five weeks. It marked the directorial debut of director/writer Terence Daw. The story was set on a small island in the Philippines, though the filmmakers discovered areas in KwaZulu-Natal, South Africa to shoot. Supported by national parks, they were able to film in the 253-hectare Kenneth Stainbank Nature Reserve in Yellowwood Park, Durban, which had the lush tropical vegetation the filmmakers needed and was the ideal double for a Philippine island. Another place used was a beach near Umkomaas, shown in the scene where the crew arrive on the island.

Producer Anton Ernst said, "Our main aim with this film is to take the audience on a roller coaster ride - filled with fun, excitement and suspenseful horror. We are proud that we were able to cast Billy Zane, star of one of the biggest films ever made, with our own stars Colin Moss and Louise Barnes, as well as the fine talents of Christina Cole, Natalie Mendoza and Joel Torre."

== Release ==
The film premiered on 10 July 2009 and was part of the 2009 Shriekfest in Los Angeles. It was released in the UK in Cinemas on 2 October 2009, and on DVD on 5 October 2009.

== Soundtrack ==
The score was composed by Colin Baldry and Tom Kane. The original soundtrack featured songs from Jean-Raphael Dedieu and Natalie Mendoza.

== Reception ==
Andrew Pulver of The Guardian gave the film 2/5 stars, writing, "It's all rather obviously low budget, and takes a l-o-o-ong time to get going, but when it does it's efficient, rather than especially inspired." Corey Danna from HorrorNews.net wrote, "Surviving Evil is ridiculous but it is actually a cut above the rest, but just a little. There was a real effort here by Daw to make the best film he could and mostly succeeds. It seemed that the film was written with a specific budget in mind and was able to deliver on the said budget. He never once tried to over step his bounds and made a safe horror film with plenty of blood, awesome looking creatures, and the most important ingredient, characters that actually have souls. People we are able to root for and people that feel and look human." Dread Central rated the film a score of 2.5 out of 5, commending the creature design as the film's best aspect, as well as the character development. However, the reviewer criticized the film's occasionally shoddy cinematography, and moments of stupidity.
