= High Chicago =

- Film poster
- Directed by: Alfons Adetuyi
- Written by: Robert Adetuyi
- Produced by: Alfons Adetuyi
- Starring: Colin Salmon; Karen LeBlanc; Kevin Hanchard; Sebastian Pigott
- Cinematography: Rhett Morita
- Edited by: Lisa di Michele
- Music by: Frank Fitzpatrick
- Release date: September 2011 (Cinéfest)

High Chicago (also released as A Family Man) is a 2011 drama film. Director Alfons Adetuyi and his brother, screenwriter Robert Adetuyi, used locations in their home town of Sudbury, Ontario when making the film.

The film had its US premier at the 2012 Pan African Film Festival in February 2012. It had its Toronto premier at the 2012 ReelWorld Film Festival in April 2012. In an interview in Shadow and Act magazine Adetuyi revealed that his film about a father with a dream was based on one of his own father's dreams. His father had dreamed of opening a North American style drive-in movie theatre in Africa.

The film was Adetuyi's first feature film, although he and his brothers had run a film production company, Inner City Films, for over a decade. Angelo Muredda praised the film for an absence of the mistakes beginning directors usually make on their debut feature films.

Adetuyi told the Sudbury Star shortly after the release of High Chicago that he planned to return to Sudbury to shoot a second film, as he saw High Chicago as the first in an "African trilogy".

== Plot ==
Colin Salmon stars as Sam, a hard-drinking father of three, ex-Navy man, ex-miner, and soon to be ex-husband. Sam takes to gambling to bankroll his crazy plan to open a drive-in theatre in Africa. Equally desperate to support his family and keep his dream alive, we watch as Sam’s life spirals out of control in a showdown with a deadly Detroit card shark.

== Festivals ==
- Montreal International Black Film Festival, 2012
- Chicago Black Harvest Film Festival, 2012
- Boston Roxbury International Film Festival, 2012
- Canadian Cinema Editors Awards, 2012 - Nomination - "Best Editing - Feature Length Dramatic"
- ReelWorld Film Festival, 2012 - Awards - "Outstanding Canadian Feature" and "Audience Choice Award"
- African Movie Academy Awards (AMAA), 2012 - Nomination - "Best Diaspora Feature"
- Los Angeles Pan African Film Festival, 2012 - Nomination - "Best Director First Feature"
- Cinéfest Sudbury International Film Festival, 2011
