= Danger Zone (1996 film) =

- Directed by: Allan Eastman
- Written by: Jeff Albert
- Produced by: Avi Lerner; Danny Dimbort; Trevor Short
- Starring: Billy Zane; Robert Downey Jr.; Cary-Hiroyuki Tagawa; Ron Silver
- Cinematography: Yossi Wein
- Edited by: Alain Jakubowicz
- Music by: Daniel Pelfrey
- Distributed by: Nu Image Films
- Release date: August 2, 1996
- Running time: 92 minutes
- Countries: United States; Canada; South Africa
- Language: English
- Budget: $8,500,000

Danger Zone is a 1996 American action thriller adventure film directed by Allan Eastman and starring Billy Zane and Robert Downey Jr.

== Plot ==
In the fictional African nation Zambeze, American mining engineer Rick Morgan is conned into an illegal operation involving toxic waste by his old friend, Jim Scott. Immediately after, the mine is attacked by a team of mercenaries, led by a rogue agent called Chang. Scott attempts to flee, but is supposedly killed by Chang. The mercenaries leave right as the army arrives. The government assumes Morgan is responsible for the deaths of hundreds of villagers, apparently caused by toxic waste. Due to the CIA, Morgan is allowed to return to America.

One year later, Morgan is approached by Maurice Dupont for a mission to clear his name and prevent further deaths. Morgan reluctantly agrees upon finding out that Scott is alive. Morgan is introduced to World Health Organization researcher Dr. Kim Woods. The two are teamed up. After searching a mine, Morgan and Kim are captured by rebel forces. Morgan and Kim are almost executed until Scott reveals himself to be their secret leader. Not long after, Chang's mercenaries attack and lay waste to the camp. Scott gives Morgan a code and the last clue he needs to find the barrels. Chang then murders Scott as Morgan and Kim escape.

Back at their hotel rooms, Kim is confronted by Dupont who reveals his duplicity. Morgan subdues Dupont, only for him to be rescued by Chang and another mercenary. Satisfied that he fulfilled his purpose, Chang shoots Dupont while Morgan and Kim make a run for it. Morgan reaches a contact who tells them the location of the barrels. Morgan recognizes the location as being an old hangout of his and Scott's. Chang arrives, kills the contact, forcing Morgan and Kim to flee.

The two finally reach the old hangout which is a cavern. Upon retrieving the uranium rod, Chang corners them and reveals he had been tracking them the whole time. Chang takes the uranium rod, kidnaps Kim and attempts to leave Morgan to die of radiation. Morgan survives due to a prototype protective powder developed by the WHO.

Morgan escaped the cavern and meets with Madumo, a rebel leader. Chang attempts to escape on a freight train headed to Point City. Morgan rallies the rebels to launch a massive assault against the train. The rebels are defeated by the government troops. Morgan and Madumo infiltrate the train. They are attacked by Chang's remaining mercenaries. After killing both of them, Morgan drops in, frees Kim and fights Chang. Morgan throws Chang off the train. Kim manages to detach the forward cars, leading them to a track in which the rebels sabotaged, killing all the soldiers. Scott's uncle, a CIA agent, arrives to provide extraction. However Morgan opts to save the uranium rod first. The second half of the train stops at a bridge where Chang reveals himself and attempts to drown Kim. Morgan arrives an sets Chang on fire, where he explodes along with the explosives on board the train. Morgan fishes Kim out of the water and drags her onto shore. Madumo arrives with the remaining rebels as Morgan and Kim kiss.

An African warrior is seen observing all that has transpired.

== Cast ==
- Billy Zane as Rick Morgan, an American miner who has his name defiled by the events.
- Robert Downey Jr. as Jim Scott, an ex-CIA agent who later becomes the leader of a rebel group.
- Cary-Hiroyuki Tagawa as Mr. Chang, a rogue agent and ex-business partner of Scott.
- Lisa Collins as Dr. Kim Woods, a respected researcher from the World Health Organization.
- Ron Silver as Maurice Dupont, a corrupt politician in cahoots with Chang, only to be betrayed by him.
- Patrick Shai as Madumo, rebel leader and Scott's second-in-command who later teams up with Morgan.
- Russel Savadier as Nando, ex-informant and bar owner.
- Greg Latter as Portuguese Sergeant
- Eric Miyeni as Military Driver
- Elizabeth Mathebula as African Woman
- Zane Meas as Indian Sergeant
- Connie Magilo as Tebi, Scott's Wife
- Waylin Jansen as Scarlett, Scott's Daughter
- Patrick Ndlovu as Minister
- George Lamola as Scott's Jeep Driver
- Chris Buchanan as Mercenary #1
- Tshepo Nzimande as Mercenary #2
- Cordell McQueen as Mercenary #3
- Hector Rabotabi as Rebel #1
- Tracy Lee Cundill as U.S. Reporter
- Harry Sekgobela as Dupont's Driver

== Reception ==
Critic Dennis Schwartz gave the film a grade C score, and summarised his review calling the movie a "superficial and uninteresting adventure film".
