= Lisa Collins =

Australian actress (born 1968)

- Born: 1968 (age 57–58); Australia
- Other name: Liza Collins Zane
- Years active: 1979–1998
- Spouses: Billy Zane (m. 1989; div. 1995) Christopher MacLean (m. 2001)

Lisa Collins (born 1968) is an Australian actress best known for her starring role in the movie Fix (1997) and her portrayal of Louisa, the wife of Morgan Earp, in the 1993 film Tombstone. Collins was married to actor Billy Zane.

== Filmography ==
Year	Title	Role	Notes
1979	The Great Santini	Cheerleader	
1989	Going Overboard	Ellen	Credited as "Liza Collins Zane"
1989	Dead Calm	'Orpheus' Cruise Girl	
1992	Sinatra	Starlet	Miniseries
1993	Tombstone	Louisa Earp	
1994	Deep Red	Mrs. Rickman	TV movie
1994	The Adventures of Brisco County, Jr.	Emma Steed	TV series; 1 episode
1994	Web of Deception	Corrie Calvin	TV movie
1995	The Set-Up	Elizabeth	
1996	Danger Zone	Dr. Kim Woods	
1997	Fix		
1999–2000	Celebrity Deathmatch		TV series
