= Bob Doyle (activist) =

Irish soldier and communist activist

Robert Andrew Doyle
- Nickname: Bob Doyle
- Born: 12 February 1916; Dublin, Ireland
- Died: 22 January 2009 (aged 92) London, England
- Allegiance: Irish Republic; Second Spanish Republic; United Kingdom
- Branch: Anti-Treaty IRA; International Brigades; British Merchant Navy
- Service years: 1937-1938 (International Brigades)
- Conflicts: Spanish Civil War; World War II

Robert Andrew Doyle (12 February 1916 – 22 January 2009) was a communist activist and soldier from Ireland. He was active in two armed conflicts: the Spanish Civil War as a member of the International Brigades and the Second World War as a member of the British Empire's Merchant Navy.

== Early life ==
Doyle was born in a North King Street tenement in Dublin, Ireland and became interested in politics during the 1930s. In 1933, he was part of an anti - communist mob that attacked Connolly House. He joined the Irish Republican Army (IRA) after losing his left eye in a brawl with Blueshirts. He quickly became more interested in social rather than Irish nationalist issues and in 1937 decided to volunteer for the International Brigades, motivated in part by the fact that his friend and IRA veteran Kit Conway had been killed in action in the Battle of Jarama on Doyle's 21st birthday.

== Service in Spain ==
His attempt at joining the Brigade was initially rejected by the Irish Communist Party—who vetted new recruits—as he was deemed too young. He attempted to travel to Spain by stowing away aboard a boat bound for Valencia, where he was detained and expelled. He eventually returned by crossing the Pyrenees from France. After he returned to Spain, he reported to a battalion at Figueras. He was initially assigned to train new recruits due to his IRA experience, but he disobeyed orders in order to reach the front lines.

== Capture and release ==
After fighting at Belchite, he was captured at Gandesa by the Italian fascist Corpo Truppe Volontarie in 1938, alongside Irish International Brigade leader Frank Ryan.

He was imprisoned for 11 months in San Pedro de Cardeña — a concentration camp near Burgos. During his captivity, he was once brought out to be executed, regularly tortured by Spanish fascist guards, and interrogated by the Gestapo before eventually being released in a prisoner exchange.

== World War II service ==
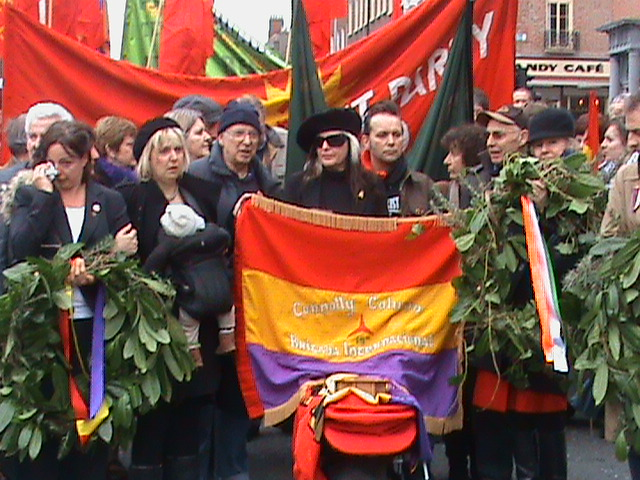
Doyle's ashes in the funeral procession, Dublin 2009

Doyle enlisted in the British merchant navy during World War II before settling in London with his Spanish wife, Lola. He became active in the Fleet Street print trade unions.

A regular visitor to Spain and Ireland for International Brigade commemorations, he published an account of his experiences in Spain in Brigadista: An Irishman’s Fight Against Fascism.

In an interview with The Irish Times, he said: "I thought there was a danger that Ireland would go fascist and that was one of the motivating factors in making up my mind to go to Spain."

== Family ==
Doyle and his wife Lola later gave birth to a son, noted film editor and special effects wizard Julian Doyle (filmmaker), who worked on such films as "Monty Python and the Holy Grail" and "Time Bandits".

== Death ==
Bob Doyle died at the age of 92 on 22 January 2009. His ashes were carried at the head of a funeral procession through the streets of Dublin, attended by large crowds, including members of the Irish Labour Party, the Communist Party of Ireland and Sinn Féin. He was the last surviving Irish veteran of the Spanish Civil War.

In July 2019, a plaque was unveiled on North King Street, where he was born, by his granddaughter
