= Malcolm Kohll =

- Born: 5 November 1953 (age 72); South Africa
- Occupations: Writer, producer

Malcolm Kohll (born 5 November 1953 in South Africa) is a writer and film producer.

== Education ==
He attended Rhodes University in Grahamstown, South Africa, where he trained as a journalist. On completing his course he came to London and did a post-graduate degree in film and television, at Middlesex Polytechnic.

== Career ==
While he was at the BBC's Script Unit in early 1987 he was contacted by Andrew Cartmel, script editor for the science fiction series Doctor Who. Kohll began to develop a concept entitled "The Flight of the Chimeron", and this became his first filmed script, as the serial "Delta and the Bannermen".

He then wrote and co-produced the political true story, The Fourth Reich, about the Nazis' attempt to implant a Nazi government in South Africa during World War II, directed by Manie Van Rensburg, produced by David Selvan and starring Marius Weyers.

As Head of Development at Focus Films in London, he co-produced 8 films. Kohll's most famous project was as one of the producers of the film The 51st State starring Samuel L. Jackson and Robert Carlyle. He also co-wrote the script to the film The Bone Snatcher.

Other producer credits include Surviving Evil starring Billy Zane and Natalie Mendoza, Chemical Wedding by Iron Maiden front man Bruce Dickinson and starring Simon Callow, Secret Society by director Imogen Kimmel and Julies Geist directed by Bettina Wilhelm and written by Jane Corbett.

He was Head of Film at the creative school AFDA in Cape Town from 1994 to 2009, and returned to Saoth Africa in 2014 to run the school. In 2017 he set up the Documentary Institute of South Africa (DOCi) with Michael S. Murphey to train black filmmakers.

== Bibliography ==
He wrote the novelisation of "Delta and the Bannermen" for Target Books, and Good Hope, a thriller published in 2014 (ISBN 978-1783082131).
