= The Deaths of Ian Stone =

- Promotional poster
- Directed by: Dario Piana
- Written by: Brendan Hood
- Produced by: Brian J. Gilbert; Ralph Kamp; Stan Winston
- Starring: Mike Vogel; Christina Cole
- Cinematography: Stefano Morcaldo
- Edited by: Celia Haining
- Music by: Elia Cmiral
- Production companies: Isle of Man Film; Odyssey Entertainment; Stan Winston Productions
- Distributed by: Entertainment in Video (UK); After Dark Films (US)
- Release dates: July 26, 2007 (Fantasy Filmfest); November 9, 2007 (After Dark Horrorfest)
- Running time: 87 minutes
- Countries: United Kingdom; United States
- Language: English

The Deaths of Ian Stone is a 2007 British-American horror film directed by Dario Piana. The film stars Mike Vogel and Christina Cole.

The story centers on an American man living in Britain, Ian Stone (Vogel), who is killed each day by mysterious beings. He then enters a new existence, unaware of his prior lives. When he begins to remember past existences, he is once again in danger of being killed, with each death more gruesome than the last.

== Plot ==
Ian Stone is an average man. He loves ice hockey but lives for his girlfriend, Jenny Walker. Late one night while driving home from a painful loss on the ice, Ian thinks he sees a dead body near the railroad tracks. Investigating the grisly discovery, Ian is attacked by the "corpse", forced onto the tracks and run over by a train.

He wakes up in an office cubicle. He is older and living with a beautiful woman named Medea. Jenny is not his girlfriend, just a co-worker, and one of a number of apparently familiar faces.

Ian meets a strange old man who tells him he is in danger. The old man tells him that he is being hunted by the Harvesters, a group of mind-controlling characters who cannot be killed and feed off human fear. He explains that every day, at different times and different places, the clocks stop and they come after him to kill him. The only problem is that Ian won't stay dead. He wakes in a new life, a new place, only for the cycle to repeat itself. Suddenly one of the Harvesters attacks the old man and Ian runs. They chase Ian back to his apartment where Medea, who is clearly one of them, is waiting. Once again, Ian is killed.

He wakes to find he is a junkie in a rundown apartment, with Jenny living a few doors down. He implores her to remember him, desperately reaching out and searching for someone to help him make sense of what's going on. When the Harvesters come again Jenny and Ian have no choice but to run. As they seek refuge on a subway train heading out of town, Jenny confesses to her memories of Ian's former lives. Later on, the old man meets Ian in the train again while Jenny sleeps. It is then that the old man reveals that he is one of the Harvesters, and hints at Ian's involvement with them.

When they disembark they are again confronted by a group of Harvesters, each a mass of pulsating veins, pitch-black muscles and flesh. Some of the barely human faces are recognizable from Ian's previous lives, including Medea who reveals a shocking truth: Ian was one of these monsters until he rebelled against the colony and managed to kill one other Harvester, and Medea used to be his "mate". Medea tries to force Ian to feed again and return to the "fold", but Ian resists.

Medea and the Harvesters attack once more, and she explains that his rebellion came after his first encounter with Jenny. So moved was he by the girl that he wished to live a mortal life with her. Before Medea can harm Jenny, however, a final change comes over Ian with the help of Gray, the old Harvester who had helped him before. Apparently Ian found a sustenance that was far superior to fear or pain, and so did the old man: love. Making this connection to a human being changes the specific nature of a Harvester, which allowed the old man (and now Ian) to kill the members of their kind. Gray had urged Ian to protect Jenny out of experience; having lost his love to the Harvesters, he could only feed on fear again and he spent what remained of his life slowly starving himself and trying to find love again. Gray implores Ian to feed from him and tap into those emotions of affection and kinship; Gray dies while restoring Ian. Ian regains his true power: his Harvester-self is finally born out of his human flesh, uniquely exuding goodness rather than malevolence. He now has the capacity to turn the tables on these creatures and to feed on their fear and to give life. He then rescues Jenny, who is being stalked by the clan.

Ian creates a new life for himself and Jenny, in which he is a successful professional hockey player with her at his side. Jenny has no recollection of their harrowing adventure; but Ian, having realized his abilities, will begin to take the fight to the Harvesters.

== Cast ==
- Mike Vogel as Ian Stone
- Christina Cole as Jenny Walker
- Michael Dixon as Brad Kopple
- Jaime Murray as Medea
- Charlie Anson as Josh Garfield
- Michael Feast as Gray
- Andrew Buchan as Ryan
- Marnix van den Broeke and Jeff Peterson as Harvesters

== Home media ==
The Deaths of Ian Stone was released via Region 1 DVD on March 18, 2008.

== Soundtrack ==
The film score by Elia Cmiral was released on Perseverance Records June 20, 2008.

== Reception ==
Critical reception for the movie has been mixed and it holds a rating of 57% on review aggregate website Rotten Tomatoes, with an average rating of 6/10, based on 7 reviews.
