= Alfons Adetuyi =

Canadian film and television director and producer

- Born: Sudbury, Ontario, Canada
- Occupations: Film director; television director; producer
- Relatives: Robert Adetuyi (brother)

Alfons Adetuyi is a Canadian film and television director and producer. A partner in the film and television production firm Inner City Films with his brothers Tom, Amos and Robert, he is most noted as the director of the theatrical feature films High Chicago and Love Jacked.

He has also directed episodes of the television series Jozi-H and Skin Deep, the miniseries Ekhaya: A Family Chronicle, and the television drama film Survivors. In 2024 he entered production on Dreams of the Moon, a coming-of-age drama about a young Black girl who dreams of becoming an astronaut.

Originally from Sudbury, Ontario, where he grew up as the son of a Nigerian immigrant who was the first Black employee of INCO's mining operations in the region, he is an alumnus of the Canadian Film Centre.
