= Web of Deception (1994 film) =

- Genre: Thriller
- Written by: Nevin Schreiner
- Directed by: Richard A. Colla
- Starring: Powers Boothe; Pam Dawber; Lisa Collins
- Theme music composer: Bob Alcivar
- Country of origin: United States
- Original language: English

Production
- Executive producer: Jennifer Alward
- Producer: Carol Dunn Trussell
- Production locations: Court House, Redwood City, California; Engineering Building, San Jose State University, San Jose, California; San Francisco
- Cinematography: James L. Carter
- Editor: Michael S. Murphy
- Running time: 92 min.
- Production companies: Hearst Entertainment Productions; Morgan Hill Films

Original release
- Network: NBC
- Release: April 25, 1994

Web of Deception is a 1994 American made-for-television thriller film directed by Richard A. Colla.

== Plot ==
Forensic psychologist Philip Benesch (Powers Boothe) finds himself framed for the apparent murder of disturbed court stenographer Corrie Calvin (Lisa Collins). When Benesch rebuffs Calvin's advances, she stalks him, showing up on his ferry ride home, and crashing his daughter Alexandra's (Jennifer Founds) 7th birthday party in a pink bunny suit.

While Benesch has a history of serial philandering, his desire to reconcile with his wife Ellen (Pam Dawber) drives him to reject Calvin's attempts to kindle a romance. Calvin then weaves a web of deception, stealing a handkerchief with Benesch's blood, letters he has written to previous paramours, a coffee mug with his fingerprints, and the gun from his desk. After confiding false evidence of a torrid love affair to her shrink, she shoots herself with Benesch's gun.

With the aide of defense attorney Larry Lake (Bradley Whitford) and police detective Fracinetti (Paul Ben-Victor) Benesch uses his psychiatric knowledge to unravel the nefarious web.

== Cast ==
- Powers Boothe as Philip Benesch
- Pam Dawber as Ellen Benesch
- Lisa Collins as Corrie Calvin
- Paul Ben-Victor as Detective Fracinetti
- Rosalind Chao as Dr. Sheila Prosser
- Brian Markinson as Earl Stage
- Jarion Monroe as Dr. Mike Dunn
- Anni Long as Rose Hempel
- Bradley Whitford as Larry Lake
