= Roy H. Wagner =

American cinematographer (born 1947)

- Born: Roy Henry Wagner III; January 12, 1947 (age 78)
- Occupation: Cinematographer

Roy Henry Wagner III (born January 12, 1947) is an American cinematographer known for dramatic, dark imagery. Named by Kodak as one of the "Top 100 Directors of Photography in the World" Wagner's career has spanned 35 years in the motion picture and television industries. He has also received the ASC Award for Outstanding Achievement in Cinematography for a Miniseries, and is a two-time Primetime Emmy Award nominee.

Wagner is a member of the Academy of Motion Picture Arts and Sciences and the American Society of Cinematographers and has won the Producers Guild "Vision Award". He studied with Ansel Adams who taught him to rise to the challenge of new technology. Wagner is extremely active within the American Society of Cinematographers, and contributes much of his free time furthering the charter of the organization.

== Filmography ==
Film

- Nine Deaths of the Ninja (1985)
- Pray for Death (1985)
- Witchboard (1986)
- Return to Horror High (1987)
- Nightforce (1987)
- A Nightmare on Elm Street 3: Dream Warriors (1987)
- Another Stakeout (1993)
- Drop Zone (1994)
- Nick of Time (1995)
- The Pest (1997)
- Cyclops, Baby (1997) (Short film)
- A Rumor of Angels (2000)
- Skinwalkers (2002)
- Shackles (2005)
- Trouble Sleeping (2015)

Direct-to-video

- K-9: P.I. (2002)
- Bachelor Party 2: The Last Temptation (2008)
- Streets of Blood (2009)
- Blood and Bone (2009)

TV series

Year	Title	Notes
1987	Beauty and the Beast	5 episodes Won Emmy Award for Outstanding Cinematography for a Series Nominated for ASC Award Outstanding Cinematography in Regular Series
1987-88	Houston Knights	13 episodes
1989	Quantum Leap	6 episodes Won Emmy Award for Outstanding Cinematography for a Series
1989-90	Christine Cromwell	4 episodes
1990	Cop Rock	10 episodes
1991	The Antagonists	1 episodes
1991	Under Cover	3 episodes
1992	Mann & Machine	9 episodes
1992	2000 Malibu Road	5 episodes
1994-96	Party of Five	43 episodes
1997	Gun	3 episodes
1997-99	Cracker	
1998-99	Fantasy Island	10 episodes
1999-2000	Get Real	22 episodes
2000-01	CSI: Crime Scene Investigation	9 episodes
2001	Pasadena	9 episodes
2002	Push, Nevada	7 episodes
2005-06	House	36 episodes
2007	Burn Notice	12 episodes
2007	Kidnapped	7 episodes
2009	The Beast	12 episodes
2009	The Unusuals	10 episodes
2009-10	Make It or Break It	19 episodes
2013	Elementary	12 episodes
2016	Ray Donovan	2 episodes

TV movies

Year	Title	Notes
1988	Disaster at Silo 7	Nominated for Emmy Award for Outstanding Cinematography for a Miniseries
1989	Nasty Boys	
1992	Drug Wars: The Cocaine Cartel	Nominated for ASC Award for Outstanding Cinematography in a Special
1993	Hart to Hart Returns	
1999	In the Company of Spies	
2003	Coyote Waits	
2004	A Thief of Time	
2007	The Dukes of Hazzard: The Beginning	
2012	A Smile as Big as the Moon	
2012	Blue Lagoon: The Awakening	

== Miscellaneous credits ==
- Visions of Light: The Art of Cinematography (1992 – Film, Committee Member: ASC education)

== Quotes ==
- "I...would like to take the curse off of technology. There is no reason why any director should fear new ideas or technologies that might significantly contribute to their ability to tell stories."
