= Turn It Up (film) =

2000 action hood directed by Robert Adetuyi

- Directed by: Robert Adetuyi
- Screenplay by: Robert Adetuyi
- Story by: Ray Daniels; Chris Hudson; Kelly Hilaire
- Produced by: Guy Oseary; Happy Walters
- Starring: Pras; Vondie Curtis-Hall; Ja Rule; Tamala Jones
- Cinematography: Hubert Taczanowski
- Edited by: Jeff Freeman
- Music by: Frank Fitzpatrick
- Distributed by: New Line Cinema
- Release date: September 6, 2000
- Running time: 86 minutes
- Country: United States
- Language: English
- Budget: $13 million
- Box office: $1.2 million

Turn It Up is a 2000 American action hood film written and directed by Robert Adetuyi, and starring Ja Rule, Pras, Faith Evans and Jason Statham. It marked Ja Rule's film debut.

The film was released by New Line Cinema on September 6, 2000 to generally negative reviews from critics who noted it "patently absurd in both the details and larger aspects"; it was also a financial disappointment.

== Cast ==
- Pras as Diamond
- Ja Rule as David "Gage" Williams
- Jason Statham as "Mr. B"
- Tamala Jones as Kia
- Vondie Curtis-Hall as Cliff
- John Ralston as Mr. White
- Chris Messina as Baz
- Eugene Clark as Marshall
- Faith Evans as Natalie
- Chang Tseng as Mr. Chang

== Production ==
Turn It Up was filmed in Toronto, Ontario, Canada and Denial NiteClub, 360 Adelaide St. W, Toronto, Ontario, Canada.

== Reception ==
On Rotten Tomatoes, the film has an approval rating of 10%, based on reviews from 39 critics. The website's consensus reads, "Reviewers say Turn It Up has a derivative feel, running through too many urban movie cliches." On Metacritic, it has a score of 18 out of 100, based on reviews from 16 critics, indicating "overwhelming dislike". Audiences polled by CinemaScore gave the film an average grade of "D−" on an A+ to F scale.

Roger Ebert gave the film 1 and a half stars out of 4, praising Vondie Curtis-Hall's performance but criticizing the film for portraying the central characters in a positive light, writing: "“Turn It Up” tells the story of a moral weakling who compromises his way through bloodbaths and drug deals while whining about his values. Here’s one of those movies where the more the characters demand respect, the less they deserve it. What’s pathetic is that “Turn It Up” halfway wants its hero to serve as a role model, but neither the hero nor the movie is prepared to walk the walk."

=== Box office ===
The film grossed $1,247,949 during its brief theatrical run.

== See also ==
- List of hood films
