= Borderline (2002 film) =

2002 film

- Written by: David Loucka
- Directed by: Evelyn Maude Purcell
- Starring: Gina Gershon; Michael Biehn; Sean Patrick Flanery; Louise Barnes
- Composer: Anthony Marinelli
- Country of origin: United States
- Original language: English

Production
- Producers: Thomas Becker; Frank Hübner; Brad Krevoy; David Lancaster; Adam Richman

Original release
- Release: November 15, 2002

Borderline is a 2002 American psychological thriller television film directed by Evelyn Maude Purcell, about borderline personality disorder. It was released to lukewarm reception.

== Synopsis ==
During her divorce, Dr. Lila Coletti (Gina Gershon), a criminal psychiatrist, loses custody of her two daughters, partially because her job working with the criminally insane is dangerous. At about the same time, a supposedly cured psychopathic patient, Ed Baikman (Sean Patrick Flanery), is released. When Lila's husband and his girlfriend are murdered, Ed seems the obvious suspect, especially since the m.o. is identifiably his. Yet there are other reasons for suspecting that the real culprit is Lila. The mentally disturbed Baikman, having had his romantic overtures rebuffed by Lila, has sought to frame her for the murders.

== Cast ==
- Gina Gershon as Dr. Lila Coletti
- Michael Biehn as Detective Macy Kobacek
- Sean Patrick Flanery as Ed Baikman
- Louise Barnes as Karen Kendler

== Reception ==
"You may guess whodunit, but you won’t be bored as this well-made thriller's characters play cat-and-mouse games in and out of the boudoir," commented TV Guide, while a review at DVD Talk stated, "A standard murder mystery with an unusually uninvolving development, Borderline is mysteriously rated R but is definitely not an exploitation film or an erotic thriller (no nudity in the love scenes, hardly any swearing)."
