= George McElroy (journalist) =

American journalist (1922–2006)

- Born: George Albert McElroy; May 25, 1922; Third Ward, Houston, Texas, U.S.
- Died: October 7, 2006 (aged 84); Houston, Texas, U.S.
- Resting place: Houston National Cemetery
- Other name: "Mr. Mac"
- Education: Master of Journalism
- Alma mater: Texas State University for Negroes (1956); University of Missouri (1970)
- Occupations: Armed Forces veteran, newspaper columnist, teacher
- Years active: 1938–2006
- Employer(s): US Navy, USAF, Houston Informer, Houston Post, Jet Magazine, University of Houston, Texas Southern University
- Organization(s): Press Club of Houston, Houston Association of Black Journalists, Sigma Delta Chi, Omega Psi Phi
- Known for: First African American to receive a Master of Journalism degree from the University of Missouri
- Notable credit(s): Pioneer of African American journalists, columnist for the Houston Informer and Houston Post, Head of the Journalism Department at Texas Southern University
- Spouses: Maxine Prudhomme (m. 1940–1946) Lucinda Martin (m. 1950–1995)
- Children: 5 daughters; including Kathleen
- Awards: Lifetime Achievement

George Albert McElroy (May 25, 1922 – October 7, 2006) was an American journalist. Born in Houston, Texas, he served in the United States Armed Forces before pursuing a career in journalism. Among many "firsts" achieved by McElroy, he became the first African American to earn a master's degree in journalism from the School of Journalism at the University of Missouri.

== Early life ==
George McElroy was born 25 May 1922 in Houston, Texas to Hugh George McElroy and Philomena McElroy. His father was a highly decorated United States Army veteran who fought in the Spanish-American War, the Pancho Villa Expedition and World War I, being awarded the Croix de Guerre for his service during the First World War. McElroy was raised in the Third Ward of Houston. After graduating from St. Nicholas High School, he served in the United States Navy, being stationed in Asia from 1940 to 1948 during and after World War II, then as an information specialist at Ellington Air Force Base in Houston.

== Education and fight against segregation ==
After he was honorably discharged from the military, McElroy returned to his still-segregated home state of Texas. Due to segregation (separate, but equal) laws of the time, he was forced to attend Texas Southern University (then-called Texas State University for Negroes (TSUN)) after being denied admission to the University of Texas (UT). He had applied to the University of Texas following the landmark decision of Sweatt v. Painter. In his letter of denial from UT, he was told that UT and TSUN both offered the courses he was seeking. Being a Negro, according to segregation laws, he had to attend TSUN. He responded to the denial letter from UT stating that although the courses were offered at both universities, there was little else "equal" about the universities. McElroy sued for the right to attend UT, but ultimately earned his bachelor's degree in journalism from TSUN in 1956. Ironically, 60 years later, his daughter, Kathleen, was named Director of the School of Journalism and Media at the University of Texas.

McElroy received a scholarship from the Wall Street Journal to attend the University of Missouri. In 1970, he became the first African American to earn a master's degree in journalism from the university.

== Journalism career ==
In 1937, McElroy landed a job as a youth column writer at the Informer, the oldest African-American newspaper in Texas. He was paid $3 per column. Throughout his off-and-on 58-year tenure with the newspaper, he functioned in virtually every capacity of running the periodical. He retired in 1996, but served as Editor Emeritus until his death in 2006.

After graduation from the University of Missouri, McElroy considered several job offers and accepted a position as a "colored sports" writer for the now-defunct Houston Post daily newspaper in 1954 and in 1956, he became a weekly columnist. He was the first black reporter and the first black columnist at the paper which, at that time, was the largest morning newspaper in Texas. In spite of his position as a regular columnist, his likeness in the paper above his column was a black and white sketch of his image as opposed to photos as presented for his white counterparts at the paper.

In response to question to him c. 1970 from a reader of his column, McElroy responded:

The world, the nation, the state, the city are all multicolored, as in a rainbow and multiracial. A professional journalist simply cannot afford to reside in a racial-isolation ward. He must travel and he must converse and he must observe and he must be curious.

In 1960, during an annual meeting of the Houston Press Club, the club presented a skit portraying the year's presidential candidates. (McElroy was the first African American member of the club). Local television reporter Dave Ward portrayed democratic candidate Lyndon Johnson. Performing in whiteface, McElroy portrayed the role of Alabama Gov. George Wallace, a vigilant segregationist, after no one else wanted to portray the independent candidate. (Note: Gov. George Wallace is best known for his infamous attempt to block the de-segregation of the University of Alabama and four elementary schools in defiance of federal mandates. Webb, Debbie. "Wallace in the Schoolhouse Door: Marking the 40th Anniversary of Alabama's Civil Rights Standoff". NPR.org.) This portrayal made McElroy the first black cast member of the club's annual "Gridiron Show". Picketers lined the streets and the cast members received death threats leading to Houston mayor Louie Welch providing police protection for McElroy for 72 hours.

Also in 1960, thirteen students from Texas Southern, led by Eldrewey Stearns, held a sit-in at the counter at a Houston area Weingarten store in protest of segregation using a model laid out by experienced sit-in students at Fisk University. In planning how to attract press coverage for the sit-in, they contacted McElroy for input who committed to send a photographer from The Informer and advised on calling the police themselves. This tip proved to be instrumental in the protest. Over 100 people eventually participated in the protest which ended peacefully. The Houston television and printed press coverage dubbed the event as the "first sit-in west of the Mississippi."

McElroy also served as the Texas correspondent for Jet Magazine and was elected as President of the Press Club of Houston. Throughout his career as a journalist, McElroy interviewed numerous persons of interest including Martin Luther King Jr., Fidel Castro, Muhammad Ali, George Foreman and six American presidents.

In a 2000 interview, McElroy stressed the continued need for black press, stressing that African Americans are closer to the issues concerning their own community. He also credited the black press for being first in bringing the effects of crack cocaine into the limelight, long before it was deemed an issue in mainstream media.

We cover issues that the major dailies don't see or fail to see. We're closer to problems and concerns in our community. We see them first.

== Teaching career ==
Simultaneously with his journalism career, McElroy taught journalism in the Houston area for over four decades.

- HISD: Phyllis Wheatley High School
- HISD: Jack Yates High School (1957–1969)
  - Chairman of the Journalism Department
  - Sponsored the "Andrew Hatcher Journalism Club", named after President John Kennedy's press secretary
- University of Houston - professor of journalism for four years
- Texas Southern University - retired in 1989
  - Chair of the Journalism Department
  - Professor of Journalism

== Firsts and honors ==
=== Firsts ===
George McElroy was a pioneer for African Americans in the field of journalism. Throughout his life he became the first African American:

- to earn a master's degree in journalism from the Missouri School of Journalism at the University of Missouri.
- to write for the Houston Post.
- with a journalism degree to teach journalism in the Houston Independent School District.
- initiated into the Texas Gulf Coast chapter of Sigma Delta Chi, the national journalism fraternity.
- member of the Houston Press Club
- to teach journalism at the University of Houston
- to win first place from the Texas Gulf Coast Press Association (for his editorials in the Informer).

McElroy was also the first minority of any race to have a regular column in a Houston newspaper

=== Honors ===
Throughout his life, McElroy received over 100 awards and honors including:

- 2021: Headliners Foundation Scholarship (posthumous honor)

McElroy is the first person of color honored with a scholarship at this foundation

- 2006: Houston Association of Black Journalists (HABJ) - Lifetime achievement Award (September 2006)
- 2000: Golden Pen Award from the Black Heritage Society (for individuals making significant contributions to African American Heritage)
- 1977: "George McElroy Week" was proclaimed by Houston mayor Fred Hofheinz.
- 1964: Co-director of the first annual High School Reporters' Conference, held at Prairie View A&M University

=== Scholarships ===
Several journalism-related scholarships have been named in honor of George McElroy's contributions to journalism, including:

- The Press Club of Houston Educational Foundation - George McElroy Distinguished Lifetime Achievement Scholarship ($1,000)
- Houston Association of Black Journalists - George McElroy Scholarship

== Other affiliations ==
- Member of Omega Psi Phi
- President of the Houston Breakfast Club
- President of the Press Club of Houston

== Military service ==
From 1940 to 1943, McElroy served in the Navy during World War II and served in the United States Merchant Marines from 1944 through 1945. From 1951 to 1952 during the Korean War, he served as an Information Officer at Ellington Air Force Base where he met his second wife, Lucinda Martin McElroy, who was serving as a corporal in the US Air Force.

In 1973, McElroy was commissioned by Texas Governor Dolph Briscoe to serve as an admiral in the state's navy. He declined the commission opting to continue his journalism career.

== Personal life ==
McElroy was first married to the late Maxine Prudhomme. They had one child, Madeline. (Note: McElroy's children followed in his journalistic footsteps. In April 2023, Madeline Johnson retired from her position Producer/Director of Radio for the Archdiocese of Galveston-Houston after 45 years in the position. Radio Ministry at the Archdiocese of Galveston-Houston) His second marriage was to Air Force veteran Lucinda Martin in 1950 with whom he had four more daughters, Toni, Linda, Kathleen and Sherridan. George and Lucinda were married nearly 45 years until her death in 1995. (Note: Kathleen McElroy worked as an editor at the New York Times from 1991-2011. Texas A&M Former Journalism Students Association)

In 2006, McElroy was hospitalized with respiratory illness. In September 2006, McElroy received word that he would be honored with the Lifetime Achievement Award from the Houston Association of Black Journalists at their 20th Annual Scholarship Gala. Although receiving medical treatment at the time, McElroy received permission from his attending physicians, and attended the event. McElroy received his award and gave his acceptance speech. Shortly after the event, McElroy fell gravely ill with acute pneumonia and died on October 6. His funeral services were held at St. Mary of the Purification Catholic Church and his remains were interred at Houston National Cemetery in Houston, Texas.

== See also ==
- Sweatt v. Painter
- National Association of Black Journalists (NABJ)
