= Elroy =

Elroy may refer to:

== Places in the United States ==
- Elroy, North Carolina, a census-designated place
- Elroy, a village in Franconia Township, Pennsylvania
- Elroy, Texas, an unincorporated community
- Elroy, Wisconsin, a city

== People and fictional characters ==
- Elroy (given name)

== See also ==
- James Ellroy (born 1948), American crime fiction writer and essayist
- McElroy, surname
