= In the Company of Spies =

- Genre: Spy; Thriller; Action
- Written by: Roger Towne
- Directed by: Tim Matheson
- Starring: Tom Berenger; Ron Silver; Alice Krige; Clancy Brown; Arye Gross
- Music by: Don Davis
- Country of origin: United States
- Original language: English

Production
- Executive producer: Roger Towne
- Producers: Robert W. Cort; David Madden
- Cinematography: Roy H. Wagner
- Editor: Robert A. Ferretti
- Running time: 104 minutes
- Production company: Cort/Madden Productions

Original release
- Network: Showtime
- Release: October 24, 1999

In the Company of Spies (also known as The Agency) is a 1999 made-for-television spy action thriller film directed by Tim Matheson and starring Tom Berenger, Ron Silver, Alice Krige, and Clancy Brown.

== Plot ==
A CIA operative (Clancy Brown) is arrested and accused of being a spy by Korean officials. The CIA want to get him back as he has vital information for the United States. To rescue their operative, they recruit Kevin Jefferson (Tom Berenger), a retired CIA operative to create and lead the team to rescue the operative before the Koreans break him.

== Cast ==
- Tom Berenger as Kevin Jefferson
- Ron Silver as Tom Lenahan
- Alice Krige as Sarah Gold
- Clancy Brown as Dale Beckman
- Arye Gross as Todd Simar
- Elizabeth Arlen as Joanne Gertz
- Al Waxman as Myron Sindell
- Len Cariou as The President

== Reception ==
Rainer Heinz of Filmdienst gave the film a mixed-to-negative review, saying that although it is somewhat exciting, the film is ultimately ideologically outdated, simplistic, and propagandistic.

== Production ==
"the most extensive CIA cooperation with movie makers ever,"
