= Chemical Wedding (film) =

2008 film by Julian Doyle

- Theatrical poster
- Directed by: Julian Doyle
- Written by: Bruce Dickinson; Julian Doyle
- Produced by: David Pupkewitz; Malcolm Kohll; Ben Timlett; Justin Peyton
- Starring: Simon Callow; Kal Weber; Lucy Cudden; Jud Charlton; Paul McDowell; John Shrapnel; Terence Bayler; Mike Shannon; Bruce Dickinson
- Production companies: Bill&Ben Productions; Focus Films
- Distributed by: Warner Music Entertainment
- Release date: 4 May 2008
- Running time: 106 minutes
- Country: United Kingdom
- Language: English

Chemical Wedding (released in the U.S. as Crowley) is a 2008 British science-fantasy horror film produced by Bill and Ben Productions in conjunction with the London-based Focus Films. It is directed by Julian Doyle. The story is based on an original screenplay by Bruce Dickinson, front man of heavy metal band Iron Maiden. Dickinson released a solo album entitled The Chemical Wedding in 1998, which, despite sharing the title and title track from the film's soundtrack, is otherwise unrelated.

== Plot ==
In 1947, Trinity College students Symonds (a theologian) and Alex (a scientist) visit the elderly Aleister Crowley. Crowley discusses the possibility of resurrecting from the dead with the help of sex magic rituals. The students deliver a letter, from which Crowley learns that one of his students gave away the secret of the "Moon Child" ritual to a science fiction writer. Finding no money in the letter, Crowley curses those who "steal his time", spits blood at Alex and dies. Symonds takes his watch.

Fifty years later, Symonds has become a lecturer at Trinity College and is the head of the local Masonic lodge. Alex is a physicist who is paralyzed and uses a wheelchair.

A Dr. Mathers arrives from the California Institute of Technology with a "virtual reality spacesuit": he is conducting an experiment in which a human will connect to a virtual reality generated by Trinity’s supercomputer, Z93. Journalist Lia Robinson arranges an interview with him.

Victor, a follower of Crowley, works as a programmer on the project. He conspires with literature professor Oliver Haddo to insert "Aleister Crowley's binary code" (the locations and contents of all rituals) into Z93 as a virus. Before the first official tests, Victor takes Haddo to the laboratory and Haddo puts on the "spacesuit".

Crowley possesses Haddo's body. He delivers obscene lectures and scandalizes the faculty. He claims the Aeon of Horus will begin in three days, when he is fully incarnated. Only Robinson believes that Haddo is Crowley, after conducting an investigation in the library. Crowley forces Victor to participate in a sex ritual, and makes him his disciple.

Mathers and Victor conduct an experiment by placing Professor Brent in the spacesuit. He finds himself in the virtual reality, where he meets Crowley. Brent has a heart attack and his brain stops responding to the outside world. Robinson and Mathers, with the help of Symonds, try to prove to the dean that Haddo was in the spacesuit before Brent and was "programmed" by Victor.

Meanwhile, Crowley is looking for a red-haired girl for the final ritual, the "Chemical Wedding", which is supposed to stabilize Crowley's power in this world. He intends that several people will be killed, including Robinson's roommate. Robinson follows him, and Crowley and Victor catch her at the ritual site.

Alex explains to Mathers that the spacesuit is imbued with an elemental, the result of a ritual performed in 1947 by rocket engineer Jack Parsons and science fiction writer L. Ron Hubbard. In order to find Lia, Mathers and Symonds interrogate Brent under hypnosis, but receive only a few Masonic terms.

To find out the location of the Chemical Wedding, Mathers dons the spacesuit himself. Symonds operates the control panel, replacing the data disc with the recording of Brent's journey with a "Space Flight Simulator" disc that can reverse time. Mathers discovers that Brent was entering a black hole that consumes space and time.

While Crowley and Victor perform a ritual using Lia's blood, Mathers appears near Crowley. Initially trapped behind an "invisible barrier", Mathers breaks through that barrier. He knocks the syringe containing Lia's blood out of Crowley's hands, stopping the ritual.

When Mathers vanishes from the laboratory, Symonds loads the "Flight Simulator". Time flows backwards. The spacesuit returns, but Symonds discovers Haddo inside. It is again the day of the experiment with Haddo.

Symonds discovers no one remembers anything about the last three days. Alex explains to him that somewhere there is a parallel world where Crowley did reincarnate, and that world is worse than ours. Alex has only two questions - who killed Lia’s roommate Rosa in the current reality, and why was Mathers able to pass through the barrier. A newspaper lying nearby carries a headline that Al Gore has won the 2000 United States presidential election.

Scientists attempt the virtual reality experiment. Victor cannot reset the date on the spacesuit, which is set three days later. Mathers tells him the password to the spacesuit, which is his date of birth (which coincides with the date of Crowley's death, 1 December 1947). The computer, in response to the password, displays the words "Moon Child". At Haddo's lecture, Symonds and Alex discover that Crowley's watch, which Symonds was carrying with him, has disappeared.

== Cast ==
- Simon Callow as Professor Oliver Haddo/Aleister Crowley
- Kal Weber as Dr. Joshua Mathers
- Lucy Cudden as Lia Robinson
- Jud Charlton as Victor Nuberg
- Paul McDowell as Symonds
- John Shrapnel as Aleister Crowley (original)
- Terence Bayler as Professor Brent
- Mike Shannon as Alex
- Bruce Dickinson as Crowley's landlord and as a blind man
- Richard Franklin as Dean of Trinity College University of Cambridge

== Production ==
The film was originally proposed in 2000 and was to have been produced by Terry Jones' Messiah Films, but was later adopted by Focus Films. David Pupkewitz and Malcolm Kohll produced the film, with Ben Timlett and Justin Peyton of Bill and Ben Productions and Duellist Film Production in association with MotionFX and E-Motion. Executive producers are Andy Taylor, Paul Astrom-Andrews, and Peter Dale.

Warner Music released the film's soundtrack in the UK, while Edward Noeltner's Cinema Management Group handled international sales. The film received its world première at the Sci-Fi-London film festival on 4 May 2008.

According to Rockerparis, Iron Maiden lead singer Bruce Dickinson was in Paris on 26 November to promote the film's DVD release. The screening and press conference were held in a private cinema in front of Europe 1 radio near the Champs Elysées. Dickinson, who has a small cameo role in the film, has stated, "On several levels, I think it will be nice for them ([Iron Maiden fans]) to see somebody from Maiden doing something else that gets the band's name out there and also potentially gets a bit of respect for heavy metal and all the rest of it....But, in addition, I think they'll just enjoy it. It's a rollicking good story."

== Reception ==
Horror.com praised the film, calling it "a mixed bag of tricks to be sure, but it's worth a look for the curio factor. (At least it's not a remake, a J-horror knock-off, or torture porn.)"

== Soundtrack ==
Track listing:

1. "Chemical Wedding" – Bruce Dickinson
2. "Hush Hush Here Comes the Bogie Man" – Henry Hall / Val Rosing
3. "Fanlight Fanny" – George Formby
4. "Man of Sorrows" – Bruce Dickinson
5. "The Wicker Man" – Iron Maiden
6. "Can I Play with Madness" – Iron Maiden
7. "Separation" – Skin
8. "Prélude à l'après-midi d'un faune" – Debussy
9. "The Hallelujah Chorus" – Handel
10. (Excerpt) "Violin Concerto" – Mozart
