= Brennan McElroy =

American basketball player

Personal information
- Born: May 12, 1992 (age 34)
- Listed height: 6 ft 7 in (2.01 m)
- Listed weight: 195 lb (88 kg)

Career information
- High school: St. Teresa Catholic (Decatur, Illinois)
- College: Indianapolis (2010–2015)
- NBA draft: 2015: undrafted
- Playing career: 2015–present
- Position: Power forward
- Number: 10

Career history
- 2015–2016: TV 1872 Saarlouis
- 2016: Tokyo Cinq Reves
- 2017–2018: Tokyo Hachioji Trains

Career highlights
- GLVC All-Defensive Team (2015)

Brennan McElroy (born May 12, 1992) is an American former professional basketball player who last played for Tokyo Hachioji Trains in Japan.
