= Trouble Sleeping (film) =

- Film poster
- Directed by: Robert Adetuyi
- Written by: Robert Adetuyi
- Produced by: Robert Adetuyi; Linda Eskeland; Roger Fex; Greg McKay
- Starring: Billy Zane; Vanessa Angel; Fred Stoller; Joel Polis
- Cinematography: Roy H. Wagner
- Edited by: Lisa di Michele
- Music by: Roger Fex
- Production company: Trouble Sleeping Productions
- Release date: 2022
- Running time: 93 minutes
- Countries: United States; Canada
- Language: English

Trouble Sleeping is a 2022 psychological thriller film written and directed by Robert Adetuyi and starring Billy Zane, Vanessa Angel, Fred Stoller, Rick Otto, Ingrid Eskeland, and Kale Clauson.

== Plot ==
Vanessa, a middle-aged woman, is haunted by the ghost of her late husband. Her stepson has just been released from a mental institution - four years ago he discovered his father's body, shot in the head, a supposed suicide. Now he's returning home and will inherit his late father's estate on his twenty-first birthday. However, Vanessa and her new younger husband have no intention of letting Justin get his hands on the money.

== Cast ==
- Billy Zane as Charles
- Vanessa Angel as Vanessa
- Fred Stoller as Dr. Gilbert
- Rick Otto as Alex
- Ingrid Eskeland as August
- Kale Clauson as Justin
- Joel Polis as Jack McKay

== Production ==
The film was produced by Greg Mckay, Roger Fex, and Linda Eskeland.

== Release and reception ==
The film, whose production had started in 2015, was released in 2022 only. A very mixed review at HeyUGuys wrote, "Tonally, a rather different stance for Adetuyi albeit the light-hearted comedy seeps through the nightmarish situations these characters find themselves in." Peter Gray, of ThisIsFilm, stated, "Again, if writer/director Robert Adetuyi (Stomp the Yard, Honey: Rise Up and Dance) intended Angel’s blasé reactions, Clauson’s stereotypically over-the-top craze, and Eskeland’s “vixen” vibe to be a deliberate reaction to the archetypal script then the soap operatic melodrama adhered to over the film's 90-odd minutes is a specific choice. If not? Trouble Sleeping is likely to bore audiences with its clichéd narrative and made-for-TV gloss, something that will be the more unacceptable should it not be viewed under the right comedic eye." A more positive review on Aiptomics.com, called the film a "neo-noir Melrose Place" and concluded, "Its premise sounds a little silly – mostly because it is – but that is part of the charm of Trouble Sleeping."
