= Tony McElroy =

- Known for: Scottish Labour Party Director of Communications

Tony McElroy is the former chief "spin doctor" for the Scottish Labour Party and was one of UK Prime Minister and Labour Party Leader Gordon Brown's press advisors during his leadership campaign.

Tony McElroy now manages Corporate and Government Affairs in Scotland for the retailing giant TESCO.
