= Elroy Pappot =

Dutch footballer

Personal information
- Date of birth: 20 April 1993 (age 33)
- Place of birth: Blaricum, Netherlands
- Height: 1.80 m (5 ft 11 in)
- Position: Attacking midfielder

Youth career
- SDO Bussum
- Utrecht

Senior career*
Years	Team	Apps	(Gls)
2012–2015	Utrecht	6	(1)
2014–2015	→ Fortuna Sittard (loan)	12	(0)
Total		18	(1)
- * Club domestic league appearances and goals

Elroy Pappot (born 20 April 1993) is a Dutch former professional footballer who played as an attacking midfielder.

== Career ==
Pappot made his Eredivisie debut against Roda coming on as an 85th-minute substitute for Édouard Duplan. On 28 April 2013, he scored the winning goal against PEC Zwolle.

== Personal life ==
In September 2015 Pappot returned to former youth club SDO Bussum.
