= The Bone Snatcher =

- Official teaser poster
- Directed by: Jason Wulfsohn
- Written by: Malcolm Kohll; Gordon Render
- Produced by: Izidore Codron; Koa Padolsky; Chris Roland; Malcolm Kohll
- Starring: Scott Bairstow; Rachel Shelley; Adrienne Pearce
- Cinematography: Andreas Poulsson
- Edited by: Richard Benwick
- Music by: Paul Heard; Mike Pickering
- Production companies: The Imaginarium; Focus Films; Persistence Pictures Inc.
- Distributed by: Overseas FilmGroup; First Look International
- Release date: 23 December 2003
- Running time: 96 minutes
- Countries: United Kingdom; Canada; South Africa
- Language: English
- Budget: $6 million

The Bone Snatcher is a 2003 British-Canadian horror film directed by Jason Wolfsohn and starring Scott Bairstow, Rachel Shelley, and Adrienne Pearce. The film is based on a screenplay by Malcolm Kohll and Gordon Render.

== Plot ==
When workers begin disappearing in a Namibian mine, Dr. Zack Straker and a search team are sent into the desert to find out why the geologists of a diamond expedition have lost radio contact. They arrive at the scientist's camp in the desert, but soon find the neatly gnawed bones of their colleagues and a trail that leads them to a strange rock formation. Soon it becomes clear that there is a murderous beast on the loose.

The researchers decided to investigate the structure, but in the gathering darkness, sheer hell breaks loose as the creature, composed of a swarm of ant-like insects wrapped around the bones of its victims, hunts them for their bones. A game of cat and mouse continues through the desert, with the team being slowly picked off and the bug and bone monster eventually being chased down in a derelict mine.

Zack finds it hard to decide to kill the yellow queen brain that controls the swarm that has killed dozens of people, but he eventually does so. Suddenly, the derelict mine structure starts to fall down, leaving Zack and Mikki to run back to the truck - where they find they are now the only survivors of the team. The film ends with Mikki driving into the distance, apparently oblivious that a box loaded into her taxi contains another queen brain.

== Cast ==
- Scott Bairstow as Dr. Zack Straker
- Rachel Shelley as Mikki
- Warrick Grier as Karl
- Patrick Shai as Titus
- Andre Weideman as Kurt
- Adrienne Pearce as Magda
- Patrick Lyster as Johan
- Brian Claxton Payne as The Creature
- Sean Higgs as Clive
- Jan Ellis as Harvey
- Langley Kirkwood as Paul
- Lulama J. Nombiba as Old Man
- Yusuf Hendrics as Taxi Driver
- Andre Jacobs as Dr. Muller
- Nikki Jackman as Mel
- Chris April as Muti Man
- Bo Petersen as Arctic Scientist 1
- Wayne Harrison as Arctic Scientist 2
- Rob van Vuuren as Arctic Scientist 3

== Production ==
The film was shot in the year 2002 in the South African city Cape Town and in the desert from Namibia.

== Release ==
The Bone Snatcher was released on DVD by First Look Pictures on 23 December 2003. It was re-released by Anchor Bay Entertainment on 26 July the following year. First Look later released the film on SteelBook on 5 May 2009.

== Reception ==
Critical reception for The Bone Snatcher has been predominantly negative. Film review aggregator Rotten Tomatoes reported an approval rating of 0%, based on 7 reviews, with a rating average of 3.14/10.

David Nusair of ReelFilm Reviews awarded the film a negative 1 out of a possible 4 stars, writing, "More than anything else, The Bone Snatcher is just dull. There's barely enough material here to fill a 15-minute short, let alone a 90-minute feature - and for a horror film, it's shockingly non-horrific". Wayne Southworth of The Spinning Image gave the film 4/10 stars, criticizing the garbled language, which made understanding what the actor's were saying difficult. Southworth, however, commended the film's desert location as the best thing about the movie.
