= Jozi-H =

- Genre: Medical drama
- Written by: Alyson Feltes
- Directed by: Anne Wheeler; Kelly Makin; Thabang Moleya; Neal Sundström; Dumisani Phakatha] Revel Fox; Alfons Adetuyi; George Mihalka
- Starring: Sarah Allen; Billöah Greene; Tumisho Masha; Vincent Walsh; Louise Barnes; Terence Bridgett; Lindelani Buthelezi; Tinah Mnumzana; Moshidi Motshegwa; Kekeletso Mphuti; Ilanit Shapiro; Renate Stuurman; Johan Von der Merwe
- Countries of origin: Canada; South Africa
- Original language: English
- No. of seasons: 1
- No. of episodes: 13

Production
- Executive producers: Mfundi Vundla; Adeelah Carrim; Amos Adetuyi; Alfons Adetuyi; Tony Dennis; Alyson Feltes; Marva Olliviere
- Producer: Stephen J. Turnbull
- Cinematography: Milan Podsedly (director of photography)
- Editors: Carl Morgan; Michael Pacek

Original release
- Network: CBC; SABC 3
- Release: 13 October 2006 – 2 February 2007

Jozi-H is a Canadian-South African television drama series that aired from 2006 to 2007. Co-produced by Morula Pictures of South Africa and Inner City Films from Canada, the series is a medical drama set at an inner city hospital in Johannesburg, South Africa.

The show's cast included Sarah Allen as Jenny Langford, a surgical registrar from Toronto; Vincent Walsh as Russ Monsour, a neurosurgeon from Winnipeg in search of a new start after the failure of his marriage; Neil McCarthy as Dr. Michael Bellman; Billoah Greene as Dr. Greg Nash; Thami Ngubeni as Dr. Ingrid Nyoka; Tumisho Masha as Dr. Zane Jara; Lindelani Buthelezi as Dr. Nthato Moroka; Louise Barnes as nurse Jocelyn Del Rossi; and Moshidi Motshegwa as nurse Nomsa Mangena.

The series premiered on 13 October 2006 on CBC Television in Canada, and ran for 13 episodes until concluding on 2 February 2007. Canadian television critics generally compared the show to ER, the dominant American medical drama series of its era.

The series was not renewed for a second season. Producer Alfons Adetuyi criticized the CBC for doing far too little in his estimation to actively promote the series.

In South Africa, the series premiered on SABC 3 in April 2007. It was subsequently rebroadcast by SABC 1 in 2010.

== Awards ==
Awards and nominations received by Transplant
Award	Year	Category	Nominee(s)	Result	Ref.
Gemini Awards	2007	Best Dramatic Series	Alfons Adetuyi, Amos Adetuyi, Adeelah Carrim, Tony Dennis, Alyson Feltes, Marva Ollivierre, Stephen J. Turnbull, Mfundi Vundla	Nominated	
Gemini Awards	2007	Best Guest Actress in a Drama Series	L. Scott Caldwell, "Love in the Time of AIDS"	Nominated	
Gemini Awards	2007	Best Direction in a Drama Series	Kelly Makin, "Fathers"	Nominated	
Gemini Awards	2007	Best Direction in a Drama Series	George Mihalka, "Love in the Time of AIDS"	Nominated	
