= Andrew Hatcher =

American advertising executive and press secretary

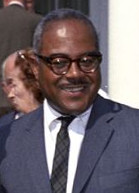
Andrew T. Hatcher in 1962

Andrew Hatcher (1923–1990) was an associate press secretary to President John F. Kennedy and a founder of 100 Black Men of America in 1963.

== Life and career ==
Born in Princeton, New Jersey, Hatcher graduated from Witherspoon School for Colored Children in 1937 and Princeton High School in 1941. He attended Springfield College in Springfield, Massachusetts and served three years in the United States Army as a second lieutenant until 1946. A few years later, he relocated to San Francisco, California, working as a journalist at the San Francisco Sun-Reporter and later as an assistant labor commissioner under Governor of California Pat Brown. From 1950 to 1959, Hatcher worked as a court clerk for Federal Judge Oliver J. Carter. In 1950, Hatcher worked with Pierre Salinger as a coordinator on Helen Gahagan Douglas's senatorial campaign against Richard Nixon. Hatcher served under Adlai Stevenson as a campaign organizer during Stevenson's two unsuccessful runs for President of the United States in 1952 and 1956. He worked on the 1958 campaign of Clair Engle.

In 1960 with his close friend Pierre Salinger, he joined Sen. John F. Kennedy’s campaign press staff as a speechwriter. Immediately after his election as President, Kennedy named both men to his White House staff, with Salinger as White House Press Secretary, and Hatcher as Assistant White House Press Secretary. This made Hatcher the highest ranking black person to serve in the White House. After Kennedy was assassinated, Hatcher resigned from the Johnson administration to support Salinger's successful senatorial campaign in California.

In 1972, Hatcher was working on the staff of Senator Henry M. Jackson. Hatcher also later worked as vice-president of an advertising agency.

Hatcher was married to Ruth Avery, with whom he had seven children. His young son Avery was a student in the home school which Jacqueline Kennedy established for her daughter Caroline Kennedy and children of White House staffers.

Hatcher died in 1990.
