= Julian Doyle (filmmaker) =

British filmmaker

Julian Doyle is a British filmmaker who is best known for his work as a longtime collaborator on the films of Monty Python, including effects photography for Monty Python and the Holy Grail, and editing Monty Python's Life of Brian and Monty Python's The Meaning of Life, as well as directing the second-unit on the Python affiliated films The Rutles: All You Need Is Cash, Erik the Viking, The Wind in the Willows, and Absolutely Anything. He also edited and shot the special effects for Terry Gilliam's films Brazil and Time Bandits.

== Early years ==
Doyle was born in London from an Irish father, Bob Doyle, and an Asturian mother. His father fought for the Republic in the Spanish Civil War. He schooled at Haverstock School and left to join Nobel Prize winner Prof. Peter Medawar's team as a junior technician at University College London. He completed his Bachelor of Science at the University of London before going to the London Film School.

== Career ==
Doyle has directed the films Love Potion (1987), about a drug rehabilitation centre, and Chemical Wedding (2008), an occult thriller starring Simon Callow which he wrote with Iron Maiden singer Bruce Dickinson. He has also written Twilight of the Gods, a play about the relationship between Wagner and Nietzsche which was performed at the Edinburgh Festival. In 2013, he later adapted the play into a film which he both wrote and directed.

He has also directed music videos, including those for Kate Bush's "Cloudbusting" and Iron Maiden's hit "Can I Play with Madness". He has written two books - Chemical Wedding, a novel that expands on the film, and The Life of (Brian) Jesus, which compares the Monty Python film with the actual Biblical events and comes to the conclusion that this is the most accurate Biblical film ever made. Doyle also appeared in the Monty Python film Monty Python and the Holy Grail, playing the police sergeant who abruptly ends the film by breaking the camera.

Julian Doyle authored: The Gospel According To Monty Python, published in 2014 with First Edition Design Publishing, located in Sarasota, Florida. Also authored The Jericho Manuscript in 2023, The Secret Life and Hidden Death of Judas the Galilean in 2020, JESUS, Fact or Fiction, in 2019, Who Killed Jesus? in 2018, Leonardo Da Vinci's Penultimate Supper, in 2025, The Ghost of Tom Mix in 2025, The After-Life of Brian in 2024, published by Chippenham Books, located in Chippenham, UK. Also published HERETICS: The True Christians in 2020, Chemical Wedding in 2017, independently published by author. Crucifixion's A Doddle: The Passion of Monty Python in 2016 with Clink Street Publishing.
