= Kathleen McElroy =

American journalism professor

Kathleen O. McElroy
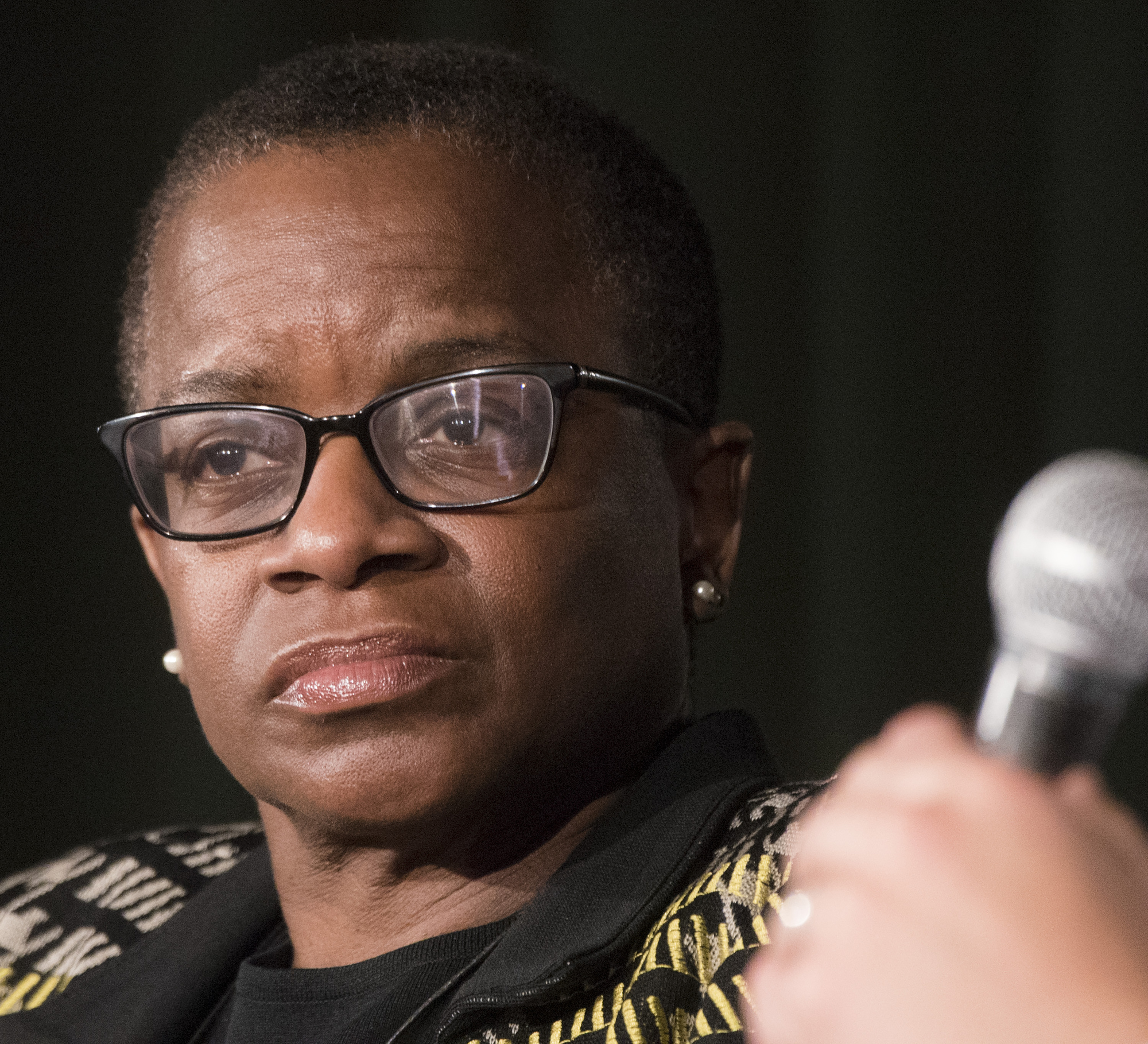
- Born: Kathleen Oveta McElroy; Houston, Texas, U.S.
- Parents: George McElroy (father); Lucinda Martin (mother)

Academic background
- Education: Texas A&M University (BA); New York University (MA); University of Texas at Austin (PhD)
- Thesis: Somewhere Between "Us" and "Them": Black Columnists and Their Role in Shaping Racial Discourse. (2014)
- Doctoral advisor: Paula M. Poindexter

Academic work
- Discipline: Journalism
- Sub-discipline: Racial representation in news media
- Institutions: Oklahoma State University; University of Texas at Austin

Kathleen Oveta McElroy is an American academic and journalist, the holder of the Frank A. Bennack Jr. Chair in journalism, and the former director of the School of Journalism and Media at the University of Texas at Austin from 2018 to 2022.

== Early life and education ==
Kathleen McElroy is the daughter of Lucinda Martin and George McElroy, the first African-American to earn a master's degree in journalism from the School of Journalism at the University of Missouri, and the first black columnist and reporter at the Houston Post.

McElroy was raised Catholic in the Third Ward of Houston. She received a Bachelor of Arts degree majoring in broadcast journalism and minoring in theater arts from Texas A&M University in 1981. While working for The New York Times, she attended New York University, graduating with a Master of Arts degree in 2010. Her master's thesis focused on the obituaries of Civil Rights leaders. She then attended the University of Texas at Austin, where she graduated with a doctorate in journalism in 2014.

== Career ==
McElroy's career in journalism began when she worked as a news and sports copy editor for The Bryan-College Station Eagle in 1983. She worked for The Huntsville Item in 1984. Then she was hired by the Austin American-Statesman in 1985 as a sports copy editor, later becoming an assistant arts & entertainment editor and ended working for the Austin newspaper in 1987. Later, McElroy worked for The New York Times for nearly 20 years, beginning in 1991, where she held various management positions, including associate managing editor, dining editor, deputy sports editor and deputy website editor. She left her position at the Times to pursue her doctorate at the University of Texas at Austin.

McElroy began as the director of the School of Journalism and Media at the Moody College of Communication at the University of Texas at Austin on June 1, 2018. She was the director until 2022.

== Texas A&M hiring incident ==
In June 2023, McElroy was selected to be the first to lead Texas A&M University's new journalism program since it had been dropped in 2004. After initially being presented with a tenured full-professor position, her offer was later watered down after A&M held a public signing ceremony announcing her hire. University officials had tried to delay the announcement of her hiring until after the legislative session had ended. Negotiations broke down due to changes in the offer given to McElroy, with press, faculty, and McElroy reporting that "outside influences" had rejected the nomination. Some of the outside influences were two conservative alumni groups, the Sul Ross Group and the Rudder Association, members of the Texas A&M University System Board of Regents, and M. Katherine Banks, the president of Texas A&M University. Some conservatives had expressed issues with her work on race and diversity and equity efforts in newsrooms. McElroy ultimately rejected the final offer, which had been watered down to a one-year contract that could be terminated at any time, and decided to remain at the University of Texas at Austin.

José Luis Bermúdez, the interim dean of the College of Arts and Sciences had called McElroy to tell her there were people who could compel administrators to fire her if she accepted the offer. He recommended to McElroy that she remain at her tenured position at the University of Austin because he could not protect her if outside forces wanted her gone. McElroy ended up taking his advice.

On July 17, following the media backlash, the interim dean of the College of Arts and Sciences at Texas A&M University, José Luis Bermúdez, resigned.

On July 19, 2023, the Texas A&M Faculty Senate passed a resolution to create a fact-finding committee into the mishandling of the hiring of McElroy. During that meeting, Banks told faculty members that she did not approve changes to an offer letter that led McElroy to walk away from negotiations amid conservative backlash to her hiring. Hart Blanton, the head of the university's Department of Communication and Journalism released a statement through his lawyer on July 21 that challenged Banks' statements from a July 19 faculty meeting in which she suggested that she didn't know why changes were made in the offers to McElroy. Blanton claimed that Banks had actually "injected herself into the process atypically and early on" and that a diminished offer given to McElroy had his signature forged on it by the university. In his statement, Blanton also said "the unusual level of scrutiny given to... Dr. McElroy was acknowledged by one administrator to have been based, at least in part, on race".

Banks submitted her resignation late in the evening of July 20 due to the fiasco.

McElroy hired legal counsel after the events. On August 2, Mark Welsh, who was appointed president after Banks' resignation, said "I would hope everyone at Texas A&M would offer an apology to Dr. McElroy, and no matter what happened, this didn't go well. Dr. McElroy by all accounts is an incredibly accomplished scholar. She's an incredible college journalist and she's a great Aggie from what I hear." On August 3, Texas A&M confirmed that they reached a settlement with McElroy for $1 million.

Many have considered the debacle to be similar to the University of North Carolina at Chapel Hill's failed hiring of Nikole Hannah-Jones, after conservative criticism of her work on the 1619 Project.

=== Opposition by the board of regents ===
On August 3, 2023, the Texas A&M University System released an internal report with hundreds of documents that revealed that several administrators, members of the board of regents, were involved in the mishandled hiring of McElroy.

Jay Graham, a member of the board of regents wrote to David Baggett, another regent, "Kathy [Banks] told us multiple times the reason we were going to combine [the colleges of liberal] arts and sciences together was to control the liberal nature that those professors brought to campus" and "[W]e were going to start a journalism department to get high-quality conservative Aggie students into the journalism world to help direct our message. This won't happen with this type of hire!"

Graham also wrote "Please tell me this isn't true" and "But since it's not April Fools Day, I assume it is. I thought the purpose of us starting a journalism program was to get high-quality Aggie journalist[s] with conservative values into the market. This won't happen with someone like this leading the department."

Another regent, Mike Hernandez, wrote in an email to Banks and John Sharp, "Granting tenure to somebody with this background is going to be a difficult sell for many on the [board of regents]" and suggested they "put the breaks on this."

Hernandez also wrote, "While it is wonderful for a successful Aggie to want to come back to Texas A&M to be a tenured professor and build something this important from scratch, we must look at her résumé and her statements made an[d] opinion pieces and public interviews," "The New York Times is one of the leading main stream media sources in our country. It is common knowledge that they are biased and progressive leaning. The same exact thing can be said about the university of Texas. Yet that is Dr. McElroy's résumé in a nutshell."

== Career chronology ==
- 1983 The Bryan-College Station Eagle
- 1984 The Huntsville Item
- 1985-1987 Austin American-Statesman
- 1987-1989 Newsday
- 1989-1991 The National Sports Daily
- 1991-2011 The New York Times
- 2014-2016 Oklahoma State University
- 2016–present University of Texas at Austin
