= Bill McIlroy (footballer) =

Australian rules footballer (1883–1960)

Personal information
- Full name: William McIlroy
- Born: 24 November 1883; Ballarat East, Victoria
- Died: 18 August 1960 (aged 76); Middle Park, Victoria
- Original team: Essendon 'A'

Playing career^{1}
Years	Club	Games (Goals)
1913	University	3 (0)
- ^{1} Playing statistics correct to the end of 1913.

William McIlroy (24 November 1883 – 18 August 1960) was an Australian rules footballer who played with University in the Victorian Football League (VFL).

McIlroy's first senior level football appearance was in 1908 when he joined the Essendon Association team from the Public Service team. Five years later he obtained a clearance to University at the start of the 1913 VFL season and he made three VFL appearances.

A career public servant, McIlroy was appointed Secretary of Lands in 1933 and served in this role until his retirement in 1949.
