= Billy Zane =

American actor (born 1966)

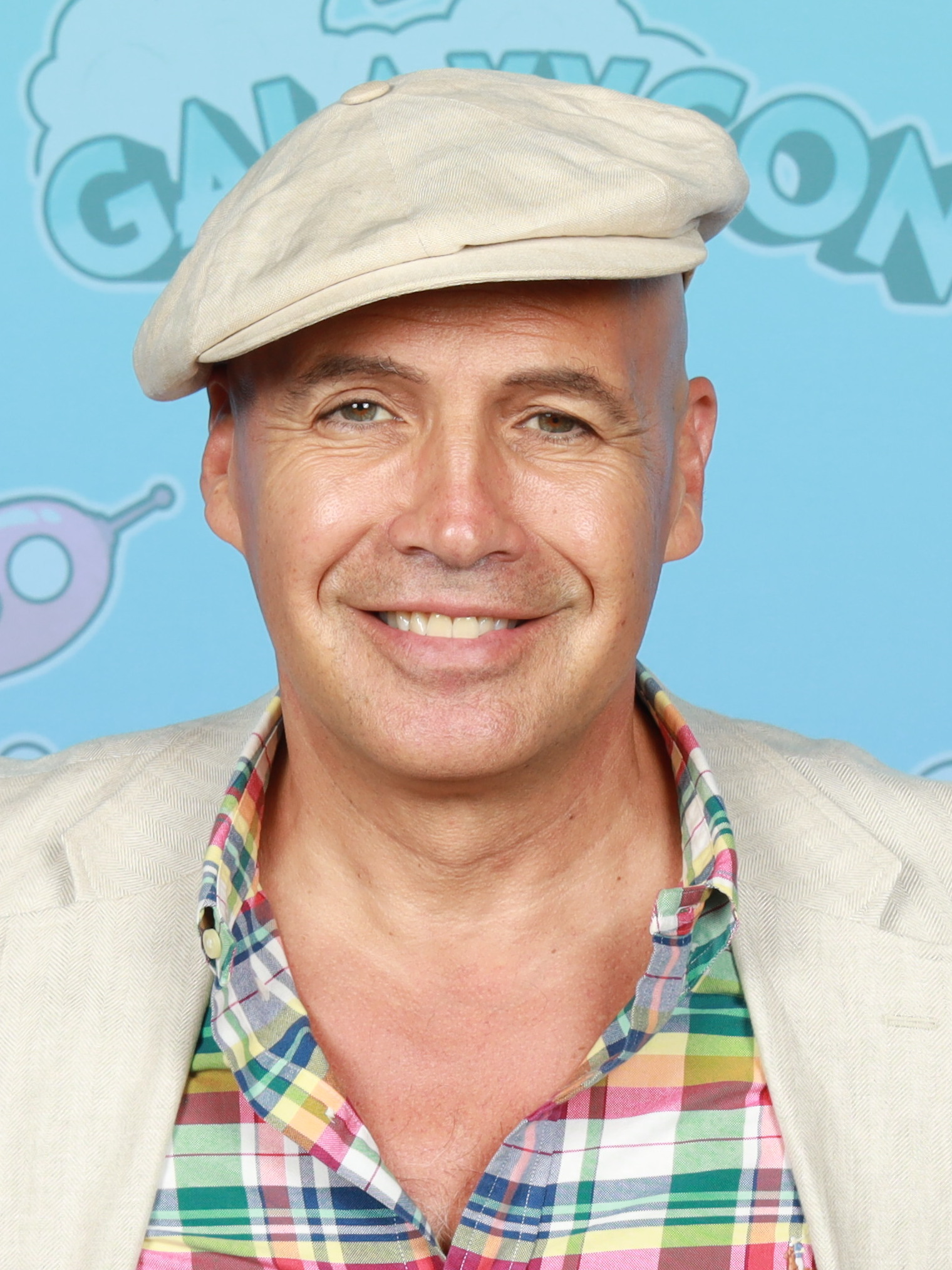
- Zane at GalaxyCon Raleigh in 2025
- Born: William George Zane Jr. February 24, 1966 (age 60); Chicago, Illinois, U.S.
- Occupation: Actor
- Years active: 1985–present
- Spouse: Lisa Collins (m. 1989; div. 1995)
- Partner: Candice Neill (2010–2022)
- Children: 2
- Family: Lisa Zane (sister)

William George Zane Jr. (born February 24, 1966) is an American actor. His breakthrough role was in the Australian film Dead Calm (1989), a performance that earned him a nomination for the Chicago Film Critics Association Award for Most Promising Actor. He has since appeared in numerous films and television series, and starred as the main antagonist Caledon Hockley in the epic film Titanic (1997), for which he and the rest of the ensemble cast were nominated for a Screen Actors Guild Award.

Zane's other film roles include Kit Walker / The Phantom in the superhero film The Phantom (1996), "Match" in the Back to the Future franchise, Lieutenant Val Kozlowski in Memphis Belle (1990), The Collector in Demon Knight (1995), Curtis Zampf in The Believer (2001), and Richard Miller in the Sniper film series. He also played the recurring role of John Justice Wheeler in the second season of the television series Twin Peaks, and provided the voice of Ansem in the video game Kingdom Hearts (2002).

== Early life ==
Zane was born in Chicago to Thalia and William George Zane Sr.; both were professional actors and founders of a school for medical technicians. His parents are of Greek descent (from Chios through his mother and Mani through his father); and his family's original surname, "Zanetakos", was anglicized to "Zane" by his parents. He grew up in the Greek Orthodox faith. He has an older sister, Lisa Zane, who is an actress and singer.

After completing a year of school at The American School in Switzerland (TASIS), Zane graduated from Francis W. Parker School and attended Harand Camp of the Theater Arts in Elkhart Lake, Wisconsin.

== Career ==
=== 1980s ===
Zane's first two screen roles were in the science fiction films Back to the Future in 1985 and Critters in 1986, around the same time he appeared in the music videos for Sheena Easton's songs "Do It For Love" and "Magic of Love". In 1988, he played Tony Gambini alongside Jessica Fletcher in Murder, She Wrote: A Very Good Year for Murder. Zane also appeared in an episode of Matlock entitled "The Nurse". In 1989, he reprised his henchman role in Back to the Future Part II. Earlier that same year, Zane gained international recognition with the role of villain Hughie Warriner in the thriller Dead Calm, alongside Nicole Kidman and Sam Neill. He also starred in the NBC film The Case of the Hillside Stranglers (1989), and Adam Sandler's "no budget" debut Going Overboard (1989) which was not released to a wider audience until 1996.

=== 1990s ===
Zane's first starring role was in a 1990 independent film, the low-budget science fiction thriller Megaville. In 1990, he also co-starred as the bombardier in the film Memphis Belle, a film version of a 1944 film about a World War II Boeing B-17 Flying Fortress bomber. Zane also forayed into television work, and in 1991 he appeared as John Justice Wheeler in several episodes of David Lynch's hit TV-series Twin Peaks. In 1992, Zane co-starred alongside Tilda Swinton in the film adaptation of Virginia Woolf's novel Orlando. In 1993, he played the Shakespearean actor "Mr. Fabian" in Tombstone and took a starring role in Sniper. Zane also starred alongside Mario Van Peebles as a cold-blooded and corrupt Colonel Graham in Posse and also in Lake Consequence and played a playboy named Harry, posing as the elusive, albeit fake Damon Bradley alongside Marisa Tomei and Robert Downey Jr. in Only You.

Zane also starred in a couple of Tales from the Crypt productions, including Tales From the Crypt Presents: Demon Knight, where he played a henchman of Satan called The Collector, and the episode "Well-Cooked Hams", where he played a poorly skilled magician who killed to steal good tricks from other magicians. In 1996, Zane played the eponymous classic comic book hero in the big budget action film The Phantom, based on Lee Falk's comic.

Zane played the snobbish millionaire misanthrope Caledon Hockley in James Cameron's 1997 blockbuster Titanic. This role as Rose's (played by Kate Winslet) fiancé earned him an MTV Movie Award nomination for "Best Villain" and a Blockbuster Entertainment Award. Along with the rest of the ensemble cast, he was nominated for a SAG award.

In 1998, Zane starred in and produced I Woke Up Early the Day I Died, a silent film based on Ed Wood's last script, intended as a parody on bad filmmaking. He won several awards at the B-Movie Film Festival, including Best Movie and Best Actor, for this work. The year after, he starred opposite Timothy Dalton, Bruce Payne, Sean Pertwee and Leonor Varela (who became his fiancé after shooting ended) in a miniseries about Cleopatra. Zane played the role of Mark Antony.

The same year, Zane voiced John Rolfe in Disney's Pocahontas II: Journey to a New World and Etrigan the Demon in an episode of The New Batman Adventures.

=== 2000s ===
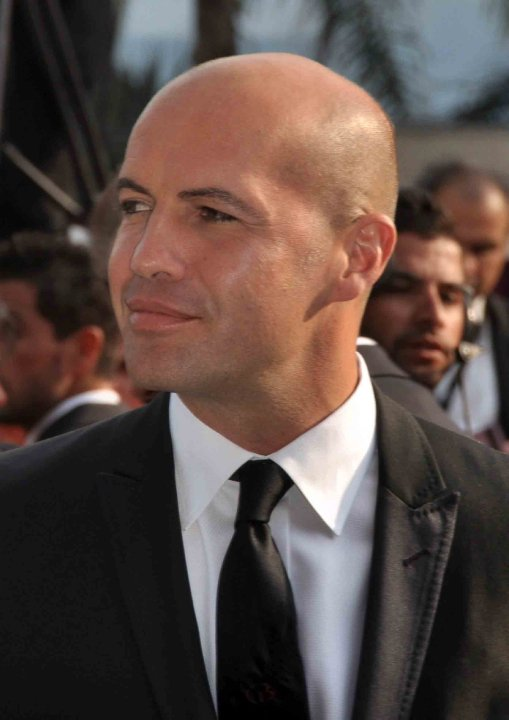
Billy Zane at the Cannes Film Festival, 2010

Zane appeared as neo-fascist Curtis Zampf in The Believer, which won the Grand Jury Prize at Sundance Film Festival in 2001. The same year, he also had a cameo as himself in the comedy Zoolander.

Zane appeared on Broadway in the musical Chicago, where he played lawyer Billy Flynn.

Zane also had a recurring role in the television series Charmed in which he played poetry-loving ex-demon Drake. He also provided the voice of Ansem, the main antagonist of the 2002 video game Kingdom Hearts, opposite Haley Joel Osment as Sora. Though archive audio of Zane was later used for Kingdom Hearts: Chain of Memories, he was replaced by Richard Epcar for the rest of the series from Kingdom Hearts II onwards. However, Zane's performance was kept for the Kingdom Hearts Final Mix remaster in Kingdom Hearts HD 1.5 Remix.

In 2006, Zane starred in Arthur Allan Seidelman's West End production of Six Dance Lessons in Six Weeks as an acerbic gay dance instructor opposite Claire Bloom. In the same year, he appeared in the Turkish film Valley of the Wolves: Iraq (Kurtlar Vadisi: Irak in Turkish), part of the Kurtlar Vadisi franchise. The film tells the story of the U.S. Army run amok in Iraq, eventually brought into check by a Turkish soldier. Zane plays Sam William Marshall, a cruel U.S. soldier who is the film's main antagonist.

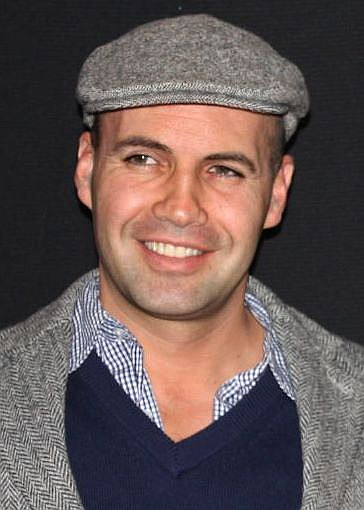
Zane in 2008

He took over Timothy Olyphant's role as Christina Applegate's ex-boyfriend on Samantha Who?. However, the sitcom was not renewed for the 2009–2010 season.

Zane is a principal at RadioactiveGiant, a film and television production and distribution company.

=== 2010s ===
Zane starred in the action/thriller film The Kill Hole (2012), and in January 2017 he appeared in a commercial for KFC as a gold-colored Colonel Sanders to pitch the restaurant chain's newest limited-time flavor, Georgia Gold Honey Mustard BBQ chicken. Zane also appeared in an episode of Community, season 6's "Advanced Safety Features".

=== 2020s ===
Zane was also featured in two episodes of The Boys portraying a fictional version of himself who made a movie with Popclaw and also attended a comic convention with Tara Reid. In season 3, Zane appeared as himself portraying Alastair Adana in the Vought film Not Without My Dolphin.

In 2024, Zane portrayed Larry Ray in the Lifetime film Devil on Campus: The Larry Ray Story as part of its "Ripped from the Headlines" feature films.

== Personal life ==
Zane was married to actress Lisa Collins from 1989 to 1995. He was also engaged for a time to Chilean actress Leonor Varela who was his co-star in the miniseries Cleopatra (1999).

Later Zane was engaged to British model-turned-actress Kelly Brook; he met her when they co-starred in the movie Survival Island (2005), also known as Three. They split in April 2008, got back together again shortly after that, and ended the relationship in August 2008. Zane dated Croatian model Jasmina Hdagha in 2010; they broke up later that year.

Through a friend, he met American model Candice Neill with whom he has two daughters; they became engaged. Their first daughter, Ava Catherine, was born in 2011, and their second daughter, Gia, was born in 2014. Zane revealed in 2022 that he had broken up with Neill some time prior, saying he has been "single for a while."

In 1999, Zane participated in the first Gumball 3000 rally, driving a 1964 Aston Martin DB5. He is an abstract expressionist painter and he has had many solo and group exhibitions.

== Other media projects ==
Zane executive-produced an album by bluesman Tim O'Connor that includes three songs from Dead Calm, in which Zane had one of the lead roles.

== Filmography ==
=== Film ===
Year	Film	Role	Notes
1985	Back to the Future	"Match"	
1986	Critters	Steve Elliot	
1989	Going Overboard	King Neptune	
1989	Dead Calm	Hughie Warriner	Nominated — Chicago Film Critics Association Award for Most Promising Actor
1989	Back to the Future Part II	"Match"	
1990	Megaville	CKS Agent Raymond Palinov / Jensen	
1990	Memphis Belle	Lieutenant Val Kozlowski	Nominated — Chicago Film Critics Association Award for Most Promising Actor
1991	Femme Fatale	Elijah	
1991	Blood and Concrete	Joey Turks	
1991	Millions	Maurizio Ferretti	
1992	Orlando	Shelmerdine	
1993	Sniper	NSC Agent Richard Miller	
1993	Posse	Colonel Graham	
1993	Poetic Justice	Brad	
1993	Tombstone	Mr. Fabian	
1993	Betrayal of the Dove	Jesse Peter	
1994	Reflections on a Crime	Colin	
1994	The Silence of the Hams	Jo Dee Fostar	
1994	Flashfire	Jack Flinder	
1994	Only You	Harry / False Damon Bradley	
1995	The Set-Up	Charles Thorpe	
1995	Demon Knight	The Collector	
1996	The Phantom	Kit Walker / The Phantom	
1996	Head Above Water	Kent	
1996	Danger Zone	Rick Morgan	Also co-producer
1997	This World, Then the Fireworks	Marty Lakewood	Also executive producer
1997	Titanic	Caledon Hockley	Blockbuster Entertainment Award for Favorite Supporting Actor – Drama; Nominated — Screen Actors Guild Award for Outstanding Performance by a Cast; Nominated — MTV Movie Award for Best Villain
1998	I Woke Up Early the Day I Died	The Thief	Also producer
1998	Susan's Plan	Sam Myers	
1998	Pocahontas II: Journey to a New World	John Rolfe	Voice; direct-to-video
1999	Promise Her Anything	George Putter	
2001	Zoolander	Himself	Uncredited cameo
2001	The Believer	Curtis Zampf	
2001	CQ	Mr. E.	
2001	Morgan's Ferry	Sam	Direct-to-video
2002	Claim	Roberto Bealing	
2002	Landspeed	Michael Sanger	
2003	Silent Warnings	Sheriff Bill Willingham	Direct-to-video
2003	Vlad	Adrian	
2003	The Kiss	Alan Roberts / Young Philip Naudet	Direct-to-video
2003	Starving Hysterical Naked	Jack	
2003	Imaginary Grace	Nero	
2004	Silver City	Chandler Tyson	
2004	Big Kiss	Billy	Also director and executive producer
2005	Dead Fish	Virgil	
2005	The Pleasure Drivers	Marvin	
2005	BloodRayne	Elrich	
2006	The Last Drop	Lieutenant Robert Oates	Direct-to-video
2006	Survival Island	Jack	
2006	Valley of the Wolves: Iraq	Sam William Marshall	
2006	Memory	Taylor Briggs	
2007	The Mad	Jason Hunt	
2007	Fishtales	Professor Thomas Bradley	Also co-producer
2007	Alien Agent	Tom Hanson / Saylon	Direct-to-video
2008	Perfect Hideout	Victor	
2008	The Man Who Came Back	Ezra	
2008	Love N' Dancing	Kent Krandel	
2009	Surviving Evil	Sebastian "Seb" Beazley	
2009	Evil: In the Time of Heroes	Prophitis Messenger	
2009	Darfur	Bob Jones	
2009	The Hessen Affair	Jack Durant	
2010	Magic Man	Darius	
2010	The Confidant	Monty	
2010	Enemies Among Us	Graham	
2011	The Roommate	Professor Roberts	
2011	Boop	Max Fleischer	Short film
2011	Sniper: Reloaded	NSC Agent Richard Miller	Direct-to-video
2011	Mercenaries	Colonel Torida	
2011	Flutter	Edwin "The Dentist"	
2011	Mysteria	The Producer	
2011	Lovemakers	Jake's Agent	
2011	Guido	Sid Shine	
2012	The Scorpion King 3: Battle for Redemption	King Talus	Direct-to-video
2012	Electrick Children	Paul McKnight	
2012	Mama, I Want to Sing!	Dillan	
2012	A Green Story	Greg Hutchins	
2012	Two Jacks	Max Faraday	
2012	The Kill Hole	Marshall	
2012	Border Run	Aaron Talbert	
2012	Dark Star Hollow	The Devil	
2013	The Employer	Alan	
2013	Blood of Redemption	Quinn Forte	Direct-to-video
2013	Come Find Me	Uncle	Short film
2014	Scorned	Kevin	
2014	The Ganzfeld Haunting	Father	
2014	HUVr	Himself	Short film
2014	Ghost of Goodnight Lane	Alan	
2014	Mining for Ruby	Professor Sam Goodwell	
2015	Zombie Killers: Elephant's Graveyard	Seiler	
2015	Billy Zane Thinks Zayn Tweets Are About Him	Himself	Short film
2015	West of Redemption	Hank Keller	
2015	Trouble Sleeping	Charles	
2016	A Winter Rose	Preston Holdsworth	
2016	Zoolander 2	Himself	
2016	Swing State	Governor Richard Sollow	
2016	Dead Rising: Endgame	Leo Rand	
2016	White Island	Leo	
2016	Sniper: Ghost Shooter	NSC Agent Richard Miller	Direct-to-video
2016	The Adventure Club	Langley	
2017	Sniper: Ultimate Kill	NSC Agent Richard Miller	Direct-to-video
2018	Samson	King Balek	
2018	Holmes & Watson	Himself	Cameo
2018	Blue World Order	Master Crane	
2019	Cliffs of Freedom	Christos	
2019	The Great War	Colonel Jack Morrison	
2020	Ghosts of War	Dr. Engel	Also executive producer
2020	Final Kill	Carl Riser	
2020	Guest House	Douglas Masters	
2020	Battle of the Bulge: Winter War	General Omar Bradley	Direct-to-video
2020	Centurion: The Dancing Stallion	Jeffrey Hall	
2021	The Believer	Dr. Benedict	
2021	Iké Boys	Newt Grafstrom	Also co-executive producer
2021	Rupture	Victor	
2022	Hellblazers	Joshua	
2023	Legend of Destruction	Simon bar Giora	Voice; English dub
2023	Centurion: The Dancing Stallion	Jeffrey Hall	
2023	The Oath	King Aaron	
2024	Waltzing with Brando	Marlon Brando	
2024	Tapawingo	Stoney Tarwater	
2025	Day of Reckoning	Butch Hayden	
2025	Deadly Vows	Detective Manny	
2026	Takeover	Gamal Akopyan	
TBA	Wekiwa †	Big Jim	Filming

=== Television ===
Year	Film	Role	Notes
1986	Brotherhood of Justice	Les	Television film
1986	Heart of the City	Tobin	Episode: "Don't Sell Yourself to the Cannibals"
1987	Matlock	Eric Dawson	Episode: "The Nurse"
1987	Conspiracy: The Trial of the Chicago 8	Police Officer	Television film
1988	Crime Story	Frankie "The Duke" Farantino	Episode: "Protected Witness"
1988	Murder, She Wrote	Tony Gambini	Episode: "A Very Good Year for Murder"
1988	Police Story: Monster Manor	Officer Don Varney	Television film
1989	The Case of the Hillside Strangler	Kenneth Bianchi	Television film
1991	Twin Peaks	John Justice Wheeler	5 episodes
1993	Lake Consequence	Billy	Television film
1993	Running Delilah	Paul	Television film
1993	Tales from the Crypt	Miles	Episode: "Well-Cooked Ham"
1998	The New Batman Adventures	Jason Blood / Etrigan the Demon	Voice; episode: "The Demon Within"
1999	Cleopatra	Mark Antony	2 episodes
2000	Sole Survivor	Joe Carpenter	Television film
2000	Hendrix	Michael Jeffrey	Television film
2001	The Diamond of Jeru	Mike Kardec	Television film
2001	Invincible	Os	Television film
2001	Boston Public	Matthew Baskin	4 episodes
2004	Bet Your Life	Joseph	Television film
2005	Charmed	Drake	3 episodes
2008	Finnegan	Brian Clark	Pilot
2009	Blue Seduction	Mikey Taylor	Television film
2009	Samantha Who?	Winston Funk	5 episodes
2010	Journey to Promethea	King Laypach	Television film
2010	The Deep End	Cliff Huddle	6 episodes
2012	Red Clover	Sheriff Connor O'Hara	Television film
2012	Hannah's Law	Lockwood	Television film
2012	Robot Chicken	Commander Edwards, King Ding Dong	Voice; episode: "Poisoned by Relatives"
2012	Barabbas	Barabbas	Television film
2014	Checked Out	Uncle Dennis	Pilot
2014	Psych	Ian Collins	Episode: "The Break-Up"
2015	The Wheel of Time: The Winter Dragon	Elan Morin Tedronai / Ishamael	Television film; also executive producer
2015	Community	Honda Boss	Episode: "Advanced Safety Features"
2015–2016	Mad Dogs	Milo	2 episodes
2016	Guilt	Stan Guthrie	10 episodes
2017	Legends of Tomorrow	P. T. Barnum	Episode: "Freakshow"
2018	Deception	"Switch"	2 episodes
2019	Curfew	"Joker" Jones	8 episodes
2019, 2022	The Boys	Himself	3 episodes
2021	True Story	Ari	2 episodes
2021	MacGruber	Brigadier Commander Enos Queeth	5 episodes
2024	Devil On Campus: The Larry Ray Story	Larry Ray	Television film
2025	Krapopolis	Potluckus	Voice; "Basket Baby"
2026	Stick	Peter Crane	

=== Video games ===
Year	Film	Voice role	Notes
2001	SSX Tricky	Broderick "Brodi" Ford	
2002	Kingdom Hearts	Ansem	
2013	Kingdom Hearts HD 1.5 Remix	Ansem	Archival audio; Kingdom Hearts Final Mix only
2017	Kingdom Hearts HD 1.5 + 2.5 Remix	Ansem	Archival audio; Kingdom Hearts Final Mix only

=== Music videos ===
Year	Song	Artist	Role
1985	"Do It For Love & Magic of Love"	Sheena Easton	Unknown
1998	"The Dope Show"	Marilyn Manson	Recording Industry Executive
2001	"Epiphany"	Staind	Unknown
2013	"Rock n Roll"	Avril Lavigne	Protagonist / Antagonist / BearShark
2023	"I'm My Only Friend"	Dillon Francis, Arden Jones	Actor
