= Christina Cole =

English actress (born 1982)

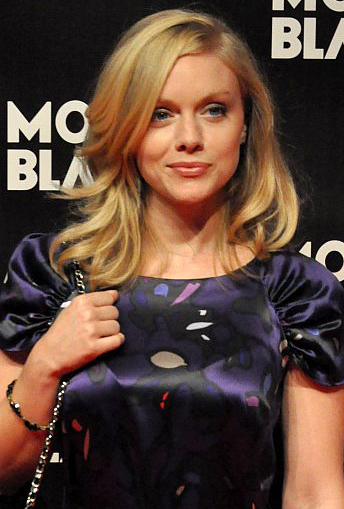
- Cole in September 2010
- Born: 8 May 1982 (age 44); London, England
- Education: Oxford School of Drama
- Occupation: Actress
- Years active: 2002–present
- Children: 2

Christina Cole (born 8 May 1982) is an English actress known for portraying Cassie Hughes in the Sky One supernatural television series Hex.

== Early life ==
Born in London, Cole is the eldest of three siblings. She has a sister, Cassandra, and a brother, Dominic. Her mother is a telecentre manager and her father is a driving instructor. Cole trained at the Oxford School of Drama, graduating in 2002.

== Career ==
Cole won the role of Clarissa Payne in What a Girl Wants (2003), while still at drama school. She graduated early to begin filming. She was then cast as Juliet in a production of Romeo and Juliet at Clwyd Theatr Cymru.

Cole's first lead role was that of Cassie Hughes in Hex. She played the role for the whole of the first season and the first three episodes of the second. Upon her departure, the character was killed off. Co-star Jemima Rooper has stated that the reason for Cole's exit from the series was that she wanted to move on.

After leaving Hex, Cole went on to appear as Blanche Ingram in the critically acclaimed BBC television serial Jane Eyre and guest starred as Lilith in the Doctor Who episode "The Shakespeare Code". She provided an audio commentary for the episode on the DVD release of the series' third series alongside David Tennant.

Other roles include a small part in the James Bond film Casino Royale (2006), as the receptionist at the Ocean Club Hotel in Nassau, Bahamas, and Diana Mann in the pilot episode of Cane, Cole's first appearance on American television. She has also appeared as Mel on the ITV sitcom Sold, as Jenny Walker in The Deaths of Ian Stone (2007), and as Charlotte Warren in Miss Pettigrew Lives for a Day (2008).

Cole once again played alongside Jemima Rooper as Caroline Bingley in Lost in Austen.

In 2009, Cole played Dr. Sarah King in Poirot: Appointment with Death. In 2009, Cole was cast in the lead role for a failed pilot prepared for Fox about a brilliant surgeon who endures adult-onset schizophrenia. That same year she also appeared in the films Surviving Evil and Doghouse.

In 2012, Cole appeared in a music video for Cheyenne Jackson's "Before You".

Since 2015, Cole has portrayed Dr. Paula Agard on a recurring basis in the USA Network series Suits, and appeared in an episode of the NBC series The Blacklist. The same year she also portrayed Mrs Sprot in the BBC's Partners in Crime series, in two episodes adapting Agatha Christie's N or M?.

In 2016, Cole opened at the Playhouse Theatre as Stevie in the world premiere of Matthew Perry's play The End of Longing.

== Filmography ==
=== Film ===
Year	Title	Role	Notes
2003	What a Girl Wants	Clarissa Payne	
2006	Casino Royale	Catherine, Ocean Club Receptionist	
2007	The Deaths of Ian Stone	Jenny Walker	
2008	Miss Pettigrew Lives for a Day	Charlotte Warren	
2009	Doghouse	Candy	
2009	Surviving Evil	Phoebe Drake	
2010	Close Up	Woman	Short
2011	Blitz	WPC	
2012	Before You	Woman	Short
2013	Mutual Friends	Beatrice	
2015	Jupiter Ascending	Gemma Chatterjee	
2025	My Fault: London	Bethen	

=== Television ===
Year	Title	Role	Notes
2002	The Project	Lizzie	Television film
2003	Foyle's War	Violet Davies	Episode: "Among the Few"
2003	All About Me	Sarah	2 episodes
2004	He Knew He Was Right	Nora Rowley	Miniseries, 4 episodes
2004	Agatha Christie's Marple	Lettice Protheroe	Episode: "The Murder at the Vicarage"
2004–05	Hex	Cassandra 'Cassie' Hughes	Lead role, 9 episodes
2005	Julian Fellowes Investigates: A Most Mysterious Murder	Rose Harsent	Episode: "The Case of Rose Harsent"
2006	Jane Eyre	Blanche Ingram	Miniseries, 4 episodes
2007	Doctor Who	Lilith	Episode: "The Shakespeare Code"
2007	Sea of Souls	Rebecca Muir	2 episodes: "The Prayer Tree: Parts 1 & 2"
2007	Cane	Diana Mann	Episode: "Pilot"
2007	Sold	Mel	6 episodes
2007	Comedy Showcase: Ladies and Gentlemen	Elizabeth	Television film
2008	Lost in Austen	Caroline Bingley	Miniseries, 4 episodes
2008	Agatha Christie's Poirot	Sarah King	Episode: "Appointment with Death"
2009	Maggie Hill	Maggie Hill	Television film
2009	Emma	Mrs. Augusta Elton	Miniseries, 2 episodes
2010	Human Target	Princess Victoria of Wales	Episode: "Victoria"
2010	Midsomer Murders	Sarah Sharp	Episode: "The Silent Land"
2011	CHAOS	Adele Ferrer	Main role, 13 episodes
2011	Breakout Kings	Lilah Tompkins	Episode: "Queen of Hearts"
2011	Lewis	Claire Gansa	Episode: "The Mind Has Mountains"
2011	Time Machine: Rise of the Morlocks	Angela	Television film
2013	Silent Witness	Janice Masters	Episode: "True Love Waits" (2 parts)
2013	Second Sight	Gemma	Television film
2014	The Assets	Louisa Tilton	Miniseries, 8 episodes
2014	Rosemary's Baby	Julie	Miniseries, 2 episodes: "Night One" & "Night Two"
2015	Partners in Crime	Mrs. Sprot	3 episodes: "N or M?: Parts 1, 2 & 3"
2015	New Tricks	Carmen Creswell	Episode: "The Russian Cousin"
2015	The Blacklist	Alice	Episode: "The Djinn" (No. 43)
2015	Lumen	Jaime Hartman	Television film
2015–18	Suits	Dr. Paula Agard	Recurring role, 17 episodes
2017	SS-GB	Mrs. Sheenan	Miniseries, 4 episodes
2017	The Indian Detective	Robyn "Bob" Gerner	Miniseries, 4 episodes
2018	Innocent	Louise Wilson	Miniseries, 4 episodes
2020	Van der Valk	Heidi Berlin	Episode: "Death in Amsterdam"
2021	Grantchester	Joan Beaumont	Episode: "Series 6 Episode 2"
2022	The Window	Harriet Saratova	Main role, 10 episodes
2020-2022	Strike	Izzy Chiswell	Recurring role, 6 episodes
2023	The Crown	Interviewer	Episode: Series 6, Episode 9: 'Hope Street'
2025	Father Brown	Dame Lydia Adams	Season 12, episode 5: "The Cup of Calabria"

=== Video games ===
Year	Title	Role	Notes
2017	Warhammer 40,000: Dawn of War III	Eldar (voice)	
2017	The Surge	Additional voices (voice)	
2018	Vampyr	Carol / Loretta / Sabrina & others (voices)	
2018	Call of Cthulhu	Sarah Hawkins & others (voices)	
2021	It Takes Two	Additional voices (voice)	
2023	Final Fantasy XVI	Anabella Rosfield (voice)	
2023	Alan Wake II	Alice Wake	

== Theatre ==
- Romeo and Juliet, Theatr Clwyd, October 2002 to November 2002 (playing Juliet)
- The Tempest, Pegasus Theatre, February 2003 (role unknown)
- The Lightning Play, Almeida Theatre, November 2006 to January 2007 (playing Tabby Morris)
- The Magistrate, National Theatre, 14 November 2012 to 10 February 2013 (playing Charlotte). Streamed live to cinemas across the UK.
- The End of Longing, Playhouse Theatre, February 2016 to May 2016 (playing Stevie)
