= Thomas Michael Sullivan =

American film producer

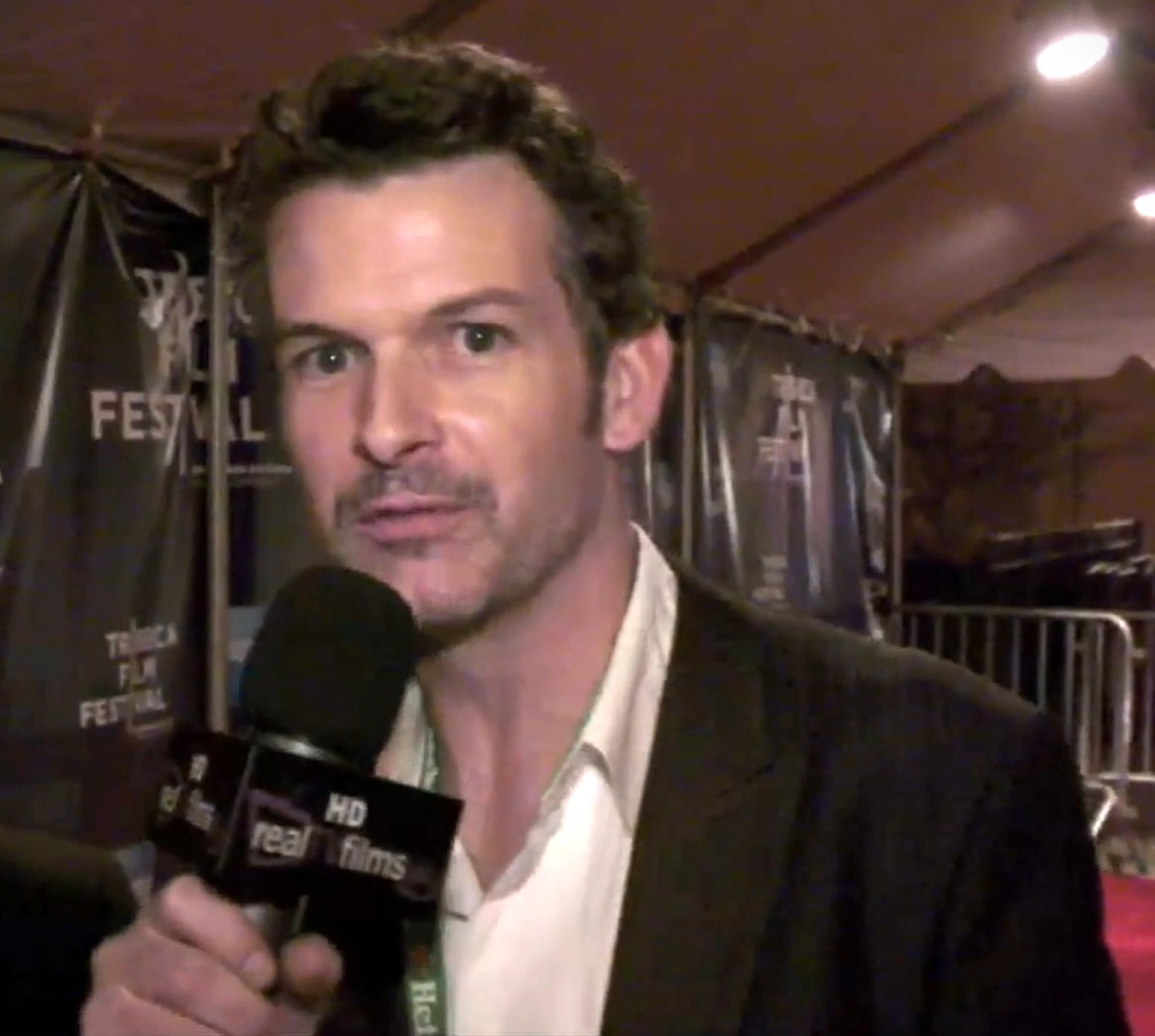
Sullivan in 2009

Thomas Michael Sullivan is an American actor, producer, and founding member of Stage13. He is executive producer of The Deertrees Theatre Festival now in its 10th year, bringing New York productions to the Lakes Region of Maine every August. Thomas has produced over 30 Equity showcases. Off-Broadway production credits include The Voyage of the Carcass by Dan O'Brien. In 2008, he joined as executive producer with London producers Rotozazza and The Foundry Theatre NYC to present Etiquette as part of The Public Theater’s Under the Radar Festival. He started Studio13, a film production company, about to release the9tthdot, an interactive web series, and Hysterical Psycho, a feature horror film written and directed by Dan Fogler. He originated and still produces "...a little bit louder", a weekly NYC poetry series that has won two National Slam Championships.

== Theater ==
- American Clock by Arthur Miller
- Sight Unseen by Donald Marguiles
- Dr. Cooks Garden by Ira Levin
- Misery by Stephen King
- Someone Who'll Watch Over Me by Franj McGuinnes
- Cobb by Lee Blessing
- Line by Israel Horovitz
- Brilliant Traces by Cindy Lou Johnson
- Danny & The Deep Blue Seas by John Patrick Shanley
- Nuts & Bolts
- Love Letters by A.R. Gurney
- Sean in Kylenamoe
- Spare Tongues
- Voyage of the Carcass by Dan O'Brien

== Filmography ==
Film
Year	Film	Producer	Role	Notes
1999	The Thomas Crown Affair	No	Museum Special Police	
2002	Maid in Manhattan	No	Paparazzi	
2006	Slippery Slope	No	Waiter	
2006	Saturday	Yes	—N/a	
2007	Perfect Stranger	No	Reebok executive	
2009	Hysterical Psycho	Yes	Christopher	Also co-producer
2011	A Novel Romance	co-producer	Bartender	
2012	The Owner	Yes	—N/a	
2012	Finding Cody	Yes	—N/a	
2014	Don Peyote	Yes	—N/a	

Television
Year	Film	Producer	Role	Notes
2010	M'larky	Yes	Costillo	appears in two episodes

== Production ==
- Deertrees Theatre Festival
- Stage13
- Greenlight TheatreWorks
- 13th Street Repertory
- LoveCreek Productions
