= Elisabeth Harnois =

American actress

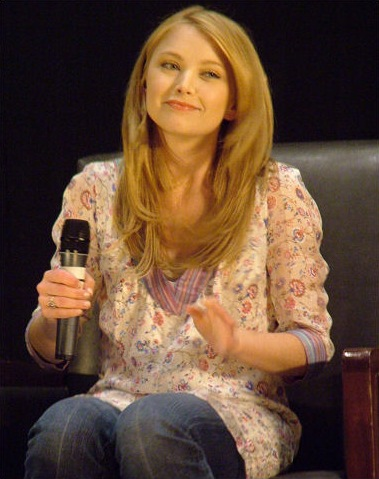
- Harnois in July 2006
- Born: 1979 or 1980 (age 46–47); Detroit, Michigan, U.S.
- Education: Wesleyan University
- Occupation: Actress
- Years active: 1985–present

Elisabeth Harnois (/ɑːrnˈwɑː/ arn-WAH; born 1979 or 1980) is an American actress. Her career started at the age of five when she began appearing in a number of film and television roles. As a child, she starred as Alice in Disney's Adventures in Wonderland and as an adult, she starred as Morgan Brody in CSI: Crime Scene Investigation from 2011 to 2015.

== Life and career ==
=== Early life ===
Harnois was born in Detroit, Michigan, to a hairstylist mother and a computer programmer father. She was raised in Los Angeles. She is the eldest of five children with four younger brothers. She attended St. Mel's School in Woodland Hills and Canyon Springs High School in Moreno Valley, California, and graduated from Wesleyan University with a degree in film studies in 2001.

=== Career ===
Harnois appeared in two films at the age of five, One Magic Christmas and Where Are the Children?. She did commercials until landing the role of Emily in Timeless Tales from Hallmark and the role of Alice in the 1992 Disney Channel series Adventures in Wonderland. In 1998, she appeared in My Date with the President's Daughter alongside Will Friedle and Dabney Coleman as part of The Wonderful World of Disney. In 2005, she starred in the short-lived Fox teen mystery/supernatural/horror drama Point Pleasant as Christina Nickson, and also landed a role opposite Evan Rachel Wood in the black comedy/satirical film Pretty Persuasion, portraying the best friend of Wood's character.

In May 2011, Harnois guest-starred in the long-running CBS police procedural drama CSI: Crime Scene Investigation in Season 11, episode 21, titled "Cello and Goodbye", as Morgan Brody, a CSI from the L.A.P.D. Scientific Investigation Division. In September that same year, when the twelfth-season premiere, called "73 Seconds" aired, Harnois was added to the main cast, wherein her character transfers to the Las Vegas Crime Lab. Harnois remained on the show until it ended in September 2015 with the two-hour series finale titled "Immortality".

=== Awards and nominations ===
Harnois was nominated in 1987 for the Young Artist Award at the Young Artist Awards for Exceptional Performance by a Young Actress Starring in a Feature Film in Comedy or Drama for One Magic Christmas (1985) and again in 1988 for Best Young Actress Guest Starring in a Television Drama for Highway to Heaven (1987) for the episode "Man's Best Friend". She won the same award in 1993 for Outstanding Performer in a Children's Program for Adventures in Wonderland (1992).

== Filmography ==
=== Film ===
Year	Title	Role
1985	One Magic Christmas	Abbie Grainger
1986	Where Are the Children?	Missy Eldridge
1998	My Date with the President's Daughter	Hallie
1999	Façade	Kate
2003	Swimming Upstream	Julie Sutton
2005	Strangers with Candy	Monica
2005	Pretty Persuasion	Brittany
2007	Ten Inch Hero	Piper
2007	Solstice	Megan / Sophie
2008	Keith	Natalie Anderson
2008	Chaos Theory	Jesse Allen
2009	A Single Man	Young Woman
2011	Mars Needs Moms	Ki (voice role)
2011	Bad Meat	Rose Parker
2013	Riddle	Holly Teller
2014	Don Peyote	Eve
2018	The Work Wife	Lisa
2019	Skin in the Game	Sharon
2023	Falling for the Manny	Alice

=== Television ===
Year	Title	Role	Notes
1987	Highway to Heaven	Jenny Raines	Episodes: "Man's Best Friend: Parts 1 & 2"
1987	Beauty and the Beast	Little Girl	Episode: "A Children's Story"
1988–1990	Fantastic Max	Zoe Young	Voice role; main role
1989	Judith Krantz's Till We Meet Again	Young Freddy	Television miniseries
1990	Timeless Tales from Hallmark	Emily	Main role
1990	Midnight Patrol: Adventures in the Dream Zone	Rosie	Voice role; main role
1992–1995	Adventures in Wonderland	Alice	Lead role
1993	The Fresh Prince of Bel-Air	Steffi	Episode: "Will Goes a Courtin'"
1995	Heavens to Betsy	Angeline	Unaired TV pilot
1995	The Client	Leigh-Ann	Episode: "The Burning of Atlanta"
1995	Boy Meets World	Missy Robinson	Episode: "The Last Temptation of Cory"
1995–1996	Unhappily Ever After	Patty McGurk	3 episodes
1997	Brotherly Love	Carly	Episode: "Skin Deep"
1998	The Warlord: Battle for the Galaxy	Maggi Sorenson	Television film; also known as The Osiris Chronicles
1998	My Date with the President's Daughter	Hallie Richmond	Television film
1999	Two Guys and a Girl	Translator	Episode: "Au Revoir Pizza Place"
2000	Charmed	Brooke	Episode: "Magic Hour"
2000–2001	All My Children	Sarah Livingston	Recurring role
2005	Criminal Minds	Trish Davenport / Cheryl Davenport	Episode: "Broken Mirror"
2005	Point Pleasant	Christina Nickson	Lead role
2006	CSI: Miami	Jill Gerard	Episode: "Darkroom"
2006–2007	One Tree Hill	Shelley Simon	Recurring role; 6 episodes
2007	Cold Case	Janey Davis (1963)	Episode: "Boy Crazy"
2008	Dirt	Milan Carlton	Episode: "Dirty, Slutty Whores"
2008	Without a Trace	Erin MacNeil / Erin McMillan	Episodes: "Closure", "Live to Regret"
2008–2009	90210	The Blonde Blended	Episodes: "That Which We Destroy", "Love Me or Leave Me"
2010	Miami Medical	Dr. Serena Warren	Main role
2011–2015	CSI: Crime Scene Investigation	Morgan Brody	Main role (seasons 12–15); 87 episodes
2014	A Christmas Kiss II	Jenna	Television film
2017	My Baby Is Gone!	Emily Jones	Television film; also known as My Baby Gone
2018	Psycho Ex-Girlfriend	Kara Spencer	Television film; also known as Twisted
2018	The Christmas Contract	Lilly	Television film
2018	Christmas Cupid's Arrow	Holly Willinger	Television film; also known as The Christmas Cupid
2019	Best Christmas Ball Ever	Amy	Television film; also known as Christmas in Vienna
2026	Cruel Love	Julia	Television film
