= Michelangelo Sosnowitz =

American music composer

Michelangelo Sosnowitz is an American music composer. His works include ballet, musical theater, electronic and popular music, as well as commercial, television and film. His feature film scores include A Novel Romance, winner Best Film at the NYC International Independent Film Festival, the Dan Fogler directorial debut Hysterical Psycho, the Deborah Kampmeier films Split and Tape (music by), the Julia Verdin films Lost Girls and Maya, the Steve Feder film A Brooklyn Love Story and the Deborah Twiss film trilogy Sapiosexual, Taboo and Crave, and her original streaming series Crazytown. He also wrote the music to the Colin Quinn series Cop Show. His original ballet 'Petrouchka' won Best Choreography at NYMF 2010. He wrote the opening theme music to The History Channel show Battles BC and original theme music for ENTV, Deadline Hollywood BlackTreeMedia and other PMC programming. Original Off-Broadway musicals include Crazy Head Space and Love in the Middle Ages.

== Career ==
Michelangelo began playing the piano at the age of five. His first published music happened in High School for a PBS Documentary called Oysters in the Long Island Sound. Also while in High School, Michelangelo won the Connecticut Songwriting Competition for his song Standing in the Snow. Michelangelo went to the Berkshire Theatre Festival and wrote songs and score for the Children's Theater. Michelangelo attended New York University studying at the Tisch School of the Arts and began composing music for student films, winning Best Score at the First Run Film Festival for the film Soldier Boy and for the film Spirit. As a composer Michelangelo wrote music for pop/rock bands featured on Satellite radio and Internet radio as well as numerous television commercials ranging from Animal Planet, Acuvue, Mercedes-Benz, Tervis Tumbler, Garnier Fructis Cinnamon Toast Crunch and Street King (drink). Michelangelo also wrote extensive music for CONCACAF including their Champion's League theme and Gold Cup theme as well as stingers and promos.

== Original Theater/Musicals ==
- "Crazy Head Space" (created and co-composed by Elisabeth Davis, lyrics by Elisabeth Davis; directed by Errickson Wilcox and Gabriel Barre)
- "Love in the Middle Ages" (book and lyrics by Eric Kornfeld; directed by Lisa Shriver)
- "Peking Roulette" (written by Ben Thompson; winner- best score Midtown International Theater Festival)

== Discography ==
Albums

Michelangelo

- In The Beginning (self release, 1999)
- Future Perfect (Two Shes Productions, 2004)

Rabbits Against Magic

- Daylight (No Means Yes Productions, 2007)

Michelangelo Sosnowitz

- Petrouchka (No Means Yes Productions, 2010)

Logan Tracey

- For Sale (No Means Yes Productions, 2013)

Connor Reed

- Looking For (Lemon Shark Productions, 2016)

Nat Lopez

- Nat Lopez (Lemon Shark Productions, 2016)

Singles

The Glamazons

- Movie Star (Lemon Shark Productions, 2014)

Connor Reed

- Looking For (Lemon Shark Productions, 2015)

Xan

- Sorry For Myself (Lemon Shark Productions 2018)

Xan

- Already Missing You (Lemon Shark Productions 2019)

Xan

- Let You Love Me (Lemon Shark Productions 2021)
