= Weeds (short story) =

- Short story by Stephen King
- Country: United States
- Language: English
- Genre: Horror short story sci-fi

Publication
- Publisher: Cavalier
- Media type: Print (Paperback)
- Publication date: May 1976

"Weeds" (also known as "The Lonesome Death of Jordy Verrill") is a darkly humorous short story by Stephen King. It was first published in Cavalier magazine in May 1976.

== Plot summary ==
On Independence Day, a backwoods hick farmer in New Hampshire named Jordy Verrill thinks his newfound discovery of a meteorite will provide enough riches to pay off the remaining $200 (equivalent to $1,132 in 2025) of his bank loan, but instead finds himself overcome by a rapidly spreading plant-like organism that arrives in the meteorite when he ends up coming in contact with it. It is mentioned that Jordy doesn't have much good luck.

After a rainstorm, Jordy sees that the organism has grown roundish grass around where the meteorite struck. Not only are the plants growing on anything he touches that is wet, but there are also plants growing on his fingers, his left eye, his penis, and his tongue, where he starts to get itchy. He can't go to his usual doctor, who is out of town on a fishing trip. Upon hearing the words "cold water" in his mind, Jordy gives in to the temptation and takes a bath to relieve the itching caused by the growing plants; however, the water only serves to accelerate the plants' growth on his body.

The next day, Jordy now resembles a plant creature with a roundish head with no visible neck and round shoulders. He can even hear the plants (that are now on his property) talking. Loading his shotgun, Jordy kills himself, saying he's "lucky at last". The grass continues to grow across his property and is making its way into the nearby town.

== Publication ==
"Weeds" was first published in Cavalier in May 1976. In April 1979, it was reprinted in Nugget. In 2013, it was included in the anthology Shivers VII, edited by Richard Chizmar. In 1979, King revised the story. In 2020, "Weeds" was included in a deluxe edition of Night Shift published by Cemetery Dance Publications, which says it is now out of print.

== Adaptations ==
The story was adapted into the second segment of the anthology film Creepshow in 1982. The segment was titled "The Lonesome Death of Jordy Verrill", a reference to the Bob Dylan song "The Lonesome Death of Hattie Carroll". Stephen King himself plays Verrill in the adaptation, and the location of Verrill's farm is changed to Maine. The story includes Verrill's humorous daydreams about trying to sell the meteor to an imagined "Department of Meteors" at the community college and his decision not to seek medical attention, as he fears a doctor (portrayed by Bingo O'Malley) would amputate his fingers. Plant growth affects everything Jordy touches. As Jordy prepares a bath to soothe his itchy skin, the plants are covering his hands, jawline, chest, back, and an area that causes Jordy to declare, "Oh no, not there!" He is then visited by the ghost of his father (also portrayed by Bingo O'Malley), who appears in his mirror and warns him not to get in the tub as it is the water that the plants want. Believing he is doomed anyway, Jordy gives in. Over several hours, Jordy is transformed into a plant creature. He kills himself with a shotgun. A radio forecaster predicts long periods of rain and sunshine as the camera pans across Jordy's farm, now overrun with monstrous vegetation as some of it is starting to go down the road.

A comic book adaptation of Creepshow, including "The Lonesome Death of Jordy Verrill", was published in 1982 with art by Bernie Wrightson.

== See also ==
- Stephen King short fiction bibliography
