= Charissa Chamorro =

American actress

Charissa Cree Chamorro (born April 26, 1977, in Baytown, Texas) is a US clinical psychologist of Chilean heritage, Assistant Clinical Professor of Psychiatry at the Icahn School of Medicine at Mount Sinai, specializing in the treatment of anxiety, depression and sleep-related issues. She is also an actor and American television personality.

== Medical career ==
Chamorro completed clinical training at Columbia University Clinic for Anxiety and Related Disorders (CUCARD), Children's Day Unit at New York State Psychiatric Institute, Mount Sinai Center for OCD and Related Disorders and Mount Sinai Adolescent Health Center.

Chamorro received her PhD in Clinical Psychology from Long Island University, earned a master's degree in Social Work from New York University, a master's degree in psychology from Long Island University, and received her Bachelor of Fine Arts degree from Boston University.

Chamorro is a frequent media contributor and her expertise has been featured in Time, Forbes, Parents, People, Real Simple, The Week, Insider, Men's Health, Vox, the Huffington Post and Newsweek.

She has presented her research at conferences nationwide, and has been awarded fellowships in research and statistics. She has contributed to research on pediatric OCD and anxiety disorders, and has researched on the long-term effects of child abuse and exposure to community violence, and on the identification of factors that contribute to anxiety and mood disorders.

She was a featured contributor on NBC's Doc to Doc with Dr. John Torres. She has also worked with advocacy and social service programs throughout New York City. Her work as a movement instructor for pediatric cancer patients inspired her to pursue a career as a clinical psychologist with a specialty in child and adolescent psychology. Chamorro is a mentor at Psicológos Latinos Avanzando Nuestros Servicios (PLANS) where she supports the growth and success of Latino undergraduate and post-baccalaureate students interested in becoming licensed psychologists.

== Acting career ==
Her television and film career includes leading roles on such soap operas as Guiding Light as Tory Granger (2001–2002) and One Life to Live as Sophia Pellegrino (1999–2001), for which she won the 2001 OLTL Soap Central Award for Outstanding Supporting Actress and Outstanding Newcomer. Charissa starred in the feature film Hysterical Psycho, had guest starring roles on Law & Order and Law & Order: Criminal Intent, and has worked extensively in theater.

== Filmography ==
| Year | Title | Role | Notes |
|---|---|---|---|
| 2009-2010 | As the World Turns | Myra Haft | Recurring |
| 2009 | Hysterical Psycho | Ally | Starring |
| 2008 | The Marconi Bros. | Mindy | Supporting |
| 2007 | Law & Order: Criminal Intent | Sandy Del Gado | Episode: "Rocket Man" |
| 2007 | Manhunt 2 | Mrs. Lamb | Voice and Performance Capture |
| 2003 | Law & Order | Kay Hartley | Episode: "Mother's Day" |
| 2001-2002 | Guiding Light | Victoria "Tory" Granger | Series regular |
| 2001 | Harry Potter and the Sorcerer's Stone | Loop Group | US version |
| 2000 | Search Party | Celebrity Contestant | 4 episodes "Puerto Rico" |
| 1999-2001 | One Life to Live | Sophia Pellegrino | Series regular |
