= Hysterical Psycho =

- Film poster
- Directed by: Dan Fogler
- Written by: Dan Fogler
- Produced by: Thomas Michael Sullivan
- Starring: Randy Baruh; Noah Bean; Kelly Hutchinson; Charissa Chamorro; Nicholas DeCegli; Kate Gersten
- Cinematography: Mario Ducoudray
- Edited by: Jacob Gentry
- Music by: Michelangelo Sosnowitz
- Production company: Studio 13
- Distributed by: Indican Pictures
- Release date: April 24, 2009 (Tribeca)
- Running time: 73 minutes
- Country: United States
- Language: English

Hysterical Psycho is a 2009 American horror comedy film written and directed by Dan Fogler. It stars Randy Baruh, Noah Bean, Kelly Hutchinson, Charissa Chamorro, Nicholas DeCegli, and Kate Gersten as a group of friends who encounter "lunar radiation" that causes people to go insane.

== Plot ==
A theater troupe from New York City visit a secluded area known as Moon Lake. Unknown to them, the cabin in which they stay is located on a Native American burial ground among other sites. In addition, it is the location of a lunar meteorite that has bathed the area in radiation that causes people to go violently insane.

== Cast ==
- Randy Baruh as Lenny
- Noah Bean as Chuck
- Kelly Hutchinson as Cindy
- Charissa Chamorro as Ally
- Nicholas DeCegli as the giant
- Kate Gersten as Sara
- Lennon Parham as deaf mute sister
- Sarah Saltzberg as Jo
- Ariel Shafir as Steve
- Thomas Michael Sullivan as Christopher

Gilbert Gottfried and writer-director Dan Fogler appear in cameos.

Cast of Hysterical Psycho in 2009

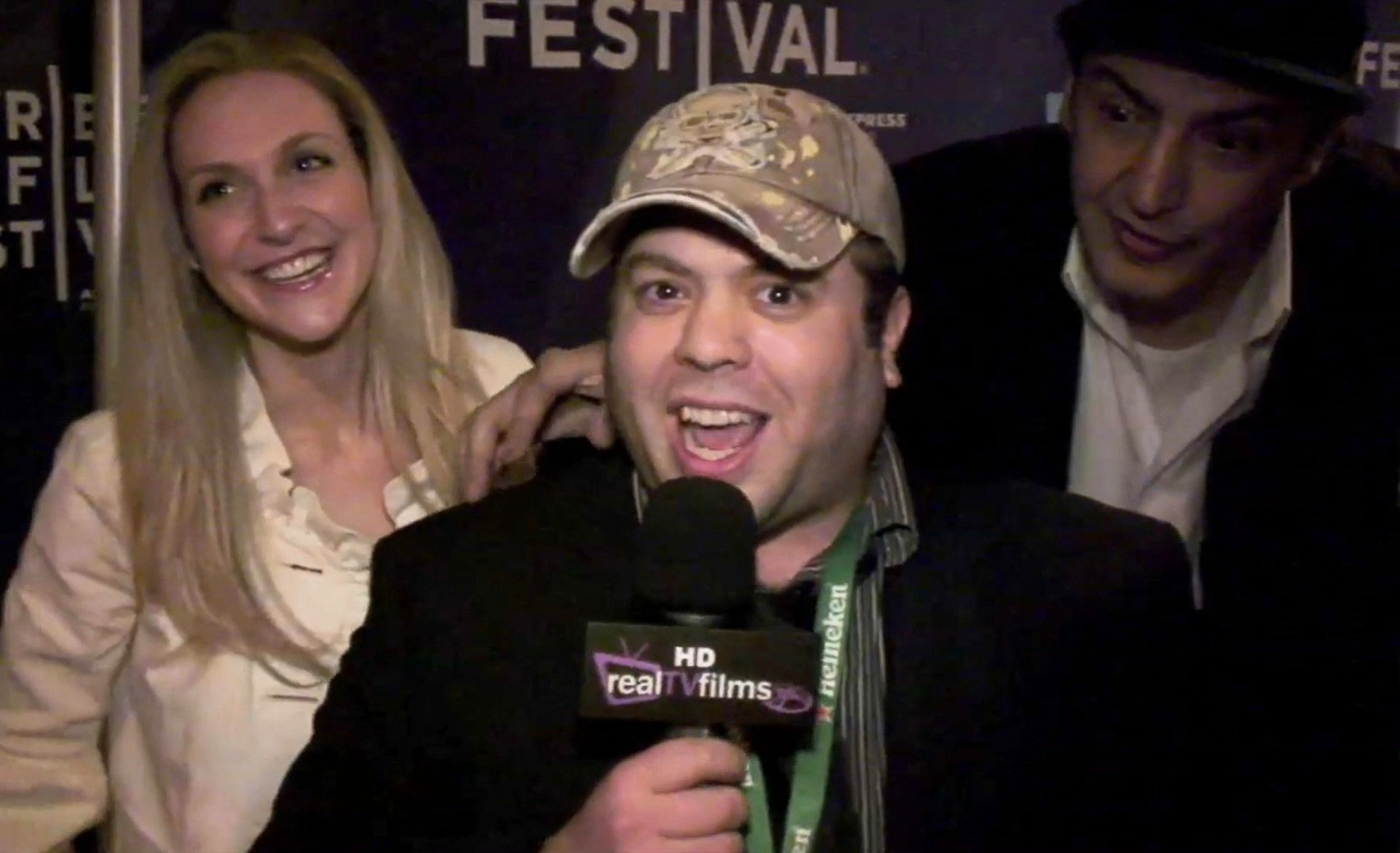
Dan Fogler (Kate Gersten and Nicholas DeCegli in background)

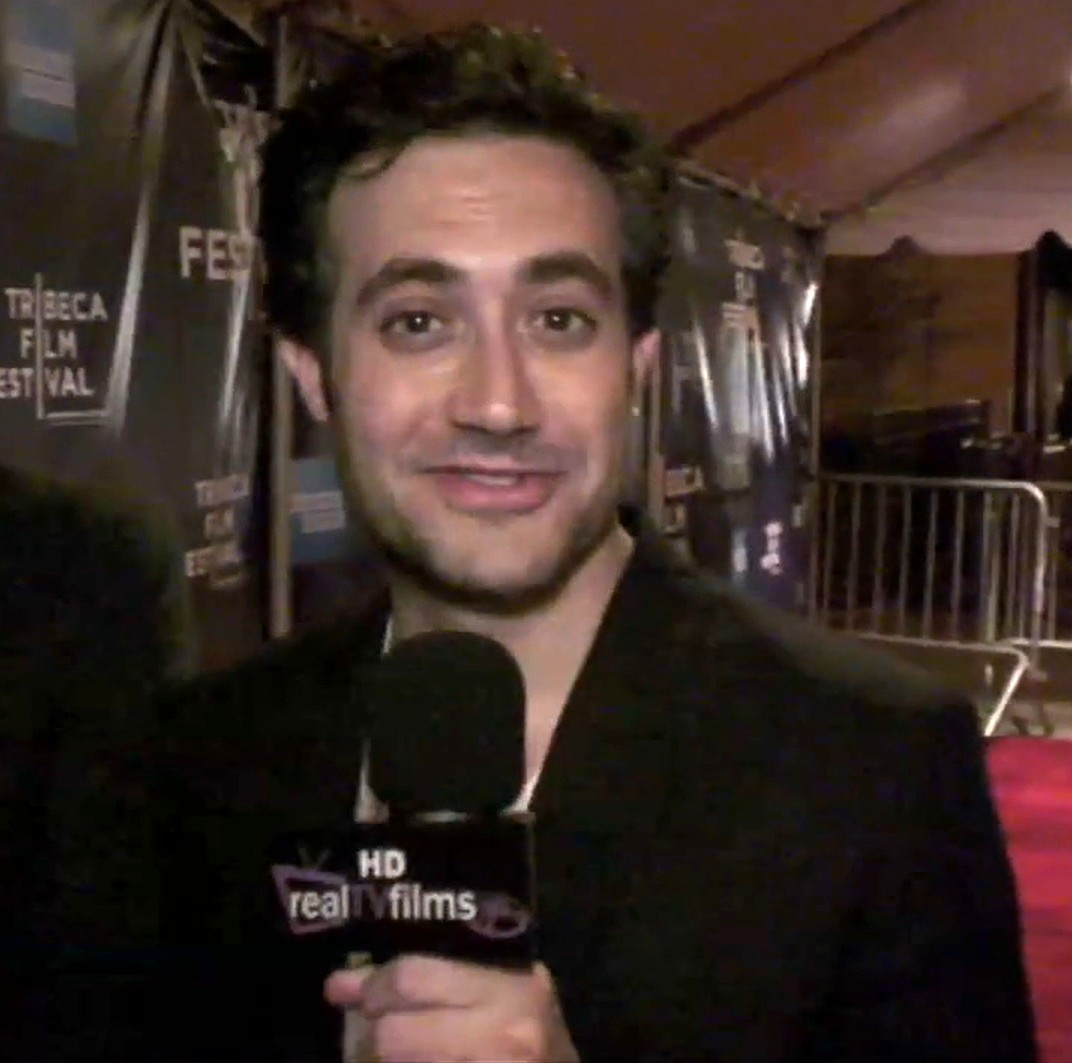
Randy Baruh

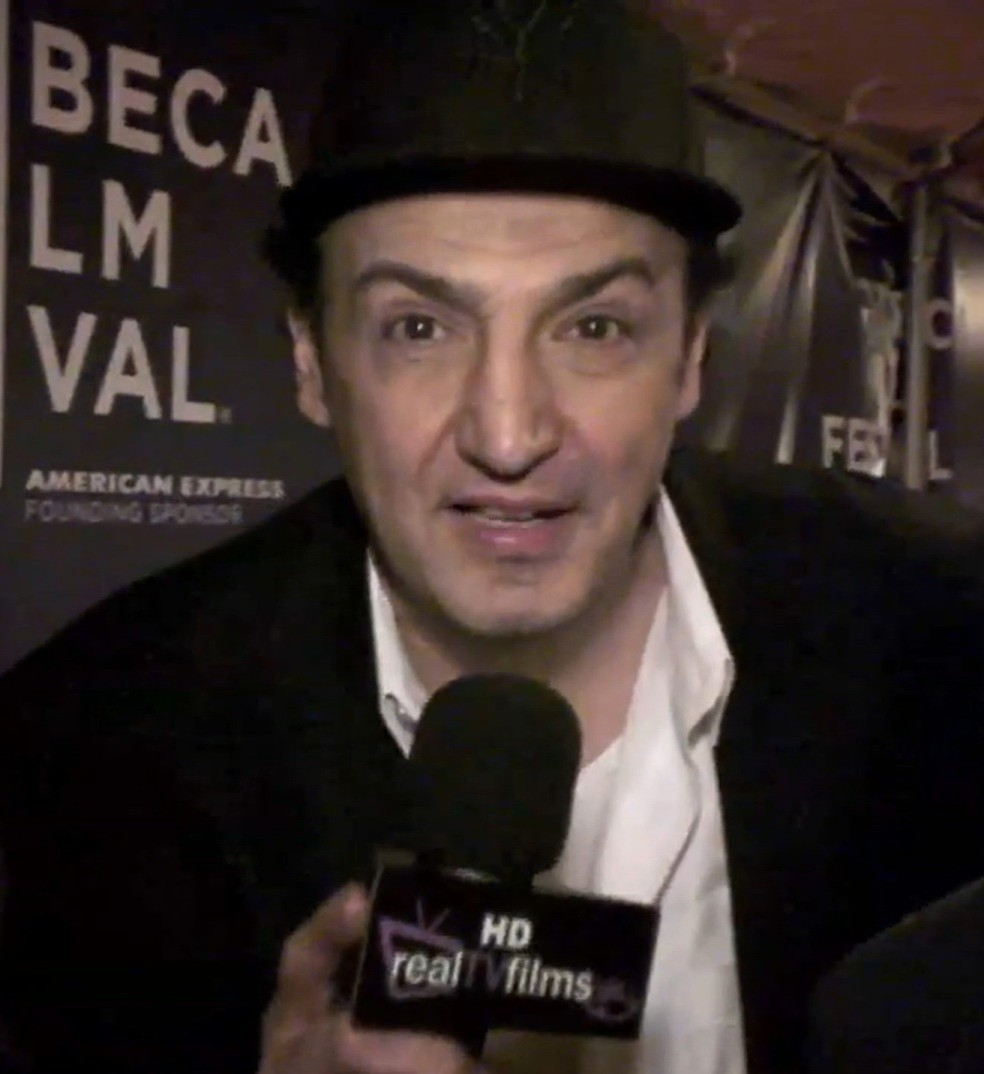
Nicholas DeCegli

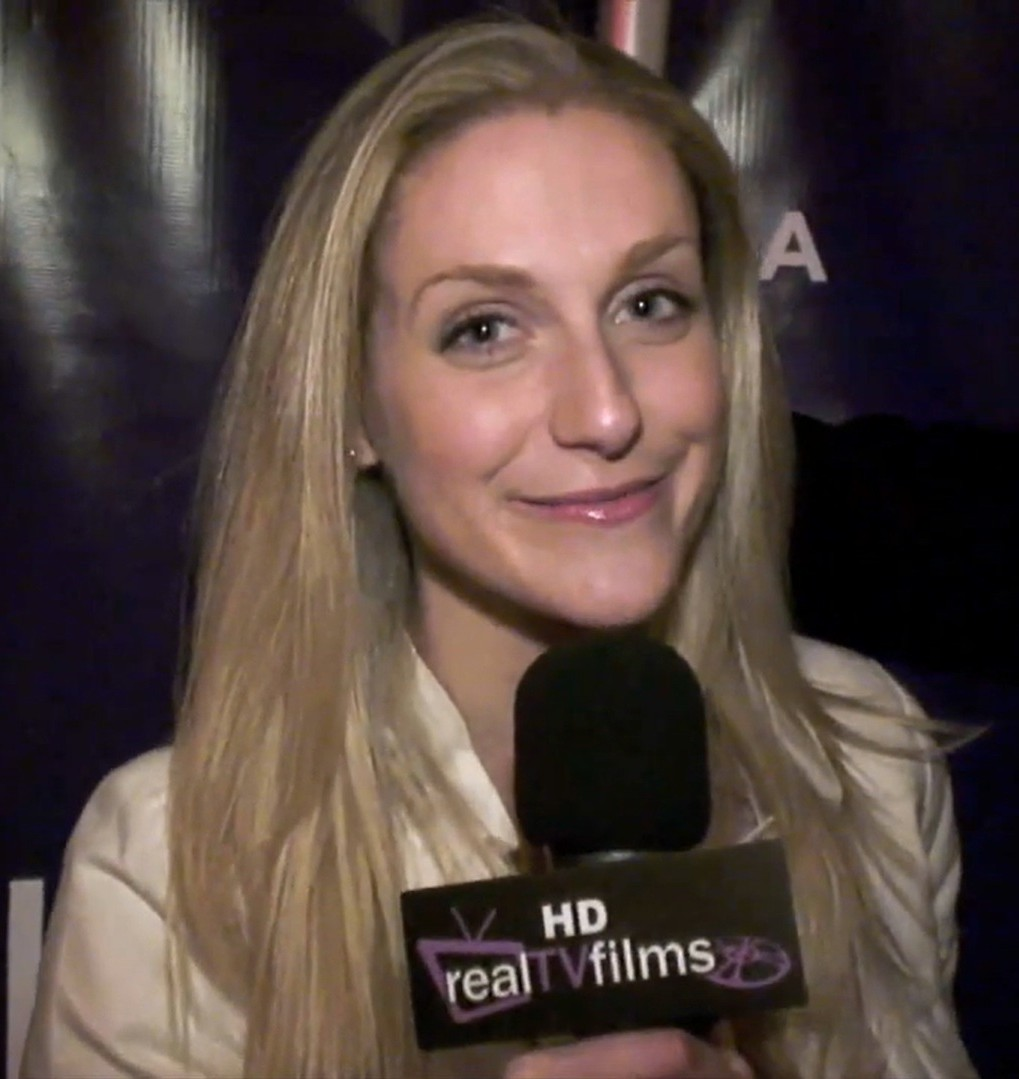
Kate Gersten

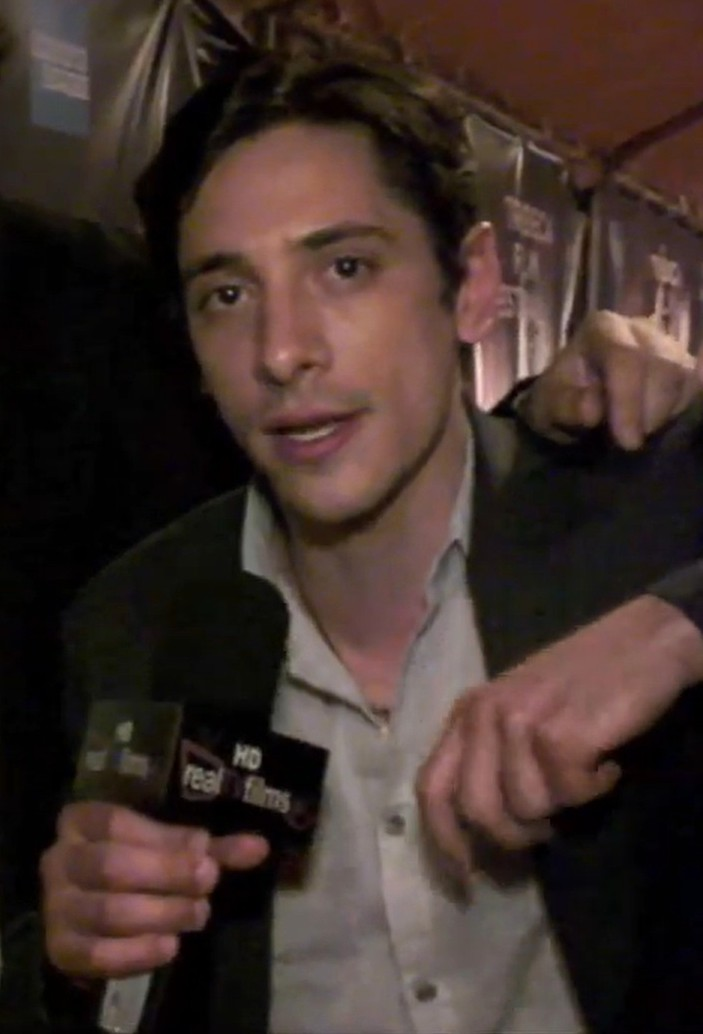
Ariel Shafir

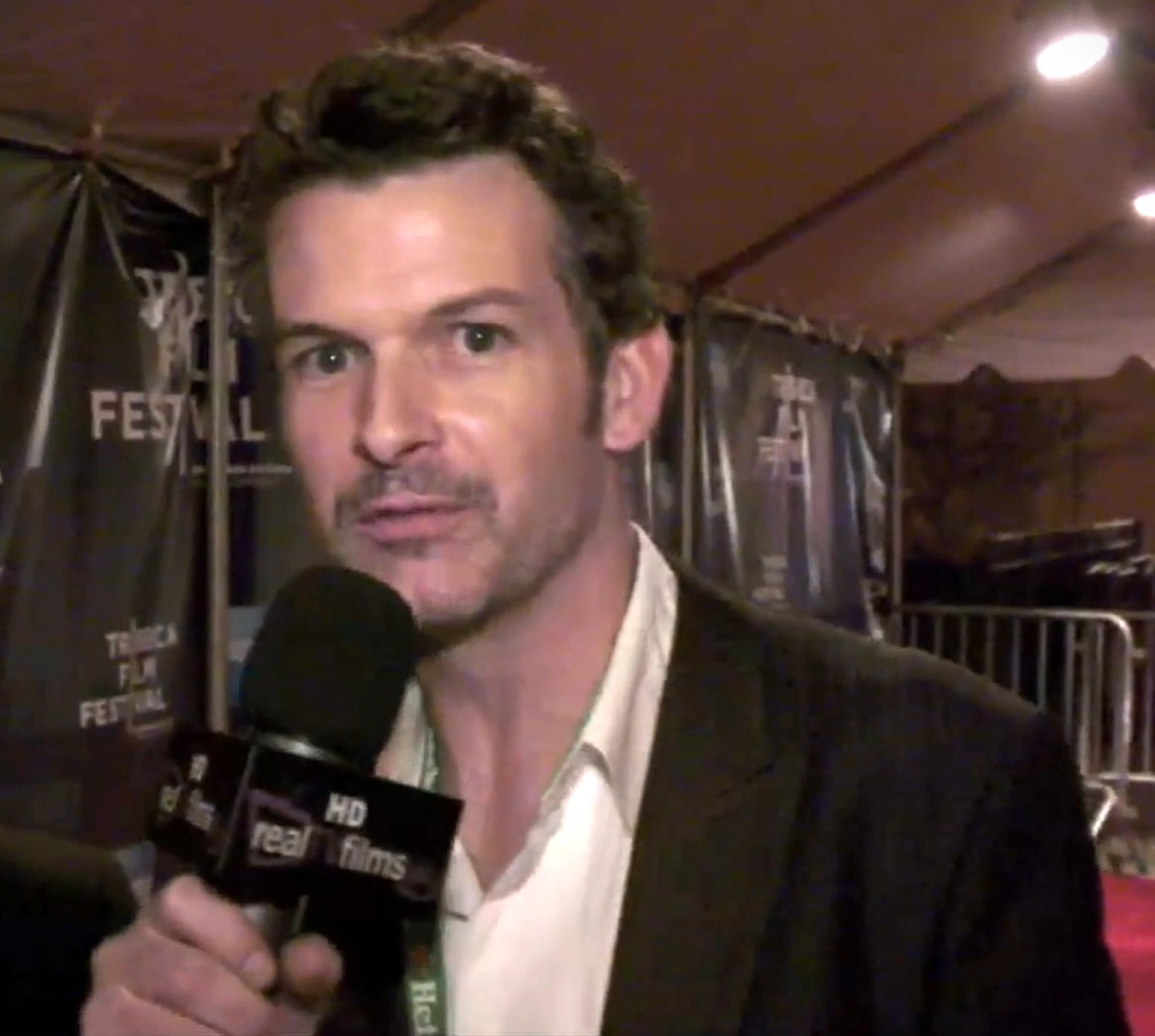
Thomas Sullivan

== Release ==
Hysterical Psycho premiered at the Tribeca Film Festival. Indican released it on DVD in the US on February 18, 2014.

== Reception ==
John Anderson of Variety wrote that it was probably more fun to make than it is to watch, as horror films have already parodied themselves at length. Bloody Disgusting rated it 4.5/5 stars and wrote, "Hysterical Psycho is by far one of the most absurd films I’ve ever admitted to loving." Mark L. Miller of Ain't It Cool News compared it to Student Bodies and wrote, "There are moments that will definitely make you laugh, but in between those guffaws, I found myself mostly impressed by the intensity and creativity of the scares."
