= Mars Needs Moms =

2011 film by Simon Wells

- Theatrical release poster
- Directed by: Simon Wells
- Screenplay by: Simon Wells; Wendy Wells
- Based on: Mars Needs Moms! by Berkeley Breathed
- Produced by: Robert Zemeckis; Jack Rapke; Steve Starkey; Steven Boyd
- Starring: Seth Green; Dan Fogler; Elisabeth Harnois; Mindy Sterling; Joan Cusack
- Cinematography: Robert Presley
- Edited by: Wayne Wahrman
- Music by: John Powell
- Production companies: Walt Disney Pictures; ImageMovers Digital
- Distributed by: Walt Disney Studios; Motion Pictures
- Release dates: March 6, 2011 (El Capitan Theatre); March 11, 2011 (United States)
- Running time: 88 minutes
- Country: United States
- Language: English
- Budget: $150 million
- Box office: $39.2 million

Mars Needs Moms is a 2011 American animated science fiction comedy film, co-written and directed by Simon Wells. Based on the Berkeley Breathed book, the film was animated through the process of performance capture and stars Seth Green, Dan Fogler, Elisabeth Harnois, Mindy Sterling, and Joan Cusack. It tells the story of a nine-year-old boy named Milo who sets out to save his mother on Mars after she is taken by Martians.

Mars Needs Moms premiered at the El Capitan Theatre in Los Angeles on March 6, 2011, and was released in theaters on March 11, 2011 by Walt Disney Studios Motion Pictures. The film received mixed reviews from critics and was a box office failure, grossing $39 million on a $150 million budget, and losing an estimated $100–144 million for Disney.

== Plot ==
Unbeknownst to humans, a technologically sophisticated society of Martians lives below the surface of Mars. Their Supervisor, while observing Earth, sees a mother persuading her son, Milo, to do his chores. The Martians decide to bring her to Mars, where her "mom-ness" will be extracted and implanted into the next generation of nanny-bots.

After being grounded for feeding broccoli to the cat, Milo upsets his mother by sarcastically stating that his life would be better without her. When he goes to apologize, he finds his mother being abducted by the Martians and stows away on their spaceship. On Mars, Milo is taken to a prison cell but escapes. While being pursued by the Supervisor's henchmen, he follows a voice that tells him to jump down a chute and lands in a lower level. There, he sees a trash-covered landscape that is inhabited by furry creatures.

Milo is whisked away by the creatures to meet Gribble, also known as George Ribble, the adult human who told him to jump down the chute. Gribble explains that the Martians plan to extract the memories of Milo's mom at sunrise, using a process that will kill her. Gribble, who is lonely and does not want Milo to leave, pretends to help Milo find his mother. His plan goes awry, leading to Gribble being captured and Milo being chased by the Supervisor's henchmen. Milo is rescued by Ki, one of the supervisors who raise Martian babies.

He returns to Gribble's home but finds him missing. Gribble's robotic spider, Two-Cat, takes Milo to the Martian compound where Gribble is being prepared for execution. Milo is captured by his henchmen, but Ki tosses him a laser gun, allowing him to escape. Milo and Gribble retreat to a lower uninhabited level, where Gribble describes his own mom's abduction and murder by the Martians twenty years before. Milo convinces Gribble to help him just as Ki finds them. They discover an ancient mural of a Martian family and realize that Martian children were not always raised by machines. Martian female babies are currently raised by nanny-bots, while the male babies are sent below to be raised by adult male Martians, the furry creatures.

Milo, Gribble, and Ki save Milo's mom before sunrise, causing the energy of the extraction device to short out the electronic locks to the control room. This lets the adult males and babies enter and run amok, attacking the guards and robots. Milo and his mom steal oxygen helmets and try to escape across the Martian surface. The Supervisor, while attempting to kill them, causes Milo to trip, and his helmet shatters. Milo's mom gives him her own helmet, saving Milo but causing herself to suffocate in Mars's air. The Martians are awed, as this is the first time they have seen love. Gribble finds his own mother's helmet and gives it to Milo's mom, saving her. Ki brings a ship for them to escape in, and the henchmen arrest the Supervisor, deciding that they now prefer the loving vision of family life.

Milo, his mom, Gribble, Ki, and Two-Cat travel back to Earth. Gribble decides not to stay because he wants to pursue a relationship with Ki on Mars. Milo and his mom return home just before his dad arrives.

== Cast ==
- Seth Green (performance capture) and Seth Dusky (voice) as Milo, a 9-year-old boy who has a strained relationship with his mother
- Dan Fogler as George "Gribble" Ribble, a man-child human who lives beneath Mars and befriends Milo
- Elisabeth Harnois as Ki, an English-language-knowing Martian who defects from the Supervisor and teams up with Milo and Gribble
- Mindy Sterling as The Supervisor, the owner and ruler of the Martians who seek to capture children's moms, extract their "mom-ness", and implant it into nanny-bots
- Joan Cusack as Milo's mother, who has a strained relationship with her son and is taken away by Martians
- Kevin Cahoon as Wingnut, a male Martian and one of Gribble's friends
- Dee Bradley Baker as Two-Cat (voice), Gribble's bug-like robot assistant
- Tom Everett Scott as Milo's father
- Raymond, Robert and Ryan Ochoa as Martian Hatchlings
- Matthew Henerson, Adam Jennings, Stephen Kearin, Amber Gainey Meade, Aaron Rapke, Julene Renee, Kirsten Severson, and Matthew Wolf as Martians

== Production ==
Simon Wells had known Robert Zemeckis since the mid-1980s, having worked on Who Framed Roger Rabbit (1988), Back to the Future Part II (1989), Back to the Future Part III (1990), and The Polar Express (2004). The production designer was Doug Chiang, and the supervising art director was Norm Newberry. The title of the film (and to an extent, the source material) is a twist on the title of American International Pictures' 1966 film Mars Needs Women.

The filmmakers came up with their own alien language. In developing the language, all of the actors spent a day where they recorded different interpretations of a list of words; the producers picked their favorite interpretations from that recording and put them in a book documenting the fictional language for the actors to speak.

Elisabeth Harnois stated in an interview that she and the cast were given scenarios by Wells to which they acted out responses in improvised Martian language.

Seth Green described doing the performance-capture as physically demanding work: "A lot of running, jumping, falling, hitting, spinning. I wore a harness for, like, 85 percent of the movie. It was uncomfortable." After spending six weeks outfitted in a special sensor-equipped performance capture suit while simultaneously performing Milo's lines, Seth Green's voice sounded too mature for the character and was dubbed over by that of 12-year-old newcomer Seth R. Dusky.

For the auditions, Kevin Cahoon performed two scenes, including the ending; he recalled the instructions saying, "create your Martian language and play the scene." He previously played Ed, another non-speaking role, in the Broadway musical version of The Lion King (1994): "it's almost like silent film. You have to speak with your heart and soul and face, and you have to act as if you have dialogue with everyone else. I think that's where you find the humanity, or the martiananity, of the character." Cahoon's mannerisms were also used for the other martians. Mars Needs Moms is Cahoon's first time collaborating with Dan Fogler since the two worked with each other in New York stage theater. As he described his opinion on the film, "I was blown away. It's beautiful. The technology is incredible and the IMAX is awesome. I was so impressed with the score, but also the heart. I got misty-eyes towards the end with the mom/Milo relationship. I thought it really connected in a wonderful way and am so honored to be a part of it."

In 2020, Brie Larson revealed via YouTube that she had auditioned for the character Ki, who was eventually portrayed by Elisabeth Harnois.

== Release ==
Mars Needs Moms was released in theaters on March 11, 2011. The film's premiere was held at the El Capitan Theatre in Los Angeles on March 6, 2011.

=== Home media ===
Mars Needs Moms was released on Blu-ray, Blu-ray 3D, DVD, and movie download on August 9, 2011. The release is produced in three different physical packages: a four-disc combo pack (Blu-ray, Blu-ray 3D, DVD, and "Digital Copy"); a two-disc Blu-ray combo pack (Blu-ray and DVD); and a single-disc DVD. The "Digital Copy" included with the four-disc combo pack is a separate disc that allows users to download a copy of the film onto a computer through iTunes or Windows Media Player software. The film is also a movie download or On-Demand option. All versions of the release (except for the On-Demand option) include the "Fun with Seth" and "Martian 101" bonus features, while the Blu-ray 2D version additionally includes deleted scenes, the "Life On Mars: The Full Motion-Capture Experience" feature, and an extended opening film clip. The Blu-ray 3D version also has an alternate scene called "Mom-Napping", a finished 3D alternate scene of the Martian abduction of Milo's mom.

== Reception ==
=== Box office ===
Mars Needs Moms was considered by analysts to be a box-office bomb, and the biggest financial loss for a Disney-branded film. It grossed $1,725,000 on its first day, and its opening weekend earnings added up to $6,825,000. Overall, the film debuted in fifth place behind Battle: Los Angeles, Rango, Red Riding Hood and The Adjustment Bureau. This is the 64th-lowest opening ever for a film playing in 3,000+ theaters. Adjusted for inflation, considering the total net loss of money (not the profit-to-loss ratio), it is the fourth-largest box office failure in history. In 2014, the Los Angeles Times listed the film as one of the most expensive box-office disasters of all time. On March 14, 2011, Brooks Barnes of The New York Times commented that it was rare for a Disney-branded film to perform so badly, with the reason for its underperformance being the premise, the animation style, and negative word of mouth on social networks, along with releasing it on the same week as Battle: Los Angeles which had more hype with the general movie goers. Barnes concluded, "Critics and audiences alike, with audiences voicing their opinions on Twitter, blogs and other social media, complained that the Zemeckis technique can result in character facial expressions that look unnatural. Another common criticism was that Mr. Zemeckis focuses so much on technological wizardry that he neglects storytelling."

=== Critical response ===
On the review aggregator website Rotten Tomatoes, 34% of 111 critics' reviews are positive, with an average rating of 5/10. The website's consensus reads: "The cast is solid and it's visually well-crafted, but Mars Needs Moms suffers from a lack of imagination and heart." Metacritic, which uses a weighted average, assigned the film a score of 49 out of 100, based on 22 critics, indicating "mixed or average" reviews. Audiences polled by CinemaScore gave the film an average grade of "B" on an A+ to F scale.

The Sydney Morning Herald labeled the motion-capture animation superior to Avatar (2009), and while noting the story had "pure Disney cheese", Wells "thankfully know[s] precisely when to inject action and humour when the mush-o-meter approaches the red."

Some critics favorably compared the set design to Tron: Legacy (2010), including Tim Grierson of Screen Daily, who opined that the motion-capture "improved significantly since the days of The Polar Express." He also spotlighted the film's attempt at a "tonal divide", as it has both comic sequences typical for a kids film and themes about sacrifice. However, he criticized the "chaotic" story and two "irksome" protagonists: Milo, whose voice actor "overdoes the character's whiny anxiousness to the point that it's hard to root for him;" and Gribble, a "predictably wisecracking sidekick". Us Weekly also panned the characters: "[Milo] makes a whiny hero, and Dan Fogler (as his buddy on Mars) fails to amuse. Plus, why is Milo's stay-at-home mom a saint and the working alien moms evil?"

The Hollywood Reporter praised Mars Needs Moms's motion-capture visuals, but analogized its story as too much like a Disneyland ride and also called it "odd [...] how a movie meant to glorify moms is so riddled with anti-feminist concepts." Time Out New York called it not that much different from other children's science fiction movies: "After the novelty of these backgrounds and comin'-at-ya bits wears off, Mars Needs Moms has to rely on Fogler's obnoxious Jack Black Jr. shtick, a weak subplot involving a '60s-obsessed Martian graffiti artist (Harnois) and rote video-game-y action sequences to carry it along—and that simply won't cut it."

Entertainment Weekly positively described the film as a children's movie version of Avatar: "Enhanced by nimble ad-libbing from the comedy-trained cast, the screenplay is delightful, by turns funny and emotional, as befits a Disney family fable in which, through wacky adversity, Mom and kid reaffirm their love for each other while Dad is nowhere in sight. (He's not dead, just away on business.) And with its splendid use of computer-generated motion-capture animation and 3-D effects, the movie is also visually magnificent — modestly so." Mike Hale of the New York Times also gave the film a negative review, saying, "Mars, once again, looks to Earth to supplement its female population because, it seems, the women who run Mars think Earth mothers are skilled at child rearing."

Lael Loewenstein of Variety gave the film a mixed review and called it "A modestly enjoyable performance-capture creation bearing the unmistakable imprint of producer Robert Zemeckis." In addition to acclaiming the visuals, SFX also gave some praises towards the writing "there are some good laughs, it's pacy enough to whizz us on by the sometimes repetitive narrative [...] and although it's hard to see little boys admitting that they really do love their mummies – as much as the film wants them to – Mars Needs Moms does provoke a few lumps in older throats, for all you may decry its mawkish Stateside sensibilities."

Nick Schager of The Village Voice was very harsh; panning the "rubbery", "unreal", and "unsettling" character animation, which he called a "jarring dissonance" with the science fiction setting; and the stealing of common tropes in other well-known science fiction films. He also noted a major plot hole, specifically Supervisor's stealing of mothers' disciplinary skills for use on technological devices: "The plot thus hinges on a fundamental illogicality, since the chief differentiating characteristic between mothers and machines isn't discipline but compassion." William Thomas of Empire gave the film a two out of five stars, saying, "An uninvolving mo-cap adventure that's well below par. Marvin the Martian would be unhappy to share his planet with this bunch."

Some reviewers questioned the film's moral about well-behaved kids having their very good mothers taken by aliens.

=== Accolades ===
Mars Needs Moms received a nomination for a Movieguide Award for Best Film for Family Audiences; while John Powell's work on it, Rio (2011), and Kung Fu Panda 2 (2011) garnered him a nomination for the 2011 World Soundtrack Award for Film Composer of the Year.

== See also ==
- List of biggest box-office bombs
- List of films set on Mars
- List of films featuring extraterrestrials
- Mars in fiction
