= Riddle (film) =

- Directed by: John O. Hartman; Nicholas Mross
- Written by: John O. Hartman; Nicholas Mross
- Story by: Brian Hartman; Cole Stamm
- Produced by: Brian Hartman
- Starring: Elisabeth Harnois; Val Kilmer; Diora Baird; William Sadler
- Cinematography: Jeff Garton
- Edited by: Nathan Innes
- Music by: Scott Glasgow
- Production company: DARONIMAX Media
- Distributed by: XLrator Media
- Release date: January 10, 2013
- Running time: 100 minutes
- Country: United States
- Language: English

Riddle is a 2013 American mystery crime drama film directed by John O. Hartman and Nicholas Mross and starring Elisabeth Harnois, Val Kilmer, Diora Baird and William Sadler.

== Synopsys ==
College student Holly Teller (Elisabeth Harnois) is drawn to the mysterious small town of Riddle, Pennsylvania in search of her missing brother. Against the will of the local Sheriff (Val Kilmer) and town elder (William Sadler), she begins to unravel a mystery connected to an abandoned psychiatric hospital on the edge of town, uncovering a terrifying past the town is determined to keep hidden.

== Cast ==
- Elisabeth Harnois as Holly Teller
- Val Kilmer as Sheriff Richards
- Diora Baird as Amber Richards
- Ryan Malgarini as Nathan Teller
- William Sadler as Western Man/Jack Abel
- Bryan Lillis as Matt Caldwell
- Ben Bledsoe as Cameron Bronson
- Jack Erdie as Disheveled Man/Gene Bristol
- Bingo O'Malley as Hal
