= The Crate =

Short story by Stephen King

- Short story by Stephen King
- Country: United States
- Language: English
- Genre: Horror short story

Publication
- Published in: Gallery
- Publisher: Magna Publishing Group
- Media type: Print
- Publication date: 1979

"The Crate" is a short story by Stephen King, first published in the July 1979 issue of Gallery. In 1982, the story was adapted as a segment in the movie Creepshow, and included in comic-book form in the Creepshow graphic novella.

== Plot ==
An old wooden crate, marked from an 1834 Arctic expedition, is discovered by a janitor beneath the basement stairs at the zoology department of Horlicks University. He notifies Dexter Stanley, the school's biology professor, and together they open it to discover the crate contains a small yet powerful – and hungry – beast, still alive after 140 years. The creature kills and eats the janitor, as well as Stanley's grad student Charlie Gereson – consuming them entirely, leaving only scraps of clothing behind. In a daze, Stanley flees to the home of his friend, English professor Henry Northrup. He tells Henry the whole story, and Northrup believes him, seeing the crate-dwelling beast as a way to rid himself of his verbally abusive, alcoholic wife, Wilma.

He dopes Stanley's drink, and while Stanley is unconscious Henry writes and leaves a letter for Wilma to find and then drives to the university where he cleans up the blood and remaining scraps from the beast. Wilma meanwhile comes home and finds the letter and after reading it races up to the university. Henry had led her to believe in the note that Stanley had attacked a female grad student earlier and that she was now hiding underneath the stairs and that only Wilma would be able to talk her out. As Wilma peers under the stairs looking for the girl, Henry quickly comes up and pushes her from behind up against the beast's crate and starts screaming for it to come out and feed on her. After an initial delay that sees Wilma start to berate Henry, the beast – Northrup likens it to a Tasmanian devil, albeit possibly having six legs – does indeed appear and eat Wilma completely, then retreats back into its crate.

As Henry carefully loads the crate into another larger crate for disposal, he notes that Wilma's face (and only her face) is still visible in the crate. Northrup drives the crate within a crate to a local quarry and tips the entire cargo into the deep quarry lake.

Upon his return home Stanley wakes up, and the two decide to keep quiet about the entire incident – Stanley has gained a friend, and Northrup has lost his abusive wife, a situation that both are happy with.

== Film adaptation ==
The story was adapted as a segment in the film Creepshow. Although there are numerous small changes, the film version remains essentially faithful to the written source material. The changes include the depiction of the beast as a small ape-like creature with a mouth full of razor-sharp teeth, and the beast breaking out of the waterlogged crate after being dumped in the 400-foot-deep (120 m) lake.

Production designer Cletus Anderson made three prop crates for this segment. A bloody crate, formerly owned by director George A. Romero, is owned by David Burian, prop collector and film archivist. The other two crates are owned by KNB FX co-owner Greg Nicotero (who purchased it from special effects artist Tom Savini) and Creepshow soundtrack composer John Harrison.

== In popular culture ==
In the end of the episode "The Things In Oakwood's Past" in Creepshow, a news caster at the end of the episode mentions a crate being found at the bottom of Riders Quarry, where the crate had been deposited in the end of the movie.

== Publications ==
"The Crate" has not yet been collected in a Stephen King collection, but it has been printed a few times:

- Gallery (July 1979, magazine)
- Arbor House Treasury of Horror and the Supernatural – edited by Bill Pronzini (Arbor House/Priam Books, 1980) ISBN 0-87795-309-0
- Great Tales of Horror & the Supernatural – edited by Bill Pronzini (Galahad Books, 1981) ISBN 0-88365-699-X
- Fantasy Annual III – edited by Terry Carr (Pocket Books, 1981) ISBN 0-671-41272-8
- Creepshow – as a graphic novella with art by Bernie Wrightson (Plume, 1982) ISBN 0-452-25380-2
- Classic Tales of Horror & the Supernatural – edited by Bill Pronzini, Barry N. Malzberg, Martin Greenberg (Quill, 1991) ISBN 0-688-10963-2
- Shivers VI – edited by Richard Chizmar (Cemetery Dance Publications, 2011) ISBN 1-58767-224-3
- The Best of Shivers – edited by Richard Chizmar (Cemetery Dance Publications, 2019) ISBN 978-1-58767-529-4

== See also ==
- Stephen King short fiction bibliography
