= Creepshow =

1982 horror comedy anthology film by George A. Romero

- Theatrical release poster
- Directed by: George A. Romero
- Screenplay by: Stephen King
- Based on: "Weeds" "The Crate" by Stephen King
- Produced by: Richard P. Rubinstein
- Starring: Hal Holbrook; Adrienne Barbeau; Fritz Weaver; Leslie Nielsen; Carrie Nye; E. G. Marshall; Viveca Lindfors
- Cinematography: Michael Gornick
- Edited by: Pasquale Buba; Paul Hirsch; George A. Romero; Michael Spolan
- Music by: John Harrison
- Production companies: United Film Distribution Company; Laurel Show, Inc.
- Distributed by: Warner Bros.
- Release date: November 10, 1982
- Running time: 120 minutes
- Country: United States
- Language: English
- Budget: $8 million
- Box office: $21 million

Creepshow is a 1982 American horror comedy anthology film directed by George A. Romero and written by Stephen King in his screenwriting debut. It consists of five segments intercut with a sixth story acting mostly as an opening and epilogue; two of the segments, "The Lonesome Death of Jordy Verrill" and "The Crate", are based on stories by King, while the others are original material he wrote for the film.

The film stars an ensemble cast including Hal Holbrook, Adrienne Barbeau, Fritz Weaver, Leslie Nielsen, Carrie Nye, E. G. Marshall, Viveca Lindfors, Ted Danson and Ed Harris, with King and his son Joe portraying the respective main characters of two segments. It was primarily shot on location in Pittsburgh and its suburbs, including Monroeville, where Romero leased an old boys' academy (Penn Hall) to build extensive sets for the film. Creepshow is an homage to the EC horror comics of the 1950s, such as Tales from the Crypt, The Vault of Horror and The Haunt of Fear. In order for the film to give viewers a comic book feel, Romero hired long-time effects specialist Tom Savini to replicate comic-like effects.

The film earned $21 million in the United States. It was followed by a sequel, Creepshow 2 (1987), directed by the first film's cinematographer Michael Gornick, written by Romero and only featuring segments based on King stories. Two further works in the franchise were made without involvement from either Romero or King: the film Creepshow 3 (2006) and an eponymous television series (2019–2023).

== Plot ==
=== Prologue ===
Billy Hopkins, a young boy, gets disciplined by his abusive father, Stan, for reading Creepshow, a horror comic. Not wanting his son to be exposed to the comic's content, Stan throws it in the garbage while ranting on stories like people coming back from the dead and people turning into plants. As Billy sits upstairs, wishing that his father rots in Hell, he hears a sound at the window. The source of the noise turns out to be the Creep, the host of the comic book, who beckons him to come closer. The scene transitions to the first story.

=== "Father's Day" ===
Many years ago, Bedelia Grantham's wealthy, abusive, and domineering father Nathan made her life a living hell, even going so far as to have her lover killed just so he could keep her under his thumb. That Father's Day, she proceeded to bash her father's head in with a marble ashtray (which is hidden throughout the other stories) as he yammered loudly for his cake. Seven years later, the rest of the Grantham family gather together at the family estate on Father's Day, the anniversary of the murder. Nathan Grantham comes back as a zombie-like creature to get the cake he never got, and kills off his relatives one-by-one.

=== "The Lonesome Death of Jordy Verrill" ===
Jordy Verrill, a comedic and dim-witted yokel who runs a gas station, watches as a meteorite crash lands on his farm. Jordy plans to sell the meteorite to the local college, hoping that the sale will provide enough money to pay off a $200 bank loan. Taking precautions, he douses the meteorite with a bucket of water, causing it to crack open and spill a glowing blue liquid. Resolving to try to glue the halves together in the morning, Jordy nonchalantly dumps the liquid from the meteor into the soil, but not before it makes contact with his skin.

Over time, a strange grass-like substance grows all over Jordy's farm, everything Jordy has touched, and even on Jordy's body, which causes him to itch furiously. He starts to draw a bath to relieve the itching, but the ghost of his deceased father appears in his mirror, warning him against it, saying that water is what the plants want. Grimly rationalizing that not getting in would only delay the inevitable, Jordy succumbs to temptation and collapses into the bathwater.

The next morning, as The Farm Report plays on TV, Jordy's farm has been completely coated with dense layers of the alien vegetation, and Jordy himself has been transformed into a human-shaped collection of plant matter. In despair, he reaches for a coach gun and blows the top of his head off, killing himself. Immediately afterward, the weather announcement mentions that moderate temperatures and heavy rains are predicted as the plants spread down the roads to other towns.

=== "Something to Tide You Over" ===
Wealthy control freak Richard Vickers learns that his wife Becky is having an affair with well-to-do beach bum Harry Wentworth. When he confronts Harry about the affair, he plays a recording of a terrified Becky begging Harry to come save her. He soon lures Harry to Comfort Point, his private beachfront estate, and once there, he forces Harry to jump into a hole in the sand, whereupon Richard buries him up to his neck. To make matters worse, Richard has buried Harry below the high-tide line, ensuring that he will drown when the tide comes in. As a final insult, he even shows Harry live footage of Becky suffering the same fate before he drowns.

Later that night, Richard hears voices calling his name, as a mysterious, unseen presence easily bypasses Comfort Point's extensive security system. The culprits turn out to be Harry and Becky, the two lovers having returned as waterlogged, seaweed-covered revenants intent on revenge on their killer. Richard shoots them, but when the bullets have no effect, he barricades himself in his bedroom, only to find Becky and Harry already inside. The two victims taunt Richard, who laughs insanely.

Sometime later, the undead lovers buried Richard up to his neck on the beach. They have since disappeared together into the surf, leaving Richard's own seaweed-covered video camera to record his coming demise. The hysterical Richard screams that he can hold his breath "for a LONG time!" Some of the tide goes into his mouth as the story ends.

=== "The Crate" ===
At the prestigious Horlicks University, janitor Mike Latimer finds an old, dusty crate underneath a basement stairwell. The crate also catches Mike's interest when he discovers that it has been stored underneath the staircase for over a century and supposedly contains specimens of an "Arctic expedition". He notifies biology professor Dexter Stanley about the find, and invites him to the basement to help him open it. Once opened, the crate is revealed to contain a shaggy, diminutive, and ferocious creature. After the monster kills and eats Mike, the frightened Professor Stanley enlists the help of grad student Charlie Gereson. After the monster also kills and eats Charlie, Dexter goes to his colleague and fellow professor Henry Northrup for help.

Henry turns out to be married to an abusive and alcoholic shrew of a woman named Wilma "Billie". Seeing the supposed creature as an ideal way to rid himself of his wife, Henry appears to believe Dexter's story. To this end, Henry spikes Dexter's drink with sleeping pills and writes a note stating that Dexter had supposedly assaulted a female student. This brings Billie rushing to Amberson Hall, where Henry lures her under the basement stairs, trying to awaken the creature. As Billie rants at Henry for dragging her out there in the middle of the night and assaulting her, the beast awakens and proceeds to consume her.

The next morning, Henry tells Dexter that he secured the beast inside its crate and then dumped the crate into a nearby quarry, watching as it sank to the bottom. He convinces Dexter that the creature has drowned, and both men agree to let the authorities handle the disappearances. Unknown to Henry and Dexter, the beast is still alive and is last seen tearing the submerged crate apart.

=== "They're Creeping Up on You!" ===
Upson Pratt is a ruthlessly cruel business mogul who suffers from mysophobia, which has rendered him living in a hermetically sealed penthouse apartment outfitted with electric locks and surveillance cameras. His apparent contacts with the outside world are through the telephone and are primarily made to put-upon employees. One stormy night, Pratt receives a call from George Gendron, one of his subordinates, informing him that his company (Pratt International) has recently initiated a corporate takeover of Pacific Aerodyne. Gendron also informs Mr. Pratt that the takeover caused a business rival, Norman Castonmeyer, to commit suicide.

Pratt actually reacts joyously to this news, but soon after, he soon begins finding cockroaches, which he fears more than anything, crawling all around his apartment. Before long, someone manages to get through on Pratt's private line. The caller turns out to be Norman Castonmeyer's widow, Lenore, who tearfully recalls her husband's final moments and curses Pratt for causing his death. Later, a rolling blackout heads towards the building. During the blackout, cockroaches numbering in the hundreds of thousands begin to overwhelm him.

At his wits' end, Pratt locks himself inside a climate-controlled panic room to escape the growing swarm of cockroaches. He gets another call from Lenore, who continues to curse at him. It's during this call that Pratt finds his bed covers wriggling, and he removes them to discover that the cockroaches have already invaded the panic room. With no way for Pratt to escape, the cockroach swarm charges at him, which induces a fatal heart attack.

When electricity returns to the building, the apartment is utterly devoid of cockroaches. Pratt's corpse is shown in the panic room. Pratt's body soon begins to contort as cockroaches burst out of his mouth and chest, re-enveloping the panic room.

=== Epilogue ===
The next morning, two garbage collectors find the Creepshow comic book on the curb. They look at the book's ads for X-ray specs and a Charles Atlas–type bodybuilding course. They also see the advertisement for a voodoo doll, but lament that the order form has already been redeemed.

Inside the Hopkins house, Stan complains to his wife that he has a stiff neck, figuring he must have strained it. Upstairs, Billy is revealed to have sent away for the voodoo doll and has decorated it with a piece of his father's clothing and some of his hair. Stan clutches his throat in pain as Billy repeatedly and gleefully jabs the voodoo doll with a pin, finally getting revenge on his father for his abuse.

== Cast ==
"Wraparound Story"

- Joe King as Billy Hopkins
- Tom Atkins (uncredited) as Stan Hopkins
- Iva Jean Saraceni as Mrs. Hopkins
- Marty Schiff as Garbageman #1
- Tom Savini as Garbageman #2

"Father's Day"

- Carrie Nye as Sylvia Grantham
- Viveca Lindfors as Bedelia Grantham
- Ed Harris as Hank Blaine
- Warner Shook as Richard Grantham
- Elizabeth Regan as Cass Blaine
- Jon Lormer as Nathan Grantham
- John Amplas as Nathan's Corpse
- Nann Mogg as Mrs. Danvers
- Peter Messer as Yarbro

"The Lonesome Death of Jordy Verrill"

- Stephen King as Jordy Verrill
- Bingo O'Malley as:
  - Jordy's Father
  - Doctor

"Something to Tide You Over"

- Leslie Nielsen as Richard Vickers
- Ted Danson as Harry Wentworth
- Gaylen Ross as Becky Vickers
- Richard Gere (uncredited) as Man on TV

"The Crate"

- Hal Holbrook as Henry Northup
- Adrienne Barbeau as Wilma "Billie" Northup
- Fritz Weaver as Dexter Stanley
- Robert Harper as Charlie Gereson
- Don Keefer as Mike the Janitor
- Christine Forrest as Tabitha Raymond
- Chuck Aber as Richard Raymond
- Cletus Anderson as Host
- Katie Karlovitz as Maid
- Darryl Ferrucci (uncredited) as Fluffy

"They're Creeping Up on You"

- E. G. Marshall as Upson Pratt
- David Early as Mr. White
- Mark Tierno (uncredited) as the voice of Carl Reynolds
- Ann Muffly (uncredited) as the voice of Lenora Castonmeyer
- Ned Beatty (uncredited) as the voice of Bob Bean

== Production ==
Several screenshots from the film, demonstrating the way comic-book imagery and effects were used extensively by director George A. Romero to recreate the feel of classic 1950s EC horror comics, such as Tales from the Crypt

"Father's Day", "Something to Tide You Over" and "They're Creeping Up on You!" are original stories by King written for the film. "The Lonesome Death of Jordy Verrill" is based on King's short story "Weeds" and "The Crate" is based on the short story of the same name.

In keeping with Romero's tradition of filming in and around the Pittsburgh area, most of the film was shot in an empty all-girls school located outside Greensburg, Pennsylvania. The school was converted into a film studio, and the episodes "The Lonesome Death of Jordy Verrill" and "They're Creeping Up on You", as well as the prologue and epilogue, were filmed in their entirety at the former school. Filming took place at the Greensburg location throughout 1981.

In a 2015 interview with The A.V. Club, Ted Danson explained the brief shot of his character drowning underwater: "So they make a little aquarium tank. I got in a wetsuit and climbed in, and somebody would reach down with an oxygen tank ventilator thingy, and I'd breathe, and then they'd take that out. And there was a yoke made out of... I don't know, wood and fake sand, so it looked like my head was buried in the sand, underwater."

Ray Mendez, an entomologist with the American Museum of Natural History, and David Brody provided 20,000 cockroaches for the segment "They're Creeping Up on You". In the final scene of the segment—in which the room is almost filled with cockroaches—many of the apparent insects were actually nuts and raisins, as specified by Tom Savini.

== Release ==
Creepshow was given a four-week test release in Boston during July 1982 to get a sense of how to market it later on, with the hugely successful results convincing Warner Bros. that they had a hit on their hands. It went into wide release on Wednesday, November 10, 1982. In its opening weekend, Creepshow grossed $5,870,889 from 1,127 theatres, ranking number 1 at the U.S. box office, replacing First Blood in the top spot, and had a five-day total of $8,003,017. In total it grossed $21,028,755 in the United States and Canada, making it the highest grossing horror film for Warner Bros. that year.

== Reception ==
Rotten Tomatoes gave the film a 66% approval rating based on 76 reviews; the average rating is 6.3/10. The site's consensus reads: "It's uneven, as anthologies often are, but Creepshow is colorful, frequently funny, and treats its inspirations with infectious reverence." Metacritic, which uses a weighted average, assigned the film a score of 59 out of 100, based on 9 critics, indicating "mixed or average" reviews. Roger Ebert gave the film three out of four stars and wrote, "Romero and King have approached this movie with humor and affection, as well as with an appreciation of the macabre". In his review for The New York Times, Vincent Canby wrote, "The best things about Creepshow are its carefully simulated comic-book tackiness and the gusto with which some good actors assume silly positions. Horror film purists may object to the levity even though failed, as a lot of it is". Gary Arnold, in his review for The Washington Post, wrote, "What one confronts in Creepshow is five consistently stale, derivative horror vignettes of various lengths and defects". In his review for The Globe and Mail, Jay Scott wrote, "The Romero-King collaboration has softened both the horror and the cynicism, but not by enough to betray the sources — Creepshow is almost as funny and as horrible as the filmmakers would clearly love it to be". David Ansen, in his review for Newsweek, wrote, "For anyone over 12 there's not much pleasure to be had watching two masters of horror deliberately working beneath themselves. Creepshow is a faux-naif horror film: too arch to be truly scary, too elemental to succeed as satire". In his review for Time, Richard Corliss wrote, "But the treatment manages to be both perfunctory and languid; the jolts can be predicted by any ten-year-old with a stopwatch. Only the story in which Evil Plutocrat E.G. Marshall is eaten alive by cockroaches mixes giggles and grue in the right measure".

Bravo awarded it the 99th spot on their "The 100 Scariest Movie Moments", mostly for the scene with the cockroaches bursting out of Upson Pratt's body.

== Home media ==
The film was first released in 1983 on VHS and CED Videodisc.

In the United States, Warner Bros. released a one-disc set on October 26, 1999, with the only extra feature being the film's trailer. No other special features have ever been released with the Region 1 version. The Region 1 DVD was a two-sided disc. One side was the 1.85:1 transfer (widescreen) version of the film and the other side was the full-screen version.

A two-disc Special Edition DVD of Creepshow was released on October 22, 2007, in the UK. The discs feature a brand new widescreen transfer of the film sourced from the original master, a making-of documentary running 90 minutes (titled Just Desserts: The Making of Creepshow), behind-the-scenes footage, rare deleted scenes, galleries, a commentary track with director George A. Romero and make-up effects artist, Tom Savini, and more. The owner of Red Shirt Pictures, Michael Felsher is responsible for the special edition, the documentary and audio commentary in particular.

On September 8, 2009, the film was released on Blu-ray. Again the only special feature is the film's trailer. Scream Factory re-released the film on Blu-ray with new special features (along with most of the ones from the UK release) on October 23, 2018. This release is sourced from a brand new 4K scan of the original camera negative, despite the fact there was some criticism with the 5.1 audio track having been pitched too high and having sync issues (the included stereo track however has no issues).

Second Sight acquired the license to release a new Blu-ray in the United Kingdom. It contains all of the special features included in the special two-disc edition which was released in 2007. It also contains a new audio commentary with Director of Photography Michael Gornick, Actor John Amplas, Property Master Bruce Alan Green and make-up effects assistant Darryl Ferrucci.

On June 27, 2023, Scream Factory released a 4K Ultra HD Blu-ray of the film, featurning a "2023 4K scan of the original camera negative supervised and approved by director of photography Michael Gornick" and new Dolby Atmos audio track, together with the 5.1 and stereo tracks included on the 2018 Blu-ray release.

== Legacy, sequels, and adaptations ==
The film was adapted into an actual comic book of the same name soon after the film's release. Bernie Wrightson, known for his work on Heavy Metal and Warren magazines, and fittingly influenced by the 1950s E.C. Comics, did the artwork and is also the uncredited writer of the comic.

Tales from the Darkside was the television spin-off. Due to Warner Bros. holding certain rights including the name Creepshow, the title was changed.

A sequel, Creepshow 2, was released in 1987, and was once again based on Stephen King short stories, with a screenplay from Creepshow director George A. Romero. The film contained only three tales of horror (due to budget constraints) as opposed to the original's five stories.

Another sequel, Creepshow 3, featuring no involvement from Stephen King, George A. Romero, or anyone else involved in the production of the first two films, was released direct-to-video in 2007 (though it was finished in 2006) to mostly negative reviews. This film, in a fashion similar to the original Creepshow, features five short, darkly comedic horror stories.

Taurus Entertainment (rights holders of the original Creepshow) licensed the rights to Jace Hall, of HDFILMS, a Burbank, California company, to produce Creepshow: RAW, a web series based upon the original film. The pilot episode for Creepshow: RAW was wrapped on July 30, 2008. The pilot was directed by Wilmer Valderrama and features Michael Madsen. No other episodes were produced.

In 2011, the instrumental technical death metal band Blotted Science released the song "Ingesting Blattaria" on the EP The Animation Of Entomology, which was composed to synchronize with the scene "They're Creeping Up On You".

Another Creepshow television series was announced in July 2018, which was produced by Greg Nicotero and streamed on Shudder. Each episode of the series consisted of two stories. On January 16, 2019, it was announced that one of the segments of the pilot episode will be based on Stephen King's short story, "Survivor Type" from his 1985 collection, Skeleton Crew. Adrienne Barbeau will return in a new role, and Tobin Bell will contribute a role. On July 19, 2019, it was announced that the series will premiere on September 26, 2019. The series spawned a tie-in novel from Scholastic Books entitled Creepshow: The Taker, featuring two novellas inspired from the show. A follow-up novel is scheduled for release in April 2021, entitled Creepshow: The Cursed, also featuring two novellas inspired by the show. On October 30, 2019, the series was renewed for a second season, which premiered on April 1, 2021. On February 18, 2021, the series was renewed for a third season.

On August 3, 2019, Universal Destinations & Experiences announced that Creepshow would be coming to Halloween Horror Nights exclusively at its Universal Studios Hollywood theme park. The maze featured three segments from the 1982 movie as well as two others from the newly made web television version for Shudder.

Image Comics started publishing an ongoing series of comic books based on the Shudder series in 2022.
