= Timeless Tales from Hallmark =

- Genre: Adventure; Fantasy; Musical; Fairy tale
- Directed by: Don Lusk; Carl Urbano
- Presented by: Olivia Newton-John
- Starring: Elisabeth Harnois; Jeremy Yablan
- Voices of: Kath Soucie; Michael Bell; Susan Blu; Rob Paulsen; B.J. Ward; Tim Curry; Frank Welker
- Theme music composer: Chase/Rucker Productions
- Country of origin: United States
- Original language: English
- No. of episodes: 8

Production
- Executive producers: William Hanna; Joseph Barbera; Bruce David Johnson; Paul Sabella
- Producers: Davis Doi; Cos Anzilotti
- Running time: 30 minutes
- Production companies: H-B Production Co. Hallmark Cards

Original release
- Release: March 15, 1990 – September 6, 1991

Timeless Tales from Hallmark is an American live-action/animated direct-to-video series of fairy tale adaptations hosted by Olivia Newton-John, produced by H-B Production Co. and Hallmark Cards. Eight videocassettes were released between 1990 and 1991, and the series aired on USA Network in December 1991.

== Overview ==
Olivia Newton-John introduced a series of eight fairy tales for children followed by an environmental message in 1990. Each of the eight videocassettes contained an eight-page booklet with recycling tips; for example, you could recycle the video box printed on eco-friendly paper. The purpose of the franchise was to teach children how to handle Earth's resources responsibly.

The series ran for six episodes in 1990 and two episodes in 1991, released by Hanna-Barbera Home Video.

== Cast ==
=== Main ===
- Olivia Newton-John – Hostess (1990)
- Elisabeth Harnois – Emily (1990)
- Jeremy Yablan – Kevin (1990)

=== Voice cast ===
- Ruta Lee - Scarlotta (Rapunzel)
- Linda Purl - Rapunzel (Rapunzel)
- Michael Rupert - Prince (singing voice) (Rapunzel)
- Kath Soucie - Teddy Bear, Rapunzel's mother, Baby Rapunzel (Rapunzel)
- Mark L. Taylor - Prince (speaking voice) (Rapunzel)
- Michael Bell - Toad, King of the Flower Elves (Thumbelina), Carlisle (Puss in Boots)
- Hamilton Camp - Rumpelstiltskin
- Keene Curtis - Baron (Rumpelstiltskin)
- Alan Oppenheimer - King (Rumpelstiltskin)
- Lorna Patterson
- William Schallert
- Russi Taylor - Baby (Rumpelstiltskin)
- Gregg Berger - Swallow, Grasshopper (Thumbelina)
- Victoria Carroll - Woman (Thumbelina)
- Linda Gary - Mrs. Widget (Thumbelina)
- Vicki Juditz - Thumbelina (Thumbelina)
- Kenneth Mars - Mr. Hobnotch (Thumbelina)
- Dom DeLuise - Emperor (The Emperor's New Clothes)
- Henry Gibson - Sir Buffoon (The Emperor's New Clothes)
- Richard Erdman
- Ed Gilbert - Wolf Knight (The Emperor's New Clothes)
- Paul Kreppel
- Edie McClurg - Mathilda (The Emperor's New Clothes)
- Bradley Pierce - Boy Rabbit (The Emperor's New Clothes)
- Robert Ridgely - Sir Slippery (The Emperor's New Clothes)
- Frank Welker - Artie (The Emperor's New Clothes), Monkey Messenger (The Emperor's New Clothes), Wolf (The Emperor's New Clothes), Louie (The Steadfast Tin Soldier), Woof (The Elves and the Shoemaker), Puss in Boots (Puss in Boots)
- Charlie Adler - Ugly Duckling, Crocodile #1 (The Ugly Duckling)
- Darleen Carr - Duckling #2, Swan #2 (The Ugly Duckling)
- Nancy Cartwright - Duckling #1, Brown Duckling #2 (The Ugly Duckling)
- Jennifer Darling - Swan #1 (The Ugly Duckling)
- Paul Eiding - Rabbit with green shirt and red tie (The Ugly Duckling)
- Jerry Houser - Male Duck (The Ugly Duckling)
- Tress MacNeille - Duckling #4, Mother Duck, Widow Duck, Green Mallard Duck (The Ugly Duckling)
- Pat Musick - Duckling #5, Rabbit with glasses (The Ugly Duckling)
- Rob Paulsen - Runabout, Duckling #3, Crocodile #2 (The Ugly Duckling), Dandykin (The Elves and the Shoemaker)
- Susan Silo - Yellow Duck, Brown Duckling #1, Swan #3 (The Ugly Duckling)
- JoBeth Williams - Bettina (The Elves and the Shoemaker)
- Ed Begley Jr. - Bertram (The Elves and the Shoemaker)
- Susan Blu
- B.J. Ward
- René Auberjonois - Sorcerer (Puss in Boots)
- Marietta DePrima - Boy, Princess (Puss in Boots)
- Jeff Doucette
- Archie Hahn
- Kip King
- Clive Revill - King (Puss in Boots)
- Lara Teeter
- Paul Williams - Frogbrauten (The Steadfast Tin Soldier)
- Tim Curry - Jack (The Steadfast Tin Soldier)
- George Newbern - Tin Soldier
- Dan Gilvezan
- Paige Gosney - Sadie (The Steadfast Tin Soldier)
- Edan Gross - Michael (The Steadfast Tin Soldier)
- Megan Mullally - Ballerina (The Steadfast Tin Soldier)

== Episodes ==
No.	Title	Original release date
1	"Rapunzel"	September 27, 1990
Locked in a high tower by the jealous witch Scarlotta, Rapunzel uses her flowing long hair as a "golden stair" for a handsome prince. When the furious Scarlotta discovers the romance, she turns him into a tiny bird and banishes poor Rapunzel to a gloomy forest. Now, only love and Rapunzel's tears can break the spell and save the prince.
2	"The Emperor's New Clothes"	September 27, 1990
The Kingdom of Oaf is about to be attacked, but the Emperor is much too concerned with his spiffy new "invisible wardrobe" to notice. When the royal subjects finally admit that His Highness is wearing no clothes, the Emperor is embarrassed, but the kingdom is surprisingly saved.
3	"Thumbelina"	September 27, 1990
Thumbelina grows up to be just as tall as a thumb. Then, the evil toad Gargalong kidnaps her from her happy home. She escapes and moves in with Mrs. Widget the mouse, who tries to marry her to the boring mole, Mr. Budgenot. At the last moment, a kindly swallow carries her off to the land of the Flower Elves, where she marries and lives happily ever after.
4	"The Ugly Duckling"	September 27, 1990
Scorned for looking different, a poor little Ugly Duckling is abandoned when his family flies south for the winter. The duckling is befriended by the warmhearted Runabout Rabbit, but he soon finds that he doesn't fit in with bunnies. But after a miraculous change, the Ugly Duckling learns that sometimes being different can be beautiful.
5	"The Elves and the Shoemaker"	September 27, 1990
With fewer and fewer customers needing shoes, village shoemakers Bertram and Bettina and their faithful dog Woof are in quite a fix. Then, a trio of tiny wood elves arrives and cobbles the finest footwear ever seen; but a nasty cat named Squint has an appetite for elves, and only Woof can save the industrious pixies from a cat-astrophic fate!
6	"Rumpelstiltzkin"	September 27, 1990
When a boastful miller claims his daughter Gisela can spin straw into gold, the greedy king demands proof. With the help of a strange little man, the straw is turned into gold after Gisela promises her first-born royal heir in return. A year later, the little man demands payment unless she can guess his extraordinary name.
7	"Puss in Boots"	September 26, 1991
Young Carlisle is a poor miller's son with a most unusual inheritance: a cat named Puss who reveals he can talk and think. Puss helps Carlisle win the favor of the King and the attention of the beautiful Princess. To complete his plan, Puss journeys to the land of a sinister sorcerer, where he must use all his cat-wits to outsmart both the malicious magician and the King's scheming jesters.
8	"The Steadfast Tin Soldier"	September 26, 1991
10-year-old Michael realizes that his bravest toy soldier was made with only one leg. Soon, the Steadfast Tin Soldier falls in love with a toy ballerina and is pushed from the playroom window by a jealous Jack-in-the-box. In the perilous outside world, the Tin Soldier faces mischievous lads, a hungry hound, sewer rats and a soldier-swallowing fish in a quest to return to his beloved ballerina.
