= Creepshow (comics) =

1982 graphic novella by Stephen King

- Date: July 1982
- Page count: 64 pages
- Publisher: Plume (Penguin Books)

Creative team
- Writers: Stephen King
- Artists: Bernie Wrightson
- Colourists: Michele Wrightson
- ISBN: 0452253802

Creepshow is a graphic novella published by Penguin imprint Plume in July 1982, based on the film Creepshow (also from 1982). The film, directed by George A. Romero and written by Stephen King, consists of five short films, two of which are based on earlier prose stories by King, while the remaining three were written specifically for the film. The book's interior art is by Bernie Wrightson with Michele Wrightson, with a cover by Jack Kamen.

== Stories ==
The comic book, like the film, consists of five short stories. These are:

- "Father's Day"
- "The Lonesome Death of Jordy Verrill" (based on the short story "Weeds," first published in 1976)
- "The Crate" (based on the short story "The Crate," first published in 1979)
- "Something to Tide You Over"
- "They're Creeping Up on You"

There is no introduction or afterword of any kind, although on the back cover it states "Stephen King conjures up five jolting tales of horror." The short story, "The Crate" has never been collected in a King book.

== See also ==
- List of comics based on films
- Short fiction by Stephen King
