= Balls of Fury =

2007 American sports comedy film

- Theatrical release poster
- Directed by: Robert Ben Garant
- Written by: Thomas Lennon; Robert Ben Garant
- Produced by: Roger Birnbaum; Gary Barber; Jonathan Glickman; Thomas Lennon
- Starring: Dan Fogler; Christopher Walken; George Lopez; Maggie Q; Thomas Lennon; Robert Patrick
- Cinematography: Thomas E. Ackerman
- Edited by: John Refoua
- Music by: Randy Edelman
- Production companies: Intrepid Pictures; Spyglass Entertainment
- Distributed by: Rogue Pictures
- Release date: August 29, 2007
- Running time: 90 minutes
- Country: United States
- Language: English
- Box office: $41.1 million

Balls of Fury is a 2007 American independent sports comedy film directed by Robert Ben Garant from a screenplay he co-wrote with Thomas Lennon, who also co-starred and produced with Roger Birnbaum, Gary Barber and Jonathan Glickman. The film stars Dan Fogler in his first lead role, with a supporting cast of George Lopez, Christopher Walken, Maggie Q, Terry Crews, Cary-Hiroyuki Tagawa, James Hong and Jason Scott Lee.

Produced by Intrepid Pictures and Spyglass Entertainment, the film was released in the United States by Rogue Pictures on August 29, 2007, to generally negative reviews.

== Plot ==
Eleven-year-old Randy Daytona becomes anxious when he learns that his father Peter has bet on his performance in the 1988 Summer Olympics table tennis tournament finals. During his semi-final game against Karl Wolfschtagg of the German Democratic Republic, Daytona is injured in an accident. Unable to continue, he loses the match. Loan sharks, in the employ of criminal mastermind Feng, murder his father, and Daytona leaves competitive ping-pong.

Nineteen years later, Daytona is performing ping pong tricks on stage, but is fired after an incident when he accidentally causes an audience member to go into cardiac arrest. Federal Bureau of Investigation (FBI) agent Ernie Rodriguez arrives and requests Daytona's assistance in arresting Feng for gunrunning. Feng's hidden jungle hideout hosts an underground table tennis tournament, and Daytona's invitation is a way for the FBI to infiltrate Feng's organization. When Daytona accepts, Rodriguez tells him to win enough championships that Feng's scouts notice him. After losing a local tournament, Daytona is apprenticed to a blind man named Wong, Feng's former mentor, in Chinatown. Daytona also meets Wong's niece, Maggie. When locals vandalize Wong's house for violating their edict against teaching White people ping-pong, Daytona is forced to play against "The Dragon", a young girl, in exchange for Wong's right to stay. After Daytona beats the Dragon and gets punched, Feng's men discover his win and bring Daytona, Rodriguez, and Wong to Feng's facility.

Daytona defeats his first opponent, Freddy "Fingers" Wilson, but quickly learns that the tournament is literally sudden death — the loser is killed by a poisoned dart delivered by Feng's majordomo, Mahogany. After Daytona unsuccessfully tries escaping, Feng invites him to join his side and reveals that he only finished half of Wong's training. He says it would be the ultimate satisfaction to win Daytona away from Wong. Feng also shows Daytona his specially modified ping-pong table. It is wired to special vests that give increasingly powerful and fatal electrical shocks for failure. Daytona informs Rodriguez of a hidden cache of illegal guns that is sufficient to put Feng in jail and requests extraction, knowing that losing would mean death. While Rodriguez investigates the hidden facilities, Daytona defeats numerous opponents for his life.

Daytona and Wolfschtagg were set for the final round. After Wolfschtagg insulted Daytona's late father, Daytona reneged on the extraction and attempted to call off Rodriguez's plan only for Rodriguez to hastily break his arm. Feng discovers Rodriguez's attempts to contact the FBI and forces Daytona to face Wolfschtagg, then substitutes Maggie. When Wolfschtagg protests, Feng kills him. Daytona plays southpaw and tries stalling for time. Maggie tries losing on purpose to sacrifice herself. However, Daytona uses his ping-pong expertise to hit Maggie with the ball. Enraged, Feng orders them both executed. Mahogany shoots her dart at Daytona, but Maggie thwarts her. Daytona throws the paddle back at Mahogany, killing her. The FBI swarms the place, during which Daytona and his friends attempt to escape, but are captured after Daytona fails to rescue Feng's slaves. Determined to find out who Wong's best pupil was, Feng plays Daytona using the modified vests.

Daytona trips Feng's bodyguard during the game and activates the self-destruct sequence. Feng reveals they cannot turn off the suits. He also states that he changed the rules so that the ball can be bounced off any surface once and still be in play. The game moves through several buildings and finally onto a bridge over a nearby river. After Wong informs Daytona that Feng has a weak backhand, Daytona exploits his weakness, fatally electrocuting Feng as he falls into the river. Daytona and his friends, along with Feng's slaves, escape in Wong's boat before the facility explodes. Two months later, the major characters reunite for the reopening of Wong's rebuilt Mushu shop while also still hosting ping-pong games. Wong inadvertently falls down the elevator shaft, to Randy, Rodriguez, and Maggie's shock.

== Cast ==
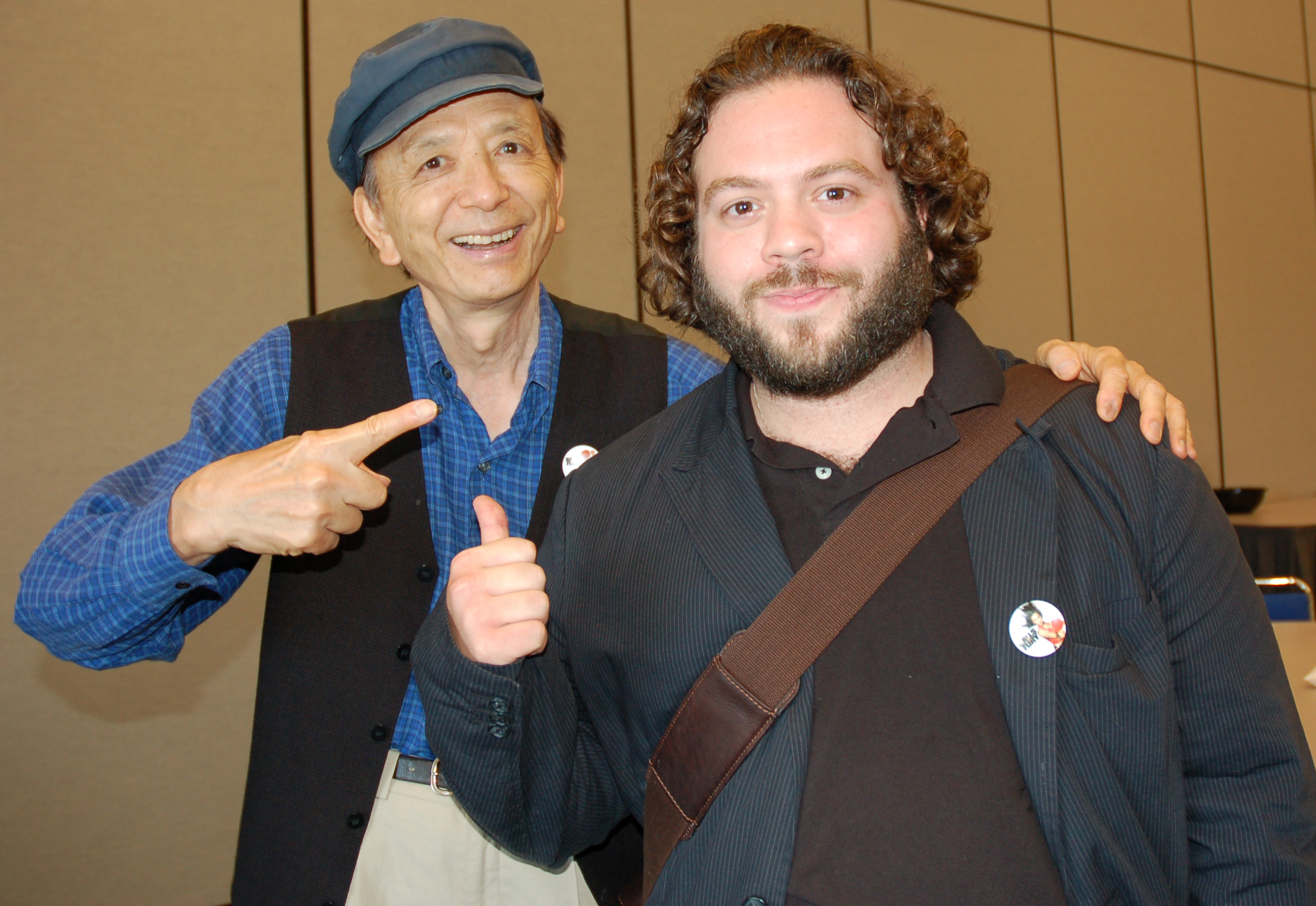
James Hong (left) with Dan Fogler (right) at the 2007 Comic-Con convention for a panel on the film

- Dan Fogler as Randy Daytona
  - Brett DelBuono as young Randy Daytona
- Christopher Walken as Feng
- George Lopez as Agent Ernie Rodriguez
- Maggie Q as Maggie Wong
- James Hong as Master Wong
- Robert Patrick as Sgt. Pete Daytona
- Aisha Tyler as Mahogany
- Thomas Lennon as Karl Wolfschtagg
- Diedrich Bader as Gary
- Cary-Hiroyuki Tagawa as Mysterious Asian Man
- Jason Scott Lee as Eddie
- Terry Crews as Freddy "Fingers" Wilson
- Patton Oswalt as "The Hammer"
- David Koechner as Rick the Birdmaster
- David Proval as Mob Boss

== Reception ==
=== Box office ===
The film opened with a U.S. gross of $11,352,123. The U.S. final gross, on November 4, 2007, was $32,886,940.

=== Critical response ===
As of June 2020, the film holds a 22% approval rating on Rotten Tomatoes, based on 130 reviews with an average score of 4.2/10. The site's consensus reads: "Tasteless, yet harmless, Balls of Fury nevertheless fails to generate enough laughs despite its lowbrow intentions". On Metacritic the film has a score of 38 out of 100 based on 26 reviews, indicating "generally unfavorable" reviews.

Brian Lowry of Variety wrote: "Relentlessly silly in spoofing martial-arts movie conventions, Balls of Fury has roughly enough laughs for a first-class trailer but wheezes, gasps and finally goes flat through much of its 90 minutes." Film historian Leonard Maltin was even less kind, declaring the picture a BOMB (his lowest possible rating), while describing it as a "...One-joke comedy that's every bit as inane and stupid as its premise. James Hong steals every scene he's in; but, alas, it's petty theft." Roger Ebert was more favorable in his review for the Chicago Sun-Times, giving it two-and-a-half out of four stars and recommending it as a modest comedy of "sheer absurdity".

== Video game ==
A tie-in game for Balls of Fury was released for Wii and Nintendo DS by Black Lantern. The storyline involves an underground ping-pong competition, based on the film. The Nintendo DS version was released on September 9, 2007, with the Wii version following on September 25. Both versions take advantage of motion controls to play ping pong. The Wii version was panned by critics, while the Nintendo DS version received better, but mixed reviews. IGN scored the Wii version a 1.2 out of 10, but scored the DS version a 6.5 out of 10.
