= The Marconi Bros. =

- Directed by: Michael Canzoniero; Marco Ricci
- Starring: Dan Fogler; Brendan Sexton III; Zoe Lister-Jones
- Edited by: Michael Berenbaum
- Production companies: Blue Print Group; Old World Films
- Release date: March 8, 2008
- Running time: 83 minutes
- Country: United States
- Language: English

The Marconi Bros. is an independent 2008 American comedy drama film. It was written and directed by cousins Michael Canzoniero and Marco Ricci.

== Plot ==
Two brothers quit their family carpet business to make it big with the king of Long Island Wedding Videography.

== Cast and crew ==
Carmine Marconi (Dan Fogler) is sick tired of installing carpet for his father and seeks to be wedding videographers with his brother Anthony.
Anthony Marconi (Brendan Sexton III) is Carmine's brother and is romantically interested in Lauren
Lou Burns (Jon Polito) Long Island's best wedding videographer, that reluctantly hires the Marconi brothers
Lauren (Zoe Lister-Jones) the love interest of Anthony
Mr. Marconi (Steven Randazzo) the father of Anthony and Carmine,
The film was edited by two-time Emmy Award-winner Michael Berenbaum.

== Releases and reception ==
In June 2007, the film was one of only ten films selected for participation in the IFP Rough Cut lab.

The film had its world premiere at the South by Southwest (SXSW) Film Festival (March 7–15, 2008). It was the opening night featured film at the 2008 NY Visionfest Film Festival.

For the North America video release, the title was changed to Wedding Bros.
