= Slippery Slope =

- Directed by: Sarah Schenck
- Starring: Kelly Hutchinson
- Release date: 2006
- Country: United States
- Language: English

Slippery Slope is a 2006 independent film directed by Sarah Schenck and starring Kelly Hutchinson.

== Plot ==
In order to finance her documentary project, a feminist filmmaker directs adult films after being recruited by a mysterious porn director.

== Cast ==
- Kelly Hutchinson as Gillian Black
- Jim True-Frost as Hugh Winston
- Laila Robins as Michaela Stark
- Wes Ramsey as Martin Breedlove
- Dan Fogler as Crafty
- Leslie Lyles as Judy Black
- Jessica Leccia as Stacy
