= Bingo O'Malley =

American actor (1933–2019)

- Born: Edward J. O'Malley; May 10, 1933; South Oakland, Pennsylvania
- Died: June 2, 2019 (aged 86); Bethel Park, Pennsylvania
- Occupation: Actor

Edward J. "Bingo" O'Malley (May 10, 1933 – June 2, 2019) was an American actor. He has been called "Pittsburgh’s finest actor."

== Biography ==
A native of South Oakland, Pennsylvania, O'Malley was the youngest of four children born to Catheryn Holleran and veteran firefighter Bartley J. O'Malley. The second youngest, brother Bart Jr., would meet his untimely end in 1959 at age 35, while following in the career footsteps of their father.

It was while working as a Navy radarman in Key West that O'Malley got his first role in a community theater production of The Rainmaker in the late 1950s.

He briefly aspired to the priesthood but found that "I am not religious." He then spent years as a juvenile-probation officer as well as a school social worker.

By the 1970s, O'Malley was working with a community theater in Churchill, Pennsylvania as well as the Pittsburgh Lab Theatre. For the next two decades O'Malley was one of the city's busiest actors.

On film, O'Malley appeared in fellow Pittsburgher George A. Romero's Knightriders as well as Creepshow and Two Evil Eyes. He also appeared in My Bloody Valentine 3D and Super 8.

== Filmography ==
=== Film ===
Year	Title	Role	Notes
1981	Knightriders	Sheriff Rilly	
1982	Creepshow	Jordy's father and The Doctor	Different roles in the same segment of the film.
1987	Lady Beware	Man in Window	
1988	The Kid Brother	Mr. Nitan	
1988	Dominick and Eugene	Abe	
1989	Heartstopper	Dr. Beransky	
1990	Two Evil Eyes	Ernest Valdemar	(segment "The Facts in the Case of Mr. Valdemar")
1992	Bob Roberts	Robert Roberts Sr.	
1993	The Cemetery Club	Judge	
1993	Money for Nothing	Old Man	
1995	Backstreet Justice	Rocky's Foreman	
1995	Houseguest	Ticket Vendor	
1996	Diabolique	Gannon	
2000	Wonder Boys	Wordfest Party Guest	
2001	The Bread, My Sweet	CEO	
2007	Graduation	Mr. Ryerson	
2009	My Bloody Valentine 3D	Officer Hinch	
2009	Homecoming	Elderly Proprietor	
2009	Deadtime Stories: Volume 1	Dr. Marsten	(segment "House Call")
2010	Love & Other Drugs	Sam	
2011	River of Darkness	Virgil Van	
2011	Super 8	Mr. Harkin	
2012	Death from Above	Crazy Leonard	
2013	Riddle	Hal	
2013	Out of the Furnace	Rodney Baze Sr.	
2014	Twin Reflex	Jonathan Crowe	
2015	All Saints Eve	Sheriff Doug Brewer	
2015	Transylvanian Curse	Ancient One	
2017	A Fancy Piece of Homicide	Thomas Anderson	

=== Television ===
Year	Title	Role	Notes
1990	Equal Justice	Old Time Attorney	1 episode (pilot)
1991	The 10 Million Dollar Getaway	Rudy Elrich	TV movie
1991	Guilty Until Proven Innocent	Judge Mollen	TV movie
1991	Dead and Alive: The Race for Gus Farace	Jackie Mahoney	TV movie
1992	Against Her Will: An Incident in Baltimore	Judge Stoneburner	TV movie
1992	What She Doesn't Know	Judge	TV movie
2007	The Kill Point	Bernard Kazmacki	8 episodes
2016	Outsiders	Ira Nichols	3 episodes
