= A Novel Romance =

- Directed by: Allie Dvorin
- Written by: Allie Dvorin
- Produced by: Morris S. Levy
- Starring: Steve Guttenberg; Shannon Elizabeth; Milena Govich; Matthew Del Negro; Jeffrey Ross; Doug E. Doug; Jay O. Sanders
- Cinematography: Jon Miguel Delgado
- Edited by: Glenn Conte
- Music by: Michelangelo Sosnowitz
- Distributed by: Entertainment One
- Release date: November 11, 2011
- Country: United States
- Language: English

A Novel Romance is a 2011 comedy-drama film about a chance meeting between two strangers that leads the unlikely pair to become roommates, and despite their differences, the two eventually realize that they have spent all their lives waiting for one another. The film is produced by Morris S. Levy and directed by Allie Dvorin. It stars Steve Guttenberg, Milena Govich and Shannon Elizabeth, with cinematography by Jon Miguel Delgado, editing by Glenn Conte, and a musical score by Michelangelo Sosnowitz.

== Plot ==
After making a name for himself in the advertising world, Nate Shepard is fired for being out of touch with the times and technology. Out at a restaurant, where he is to meet up with his girlfriend Adi and another couple, drinking his woes away at the bar, Nate meets the instantly desirable Jenny. They connect wonderfully and soon discover that they are actually waiting for each other.

When their other halves arrive, (Adi and Buddy) it seems as though they bring out the worst in Nate and Jenny. Dinner is uncomfortable and after dinner is made even more uncomfortable when Adi breaks up with Nate due to his lack of ambition and money.

Meanwhile, Jenny leaves town for a wedding and Buddy refuses to go with her so he can party with his best friend, LA hipster Sam Steele. Together, Buddy and Sam party, find girls, and consume an enormous amount of cocaine. Buddy ends up hooking up with a girl at the club and doing even more cocaine. The next day we find out that Buddy has overdosed and died. We're led to believe the girl he hooked up with called 911, but it's not certain.

Jenny is in shock. Nate attends the memorial and once again, Nate and Jenny connect. Jenny soon realizes she needs to be out of the apartment she shared with her deceased boyfriend and through the recommendation of a mutual friend, she finds herself at Nate's Brooklyn loft to see if a roommate situation might work out. As Nate and Jenny start to co-mingle their lives, everything gets a new perspective. Nate's budding career as a novelist gains traction, and Jenny begins her journey to get over Buddy.

After living with Nate for several weeks, Jenny decides to invite him to her family thanksgiving celebration. The celebration falls apart when Jenny and her father get into a fight and Jenny calls her parents out for not keeping in touch to make sure she's okay after her boyfriend died. After Jenny leaves the room and Nate follows, they end up having sex in what appears to be her childhood bedroom at Jenny's request.

== Cast ==
- Steve Guttenberg as Nate Shepard
- Shannon Elizabeth as Adi Schwartz
- Milena Govich as Jenny Sparks
- Doug E. Doug as Barry Humfries
- Matthew Del Negro as Buddy Andrews
- Kelly Bishop as Lily Sparks
- Jay O. Sanders as Walter Evans
- Maddie Corman as Alexandra Dumar
- Wass Stevens as Sam Steele
- Jeffrey Ross as Douglas Silver

== Reception ==
A Novel Romance holds a 0% fresh rating on Rotten Tomatoes based on 6 reviews.

== See also ==
- List of films with a 0% rating on Rotten Tomatoes
