= Don Peyote =

2014 film by Dan Fogler

- DVD cover
- Directed by: Dan Fogler; Michael Canzoniero
- Written by: Dan Fogler; Michael Canzoniero
- Produced by: Thomas Michael Sullivan; Luke Daniels; Carlos Velazquez; Stuart Braunstein
- Starring: Dan Fogler; Kelly Hutchinson; Jay Baruchel; Josh Duhamel; Annabella Sciorra; Wallace Shawn
- Cinematography: John Inwood
- Edited by: Dan Bush
- Music by: Ben Lovett
- Production companies: Highland Film Group; Studio 13; Wingman Productions; Redwire Pictures; Casadelic Pictures
- Distributed by: XLrator
- Release date: May 16, 2014
- Running time: 99 minutes
- Country: United States
- Language: English

Don Peyote is a 2014 American comedy film written and directed by Dan Fogler and Michael Canzoniero. It stars Fogler as a slacker who has a spiritual awakening and becomes obsessed with conspiracy theories.

== Plot ==
Warren (Dan Fogler) is an unemployed artist and pot head who has crazy dreams. That is the only remarkable thing about him until a day comes when a crazy homeless man confronts him on the street. From that day on, Warren descends into himself, insanity and a confusion of mind and body, spurred on by drugs, along with Doomsday and conspiracy theories.

== Cast ==
- Dan Fogler as Warren Allman
- Josh Duhamel as Transient
- Jay Baruchel as Bates
- Wallace Shawn as Psychotherapist
- Kelly Hutchinson as Karen
- Yang Miller as Balance
- Anne Hathaway as Agent of TRUTH
- Topher Grace as Glavin Culpepper
- Annabella Sciorra as Giulietta
- Abel Ferrara as Taxi Cab Driver
- Daniel Pinchbeck as Himself
- William Leroy as Nazi Sex Addict
- Gavin Octavien as Extra

== Production ==
Fogler recruited the large cast of cameos in part by allowing them to co-write their characters and improvise. The film was shot between 2010 and 2013.

== Release ==
XLrator gave Don Peyote a limited release on May 16, 2014, and released it on DVD on July 8, 2014.

== Reception ==
Rotten Tomatoes, a review aggregator, reports that only one of thirteen surveyed critics (8%) gave the film a positive rating; the average rating was 3.5/10. Metacritic rated it 14/100 based on eight reviews. Sheri Linden of The Hollywood Reporter wrote, "To call Don Peyote a mess would be putting too fine a point on it. The hallucinatory odyssey of a conspiracy-theory-obsessed New Yorker is a bad trip, destination nowhere." Daniel M. Gold of The New York Times called it "a cautionary tale of drug-fueled decline" that may not have been realized by its creators. Gary Goldstein of the Los Angeles Times called it "a tedious, incoherent look at a paranoid stoner's emotional and spiritual unraveling". Calum Marsh of The Village Voice wrote that the film becomes increasingly incomprehensible as time goes on. Christopher Schobert of Indiewire rated it D and wrote, "Perhaps in the hands of a Charlie Kaufman or Michel Gondry, this story could move beyond the unexceptional, but in Fogler's hands, Don Peyote is a slow-moving dirge." Vadim Rizov of The Dissolve rated it 0/5 stars and wrote, "In practice, Dan Fogler's sophomore directorial effort (co-directed/written by Michael Canzoniero) is merely execrable, segueing incoherently from one stand-alone fragment of a terrible movie to another."
