= Dan Fogler =

American actor, comedian and writer (born 1976)

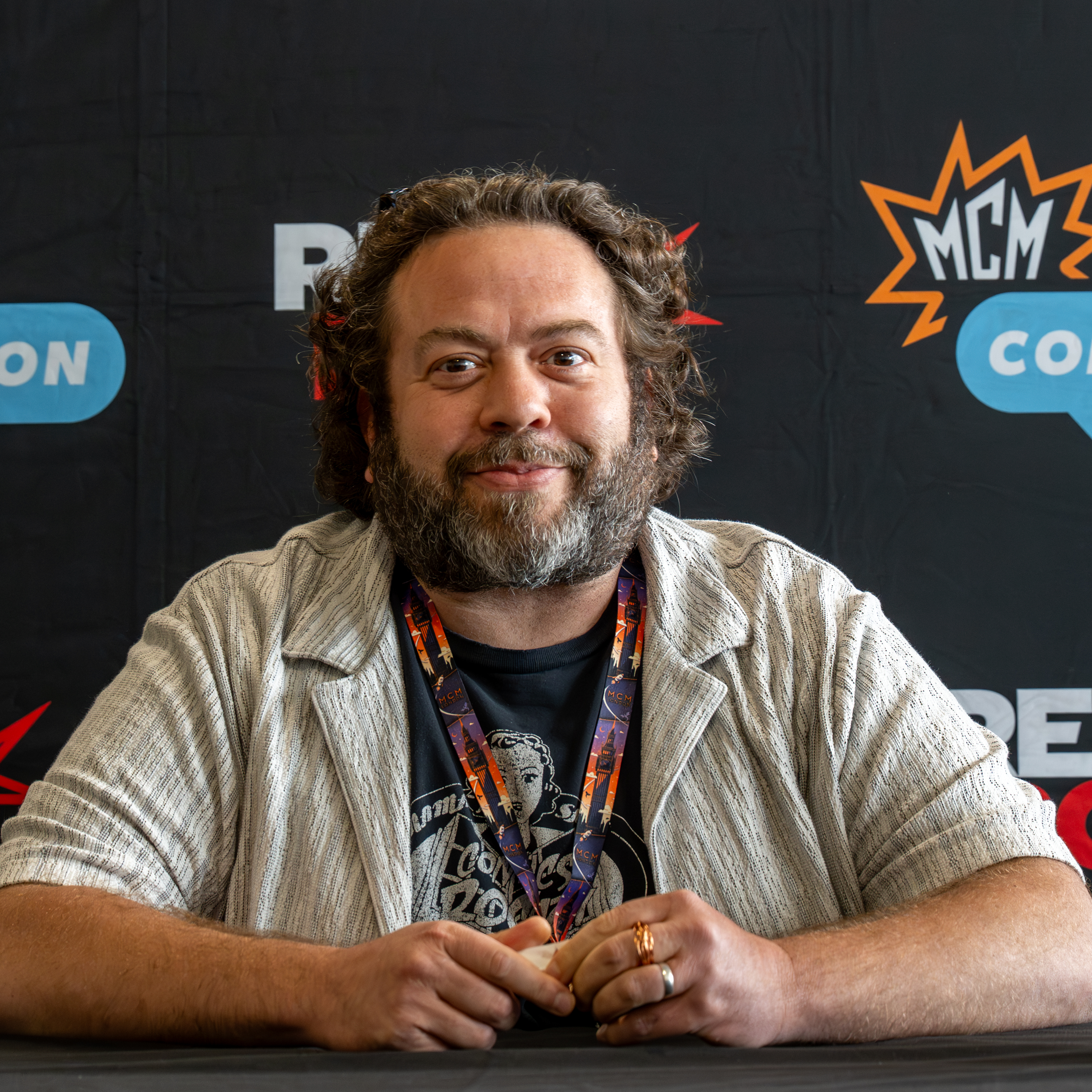
- Fogler at MCM Comic Con London, May 2025
- Born: Daniel Kevin Fogler; October 20, 1976 (age 49); Brooklyn, New York, U.S.
- Education: Boston University (BFA)
- Occupations: Actor; comedian; writer
- Years active: 1997–present
- Spouse: Jodie Capes (m. 2009)
- Children: 2
- Website: dan-fogler.com

Daniel Kevin Fogler (born October 20, 1976) is an American actor, comedian and writer. He had his breakout in theatre, winning the Tony Award for Best Featured Actor in a Musical for his role as William Barfée in the Broadway production of The 25th Annual Putnam County Spelling Bee, which was also his Broadway debut.

In the late 2000s, Fogler transitioned to film, starring in the films Good Luck Chuck (2007), Balls of Fury (2007), Fanboys (2009), Taking Woodstock (2009), and Love Happens (2009). In the early-to-mid 2010s, Fogler starred in the films Take Me Home Tonight (2011) and Europa Report (2013), and had main roles as Kenny Hayden on the ABC sitcom Man Up! (2011) and Dave Lindsey on the first season of the ABC anthology series Secrets and Lies (2015). He had a starring voice role in the animated film Mars Needs Moms (2011).

In the late 2010s to early 2020s, Fogler had a starring role as Jacob Kowalski in the Harry Potter spin-off film series Fantastic Beasts (2016–2022). In the 2020s, he also starred in the films Spinning Gold (2023) and Juliet & Romeo (2025), and portrayed Albert Grossman in the biographical film A Complete Unknown (2024), which earned him a Screen Actors Guild Award nomination. On television, he portrayed Luke Abrams in the AMC horror series The Walking Dead (2018–2022), Francis Ford Coppola in the Paramount+ miniseries The Offer (2022), and Ser Torrhen Manderly in the HBO fantasy series House of the Dragon (2026).

Fogler made his directorial debut with the horror-comedy film Hysterical Psycho (2009), which he also wrote. He also directed, wrote, and starred in the film Don Peyote (2014).

== Early life and education ==
Fogler was born on October 20, 1976, in Brooklyn. His father, Richard Fogler, was a surgeon, and his mother Shari was an English teacher. Fogler is Jewish. He attended elementary school at the Windmill Montessori School in Brooklyn. He graduated from Poly Prep Country Day School in 1994, before attending the School of Theatre at Boston University.

== Career ==
Fogler's first television appearance was in 2002 on Fox's 30 Seconds to Fame, as a contestant impersonating Al Pacino. Other television credits include recurring roles on ABC's The Goldbergs, NBC's Hannibal, CBS's The Good Wife and voice work for Fox's American Dad!. Fogler also has had starring roles in ABC's Man Up! and Secrets & Lies, and starred in a music video for Type O Negative's song "I Don't Wanna Be Me", in which he played a man recording himself on video dressed as celebrities including Marilyn Monroe, Michael Jackson, Britney Spears, and finally the band's singer, Peter Steele.

Fogler made his Broadway debut in 2005 with The 25th Annual Putnam County Spelling Bee. The role of William Barfée won him the Theatre World Award for the original off-Broadway production and the Tony Award for Best Featured Actor in a Musical for the original Broadway production.

On film, Fogler starred in 2007's Balls of Fury as Randy Daytona and in Good Luck Chuck opposite Dane Cook and Jessica Alba. He also had roles in Fanboys, Take Me Home Tonight, Scenic Route, Europa Report and the J. K. Rowling adaptation Fantastic Beasts and Where to Find Them, released worldwide in November 2016.

Fogler has done a variety of voiceover roles in films such as Horton Hears A Who! with Steve Carell and Jim Carrey, Disney's Mars Needs Moms, 2008's Kung Fu Panda with Jack Black and Jackie Chan, and the 2013 comedy Free Birds.

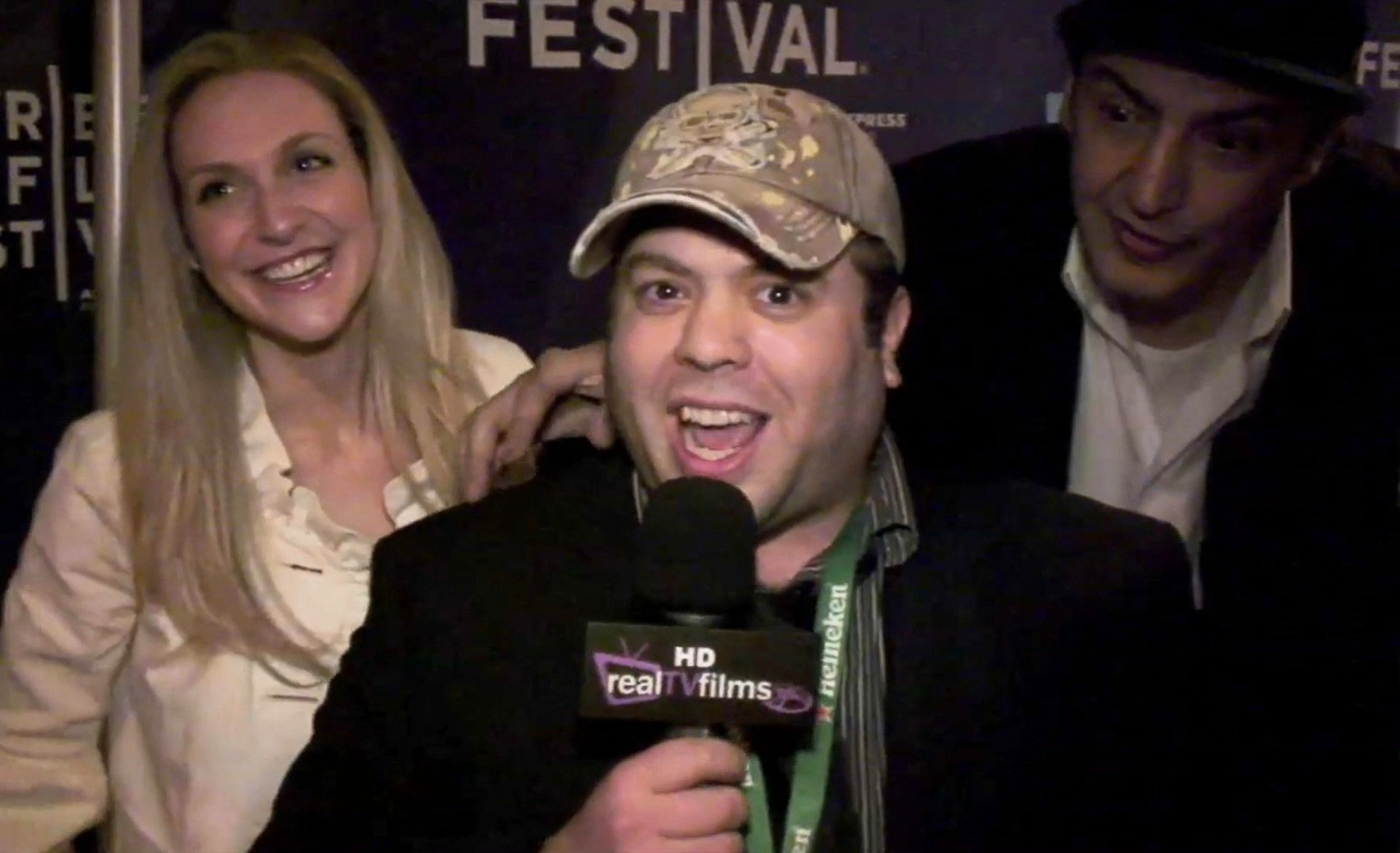
Fogler with actors Kate Gersten and Nicholas DeCegli of Hysterical Psycho in 2009

Fogler wrote and directed the play Elephant in the Room in 2007, a work inspired by Ionesco's Rhinoceros and produced by the New York International Fringe Festival. He also wrote and directed the film Hysterical Psycho, which premiered at the 2009 Tribeca Film Festival and featured actors from Stage 13, a film and theater production company of which Fogler is a founding member. Fogler wrote, directed, and starred in Don Peyote (2014), with supporting performances from Josh Duhamel, Anne Hathaway, and Topher Grace.

In 2010, Archaia Entertainment published Fogler's first graphic novel, the horror anthology Moon Lake. The collection of stories chronicles the past, present, and future of the most haunted town on Earth. His next graphic novel, Brooklyn Gladiator, was published in 2018 by Chapterhouse. Heavy Metal published Fogler's graphic novel Fishkill in 2020.

In 2025, Fogler was cast as Torrhen Manderly on the third season of HBO's House of the Dragon.

== Personal life ==
In 2009, Fogler married Jodie Capes, co-founder of Capes Coaching, a career coaching company for actors and artists. They have two daughters, Edie and Franny. In 2020, Fogler revealed on Instagram his successful two-year effort to lose 100 pounds (45 kilograms) for his health and his family, as he feared obesity-related diseases such as diabetes and high blood pressure.

== Filmography ==
=== Film ===
Year	Title	Role	Notes	Ref.
1999	Brooklyn Thrill Killers	Melvin Mittman		
2000	Home Field Advantage	Charlie		
2000	Bust a Move	Charlie		
2002	Hyper	Lenny		
2005	Dumped!	Elliott		
2006	School for Scoundrels	Zack		
2006	Slippery Slope	Crafty		
2007	Good Luck Chuck	Stu		
2007	Balls of Fury	Randy Daytona		
2008	Horton Hears a Who!	Yummo Wickersham, Councilman (voices)		
2008	The Marconi Bros.	Carmine Marconi		
2008	Kung Fu Panda	Zeng (voice)		
2009	Fanboys	Hutch		
2009	Hysterical Psycho	Psychiatrist	Also writer and director	
2009	Taking Woodstock	Devon		
2009	Love Happens	Lane		
2011	Crocodile Tears	Director	Short film	
2011	Take Me Home Tonight	Barry Nathan		
2011	Mars Needs Moms	George "Gribble" Ribble (voice)	Also motion capture	
2012	Dog Eat Dog		Short film	
2012	Hellbenders	Eric		
2013	Scenic Route	Carter		
2013	Europa Report	Dr. Nikita Sokolov		
2013	Free Birds	Governor Bradford (voice)		
2014	My Depression (The Up and Down and Up of It)	Singer (voice)	Short film	
2014	Don Peyote	Warren / Don Peyote	Also co-writer and co-director	
2014	Post Modern Ophelia	Goldie Stern	Short film	
2015	Barely Lethal	Mr. Drumm		
2015	Ava's Possessions	JJ Samson		
2016	The Guardian Brothers	Shen Tu (voice)	English dub	
2016	Custody	Denholz		
2016	Fantastic Beasts and Where to Find Them	Jacob Kowalski		
2017	Becks	Dave		
2017	Sex Guaranteed	Carl		
2018	30 Nights	Dr. Lance Ying		
2018	In Like Flynn	Joel Schwartz		
2018	Fantastic Beasts: The Crimes of Grindelwald	Jacob Kowalski		
2019	Jay and Silent Bob Reboot	Con-Ployee	Cameo	
2020	The Argument	Jack		
2022	Fantastic Beasts: The Secrets of Dumbledore	Jacob Kowalski		
2022	DC League of Super-Pets	Carl, Pilot, Racer (voices)		
2023	Spinning Gold	Buck Reingold		
2024	No Time to Spy: A Loud House Movie	Rufus Dufus (voice)		
2024	A Complete Unknown	Albert Grossman		
2025	Bank of Dave 2: The Loan Ranger	Detective Mitch Adams		
2025	Juliet & Romeo	The Apothecary		

=== Television ===
Year	Title	Role	Notes	Ref.
2009–2010	American Dad!	Various voices	2 episodes	
2010	M'Larky	Lt. Black	5 episodes; also director (4 episodes)	
2010	Kung Fu Panda Holiday	Zeng (voice)	Short film	
2011–2012	Man Up!	Kenny Hayden	13 episodes	
2011; 2018	Robot Chicken	Various voices	2 episodes	
2012	Prairie Dogs	Roj	Unsold pilot	
2012	Ugly Americans	Carl (voice)	Episode: "The Stalking Dead"	
2013	Hannibal	Franklyn Froideveaux	3 episodes	
2013–2022	The Goldbergs	Marvin Goldberg	14 episodes	
2014	Black Box	Fred Baker	Episode: "Emotions"	
2014	Living the Dream	Russ Danzinger	Unsold pilot	
2015	Secrets and Lies	Dave Carlyle	10 episodes	
2015	The Good Wife	Nick Zubrovsky	Episode: "Winning Ugly"	
2017	Famous in Love	Himself	Episode: "Fifty Shades of Red"	
2017	Sharknado 5: Global Swarming	Dan Fogler	Television film	
2018–2020; 2022	The Walking Dead	Luke Abrams	Recurring role; 17 episodes	
2021–2024	Big City Greens	Burger Clown (voice)	2 episodes	
2022	The Offer	Francis Ford Coppola	Miniseries; 10 episodes	
2023	Aqua Teen Hunger Force	Emperear (voice)	2 episodes	
2024	Eric	Lennie Wilson	Miniseries; 6 episodes	
2025	The Rainmaker	Melvin Pritcher	8 episodes	
2026	House of the Dragon	Torrhen Manderly	Main role; 6 episodes	

=== Video games ===
Year	Title	Voice role	Ref.
2016	Lego Dimensions	Jacob Kowalski (voice)	

=== Music videos ===
Year	Title	Performer	Album	Ref.
2003	"I Don't Wanna Be Me"	Type O Negative	Life Is Killing Me	

=== Streaming ===
Year	Title	Role	Channel	Ref.
2020	ClickSport-1: Tournament of Grandiosity	Xoc Aventus	Crown Channel	
2021	ClickSport-2: The Buffering	Xoc Aventus	Crown Channel	

== Awards and nominations ==
Year	Award	Category	Nominated work	Result
2005	Tony Awards	Best Featured Actor in a Musical	The 25th Annual Putnam County Spelling Bee	Won
2017	Saturn Awards	Best Supporting Actor	Fantastic Beasts and Where to Find Them	Nominated
2025	Screen Actors Guild Awards	Outstanding Performance by a Cast in a Motion Picture	A Complete Unknown	Nominated
