= Liane Balaban =

Canadian actress

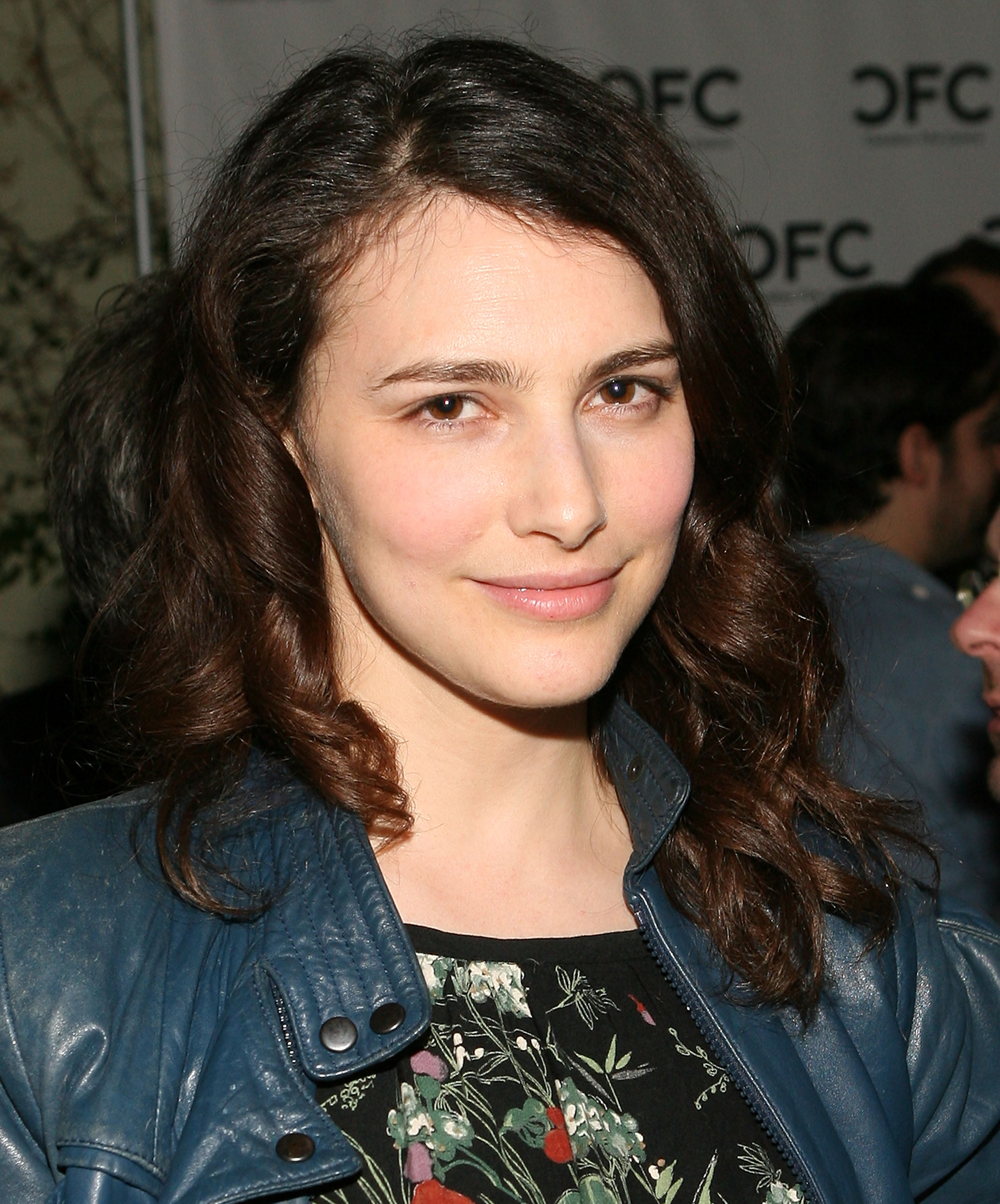
- Balaban in 2011
- Born: June 24, 1980 (age 46); North York, Ontario, Canada
- Education: Concordia University (BA)
- Occupation: Actress
- Years active: 1999–present
- Spouse: Patrick Costello (m. 2013)
- Children: 1

Liane Balaban (born June 24, 1980) is a Canadian actress. Her film debut was in New Waterford Girl (1999) as Agnes-Marie "Mooney" Pottie. She has since appeared in the films Definitely, Maybe (2008), Last Chance Harvey (2008), and the independent drama One Week (2008). She has guest-starred on the television series NCIS: Los Angeles, Covert Affairs and Alphas, and joined the cast of Supernatural for its eighth season.

== Early life ==
Balaban was born in North York, Ontario, the daughter of a Catholic mother who worked as a medical secretary, and a Jewish father from the Uzbek SSR in the Soviet Union, who worked in real estate. She grew up in the Willowdale neighbourhood of North York, now part of Toronto, and went to high school at Lawrence Park Collegiate Institute, where she was classmates with singer Henry Lau. She majored in journalism at Ryerson University but left to concentrate on acting. She received a Bachelor of Arts degree in political science from Concordia University.

== Career ==
Balaban made her feature film debut in New Waterford Girl (1999), as a 15-year-old misfit longing to escape the Cape Breton coal-mining town of New Waterford. Set in the 1970s, the film was directed by Allan Moyle. Producer Julia Sereny, who knew Balaban through her aunt and uncle, asked her to audition for the film. Balaban had studied drama in high school, but did not intend to be an actor. After seven auditions, she landed the part that won a Special Jury Citation at the 1999 Toronto International Film Festival and a nomination for a Canadian Comedy Award.

She made a follow-up with Saint Jude (2000), directed by John L'Ecuyer. She starred in the TV movie After the Harvest (2001), opposite Sam Shepard, and appeared in Happy Here and Now (2002), opposite David Arquette and Ally Sheedy. She also starred in the horror film Spliced (2002), co-starring Ron Silver. She was a member of the garage/electro/pop band We are Molecules, where she sang and played keyboards and drums. She has also written for arts newspapers.

While previously unsure of acting as a career, Balaban committed to seriously pursuing acting around 2007. She appeared in her first mainstream Hollywood feature film, Definitely, Maybe in 2008, a romantic comedy starring Ryan Reynolds. She next appeared in Last Chance Harvey, a romance starring Dustin Hoffman and Emma Thompson, which had a wide release in January 2009, in the supporting role of Susan, the estranged and soon-to-be-married daughter of Hoffman's character. She told The Globe and Mail that her time in London making the film was like "going to the best acting school in the world".

Balaban starred in the independent drama One Week (2008) as Samantha Pierce, a woman whose fiancé (Joshua Jackson) is diagnosed with terminal cancer and takes a motorcycle trip across Canada. Directed by Michael McGowan, Balaban was nominated for the Genie Award for Best Performance by an Actress in a Supporting Role in 2010 for her performance. She starred in the black comedy You Might as Well Live (2009) as a psychotic girl who is obsessed with explosives.

Balaban's other films in 2009 included Not Since You, a drama about a group of college friends; and The Trotsky by Jacob Tierney. She also shot the CBC TV movie Abroad, based on the love life of Leah McLaren, a Toronto columnist for The Globe and Mail. Balaban was nominated for the Gemini Award for best lead actress in a dramatic program or miniseries for the role. She then starred in The New Tenants with Vincent D'Onofrio, a short film entered in the CFC Worldwide Short Film Festival, which also won the 2010 Academy Award for Best Live Action Short Film.

Balaban starred in the 2010 comedy/drama Coach, directed by Will Frears, as an emergency room doctor who falls for an inner city soccer coach (Hugh Dancy). She appeared in the "Communication Breakdown" episode of the TV series Covert Affairs as Natasha Petrova, a Russian computer hacker, the character Auggie (Chris Gorham)'s ex-girlfriend. She also voiced Lucrezia Borgia in the video game Assassin's Creed: Brotherhood. She played a journalist opposite Paul Ahmarani in The Future is Now!, a docudrama by Gary Burns.

Balaban made her stage debut in February 2011 starring as Claire in Divisadero: A Performance at the Theatre Passe Muraille in Toronto. Directed by Daniel Brooks, it was an adaptation of a Governor General's Award-winning novel by Michael Ondaatje, with music by Justin Rutledge. It was restaged in February 2012.

Balaban filmed the independent comedy, Finding Joy, in Fort Lauderdale, Florida in mid-2011. She signed on to a recurring role in the CW drama Supernatural in 2012, as Amelia, a young doctor with tragedy in her past. In August she was in Newfoundland filming The Grand Seduction, an English-language version of the 2003 Québécois comedy Seducing Doctor Lewis (French: La grande séduction), in which she plays the love interest, opposite Taylor Kitsch, directed by Don McKellar. She will also appear in the independent film The People Garden, starring Pamela Anderson and written and directed by Nadia Litz.

== Personal life ==
In 2007, Balaban lived in Mile End, Montreal. She described Montreal as "not a city that revolves around acting, so you stay very grounded here" to Hour magazine. She enjoys reading, writing, going to art galleries, and listening to music. She told Toronto's Now magazine in January 2009 that she was often mistaken for actress Natalie Portman. She moved to Los Angeles in 2010. As of 2013, she resides in both Los Angeles and Toronto.

Balaban married Patrick Costello in November 2013 and gave birth to a son on March 1, 2016.

== Filmography ==
List of acting performances in film and television
Year	Title	Role	Notes
1999	New Waterford Girl	Mooney Pottie	Film debut, Nominated – Canadian Comedy Award
2000	The City	Alison	TV series, episode: "Blindside!"
2000	Saint Jude	Jude	
2001	Full	Meryl	
2001	After the Harvest	Lind Archer	TV film
2001	World Traveler	Meg	
2002	Happy Here and Now	Amelia	
2002	The Annual Crafts & Arts Contest	Neilburt	
2002	Spliced	Mary	
2004	Seven Times Lucky	Fiona	
2004	Eternal	Lisa	
2005	Anniversary Present	Sandra Dobbs	TV film
2005	Leo	Ameilia	
2005	Burnt Toast	Woman	TV film
2006	Above and Beyond	Shelagh Emberly	TV miniseries
2007	The Canadian Shield	Genvieve	
2007	St. Urbain's Horseman	Jenny	TV miniseries
2008	Definitely, Maybe	Kelly	
2008	Beware of Dog		
2008	One Week	Samantha Pierce	Nominated – Genie Award for Best Performance by an Actress in a Supporting Role
2008	Heartless Disappearance Into Labrador Seas	Lily	
2008	Last Chance Harvey	Susan	
2008	A Valentine Haircut	Clare	Short film
2009	You Might as Well Live	Edna Kemperton	
2009	Numb3rs	Jessie Robertson	TV series, episode: "First Law"
2009	The Trotsky	Nadza	
2009	Not Since You	Heather	
2009	The New Tenants	Irene	Academy Award for Best Live Action Short Film
2010	Abroad	Amy Pearce	TV film; Nominated – Gemini Award for Best Performance by an Actress in a Leading Role in a Dramatic Program or Mini-Series
2010	Coach	Gabrielle	
2010; 2014	Covert Affairs	Natasha Petrova	TV series, recurring, 1 episode in Season 1, 5 episodes in season 4, and 2 episodes in season 5
2010	NCIS: Los Angeles	Emma Mastin	TV series, episode: "Black Widow"
2011	The Future is Now!	Woman of Tomorrow	
2011	Rise of the Damned	Jesse	
2011–2012	Alphas	Anna	TV series, 3 episodes: "Rosetta", "Original Sin", "Gaslight"
2012	Maniac	Judy	
2012–2013	Supernatural	Amelia Richardson	TV series
2013	Motive	Sarah Muller	TV series, episode: "Against All Odds"
2013	Finding Joy	Joy	
2013	The Grand Seduction	Kathleen	
2013	Played	Lida Simenko	TV series, episode: "Untouchables"
2013	Rookie Blue	Kelly Harrison	TV series, episode: "Two Truths and a Lie"
2014	Saving Hope	Abigail/Kayla Bradly	TV series, episode: "Don't Poke the Bear"
2014	Republic of Doyle	Ruby Rennette	TV series, 2 episodes
2015	Man Seeking Woman	Claire	TV series, episode: "Feather"
2017	Meditation Park	Dylan	
2021	Woman in Car	Safiye	
2021	A Small Fortune	Sam	
2022	You Can Live Forever	Beth	
