= Document of the Dead =

- DVD cover
- Directed by: Roy Frumkes
- Written by: Roy Frumkes
- Produced by: Roy Frumkes
- Starring: George A. Romero; Richard P. Rubinstein; Michael Gornick; Carl Augenstein; Tom Savini; Ken Foree; Scott H. Reiniger; David Emge; John Amplas; Roy Frumkes; Christine Forrest
- Narrated by: Susan Tyrrell; Nicole Potter (1989)
- Cinematography: Reeves Lehmann
- Edited by: Dennis Werner; Gary Cooper (1989); Hedy Speaker (2012)
- Music by: Rick Ulfik
- Production companies: School of Visual Arts; Roy Frumkes Productions
- Distributed by: Off Hollywood
- Release date: January 19, 1981 (The Public Theater)
- Running time: 66 minutes (1981); 85 minutes (1989); 102 minutes (2012)
- Country: United States
- Language: English

Document of the Dead is a 1981 documentary film by American filmmaker Roy Frumkes that was largely shot during the production of the 1978 film Dawn of the Dead. Originally a 66-minute feature, it has since been expanded two times, first to 85 minutes in 1989, then to 102 minutes in 2012.

== Synopsis ==
Taking a look back from Romero's first television commercials onward, the documentary chronicles the career and stylistic techniques of Dawn of the Dead's director, George A. Romero.

== History ==
In 1977, Roy Frumkes, a teacher at New York's School of Visual Arts, wanted to make a teaching film on independent filmmaking. He was given $7,000 with plans to make a 25-minute feature. He was going to base it on the production of either Earl Owensby's Wolfman or George A. Romero's Dawn of the Dead. He decided to go with Dawn since Romero was already a proven independent film maker. The film, which was shot on 16mm, ended up being 66 minutes long and cost $33,000.

The film was premiered at Joseph Papp's The Public Theater on January 19, 1981 was subsequently entered into film festivals and won awards. But there weren't any offers good enough to properly distribute the film. In 1988, 10 years after filming, Frumkes was approached by a former student of his, Len Anthony, to release the film via his company Off Hollywood. Frumkes agreed, and Anthony asked him if he could update it "[b]ecause this is already old". Frumkes recorded additional interviews on the set of the film Romero was making at the time, Two Evil Eyes. This part of the film totalled 24 minutes, was shot on videotape and cost another $50,000. The film, now running 85 minutes, saw its first home video release when Off Hollywood released it on VHS in 1989.

The 85-minute version would see many more releases on home video. It was re-released in 1996 by Tee Dee Gee Distributing, and was also released on VHS in the UK, Australia, Germany and Japan. It was released on LaserDisc in Japan in 1995. Then, in 1998, it was released on DVD by Synapse Films as "The Special Edition", including an audio commentary, six minutes of deleted scenes, and never-before-seen interview segments from Two Evil Eyes. The next year, Synapse released a LaserDisc with the same content as the DVD. The film has since been included as a special feature on multiple editions of Dawn of the Dead, including on Anchor Bay Entertainment's 2004 Ultimate Edition DVD set and Arrow Films's 2010 DVD and Blu-ray releases.

2012 saw the film again expanded, this time to 102 minutes, featuring interviews performed through 2006. It was released as The Definitive Document of the Dead on DVD along with a new audio commentary. It was also released on a DVD/Blu-ray combo pack, with the Blu-ray features a high-definition transfer of the original 66 minute cut.
