= Spliced =

Spliced may refer to:

- Spliced, the result of rope splicing
- Spliced (film), a 2002 horror film
- Spliced (TV series), a cartoon series that started in 2009
