= David Early =

American film, stage and television actor

- Early in Dawn of the Dead, 1978
- Born: David L. Early; May 30, 1938; East Liberty, Pennsylvania, U.S.
- Died: March 23, 2013 (aged 74); Clearwater, Florida, U.S.
- Education: University of Pittsburgh
- Occupations: Film, stage and television actor

David L. Early (May 30, 1938 – March 23, 2013) was an American film, stage and television actor. He was best known for playing commentator Sidney Berman in George A. Romero's 1978 cult classic zombie film Dawn of the Dead.

== Life and career ==
Early was born in East Liberty, Pennsylvania. He attended and graduated from Peabody High School. After graduating, he served in the United States Navy, and earned his BS degree in elementary education at the University of Pittsburgh in 1971. He worked as a teacher, and appeared on stage. He began his screen career in 1978, playing commentator Sidney Berman in George A. Romero's cult classic zombie film Dawn of the Dead. In 1981, he appeared in the film Knightriders.

Later in his career, Early guest-starred in television programs including As the World Turns, Quincy, M.E., Tales from the Darkside and The West Wing. He also appeared in films such as The Silence of the Lambs, Creepshow, The Prince of Pennsylvania, The Dark Half, Zack and Miri Make a Porno, Houseguest, Innocent Blood and Passed Away. During his screen career, he worked as a puppeteer at the Lovelace Marionette Theater, and appeared in the stage play I'm Not Rappaport at the Allegheny Highlands Regional Theatre.

Early retired from acting in 2012, last appearing in the film One for the Money.

== Death ==
Early died from cancer on March 23, 2013, in Clearwater, Florida, at the age of 74.
