= The Grand Seduction =

- Directed by: Don McKellar
- Written by: Ken Scott; Michael Dowse
- Produced by: Barbara Doran; Roger Frappier; Jeff Sackman
- Starring: Brendan Gleeson; Taylor Kitsch; Gordon Pinsent; Liane Balaban; Mark Critch; Peter Keleghan; Mary Walsh; Margaret Killingbeck; Cathy Jones; Matt Watts
- Cinematography: Douglas Koch
- Edited by: Dominique Fortin
- Music by: Francois-Pierre Lue; Maxime Barzel; Paul-Étienne Côté
- Production companies: Voltage Pictures; Max Films; Morag Loves Company
- Distributed by: Entertainment One
- Release dates: 8 September 2013 (TIFF); 30 May 2014 (Canada)
- Running time: 115 minutes
- Country: Canada
- Language: English
- Budget: $12.7 million
- Box office: $4.3 million

The Grand Seduction is a 2013 Canadian comedy film directed by Don McKellar and written by Ken Scott and Michael Dowse. The film stars Taylor Kitsch, Brendan Gleeson, Liane Balaban and Gordon Pinsent. It is based on a 2003 French-Canadian film, La Grande Séduction.

The film was nominated in four categories for the Canadian Screen Awards, with Pinsent winning the award for Actor in a Supporting Role at the March 2014 ceremony.

== Plot ==
As a boy, Murray French tells the story of his father, a fisherman in the small community of Tickle Head, Newfoundland and Labrador. Murray feels the community has a shared sense of purpose and good work ethics, and he notes his parents' domestic bliss.

Decades later, Murray is one of many men who receive welfare cheques from Kathleen, the clerk at the post office, and cash them with Henry Tilley, manager of the bank. Adding to the indignity, his wife is leaving him for a job in St. John's. At a town meeting, he learns from the mayor that a petrochemical company is negotiating to build a factory. The company requires communities it operates in to have a resident doctor, and Tickle Head has failed to find one for the last eight years. Murray concludes that a factory is what the town needs, and a resident doctor is the solution.

The mayor and his family leave for St. John's, where he becomes a customs agent at the airport. He finds cocaine in the baggage of Paul Lewis, a plastic surgeon, and makes a deal: in exchange for Lewis's criminality being ignored, he will live in Tickle Head for a month. Murray arranges for the "seduction" of Lewis to a long-term contract, lying to the townspeople that this will guarantee that the factory is built in Tickle Head. He gets the townspeople to feign a game of cricket, Lewis's favourite sport, and taps Lewis's phone to learn more ways to entice him to stay.

The executive of the petrochemical company visits Tickle Head, telling Murray, posing as the mayor, that nearby St. Anne has made a more attractive offer, including a bribe. The executive demands another bribe of $100,000 to build the plant in Tickle Head, expressing concern that it is too small for a factory. At the bank, Murray applies for a loan to cover this amount, and is denied. He successfully pressures Henry into reconsidering, risking his job, by telling him that he could easily be replaced by an ATM.

Lewis is persuaded to stay by the townsfolk's deception and favourable attention, and the discovery that he has been cheated on with his best friend by his fiancée. When he agrees to become the resident doctor, giving a speech to the town where he praises their authenticity and integrity, Murray lies that another doctor has accepted the position. Afterwards, Kathleen tells the truth, causing him to confront Murray as the executive is signing the paperwork for the factory. Passionately convinced by Murray, Lewis concedes, and the paperwork is signed.

Later, the factory opens, bringing dignity back to Tickle Head. Murray reunites with his wife, and Henry, fired and replaced by an ATM, has found a new job. The film ends with a satisfying ending similar to the opening flashback.

== Cast ==
- Taylor Kitsch as Dr. Paul Lewis
- Brendan Gleeson as Murray French
- Liane Balaban as Kathleen
- Gordon Pinsent as Simon
- Mark Critch as Henry Tilley
- Peter Keleghan as Oil Executive
- Cathy Jones as Barbara French
- Mary Walsh as Vera
- Matt Watts as Frank Dalton
- Anna Hopkins as Helen (voice)
- Rhonda Rodgers as Samantha
- Lawrence Barry as Mayor Tom Fitzpatrick
- Percy Hynes White as Young Murray
- Sara Tilley as Miriam Mahoney

== Production ==
The Grand Seduction is based on the 2003 film Seducing Doctor Lewis (original French title La grande séduction). Shortly after it came out at Sundance Film Festival, an English-speaking version of the film was recommended. South Korea, Spain and Canada were all interested in doing a remake but only Canada, France and Italy ultimately developed remakes. Initially, Michael Dowse was to direct the film but he dropped out due to "artistic differences" with producer Roger Frappier. Ken Scott, who wrote the original script, was then attached at the direction of the film. He and Frappier planned the remake to be 80 per cent the same as the original. The film was expected to start shooting on 28 August 2011, but it got delayed. In April 2012, Scott left the project to focus on the remaking of his Starbuck film. In May 2012, Don McKellar came on board as director.

In 2011, there had been talks to have Robin Williams in the film but scheduling conflicts got in the way. Taylor Kitsch's and Brendan Gleeson's participation was confirmed in July 2012. Set in the fictional harbour of Tickle Head, principal photography started on 30 July 2012 in St. John's, Newfoundland and Labrador. The film was also shot in Red Cliffe, Bonavista Bay and in Trinity Bay, Newfoundland and Labrador. Filming wrapped in September 2012.

== Release ==
The film was premiered at the 2013 Toronto International Film Festival (TIFF). It was also selected as the opening film of the Atlantic Film Festival and the Calgary International Film Festival.

Upon the screening at TIFF, The Hollywood Reporter's John DeFore described the film as a "charming, wholly commercial little comedy" that is "formulaic but pleasing", and praised Gleeson's performance. In her overview of the films shown at TIFF, Monika Bartyzel of The Week wrote: "The Grand Seduction is a super-sweet community tale sparked by the inclusion of McKellar's wry humor. It's a film overflowing with charm from end to end."

=== Home media ===
The Grand Seduction was released on Blu-ray on 16 September 2014 and DVD on 7 October 2014.

== Reception ==
Overall, critical reception to the film has been mixed. On the review aggregator website Rotten Tomatoes, the film has an approval rating of 60% based on reviews from 68 critics. The website's consensus reads, "The Grand Seduction can't quite live up to the classic dramedies it seems to consciously evoke, but ambles sweetly enough to charm viewers in its own right." On Metacritic, the film has a weighted average score of 57/100, indicating mixed or average reviews, based on 20 critical reviews.

=== Box office ===
In its opening weekend, the film grossed $323,743 in 94 theatres in the United States, ranking #17 at the box office. By the end of its run, The Grand Seduction grossed $3,878,262.

=== Awards and accolades ===
Year	Result	Award	Category	Recipients
2013	Nominated	Tallinn Black Nights Film Festival	Best North American Independent Film	Don McKellar
2014	Nominated	Genie Awards	Best Motion Picture	Roger Frappier, Barbara Doran
2014	Nominated	Genie Awards	Best Adapted Screenplay	Ken Scott, Michael Dowse
2014	Nominated	Genie Awards	Best Performance by an Actor in a Leading Role	Brendan Gleeson
2014	Won	Genie Awards	Best Performance by an Actor in a Supporting Role	Gordon Pinsent
2014	Won	Directors Guild of Canada	Direction – Feature Film	Don McKellar
2014	Nominated	Directors Guild of Canada	Production Design – Feature Film	Guy Lalande
2014	Nominated	Directors Guild of Canada	Feature Film	Don McKellar, Guy Lalande, François Sénécal, Lynn Andrews
2014	Nominated	Canadian Screen Awards	Motion Picture	Roger Frappier, Barbara Doran

== Musical adaptation ==
In 2022, Tell Tale Harbour, a musical based on the film premiered at the Charlottetown Festival. The musical starred Alan Doyle.
