= Eat and Run =

- Directed by: Christopher Hart
- Written by: Christopher Hart; Stan Hart
- Produced by: Jack Briggs; Tom Field
- Starring: Ron Silver; R. L. Ryan
- Cinematography: Dyanna Taylor
- Edited by: Pamela Scott Arnold
- Music by: Scott Harper
- Distributed by: New World Pictures
- Release date: October 17, 1986
- Running time: 85 minutes
- Country: United States
- Language: English

Eat and Run is a 1986 American comedy science fiction horror film directed by Christopher Hart with the script by Christopher Hart and Stan Hart. The film starred Ron Silver, Sharon Schlarth and R. L. Ryan.

== Plot ==
A humanoid alien (R. L. Ryan) lands on Earth and soon discovers he likes to eat Italian people. Detective McSorely (Ron Silver), an incompetent police officer, is the only one who knows what's going on. The rest of the police force thinks McSorely has gone nuts, while the alien continues eating the Italian population of New York City.

== Cast ==
- Ron Silver as Mickey McSorely
- Sharon Schlarth as Judge Cheryl Cohen
- R. L. Ryan as Murray Creature
- John J. Fleming as The Police Captain
- Derek Murcott as Sorely McSorely
- Robert Silver as Pusher
- Mimi Cecchini as Grandmother
- Tony Moundroukas as Zepoli Kid
- Tom Mardirosian as Scarpetti
