= Street Trash =

1987 American horror film

- Theatrical poster
- Directed by: J. Michael Muro
- Written by: Roy Frumkes
- Produced by: Roy Frumkes
- Starring: Mike Lackey; R. L. Ryan; Vic Noto
- Cinematography: David Sperling
- Edited by: Dennis Werner
- Music by: Rick Ulfik
- Production companies: Street Trash Joint Venture; Lightning Pictures
- Distributed by: Lightning Pictures
- Release date: September 16, 1987
- Running time: 101 minutes
- Country: United States
- Language: English
- Budget: $100,000

Street Trash is a 1987 American black comedy body horror film directed by J. Michael Muro (credited as Jim Muro). It won the Silver Raven at the Brussels International Festival of Fantasy Film. The film has acquired a status as a cult classic independent horror-comedy and is one of a number of splatter films known as "melt movies".

In the film, a liquor store in Brooklyn starts selling cheap alcoholic beverages to local hobos. The beverages date to the 1920s, and are actually poisonous. While a local cop investigates the series of unexplained deaths, homeless veterans of the Vietnam War group together as a dangerous gang.

== Plot ==
The owner of a liquor store in Greenpoint, Brooklyn, New York City finds a case of cheap booze ("Tenafly Viper") in his basement. It is more than 60 years old and has gone bad, but he decides to sell it to the local hobos anyway. Unfortunately, anyone who drinks it melts away hideously. At the same time, two homeless brothers find different ways to cope with homelessness while they make their residence in a local junkyard while one employee, a female cashier and clerk (Jane Arakawa), frequently tends to both of them.

Meanwhile, an overzealous cop (Bill Chepil) is trying to get to the bottom of all the deaths, all the while trying to end the tyranny of a deranged Vietnam War veteran named Bronson (Vic Noto), who has made his self-proclaimed "kingdom" at the junkyard with a group of homeless vets under his command as his personal henchmen.

The film is littered with darkly comedic deaths and injuries. It also contains the notorious "severed privates" scene where a group of homeless people play catch with the severed genitals of one of their number, as he futilely attempts to recover it.

== Cast ==
- Mike Lackey as Fred
- Bill Chepil as Bill the cop
- Vic Noto as Bronson
- Mark Sferrazza as Kevin
- Jane Arakawa as Wendy
- Nicole Potter as Winette, Bronson's girlfriend
- R. L. Ryan as Frank Schnizer
- Clarence Jarmon as Burt
- Bernard Perlman as Wizzy
- Bruce Torbet as Paulie
- Miriam Zucker as Drunken Wench
- M. D'Jango Krunch as Ed, the liquor store owner
- Tony Darrow as Nick Duran, the Italian mobster
- Morty Storm as Black Suit
- Ian Benardo as Obnoxious kid
- James Lorinz as Italian restaurant doorman
- Julian Davis as The Weekend Warrior

== Production ==
Street Trash began as a 10 minute short film for then 21-year-old J. Michael Muro as his graduate thesis at the School of Visual Arts. Muro stated he was inspired by the Akira Kurosawa film Dodes'ka-den which depicted life in Japanese slums. After Muro managed to secure $30,000 to expand the short to feature length, he approached Roy Frumkes, a teacher at SVA, to write the script with Frumkes agreeing to do so as well as taking on a producer role as he believed he could obtain greater financing to help the commercial viability of the film. Muro tailored the script to film and make use of a Brooklyn based wrecking yard and adjacent warehouse belonging to Muro's father over the course of a 14 week shoot. The scene in which an overweight victim explodes, engineered by Dean Kartalas, was achieved by stuffing an explosive dummy with Drake's Cakes donated by the company as a product promotion.

In an NBR profile, Frumkes later said: "I wrote it to democratically offend every group on the planet, and as a result the youth market embraced it as a renegade work, and it played midnight shows." Bryan Singer worked on the film as a grip.

Deleted scenes include a junkyard dance sequence and a sub-plot involving the relationship between Fred (Mike Lackey) and Bronson; these sequences are included in the documentary Meltdown Memoirs.

== Release ==
The film was given a limited release theatrically in the United States by Lightning Pictures in June 1987. They also released the film on VHS the same year.

In 2005, Synapse Films marketed an all-new, digitally remastered version of the film. Included with the DVD were sticker-type "labels" of the Viper wine featured in the film. In 2006, a second release by Synapse Films was announced, featuring the documentary Meltdown Memoirs by writer Roy Frumkes. The feature includes interviews with most of the surviving cast and crew with the exception of Jane Arakawa. It also contains the original 16mm short version of Street Trash.

In 2010, Arrow Video released a two-DVD set in the UK featuring the documentary Meltdown Memoirs along with a previously unavailable featurette with Jane Arakawa and the booklet 42nd Street Trash: The Making of the Melt written by Calum Waddell. Since then, the movie has been released also on Blu-ray in numerous countries.

== Reception ==
Street Trash received little critical attention upon its initial release. The film holds a 62% rating on review site Rotten Tomatoes from 13 reviews, where critic Walter Goodman of The New York Times said of it, "It claims no redeeming social value, and you don't have to be a Supreme Court nominee to question whether the Founders could have foreseen anything like it when they wrote the First Amendment." Other reviewers on the platform consider Street Trash a crude but overlooked dark humor pioneer in the splatter film genre.

"It’s one of the most joyously reprehensible American movies ever made. It’s hard to be truly offended or even grossed out because the movie is so spirited and silly" - Daily Grindhouse

The film has since gained a cult following among horror fans on the internet. Chuck Bowen of Slant Magazine said (of the Street Trash Blu-ray), "Street Trash is a cult item that’s almost earnestly eager to offend, which is admittedly an odd thing to say about a film that features a prolonged scene in which a group of bums play hot potato with a man’s severed penis. It’s a 1980s American film, like Repo Man, that celebrates the proletariat’s resigned disenfranchisement as a badge of aesthetic honour." He went on to describe the film as a satire of the 1980's American political hierarchy, and rated it 4/5 stars. Review platform AllHorror said of Street Trash that they "personally loved it... the title might lead you to think its purpose is to shine a light on how trashy the homeless are, but it actually succeeds in showing how trashy everyone is. Brian Eggert of Deep Focus Review criticized the film's attempts at shock value, saying, "around the time an unsuspecting bum inadvertently urinates on another, causing the pee-victim to chop off the offending man’s penis, while at the same moment, not far away, a would-be rapist engages in necrophilia with the corpse of a gang-rape victim, I decided Street Trash wasn't my cup of tea... all I saw was a desperate attempt to get a reaction. My response to the film is the same with a bully or noisy child; I just roll my eyes and ignore it."

== Sequel ==
In 2023, it was announced that South African director Ryan Kruger was tapped to write and direct a remake of the 1987 film. However, Kruger decided not to make a full-on reboot, but rather a "spiritual sequel" that would be set in the same universe as the original but give it a futuristic edge. Kruger's "sequel" is set in 2050 Cape Town, where the government decide to wipe out the homeless community by unleashing a new brand of gas called "Tenafly Viper", named after the "Tenafly Viper" alcohol of the original.

The film featured an all-South African cast including Sean Cameron Michael, Gary Green, Joe Vaz, and Donna Cormack-Thomson.

Paying homage to the original film, Kruger was asked by producers Matt Manjourides and Justin A. Martell if he wanted to shoot the film in 35mm and use practical effects for the gore scenes rather than resort to computer generated imagery. The original film's writer, Roy Frumkes, served as one of the executive producers of the sequel. It was released theatrically on November 19, 2024 in the United States before going to streaming platform Screambox.
