= Dawn of the Dead (1978 film) =

1978 film by George A. Romero

- Theatrical release poster by Lanny Powers
- Directed by: George A. Romero
- Written by: George A. Romero
- Produced by: Richard P. Rubinstein
- Starring: David Emge; Ken Foree; Scott Reiniger; Gaylen Ross
- Cinematography: Michael Gornick
- Edited by: George A. Romero
- Music by: Goblin; Dario Argento
- Production company: Laurel Group
- Distributed by: United Film Distribution Company (US); Titanus (Italy)
- Release dates: September 1, 1978 (Italy); March 27, 1979 (Japan); April 7, 1979 (Dallas); April 13, 1979 (United States)
- Running time: 126 minutes (US); 119 minutes (Italy)
- Countries: United States; Italy
- Language: English
- Budget: $640,000 (Note: Although the film's budget has been reported by sources such as the American Film Institute and The Numbers as $1.5 million, Rubenstein revealed that this figure was an inflation used to maximize profits from selling the film to international distributors. Approximately $500,000 was used in the film's production. The $640,000 figure includes Romero and Rubenstein's salaries (worth approximately $50,000 altogether) and the costs of processing the film at Technicolor's facilities in New York City, which were deferred.)
- Box office: $66 million

Dawn of the Dead (Note: Dario Argento's version of the film was titled Zombi in Italy; English-language prints of this version use the title Zombie: Dawn of the Dead. In the United Kingdom, the film was initially released under the plural title Zombies: Dawn of the Dead.) is a 1978 zombie horror film written, directed, and edited by George A. Romero, and produced by Richard P. Rubinstein. An American-Italian international co-production, it is the second film in Romero's series of zombie films, and though it contains no characters or settings from the preceding film Night of the Living Dead (1968), it shows the larger-scale effects of a zombie apocalypse on society. In the film, a phenomenon of unidentified origin has caused the reanimation of the dead, who prey on human flesh. David Emge, Ken Foree, Scott Reiniger, and Gaylen Ross star as survivors of the outbreak who barricade themselves inside a suburban shopping mall during mass hysteria.

Romero waited to make another zombie film after Night of the Living Dead for several years to avoid being stereotyped as a horror director. Upon visiting Monroeville Mall in Monroeville, Pennsylvania, with a friend whose company managed the complex, he decided to use the location as the basis for the film's story. The project came to the attention of Italian filmmaker Dario Argento who, along with his brother Claudio and producer Alfredo Cuomo, agreed to co-finance the film in exchange for its international distribution rights. Argento also consulted with Romero during the scriptwriting phase. Principal photography on Dawn of the Dead took place between November 1977 and February 1978 on location in Monroeville and Pittsburgh. The special make-up effects were created by Tom Savini, whose work on the film led to an extensive career creating similar effects for other horror films. In post-production, Romero and Argento edited separate versions of the film for their respective markets. Argento's version features a progressive rock score composed and performed by his frequent collaborators Goblin, while Romero's cut primarily favors stock cues from the De Wolfe Music Library.

Following its Italian premiere on September 1, 1978, Dawn of the Dead was released in other markets the following year. Despite facing difficulties with various national censorship boards – in the United States, it was released unrated to improve its commercial prospects after it was given an X by the Motion Picture Association of America, and in Britain it was liable for seizure during the 1980s "video nasties" moral panic – the film proved to be a major success at the box office, grossing $66 million worldwide against its estimated budget of $640,000. Noted for its satirical portrayal of consumerism, Dawn of the Dead has received widespread critical acclaim since its initial release, and is widely considered to be one of the greatest horror films ever made, as well as the greatest zombie film. Like its predecessor, it has garnered a large, international cult following. In 2008, it was chosen by Empire magazine as one of The 500 Greatest Movies of All Time, along with Night of the Living Dead.

Dawn of the Dead was followed by four official sequels, beginning with 1985's Day of the Dead, and a separate series of unofficial Italian-made sequels, beginning with 1979's Zombi 2. It has also inspired a 2004 remake film directed by Zack Snyder, as well as numerous parodies and pop culture references in other media such as Shaun of the Dead, Dead Rising, and Left 4 Dead.

== Plot ==
In the United States an epidemic of a virus has begun, turning the infected into aggressive zombies. At the dawn of the crisis, it has been reported that millions of people have died and reanimated. Despite the government's best efforts, social order is collapsing. While rural communities have natural barriers, such as Johnstown, and the National Guard have been effective in fighting the zombie hordes in open country, urban centers have descended into chaos.

At WGON-TV, a television studio in Philadelphia, traffic reporter Stephen and his pregnant girlfriend, producer Francine, are planning to steal the station's helicopter to escape the city. Across town, Philadelphia Police Department SWAT officer Roger and his team raid a low-income housing project, whose mostly black and Latino tenants are defying the martial law of delivering their dead to the National Guard. The tenants and the officers exchange gunfire as the officers try to gain entry, and indiscriminate attacks by racist officers and the reanimated dead exacerbate the resulting chaos. Roger encounters an officer from another unit, Peter. As the SWAT team successfully dispatch the zombies, a disillusioned Roger suggests that he and Peter desert and join up with Stephen (who is Roger's friend) in escaping the city.

Roger and Peter join Francine and Stephen at a police dock and then leave Philadelphia in a stolen WGON-TV news helicopter. Following some close calls while stopping for fuel, the group comes across a shopping mall, and decide to remain there since there is plenty of food, medicine, and all kinds of consumables. Roger, Peter and Stephen camouflage the entrance to the stairwell leading to their safe room and block the mall entrances with trucks to keep the undead from penetrating. This involves driving through crowds of zombies, who attack the trucks. Roger becomes reckless and is soon bitten by the zombies.

After clearing the mall of zombies, the group builds a hidden safe room as a fallback in case of future attacks, before settling into a hedonistic lifestyle with all the goods available to them. Roger eventually succumbs to his wounds and dies; when he reanimates, Peter shoots him in the head and buries his body in the mall. Months later, all emergency broadcast transmissions cease, suggesting that the government has collapsed. Now isolated, the three load some supplies into the helicopter, in case they might need to leave suddenly. Francine gets Stephen to teach her how to fly in case he is killed or incapacitated.

A nomadic biker gang sees the helicopter in flight and breaks into the mall, destroying the barriers and allowing hundreds of zombies back inside. Despite having a fallback plan should the mall be attacked, Stephen, consumed by territorial rage, takes matters into his own hands by firing on the looters, beginning a protracted battle. On their way out, straggling bikers are overwhelmed and eaten by the zombies. Stephen tries to hide in the elevator shaft, but gets shot and subsequently mauled by roaming zombies. When Stephen reanimates, he instinctively returns to the safe room and leads the undead to Francine and Peter. Peter kills the undead Stephen while Francine escapes to the roof. Peter, not wanting to leave, locks himself in a room and contemplates suicide. When the zombies burst in, he has a change of heart and fights his way up to the roof, where he joins Francine. Having escaped and low on fuel, the two then fly away in the helicopter to an uncertain future.

== Cast ==
- David Emge as Stephen
- Ken Foree as Peter
- Scott Reiniger as Roger
- Gaylen Ross as Francine

Director George A. Romero makes an uncredited appearance as a WGON TV director. Assistant director and Romero's future-wife—Christine Forrest—portrays his assistant. Also featured at the WGON TV station are David Crawford as Dr. James Foster, David Early as commentator Sidney Berman and Daniel Dietrich as station manager Dan Givens. Future Romper Room hostess Molly McClosky makes an uncredited appearance as a station worker. Later sequences depicting an emergency TV network feature Howard Smith as an unnamed commentator and recurring Romero collaborator Richard France as Dr. Millard Rausch, referred to in the credits as "Scientist".

Featured among the motorcycle raiders are Rudy Ricci as their leader, brothers and frequent Romero collaborators Tony and Pasquale Buba, and Taso N. Stavrakis. Tom Savini, the film's make-up artist, also appears as Blades, a machete-wielding raider. Joseph Pilato, who would later be cast in Romero's Day of the Dead (1985), plays the leader of group of police officers evacuating by boat, although most of his performance was cut from the theatrical release. Other police officers in the film include James A. Baffico as Wooley, with his wife Joey Baffico having an uncredited role as a zombie who attacks Roger. Longtime Romero collaborator John Amplas, who also served as the film's casting director, makes an uncredited appearance as one of the apartment tenants who engages in a gunfight with the police.

== Production ==
=== Development ===
The history of Dawn of the Dead began in 1974, when George A. Romero was invited by friend Mark Mason of Oxford Development Company—whom Romero knew from an acquaintance at his alma mater, Carnegie Mellon—to visit the Monroeville Mall, which Mason's company managed. After showing Romero hidden parts of the mall, during which Romero noted the bliss of the consumers, Mason jokingly suggested that someone would be able to survive in the mall, should an emergency ever occur. With this inspiration, Romero began to write the screenplay for the film.

Romero and his producer, Richard P. Rubinstein, were unable to procure any domestic investors for the new project. By chance, word of the sequel reached Italian horror director Dario Argento. A fan of Night of the Living Dead and an early critical proponent of the film, Argento was eager to help the horror classic receive a sequel. He met Romero and Rubinstein, helping to secure financing in exchange for international distribution rights. Argento invited Romero to Rome so he would have a change of scenery while writing the screenplay. The two could also discuss plot developments. Romero was able to secure the availability of the Monroeville Mall as well as additional financing through his connections with the mall's owners at Oxford Development. Once the casting was completed, principal shooting was scheduled to begin in Pennsylvania on November 13, 1977.

=== Filming ===
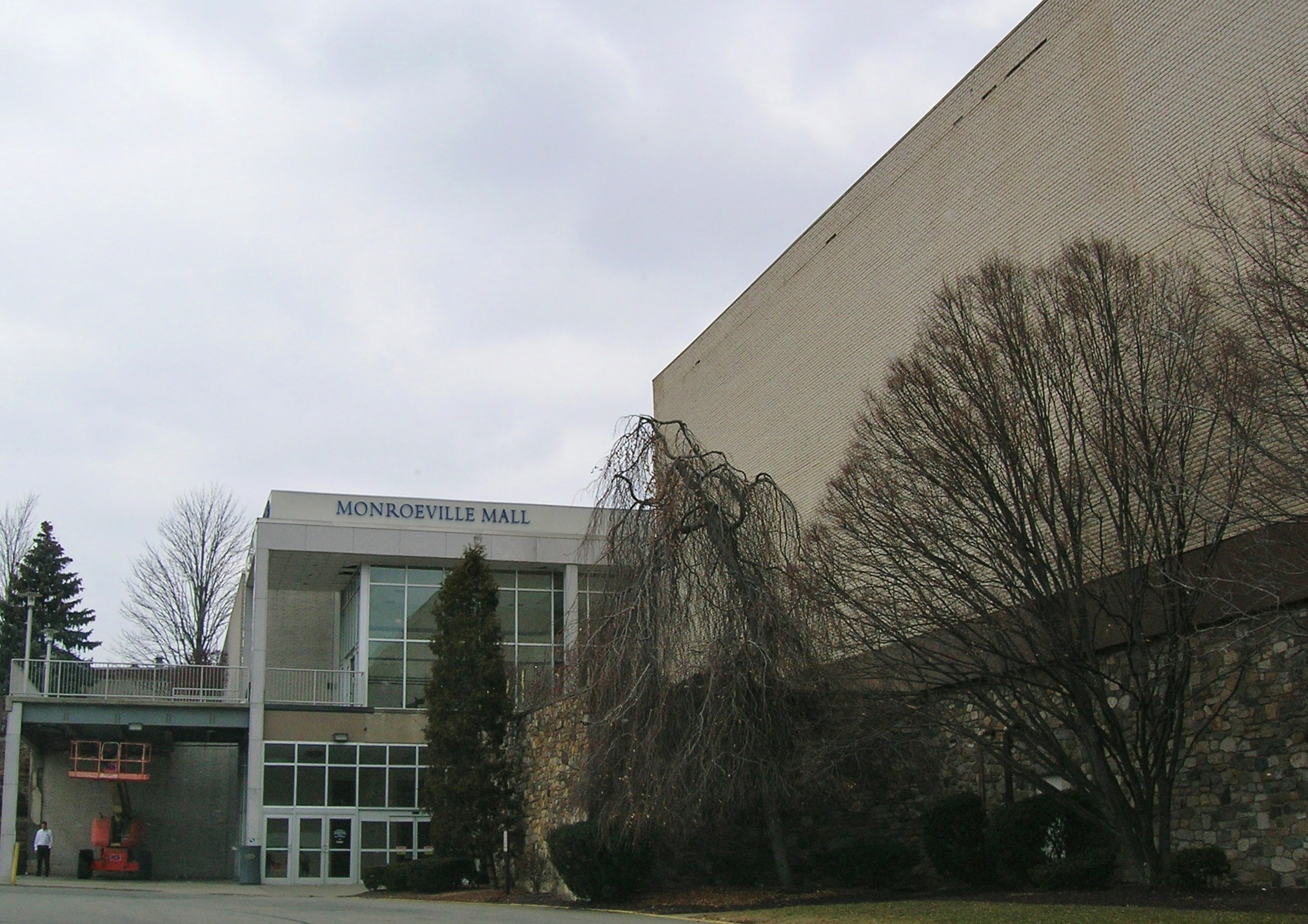
Monroeville Mall Entrance in 2009

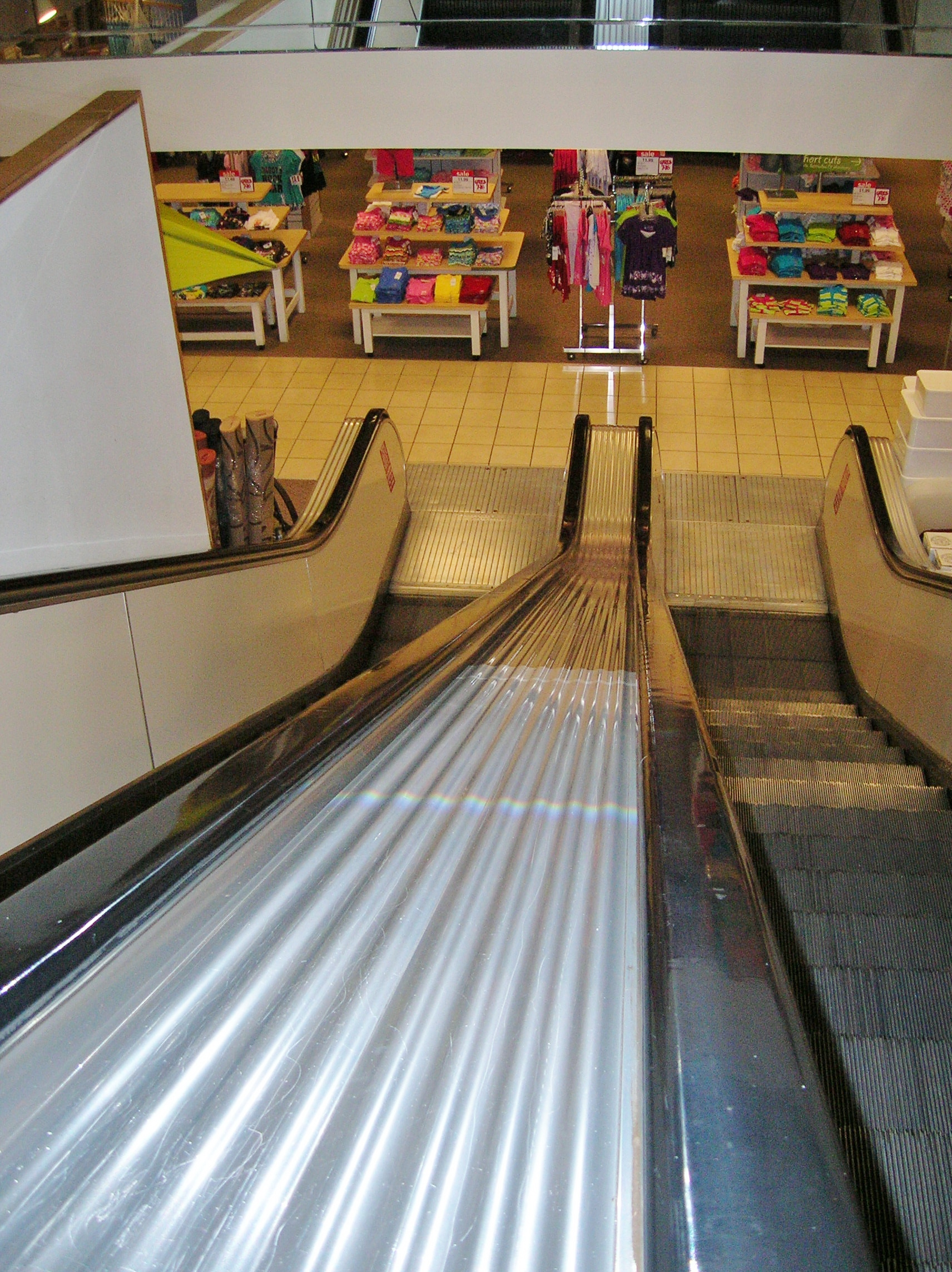
Escalator in JC Penney that the character Roger (Scott Reiniger) slides down in the scene where he and Peter (Ken Foree) are gathering supplies (photo taken in 2009)

Principal photography for Dawn of the Living Dead (its working title at the time) began on November 13, 1977, at the Monroeville Mall in Monroeville, Pennsylvania. Use of an actual, open shopping mall during the Christmas shopping season caused numerous time constraints. Filming began nightly once the mall closed, starting at 11 PM and ending at 7 AM, when automated music came on. As December arrived, the production decided against having the crew remove and replace the Christmas decorations—a task that had proved to be too time-consuming. Filming was shut down during the last three weeks of the year to avoid the possible continuity difficulties and lost shooting time. Production would resume on January 3, 1978. During the break in filming, Romero took the opportunity to begin editing his existing footage.

The airfield scenes were filmed at the Harold W. Brown Memorial Airfield in Monroeville, an airport located about two miles from the mall. The scenes of the group's hideout at the top of the mall were filmed on a set built at Romero's then-production company, The Latent Image. The elevator shaft was located there as well, as no such area of the mall actually existed. The gun store was also not located in the mall—for filming, the crew used Firearms Unlimited, a shop that existed in the East Liberty district of Pittsburgh at the time. The police dock scene was filmed in downtown Pittsburgh right next the Monongahela River at 1 S. 6th St. The building, landing pad, and pumps are long gone, and the location is now an outdoor art gallery called The Color Park. The truck yard scene was filmed at the B&P Motor Express Co. which is now a First Student school bus company in Irwin, PA, about 22 minutes from the Monroeville Mall.

Principal photography on Dawn of the Dead ended in February 1978, and Romero's process of editing would begin. By using numerous angles during the filming, Romero allowed himself an array of possibilities during editing—choosing from these many shots to reassemble into a sequence that could dictate any number of responses from the viewer simply by changing an angle or deleting or extending portions of scenes. This amount of superfluous footage is evidenced by the numerous international cuts, which in some cases affects the regional version's tone and flow.

==== Alternative ending ====
According to the original screenplay, Peter and Francine were to kill themselves, Peter by shooting himself and Fran by sticking her head into the path of the rotating main helicopter blades. The ending credits would run over a shot of the helicopter blades turning until the engine winds down, implying that the two would not have gotten far if they had chosen to escape. During production, it was decided to change the ending of the film.

Much of the lead-in to the two suicides remains in the film, as Francine leans out of the helicopter upon seeing the zombies approach, and Peter puts a gun to his head, ready to shoot himself. An additional scene, showing a zombie having the top of its head cut off by the helicopter blades (thus foreshadowing Francine's suicide) was included early in the film. Romero has stated that the original ending was scrapped before being shot, although behind-the-scenes photos show the original version was at least tested. The head appliance made for Francine's suicide was instead used in the opening SWAT raid, made-up to resemble an African American male and blown apart by a shotgun blast.

==== Make-up and effects ====
An example of the bright hue of the fake blood, gray face make-up, and special effects in Dawn of the Dead

Special effect of an exploding head during the tenement building scene

Tom Savini, who had been offered the chance to provide special effects and make-up for Romero's first zombie film, Night of the Living Dead, before being drafted into the Vietnam War, made his debut as an effects artist on Dawn of the Dead. Savini had been known for his make-up in horror for some time, prior to Dawn of the Dead, and in his book explaining special effects techniques, Bizarro, explains how his time in Vietnam influenced his craft. He had a crew of eight to assist in applying gray makeup to two to three hundred extras each weekend during the shoot. One of his assistants during production was Joseph Pilato, who played a police captain in the film and would go on to play the lead villain in the film's sequel, Day of the Dead, Captain Henry Rhodes.

The makeup for the multitudes of extras in the film was a basic blue or gray tinge to the face of each extra. Some featured zombies, who would be seen close-up or on-screen longer than others, had more time spent on their look. Many of the featured zombies became part of the fanfare, with nicknames based upon their look or activity—such as Machete Zombie, Sweater Zombie, and Nurse Zombie. "Sweater Zombie" Clayton Hill was described by a crew member as "one of the most convincing zombies of the bunch" citing his skill at maintaining his stiff pose and rolling his eyes back into his head, including heading down the wrong way in an escalator while in character.

A cast of Ross' head that was to be used in the original ending of the film (involving a suicide rather than the escape scene finally used) ended up as an exploding head during the tenement building scene. The head, filled with food scraps, was shot with an actual shotgun to get the head to explode. One of the unintentional standout effects was the bright, fluorescent color of the fake blood that was used in the film. Savini was an early opponent of the blood, produced by 3M, but Romero thought it added to the film, claiming it emphasised the comic book feel of the movie.

Savini rented a skeleton from Larry Wintersteller, who acquired it in the early 1970s and knew that it was a real skeleton. Wintersteller sold the skeleton to Marilynn Wick, who was unaware that it was real. The skeleton was on display at a costume shop in Allegheny County, Pennsylvania, before County Coroner Joshua Perper confiscated it in 1982. Fake flesh from the skeleton's use in Dawn of the Dead was still on the skeleton when Perper confiscated it. The skeleton was buried on March 19, 1983, and was reported to have belong to a woman who died 100 years before at age 35.

==== Music ====
The film's music varies with Romero's and Argento's cuts. For Romero's theatrical version, musical cues and selections were chosen from the De Wolfe Music Library, a compilation of stock music scores and cues. In the montage scene featuring the hunters and National Guard, the song played in the background is "'Cause I'm a Man" by the Pretty Things. The song was first released on the group's LP Electric Banana. The music heard playing in a sequence in the mall and over the film's end credits is an instrumental titled "The Gonk"—a polka style tune from the De Wolfe Music Library written by Herbert Chappell, with a chorus of zombie moans added by Romero.

For Argento's international cut, the Italian director used the band Goblin (incorrectly credited as "The Goblins") extensively. Goblin is a four-piece Italian progressive rock band that mostly provides contract work for film soundtracks. Argento, who received a credit for original music alongside Goblin, collaborated with the group to get music for his cut of the film. Romero used three of their pieces in his theatrical release version. The Goblin score would later find its way onto a Dawn of the Dead-inspired film, Hell of the Living Dead. Many tracks would also appear in the Tsui Hark film Dangerous Encounters of the First Kind. The version of Dawn released on video in the mid-nineties under the label "Director's Cut" does not use most of the Goblin tracks, as they had not been completed at the time of that edit.

=== Post-production ===
Dawn of the Dead has received a number of re-cuts and re-edits, due mostly to Argento's rights to edit the film for international foreign language release. Romero controlled the final cut of the film for English-language territories. In addition, the film was edited further by censors or distributors in certain countries. Romero, acting as the editor for his film, completed a hasty 139-minute version of the film (now known as the Extended, or previously erroneously as Director's Cut) for premiere at the 1978 Cannes Film Market. This was later pared down to 126 minutes for the US theatrical release. The US theatrical cut of the film earned the taboo rating of X because of its graphic violence. Rejecting this rating, Romero and the producers chose to release the film unrated to help the film's commercial success. United Film Distribution Company eventually agreed to release it domestically in the United States. The film was refused classification in Australia twice: in its theatrical release in 1978 and once again in 1979. The cuts presented to the Australian Classification Board were Argento's cut and Romero's cut, respectively. Dawn of the Dead was finally released there by United Artists, with an R18+ rating following six minutes worth of cuts compared to Romero's US version, in February 1980.

Internationally, Argento controlled the Euro cut for non-English speaking countries. The version he created clocked in at 119 minutes. It included changes such as more music from Goblin than the cuts completed by Romero, removal of some expository scenes, and a faster cutting pace. There are, however, extra lines of dialogue and gore shots that are not in either of Romero's edits. It actually debuted nearly nine months before the US theatrical cut. Dawn of the Dead was released under different names in Europe: in Italy as Zombi: L'alba dei Morti Viventi (Zombies: Dawn of the Living Dead), followed in March 1979 in France as Zombie: Le Crépuscule des Morts Vivants (Zombie: Twilight of the Living Dead), in Spain as Zombi: El Regreso de los Muertos Vivientes (Zombie: Return of the Living Dead), in the Netherlands as Zombie: In De Greep van de Zombies (In the Grip of the Zombies), in Germany by Constantin Film as Zombie, and in Denmark as Zombie: Rædslernes Morgen (Zombie: The Morning of Horrors).

Dawn of the Dead was successful internationally. Its success in then-West Germany earned it the Golden Screen Award, given to films that have at least three million admissions within 18 months of release. A majority of these versions were released on DVD in the 2004 Special Edition, and have previously been released on VHS. The freelance photographer Richard Burke, working for Pittsburgh Magazine, released in May 2010 the first exclusive behind-the-scenes photos from the set.

== Release ==
=== Theatrical ===
On September 1, 1978, a 119-minute cut of the film created for non-English speaking countries premiered in Turin, Italy under the title Zombi, with Dario Argento in attendance. The same cut would open in Japan the weekend on March 27, 1979, and immediately top its box office there. A 126-minute cut for English-language speaking territories premiered in the United States on April 7, 1979, at the USA Film Festival in Dallas, Texas, having been selected for the event by film critic Roger Ebert. The following weekend, United Film Distribution opened the same cut in seventeen Pittsburgh cinemas, and continued with a wider rollout over the next month. The picture opened in New York City on April 20, and in Los Angeles on May 11.

=== Home media ===
In 2004, after numerous VHS, LaserDisc and DVD releases of several different versions of the film from various companies, Anchor Bay Entertainment released a definitive Ultimate Edition DVD box set of Dawn of the Dead, following a single-disc U.S. theatrical cut released earlier in the year. The set features all three widely available versions of the film, along with different commentary tracks for each version, documentaries and extras. Also re-released with the DVD set was Roy Frumkes' Document of the Dead, which chronicled the making of Dawn of the Dead and Romero's career to that point. The Ultimate Edition earned a Saturn Award for Best Classic Film Release.

The U.S. theatrical cut of Dawn of the Dead was released on Blu-ray by Anchor Bay on October 7, 2007, in the U.S. It was released on Blu-ray in the United Kingdom by Arrow Video, which includes the theatrical cut and two DVDs with the Cannes and Argento cut. An Australian Blu-ray was released by Umbrella Entertainment. Reportedly, the film went out of print on home media as a result of Rubinstein significantly increasing its home media licensing fees. Some speculate that this was due to a desire to recoup the $6 million he spent producing a 3D conversion of the film.

In November 2016, Koch Media, under their Midnight Factory line, released a six-disc Collector's Edition Blu-ray package for the Italian market. This release includes the Argento cut in 4K Ultra HD format, as well as both the original 1.85:1 theatrical framing and 1.33:1 full-frame of the Argento cut, as well as the original theatrical cut and the extended Cannes cut of the film in high definition Blu-ray format. Koch also released a four-disc set, omitting the UHD and 1.33:1 discs, and a single Blu-ray of the European cut.

In 2018, XT Video released the complete version of the film for Blu-ray, which is a fusion of the long and Italian versions of the film, plus cut scenes.

In November 2020, British home media distributor Second Sight Films released a limited edition box set of the film in separate Blu-ray and 4K Blu-ray formats, featuring the theatrical, Cannes and Argento cuts of the film. For this release, all three cuts were remastered and restored in 4K resolution, with the theatrical and Cannes versions presented on the 4K Blu-ray sets in HDR10+. The theatrical and Cannes cuts were restored from the original camera negative by Second Sight at Final Frame New York and London under the supervision and approval of Michael Gornick, the film's cinematographer. The audio, presented in Mono (with additional Stereo and 5.1 Surround tracks for the theatrical cut), was restored from the negative's optical soundtrack. Scenes exclusive to the Cannes version were restored using that version's color reversal internegative, while the Argento version, presented in SDR, was restored from its interpositive, and similarly features Mono, Stereo and 5.1 Surround audio tracks. The box set also contains a Blu-ray disc with a collection of original and archival bonus features; three CDs featuring Goblin's original soundtrack and a compilation of the De Wolfe Music cues featured in the theatrical and Cannes cuts; Dawn of the Dead: Dissecting the Dead, a hardcover book containing essays, artwork and other archival features; and a paperback copy of the film's novelisation.

=== 3D re-release ===
Work on a 3D conversion of the film was begun in 2007 under the supervision of Rubinstein. It was completed in 2013 at a reported cost of $6 million. The 3D version had its world premiere in October 2013 at the Busan International Film Festival. In October 2022, it finally received a wider release, exclusively in 250 Regal Cinemas theaters. It was screened again at five North American theaters as part of a 45th anniversary re-release of the film in 2024.

== Reception ==
=== Box office ===
Dawn of the Dead performed well thanks both to commercial advertising and word-of-mouth. Ad campaigns and posters declared the film "the most intensely shocking motion picture experience for all times". The film earned $900,000 on its opening weekend in the United States. After four weeks it had grossed $5.1 million in the United States and Canada, and went on to gross $16 million with rentals of $6.8 million.

The film also performed well internationally, grossing $1.5 million in six Japanese cinemas over a period of 42 days and over $1 million in Italy, and by October 1979 it had grossed $24 million worldwide. The Numbers claims it had an international gross of $49.9 million, which with a domestic gross of $16 million, gives a worldwide total of $66 million, making it the most profitable film in the Dead series.

== Accolades ==
- Saturn Award — Nomination — Best Make-up (1980)
- Golden Screen — Win — Golden Screen Award (1980)
- Satellite Award — Nomination — Golden Satellite Award for Best Overall DVD (2005)
- Saturn Award — Win — Best DVD Classic Film Release (2005)
- Online Film and Television Association — Win — OFTA Film Hall of Fame - Motion Picture (2024)

=== Critical reception ===
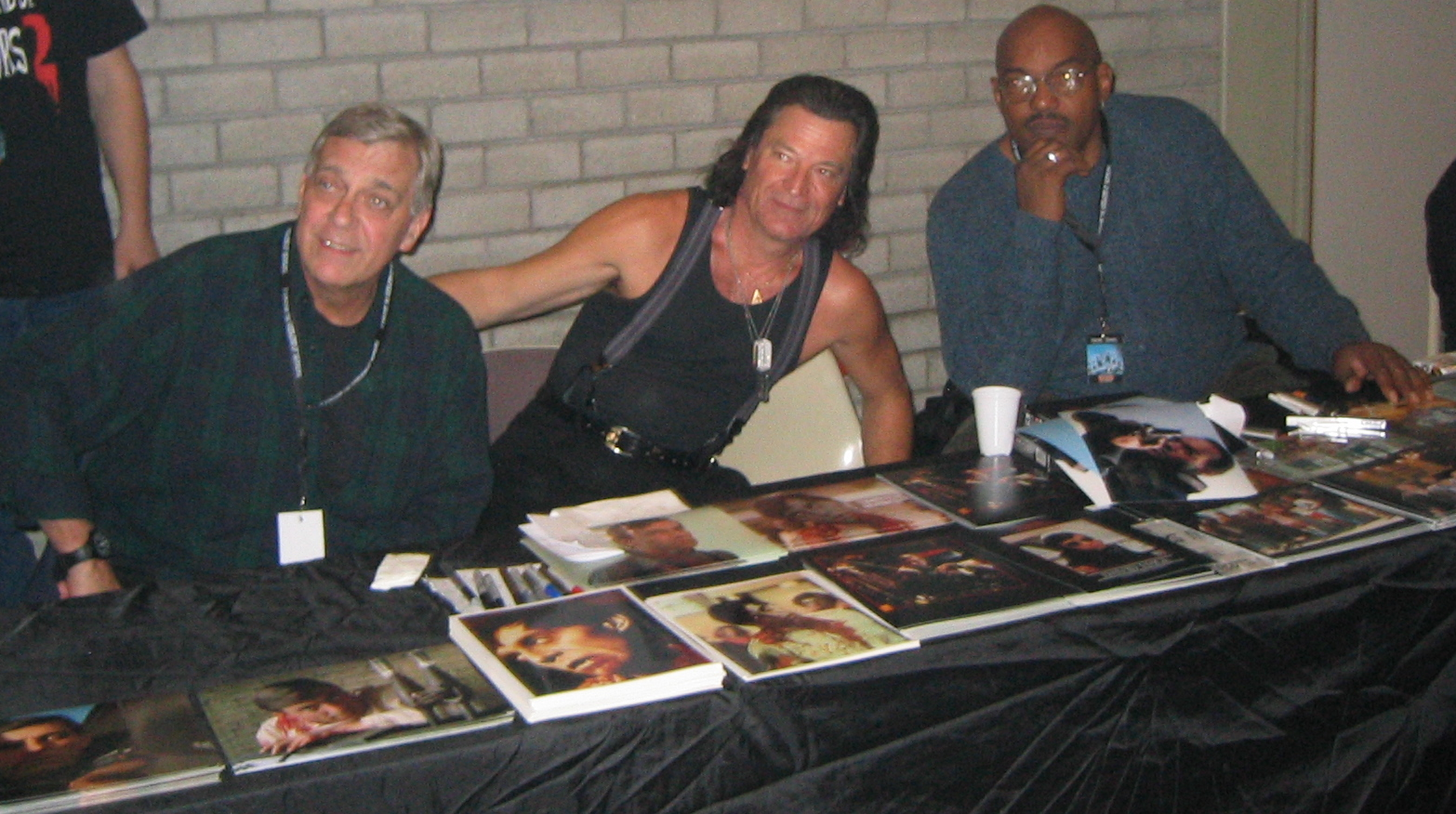
Cast members David Emge, Joseph Pilato and Ken Foree at a Dead series convention

Rotten Tomatoes, a review aggregator, reports that 92% of 59 surveyed critics gave the film a positive review. The average rating is 8.70/10. The site's critical consensus reads: "One of the most compelling and entertaining zombie films ever, Dawn of the Dead perfectly blends pure horror and gore with social commentary on material society." Roger Ebert of the Chicago Sun-Times gave it four out of four stars and proclaimed it "one of the best horror films ever made." While conceding Dawn of the Dead to be "gruesome, sickening, disgusting, violent, brutal and appalling," Ebert said that "nobody ever said art had to be in good taste." Steve Biodrowski of Cinefantastique praised the film, calling it a "broader" version of Night of the Living Dead, and gave particular credit to the acting and themes explored: "the acting performances are uniformly strong; and the script develops its themes more explicitly, with obvious satirical jabs at modern consumer society, as epitomized by the indoor shopping mall where a small band of human survivors take shelter from the zombie plague sweeping the country." He went on to say that Dawn of the Dead was a "savage (if tongue-in-cheek) attack on the foibles of modern society", showcasing explicit gore and horror and turning them into "a form of art". Gene Siskel liked the movie as well, giving it 3 stars in his Chicago Tribune print review and specifically praising George Romero's satirical view of indoor shopping malls relative to a zombie apocalypse.

Similar to the preceding Night of the Living Dead, some critical reviewers did not like the gory special effects. Particularly displeased at the large amount of gore and graphic violence was The New York Times critic Janet Maslin, who claimed she walked out after the first fifteen minutes due to "a pet peeve about flesh-eating zombies who never stop snacking," and Gene Shalit of NBC's Today show dismissed it as "Yawn of the Living." Others, particularly Variety, attacked the film's writing, suggesting that the violence and gore detract from any development of the characters, making them "uninteresting", resulting in a loss of impact. Variety wrote: "Dawn pummels the viewer with a series of ever-more-grisly events — shootings, knifings, flesh tearings — that make Romero's special effects man, Tom Savini, the real "star" of the film—the actors are as woodenly uninteresting as the characters they play." Pauline Kael wrote that, in contrast to the "truly frightening" Night of the Living Dead, "you begin to laugh with relief that you're not being emotionally challenged or even affected; [Dawn of the Dead is] just a gross-out." Leslie Halliwell of Halliwell's Film Guide stated that the film was "occasionally laughable, otherwise sickening or boring." Vincent Canby of The New York Times dismissed it as "fake mayhem and not worth getting exercised about," adding: "Here is a picture that anyone can walk out of with head held high and a clear and untroubled conscience."

The film is often cited as being one of the few sequels that are superior to the original. The film was selected as one of The 500 Greatest Movies of All Time by Empire magazine in 2008. It was also named as one of The Best 1000 Movies Ever Made, a list published by The New York Times. In 2016, James Charisma of Playboy ranked the film #10 on a list of 15 Sequels That Are Way Better Than The Originals. The 25th anniversary issue of Fangoria named it the best horror film of 1979 (although it was released a year earlier), and Entertainment Weekly ranked it #27 on a list of "The Top 50 Cult Films." Film.com and Filmsite.org rated it as one of the best films of 1978. In 2024, Paste Magazine ranked Dawn of the Dead number 8 on its list of the 100 greatest horror movies. Rotten Tomatoes lists the film on its 100 Best Zombie Movies, Ranked by Tomatometer.

== Remake ==
Released in 2004, the remake of Dawn of the Dead was directed by Zack Snyder (in his directorial debut) and written by James Gunn. It stars Sarah Polley, Ving Rhames, and Jake Weber with cameos from original cast members Ken Foree, Scott Reiniger, and Tom Savini.

== Novelization ==
George Romero and Susanna Sparrow's paperback book based on the film was released in 1978. It was reissued, with a new introduction by Simon Pegg, on May 26, 2015, by Gallery Books. It was reissued again in November 2020, with Pegg's introduction and new artwork, as part of Second Sight Films' limited edition Blu-ray release of the film.

== See also ==
- List of American films of 1978
- List of cult films
- List of Italian films of 1978
- List of zombie films
- Shaun of the Dead
