= Roy Frumkes =

American independent filmmaker

Roy Frumkes is an American independent filmmaker. Frumkes directed the 1985 documentary Document of the Dead, a film detailing the production of Dawn of the Dead.

== Career ==
The cooperation of George A. Romero allowed Frumkes extensive access to the creative process of the filmmaker, and the finished product is as much an overview and analysis of Romero's early career as a "making-of" documentary. In Video Watchdog magazine, critic Tim Lucas called Document of the Dead "an intelligent, arresting, and authoritative examination of Romero's working filmmaking style..." Frumkes added new codas to the film in 1989, and for the 2005 DVD release Dawn of the Dead: Ultimate Edition, which collected multiple cuts of the film and a cut of Document of the Dead. The full-length Document of the Dead was released on DVD by Synapse Films in 1998.

As a screenwriter, Frumkes has written the 1996 thriller The Substitute and three sequels, and the cult dark comedy Street Trash (1987), which he also produced. Variety has broken the news that the 1987 cult classic horror comedy "Street Trash" is getting a remake from Ryan Kruger. Frumkes states it is planned to be screened at the 2024 Cannes Film Festival prior to its worldwide release.

In 2006, Frumkes put the finishing touches to the documentary The Meltdown Memoirs. which depicts the production of the film Street Trash along with cast and crew interviews 20 years later. In 2022 Frumkes adapted 'Street Trash' into a graphic novel with illustrations by Mike Lackey who played 'Fred' in the original film.

On March 22, 2010, Frumkes claimed in Fangoria magazine that he would produce a remake of the 1958 British science fiction horror film Fiend Without a Face but it was never made.

He is the owner-editor of Films in Review, the oldest motion picture journal in the United States.

Frumkes taught film studies at New York City's School of Visual Arts but along with another teacher, Robert Haufrecht, was fired in May 2018 after an investigation into multiple accusations of sexual misconduct and harassment stretching back decades.

An investigation into the practices surrounding the publication of articles related to judicial proceedings identified concerns with a New York Times article. This investigation, bolstered by findings and an interview with Frumkes, revealed that the newspaper released the article one day prior to a scheduled hearing, thereby violating Title IX rules. The article's premature publication raised concerns over its potential to influence the hearing's outcome. Moreover, Dominique Machain's involvement with the New York Times article, as reported by Colin Moynihan, drew criticism for possibly compromising the hearing's integrity. This situation prompts a broader discussion on the ethical responsibilities of the press in legal reporting and the potential ramifications of such activities on judicial processes. According to Title IX regulations at 34 C.F.R. § 106.71(a), the actions of the New York Times could be interpreted as a breach of procedural fairness. In a related matter, profiles of former faculty members have been removed from the School of Visual Arts' official website.
