= Jared Van Snellenberg =

Canadian actor and psychiatrist (born 1980)

- Van Snellenberg in 2026
- Born: December 26, 1980 (age 45); Vancouver, British Columbia, Canada
- Occupation: Associate Professor

Academic background
- Education: Simon Fraser University (BA); Columbia University (MA, MPhil, PhD)
- Thesis: An Investigation of the Neural Correlates of Working Memory in Healthy Individuals and Individuals With Schizophrenia (2012)
- Doctoral advisor: Edward E. Smith

Academic work
- Discipline: Psychology; Psychiatry
- Sub-discipline: Functional neuroimaging Functional magnetic resonance imaging Working memory Schizophrenia
- Institutions: Renaissance School of Medicine at Stony Brook University

Jared X. Van Snellenberg (born December 26, 1980) is a Canadian psychiatry professor focusing on schizophrenia neuroimaging research and former child actor. Originally known for his role in Happy Gilmore, Van Snellenberg now works as an Associate Professor of Psychiatry and Behavioral Health at the Renaissance School of Medicine at Stony Brook University.

== Early life and education ==
Jared Van Snellenberg was born in Vancouver, British Columbia, Canada. He earned a Bachelor of Arts degree in Psychology from Simon Fraser University. He then earned a Master of Arts, Master of Philosophy, and PhD in Psychology from Columbia University, advised by Professor Edward E. Smith.

== Career ==
Prior to his academic career, he was first known for his role as Adam Sandler's first caddy in Happy Gilmore, with his character drawing comparisons to professional golfer Will Zalatoris.

His academic work primarily involves functional neuroimaging research into working memory in schizophrenia, and the development and use of techniques for meta-analysis. He currently directs the Cognitive Neuroscience & Psychosis Lab at the at the Renaissance School of Medicine at Stony Brook University.

== Filmography ==
=== Film ===
Year	Title	Role	Notes
1996	Happy Gilmore	Happy's Waterbury Caddy/Blondie	Retroactively revealed to be Will Zalatoris
2001	Saving Silverman	Belston	
2001	Rat Race	Skinhead Tour Guide	
2002	Cheats	Shapiro	
2002	The Wisher	Shane Underwood	
2003	A Guy Thing	Guy on Moped	
2003	Agent Cody Banks	Earl's Intern	
2003	Air Bud: Spikes Back	Fair Game Boy	Uncredited

=== Television ===
Year	Title	Role	Notes
1995	The Marshal	Ronnie	Episode: "Pass the Gemelli"
1996	Robin of Locksley	Jimmy Brandenberg	Television film
1996	The Angel of Pennsylvania Avenue	Lee Hudson	Television film
1998	Breaker High	Ronald	Episode: "To Kill a MockingNerd"
1998	Catch Me If You Can	Laser Attendant #1	Television film
1999	Night Man	Teen #2	Episode: "Double Double"
1999	Hayley Wagner, Star	Joel	Television film
1999	Nothing Too Good for a Cowboy	The Kid	Episode: "Deja Vu All Over Again"
2002	My Guide to Becoming a Rock Star		Episode: "Pilot"
2002	Jeremiah	Damien	Episode: "Tripwire"
