= The New Tenants =

- Poster
- Directed by: Joachim Back
- Written by: David Rakoff
- Based on: De nye lejere by Anders Thomas Jensen
- Produced by: Sam Bisbee; Johanne Stryhn Hoerby; Erika Hampson; Tivi Magnusson; Christian Potalivo
- Starring: Kevin Corrigan; David Rakoff; Vincent D'Onofrio
- Cinematography: Paweł Edelman
- Edited by: Russell Icke
- Music by: Laurent Parisi
- Production companies: M&M Productions; Park Pictures
- Distributed by: Shorts International
- Release date: December 30, 2009 (Los Angeles Reel Film Festival)
- Running time: 21 minutes
- Countries: Denmark; United States
- Language: English

The New Tenants is a 2009 Danish-American short film directed by Joachim Back. The film won the Oscar for Best Live Action Short at the 82nd Academy Awards.

The film follows a couple who, upon moving into a new apartment, are terrorized by a drug dealer, looking to settle a score with the previous owner. The screenplay was adapted by David Rakoff from the 1996 short film De nye lejere by Anders Thomas Jensen. It was produced at M&M Productions and Park Pictures by executive producers Lance Acord, Mette Ambro, Jackie Kelman Bisbee, Gigi Realini, Jean Villiers, producers Sam Bisbee, Johanne Stryhn Felding, Erika Hampson, Tivi Magnusson, Christian Potalivo, director of photography Pawel Edelman, production designer Janet Kim. The locations manager was Nathan West.

== Cast ==
- Liane Balaban as Irene
- Kevin Corrigan as Zelko
- Vincent D'Onofrio as Jan
- Helen Hanft as Grandma
- Jamie Harrold as Pete
- David Rakoff as Frank
