= R. L. Ryan =

American actor (1946–1991)

- Born: Robert Lawrence Ryan; October 29, 1946; Philadelphia, Pennsylvania
- Died: March 22, 1991 (aged 44); Philadelphia, Pennsylvania

Robert Lawrence "R. L." Ryan (October 29, 1946 – March 22, 1991) was an American actor.

== Early life ==
Ryan was born in Pennsylvania, where he lived throughout his life.

== Career ==
The heavyset character actor was best known for his supporting roles in a handful of B-movies from the 1980s including cult classics The Toxic Avenger, Eat and Run, and Street Trash. Ryan was sometimes credited as Pat Ryan Jr., Bob Ryan, Robert L. Ryan, or Pat Ryan.

== Death ==
In 1991, he died of a heart attack at age 44.

== Documentary ==
In January 2026, production began on a new documentary about the life and career of R.L. Ryan. He Came From Ridley Park: The R.L. Ryan Story is an upcoming documentary produced by Leroy Street Films and Movie Dumpster LLC. The film is being directed by John Campopiano, Executive Produced by James Cilano of Witter Entertainment, Joseph La Scola of Movie Dumpster, and John Campopiano of Leroy Street Films, and is being written by Matthew Spry and John Campopiano.

== Filmography ==
- Fighting Back (1982) - Neighbor
- The Toxic Avenger (1984) - Mayor Belgoody
- Birdy (1984) - Joe Sagessa
- Class of Nuke 'Em High (1986) - Mr. Finley
- Street Trash (1987) - Frank Schnizer
- Mannequin (1987) - Pizzeria Manager
- Eat and Run (1987) - Murray Creature
- Forever, Lulu (1987) - Fat Man (final film role)
