= Spliced (film) =

- A poster bearing the film's alternate title: The Wisher
- Directed by: Gavin Wilding
- Written by: Ellen Cook
- Produced by: Mark Reid
- Starring: Ron Silver; Liane Balaban
- Cinematography: Mark Dobrescu
- Edited by: Dean Evans
- Music by: Chris Ainscough
- Production company: American World Pictures (AWP)
- Distributed by: Screen Media Films
- Release date: 1 December 2002
- Running time: 83 minutes
- Country: Canada
- Language: English

Spliced (also known as The Wisher) is a 2002 Canadian supernatural slasher film directed by Gavin Wilding and starring Ron Silver, Liane Balaban and Drew Lachey. The film was released on December 1, 2002, in Canada. In 2003, Wilding was nominated for a Leo Award for the film.

== Plot ==
A teenage girl, Mary, who loves horror movies watches them all the time and experiences nightmares. She begins to sleepwalk out of her house, resulting in her parents getting angry. They forbid her to watch any more horror movies in an attempt to prevent her sleepwalking, however there's a new movie called "The Wisher" out which is a huge hit. Her father tells her she's not allowed to see it, but she sneaks out anyway. Before she leaves, she says "I wish he would just go away" and goes and sees the movie. Surprisingly, a scene in the movie is too much for her and she leaves. Her dad goes after her but then dies unexpectedly in a car accident. She then notices one of the characters in the movie following her around and whenever she makes a wish for something bad the wisher grants it.

== Cast ==
- Ron Silver as Campbell
- Liane Balaban as Mary
- Drew Lachey as Brad
- Wendy Anderson as Kathy Ryan
- Iain MacLean as Jake Ryan
- Ariel Bastiam as Beth Ryan
- Jared Van Snellenberg as Shane Underwood
- Andrea Runge as Kara Genaro
- Robert Bamford as The Wisher

== Production ==
It was filmed in Regina and Moose Jaw.
