= Scott Reiniger =

American actor

- Born: Scott Hale Reiniger, Jr. September 5, 1948 (age 77); White Plains, New York, U.S.
- Education: Rollins College
- Occupation: Actor
- Years active: 1968–present
- Spouse: (m.) Barbara Worthington (div. 2014)
- Relatives: Josiah Harlan (great-great-great-grandfather); Richard Harlan (great-great-great-great-uncle)

Scott Hale Reiniger, Harlan Sahib Bahadur, Prince of Ghor (born September 5, 1948) is an American actor. He is a professor at the American Academy of Dramatic Arts (AADA) in Los Angeles, California. He is best known as one of the stars of the 1978 classic horror film Dawn of the Dead.

== Biography ==
Scott Hale Reiniger, Jr. was born on September 5, 1948, in White Plains, New York. He is a graduate of Rollins College in Theater Arts.

Following his appearance as Roger in George A. Romero's original Dawn of the Dead in 1978, Reiniger played Marhalt in Romero's 1981 film Knightriders. He also made a cameo appearance in the 2004 remake of Dawn of the Dead directed by Zack Snyder.

He currently teaches at the American Academy of Dramatic Arts in Hollywood. Reiniger continues to attend horror conventions around the world.

=== Afghan lineage ===
In 2004 it was revealed that Reiniger is the "Prince of Ghor," a province in western Afghanistan. Reiniger's great-great-great grandfather, Josiah Harlan, was the first American to set foot in Afghanistan. Harlan was granted sovereignty, in perpetuity, for himself and his descendants by Refee Beg in exchange for military support. The Hazaras had been raided by Uzbek warlords, particularly Murad Beg, and were nominal vassals of the Emperor of Afghanistan.

The Emir Dost Mohammad Khan sent Josiah Harlan with an armed group to collect tribute from the Hazaras. The Hazara leaders, of whom the most prominent was Refee Beg, offered to send tribute if Harlan would unite them in the struggle against the raiding Uzbek warlords. The agreement reached included Harlan being made hereditary paramount ruler and advocate. The British arriving later negotiated with the Emperor for the departure and loss of temporal power of Harlan.

In his later life, Josiah Harlan continued advocating for the Hazaras. Reiniger has expressed mild interest in the title and suggests passing it to his younger brother, Harlan Reiniger, a historian and PBS documentary producer. However, he considers the title an anecdote and curiosity of no real-world importance.

== Filmography ==
Year	Title	Role	Notes
1977	Danny	Eddie	
1978	Dawn of the Dead	Roger "Trooper" DeMarco	
1981	Knightriders	Sir Marhalt	
1981	The Other Victim	Rapist	
2004	Dawn of the Dead	The General	

=== Television ===
Year	Title	Role	Notes
1984	Falcon Crest	Truck Driver	1 episode
