= Ron Silver =

American actor (1946–2009)

- Ron Silver in the television series Skin (2003)
- Born: Ronald Arthur Silver; July 2, 1946; New York City, U.S.
- Died: March 15, 2009 (aged 62); New York City, U.S.
- Resting place: Westchester Hills Cemetery
- Education: University at Buffalo (BA); St. John's University
- Occupation: Actor
- Years active: 1974–2009
- Political party: Independent (after 2001)
- Other political affiliations: Democratic (before 2001)
- Spouse: Lynne Miller (m. 1975; div. 1997)
- Children: 2

12th President of the Actors' Equity Association
- In office 1991–2000
- Preceded by: Colleen Dewhurst
- Succeeded by: Patrick Quinn

Ronald Arthur Silver (July 2, 1946 – March 15, 2009) was an American actor. He portrayed Henry Kissinger, Alan Dershowitz and Angelo Dundee. He was awarded the 1988 Tony Award for Best Actor in a Play for Speed-the-Plow, a satirical dissection of the American movie business, and was nominated for a Primetime Emmy Award for his recurring role as political strategist Bruno Gianelli in The West Wing.

== Early life and education ==
Silver was born on July 2, 1946, in Manhattan, the son of May (née Zimelman), a substitute teacher, and Irving Roy Silver, a clothing sales executive. Silver was raised Jewish on the Lower East Side of Manhattan and attended Stuyvesant High School.

Silver went on to graduate from the State University of New York at Buffalo, with a Bachelor of Arts in Spanish and Chinese, and earned a master's degree in Chinese History from St. John's University in New York and the Chinese Culture University in Taiwan. He also attended Columbia University's Graduate School of International and Public Affairs (SIPA), and studied acting at the Herbert Berghof Studio, and later at The Actors Studio. As a student he was exempt from the Vietnam War draft.

== Career ==
Silver got his big acting break starring in El Grande de Coca-Cola in 1974. Producers Richard Flanzer and Roy Silver (no relation) opened it at the famed Whisky a Go Go on the Sunset Strip in Los Angeles. The production ran for more than a year. Silver and his co-star, actor Jeff Goldblum, were discovered by Hollywood film agents during this show's run.

In 1976, he made his film debut in Tunnel Vision, and also played a placekicker in the football comedy film Semi-Tough. From 1976 to 1978, he had a recurring role as Gary Levy in the sitcom Rhoda, a spinoff from The Mary Tyler Moore Show. Additional screen roles include psychiatrists in the Chuck Norris film Silent Rage and in the horror story The Entity (1983), the devoted son of Anne Bancroft in Garbo Talks (1984), an incompetent detective in Eat and Run (1986), the pistol-wielding psychopath stalking Jamie Lee Curtis in 1989's Blue Steel, and the lead in Paul Mazursky's Oscar-nominated Enemies, A Love Story (1989).

He starred as Jerry Lewis's character's son in the multi-episode "Garment District Arc" of the television crime series Wiseguy (1988).

He portrayed two well-known attorneys in films based on actual events, playing defense attorney Alan Dershowitz in the drama Reversal of Fortune (1990), based on the trial of Claus von Bülow and defense attorney Robert Shapiro in the television film American Tragedy (2000), the story of the O. J. Simpson trial.

From 1991 to 2000, Silver served as president of the Actors' Equity Association. He played a film producer in Best Friends opposite Burt Reynolds and Goldie Hawn (1982), an actor in Lovesick (1983) and a film director in Mr. Saturday Night (1992). Silver portrayed a corrupt, rogue senator in the 1994 Jean-Claude Van Damme sci-fi thriller Timecop.

On television in 1998, he starred opposite Kirstie Alley in season two of her TV comedy series Veronica's Closet.

In other films based on true stories, Silver portrayed tennis player Bobby Riggs in the TV docudrama When Billie Beat Bobby (2001), about Riggs' real-life exhibition tennis match against Billie Jean King, which Riggs lost. He was also featured as Muhammad Ali's boxing trainer and cornerman Angelo Dundee in Michael Mann's 2001 biopic Ali.

In 2000 he starred as rock promoter Bill Graham in “Bill Graham Presents” a one-man show written by playwright Robert Greenfield, who co-wrote Graham's posthumously published 1992 autobiography.

From 2001 to 2002 and again from 2005 to 2006, he had a recurring role as presidential campaign adviser Bruno Gianelli on the NBC series The West Wing.

Silver provided the narration for the 2004 political documentary film FahrenHYPE 9/11 that was produced as a conservative political response to the award-winning and controversial Michael Moore documentary film, Fahrenheit 9/11.

Silver also narrated a MEMRI documentary film about the Arab and Iranian reactions to the September 11 attacks called The Arab and Iranian Reaction to 911: Five Years Later.

Additionally, Silver narrated the audiobook versions of several Philip Roth novels, including American Pastoral, The Plot Against America, and Portnoy's Complaint.

One of his final film performances was as a judge in another true story, 2006's Find Me Guilty, directed by Sidney Lumet and starring Vin Diesel.

In February 2008, Silver began hosting The Ron Silver Show on Sirius Satellite Radio, which focused on politics and public affairs.

== Personal life ==
Silver traveled to more than 30 countries and spoke fluent Mandarin Chinese and Spanish. He taught at the high school level and was a social worker for the Department of Social Services.

In 1975 he married Lynne Miller, a social worker who later became a Self magazine editor. The couple had two children; they divorced in 1997.

In 1989, he co-founded the Creative Coalition, an entertainment industry political advocacy organization that champions First Amendment rights, public education, and support for the arts.

=== Political beliefs ===
Silver was a member of the Council on Foreign Relations. In 2000, he co-founded the organization One Jerusalem to oppose the Oslo Peace Agreement and to maintain "a united Jerusalem as the undivided capital of Israel".

Silver, who had been a lifelong Democrat, left the party and became an independent and a supporter of President George W. Bush after the September 11 attacks, citing those attacks and Democratic policies regarding terrorism as reasons. He spoke at the 2004 Republican National Convention, continued to support Bush, and was appointed chairman for the Millennium Committee by New York Mayor Rudy Giuliani.

In a blog post on the PJ Media website, Silver recounted that colleagues on the set of The West Wing had teasingly referred to him as "Ron, Ron, the Neo-Con".

On October 7, 2005, Bush nominated Silver to the Board of Directors of the United States Institute of Peace. On September 8, 2006, it was announced that Silver had joined an advisory committee to the Lewis Libby Legal Defense Trust.

Bush also appointed Silver to the Honorary Delegation that accompanied him to Jerusalem in May 2008 for the celebration of the 60th anniversary of the State of Israel.

In one of his last televised interviews, Silver told Sky News that Senator John McCain's choice of Sarah Palin as his running mate in the 2008 Presidential election was a "brilliant political choice" but that a part of him wished to "see an African American become president in my lifetime". In his obituary in The New York Times, his brother, Mitchell Silver, was quoted as saying, "He told me that he did vote for Barack Obama in the end".

== Death ==
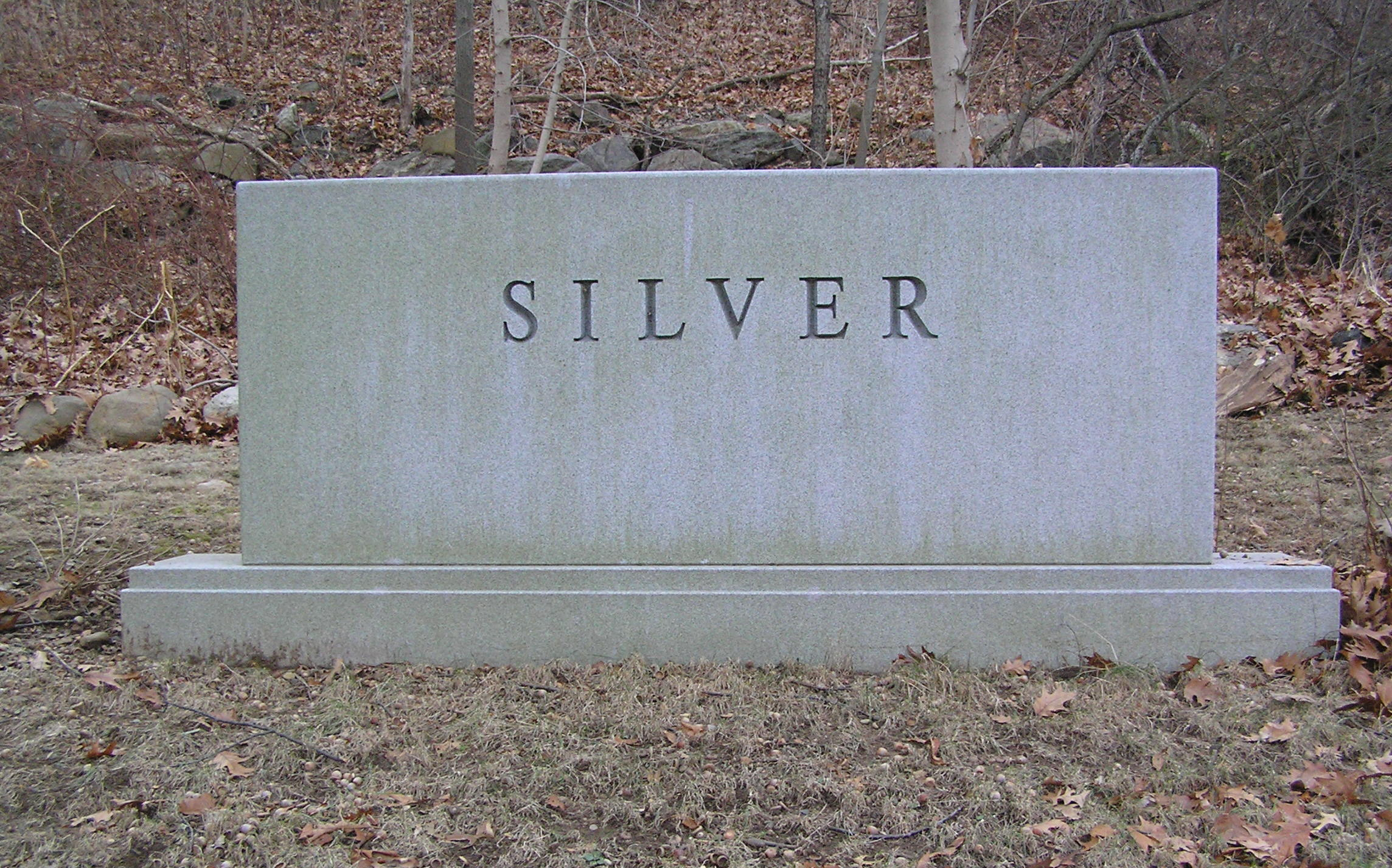
Silver family marker

Silver, a long-time smoker, died on March 15, 2009, at the age of 62, of esophageal cancer, which had been diagnosed two years earlier. He is buried at Westchester Hills Cemetery in Hastings-on-Hudson, New York.

== Filmography ==
=== Film ===
Year	Title	Role	Notes
1976	Tunnel Vision	Dr. Manuel Labor	film debut
1976	Welcome to L.A.	Masseur	Uncredited
1977	Semi-Tough	Vlada Kostov	
1982	Silent Rage	Dr. Tom Halman	
1982	The Entity	Phil Sneiderman	
1982	Best Friends	Larry Weisman	
1983	Lovesick	Ted Caruso	
1983	Silkwood	Paul Stone	
1984	Romancing the Stone	Vendor	
1984	The Goodbye People	Eddie Bergson	
1984	Garbo Talks	Gilbert Rolfe	
1984	Oh, God! You Devil	Gary Frantz	
1987	Eat and Run	Mickey McSorely	
1989	Enemies, A Love Story	Herman Broder	
1990	Blue Steel	Eugene Hunt	
1990	Reversal of Fortune	Alan Dershowitz	
1991	Married to It	Leo Rothenberg	
1991	The Good Policeman	Isaac Seidel	
1992	Live Wire	Frank Traveres	
1992	Mr. Saturday Night	Larry Meyerson	
1994	Timecop	Sen. Aaron McComb	
1995	Deadly Outbreak	Colonel Baron	Direct-to-Video
1996	The Arrival	Phil Gordian / Mexican Guard	
1996	Girl 6	Director #2 - LA	
1996	Danger Zone	Maurice Dupont	
1998	The White Raven	Tully Windsor	
1999	Black and White	Simon Herzel	
2001	Festival in Cannes	Rick Yorkin	
2001	Ali	Angelo Dundee	
2001	Exposure	Gary Whitford	Direct-to-Video
2002	The Wisher	Campbell	
2005	Red Mercury	Sidney	
2006	Find Me Guilty	Judge Sidney Finestein	
2006	Call It Fiction	Chas	Short
2007	The Ten	Fielding Barnes	
2009	A Secret Promise	Sam Dunbar	(final film role)

=== Television ===
Year	Title	Role	Notes
1974	The Mac Davis Show	unknown	unknown episode
1975	Big Eddie	Enzo	Episode: "Hellow Poppa"
1975	McMillan & Wife	Art	Episode: "Secrets for Sale"
1975	Rhoda	Sonny Michaels	Episode: "Mucho, Macho"
1976	The Rockford Files	Ted Haller	Episode: "The Italian Bird Fiasco"
1976	The Return of the World's Greatest Detective	Dr. Collins	Television Movie
1976–1978	Rhoda	Gary Levy	series regular; 33 episodes
1978	Having Babies	Lamar	Episode: "Careers"
1978	Murder at the Mardi Gras	Larry Cook	Television Movie
1978	Betrayal	Bob Cohen	Television Movie
1979	Dear Detective	Detective Schwartz	4 episodes
1980	Here's Boomer	Kolodny	Episode: "Private Eye"
1980	The Stockard Channing Show	Brad Gabriel	series regular; 13 episodes
1981	World of Honor	David Lerner	Television Series
1982	Baker's Dozen	Mike Locasale	6 episodes; recurring role
1983	Hill Street Blues	Sam Weiser	2 episodes
1984	American Playhouse	Gruenwald	Episode: "The Cafeteria"
1985	Kane & Abel	Thaddeus Cohen	Television Miniseries; 2 episodes
1986	Trapped in Silence	Dr. Jeff Tomlinson	Television Movie
1987	Trying Times	Driving Instructor	Episode: "Drive, She Said"
1987	Billionaire Boys Club	Ron Levin	Television Movie; Nominated - Primetime Emmy Award for Outstanding Supporting Actor in a Miniseries or Special
1988	A Father's Revenge	Max Greewald	Television Movie
1988–1989	Wiseguy	David Sternberg	5 episodes; recurring role
1990	Screen Two	Asa Kaufman	Episode: "Fellow Traveller"
1990	Forgotten Prisoners: The Amnesty Files	Jordan Ford	Television Movie
1993	Blind Side	Doug Kaines	Television Movie
1993	Lifepod	Terman	Television Movie; also Director
1995	A Woman of Independent Means	Arthur	Television Miniseries; 3 episodes
1995	Almost Golden: The Jessica Savitch Story	Ron Kershaw	Television Movie
1995	Kissinger and Nixon	Henry A. Kissinger/Narrator	Television Movie; Nominated - Gemini Award for Best Performance by a Lead Actor in a Dramatic Program
1996	Shadow Zone: The Undead Express	Valentine	Television Movie
1996–1997	Chicago Hope	Tommy Wilmette	11 episodes; recurring role
1997	The Beneficiary	Guy Girard	Television Movie
1997	Skeletons	Peter Crane	Television Movie
1998	Rhapsody in Bloom	Mitch Bloom	Television Movie
1998–1999	Veronica's Closet	Alec Bilson	series regular; 23 episodes (season 2)
1999	Love Is Strange	Tom Ainsworth	Television Movie
1999	In the Company of Spies	Tom Lenahan	Television Movie
1999	Heat Vision and Jack	Ron Silver	Television Short
2000	Ratz	Herb Soric	Television Movie
2000	Cutaway	Lieutenant Brian Margate	Television Movie
2000	American Tragedy	Robert Shapiro	Television Movie
2001	When Billie Beat Bobby	Bobby Riggs	Television Movie
2001	The Practice	Attorney John Mockler	Episode: "Killing Time"
2001–2006	The West Wing	Bruno Gianelli	19 episodes; recurring role Nominated - Primetime Emmy Award for Outstanding Guest Actor in a Drama Series
2002	Master Spy: The Robert Hanssen Story	Mike Fine	Television Movie
2003–2004	Skin	Larry Goldman	6 episodes; recurring role
2004	Jack	Paul	Television Movie; Nominated - Daytime Emmy Award for Outstanding Performer in a Children/Youth/Family Special
2004–2007	Law & Order	Bernie Adler	2 episodes
2006	Law & Order: Trial by Jury	Bernie Alder	Episode: "Eros in the Upper Eighties"
2007	Crossing Jordan	Shelly Levine	Episode: "Night of the Living Dead"
2008	Xenophobia	President	Television Movie
